= Nissan GT-R in motorsport =

Japanese car adapted for racing

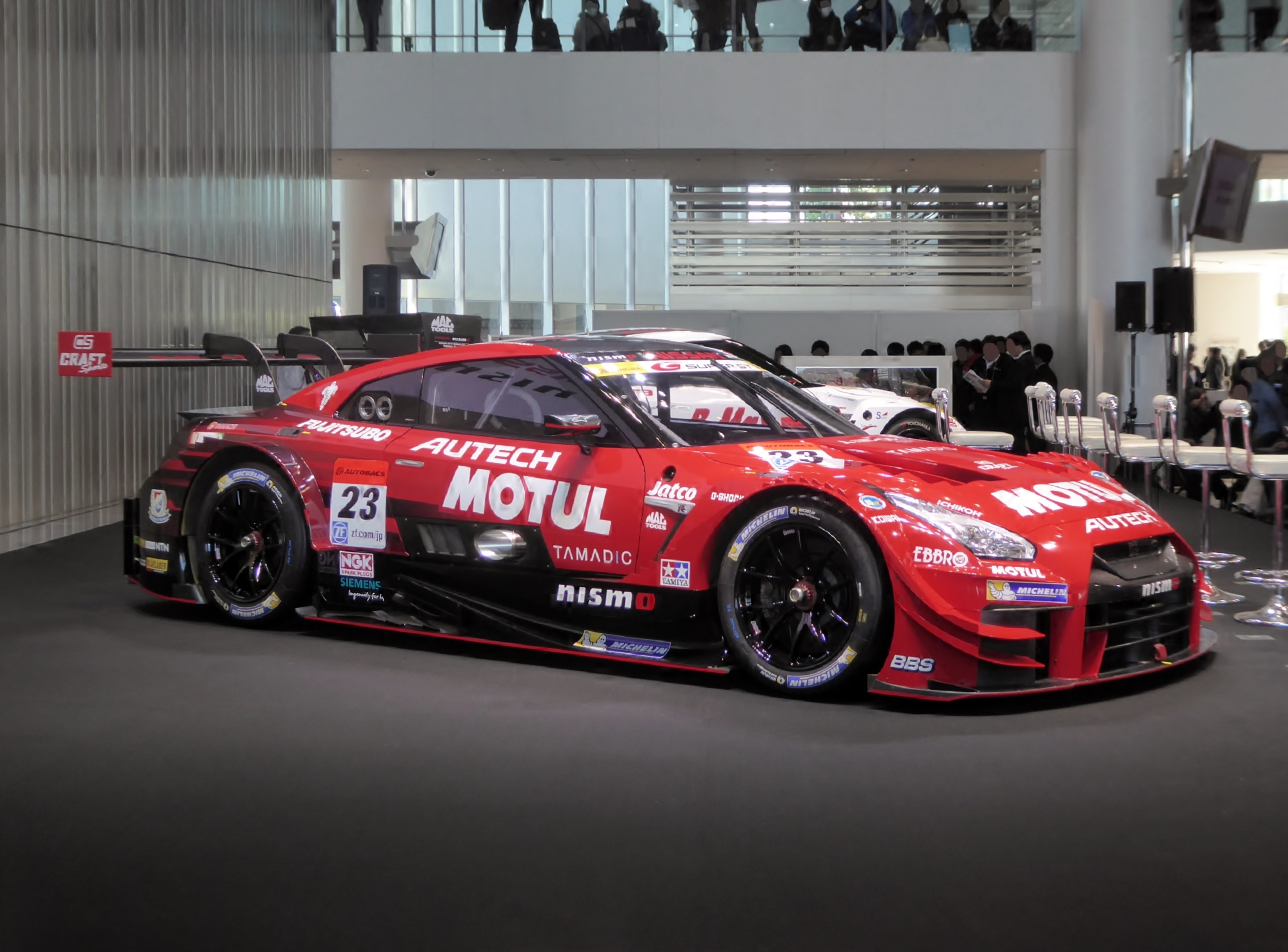

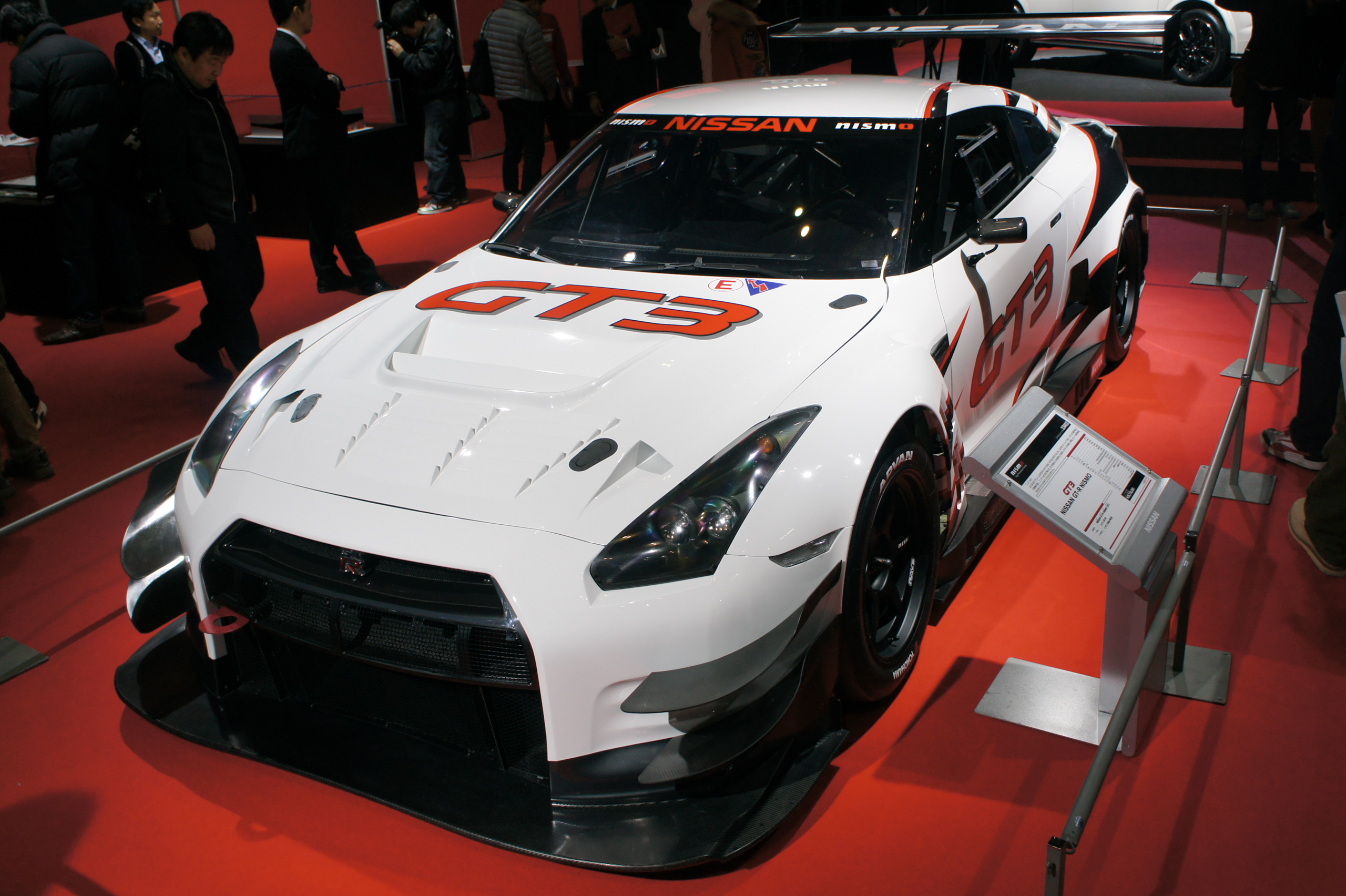
GT-R Nismo GT500 (top) and GT-R Nismo GT3 (bottom), two of the Nissan's most successful race cars

The Nissan GT-R has established notable success in global motorsport, continuing its predecessor's motorsport pedigree, with success across various racing disciplines—most notably in Super GT, FIA GT1 World Championship, and across various Group GT3 competitions. It has achieved multiple championship victories, across various formats, with support from both manufacturer and customer teams worldwide.

In Super GT, the GT-R made an immediate impact upon its 2008 debut in the GT500 class, winning seven of nine races and securing the drivers' championship in its debut season. Momentum continued with back-to-back titles in 2011 and 2012, followed by further championship triumphs in 2014 and 2015. Having retired from the series in 2021, the GT-R holds the record for most titles and race wins in Super GT/JGTC history. In the GT300 class, the GT-R Nismo GT3 has proved to be equally successful, earning a record four championship doubles (drivers’ and teams’ titles) in 2015, 2020, 2022, and 2026 seasons. It continues to compete actively through customer teams.

Internationally, the GT-R achieved notable success in the FIA GT1 World Championship, debuting in 2009 and gaining further success in the following seasons. The car claimed the 2010 RAC Tourist Trophy and secured the 2011 drivers’ championship with JR Motorsports before the series folded in 2012. Success continued with the GT-R Nismo GT3 in Group GT3 racing, notably capturing GT World Challenge Europe Endurance Cup titles in 2013 and 2015, before concluding its international campaign in 2017. Domestically, in Japan’s Super Taikyu Series, the car holds a record six championships. It remains actively campaigned in the GT World Challenge Asia and the SRO Japan Cup through customer racing teams.

Beyond these series, the GT-R has competed across a wide range of motorsport arenas. It has achieved class wins at events such as Targa Tasmania and Targa West, and also won the One Lap of America in 2009, finishing second in 2010. The car has appeared in regional GT championships and global endurance events, notably winning the 2015 Bathurst 12 Hour, 2011 and 2012 24 Hours of Nürburgring races in the SP8T class. The GT-R has a renowned aftermarket tuning community. Its superior tunability has led to record-setting performances across various disciplines, including notable successes in drag racing and international drifting events.

== Super GT ==
=== GT500 ===
Nissan GT-R Nismo GT500
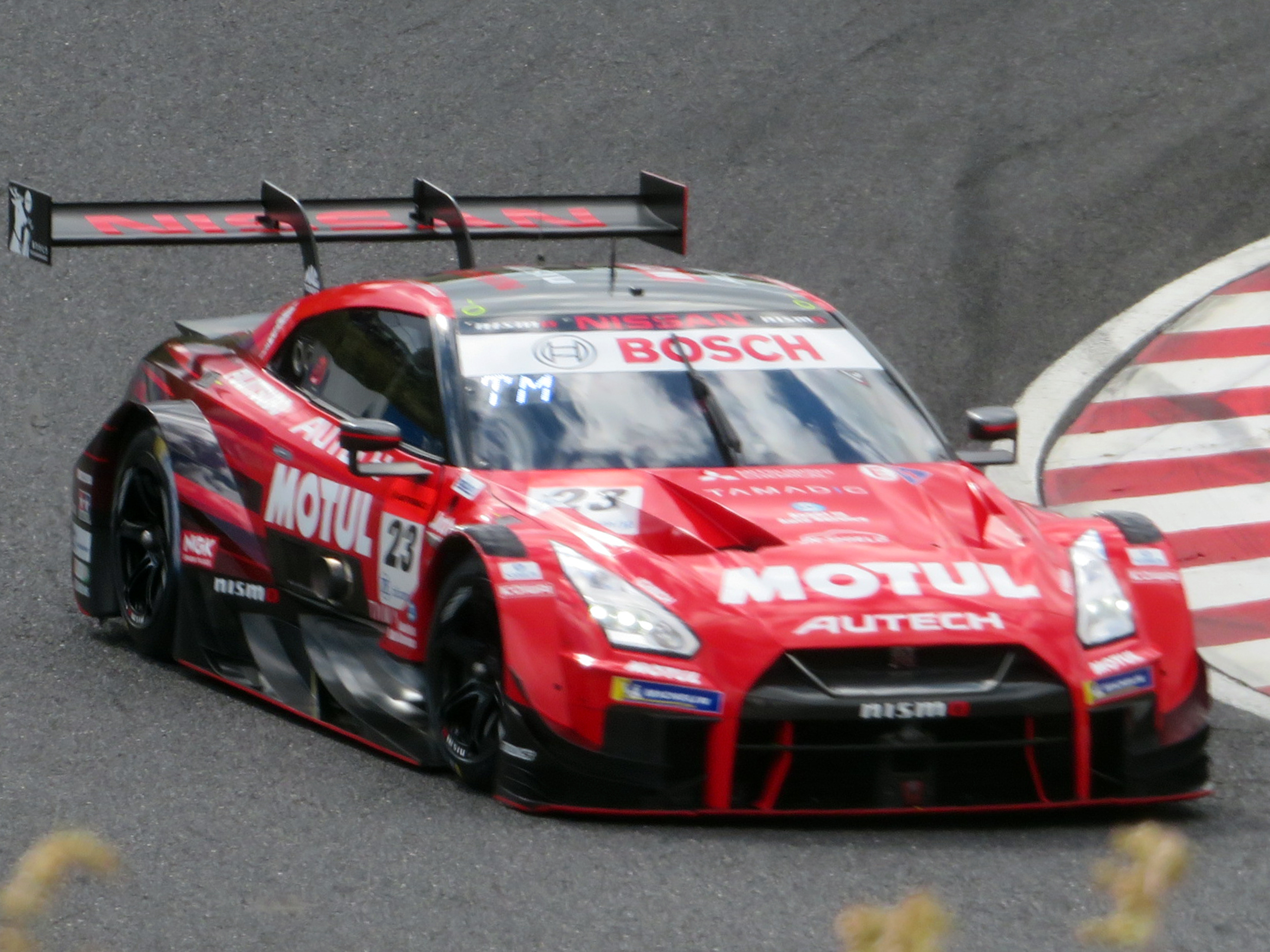
- GT-R Nismo GT500
- Category: Super GT
- Constructor: Nissan
- Predecessor: Nissan 350Z GT
- Successor: Nissan Z GT500

Technical specifications
- Chassis: Carbon-fibre and aluminium honeycomb monocoque
- Suspension (front): Double wishbone, adjustable suspension
- Suspension (rear): Same as front
- Length: 4,775 mm (188 in)
- Width: 1,950 mm (77 in)
- Height: 1,150 mm (45 in)
- Wheelbase: 2,750 mm (108 in)
- Engine: VK45DE 4.5L (4,494 cc (274 cu in)) (2008–2009), VRH34A 3.4L (3,396 cc (207 cu in) (2010–2011), VRH34B 3.4L (3,396 cc (207 cu in) (2012–2013), naturally aspirated V8 engines, NR20A (1,998 cc (122 cu in) single-turbocharged inline 4 engine (2014–2019), NR20B (1,998 cc (122 cu in) single-turbocharged inline 4 engine (2020), NR4S21 (1,998 cc (122 cu in) single-turbocharged inline 4 engine (2021), front-mid longitudinally mounted, rear-wheel-drive
- Transmission: Hewland 6-speed transaxle sequential transmission with paddle shifters
- Power: 368 kW (493 hp; 500 PS) (2008–2011); 390 kW (523 hp; 530 PS) (2012–2013); 478 kW (641 hp; 650 PS) (2014–2021)
- Weight: 1,020 kg (2,249 lb)
- Fuel: Various
- Lubricants: Motul
- Brakes: Brembo ventilated carbon discs, 6 piston (front) and 4 piston (rear) calipers
- Tyres: Various, 18×12-inch (front) & 18×13-inch (rear) Rays forged wheels
- Clutch: 5.5-inch carbon 4 plate

Competition history
- Notable entrants: (Japan) Hasemi Motorsport (Japan) Team Impul (Japan) Nismo (Japan) Kondo Racing (Japan) Mola (Japan) NDDP Racing
- Notable drivers: (Italy) Ronnie Quintarelli (Japan) Tsugio Matsuda (France) Sébastien Philippe (Japan) Masataka Yanagida (Spain) Lucas Ordóñez (Germany) Michael Krumm (Japan) Satoshi Motoyama (France) Benoît Tréluyer (Brazil) João Paulo de Oliveira (Japan) Daiki Sasaki (Japan) Katsumasa Chiyo (United Kingdom) Jann Mardenborough (Japan) Kohei Hirate (Japan) Kazuki Hiramine
- Debut: 2008 Suzuka GT 300 km round
- First win: 2008 Suzuka GT 300 km round
- Last win: 2021 Sugo GT 300 km round
- Last event: 2021 Fujimaki Group Fuji GT 300km round
Races	Wins	Podiums	Poles
113	41	89	36
- Teams' Championships: 4 (2011, 2012, 2014 & 2015)
- Drivers' Championships: 5 (Satoshi Motoyama & Benoît Tréluyer in 2008, Ronnie Quintarelli & Masataka Yanagida in 2011 & 2012, Ronnie Quintarelli & Tsugio Matsuda in 2014 & 2015)

Nismo, the motorsport division of Nissan, participated with the GT-R Nismo GT500 in the Super GT series for the first time in 2008, replacing the 350Z GT. The GT500 version of the car featured a completely different drivetrain compared to the production car. It featured the VK45DE 4.5-litre naturally aspirated V8 engine, replacing the VR38DETT engine. It used a 6-speed sequential manual gearbox and a rear-wheel-drive layout derived from its predecessor. A prototype was spotted testing around the Suzuka Circuit, as well as at the Fuji Speedway in Japan. It went onto win the opening round of its debut season, at Suzuka scoring a 1–2 finish for Nissan. In the following race, repeated its 1–2 result, won the drivers' championship in its debut season, through team Xanavi, and drivers Satoshi Motoyama and Benoît Tréluyer, although they only managed to finish third in the teams' championship. The car's dominant debut season saw it winning 7 out of 9 races and 10 podium finishes with four different teams.

Due to engine reliability issues, the car only managed to achieve 4 victories and 8 podium finishes in 2009, reigning champions won 2 races and 3 podium finishes to end up 3rd in the championship standings. In 2010, the VK45DE engine was replaced by the exclusively developed VRH34A 3.4-litre engine. The season was not that successful, as the car only managed to win 2 races and 4 podium finishes. Team Impul finished 5th in standings. In 2011 and 2012, Team Mola with drivers Ronnie Quintarelli and Masataka Yanagida won back-to-back championships in both teams' and drivers' classifications. During the two dominant seasons, the car won 8 out of 16 races and achieved 19 podium finishes with three different teams. In addition, it also won the JAF Grand Prix in 2011, Quintarelli won the first race, starting from pole position, while Yanagida finished 2nd to score a podium finish with the fastest lap in the second race. Quintarelli again won the first race in the 2012 round, starting from 10th on the grid. Team Impul GT-R Nismo GT500 set the fastest lap. In the 2013 Super GT season, it only managed to score a race win and 4 podium finishes, Team Nismo finished 6th in standings. In the last ever JAF Grand Prix, team Impul scored a podium finish in the second race, finishing the race in 3rd position, starting from 7th on the grid.

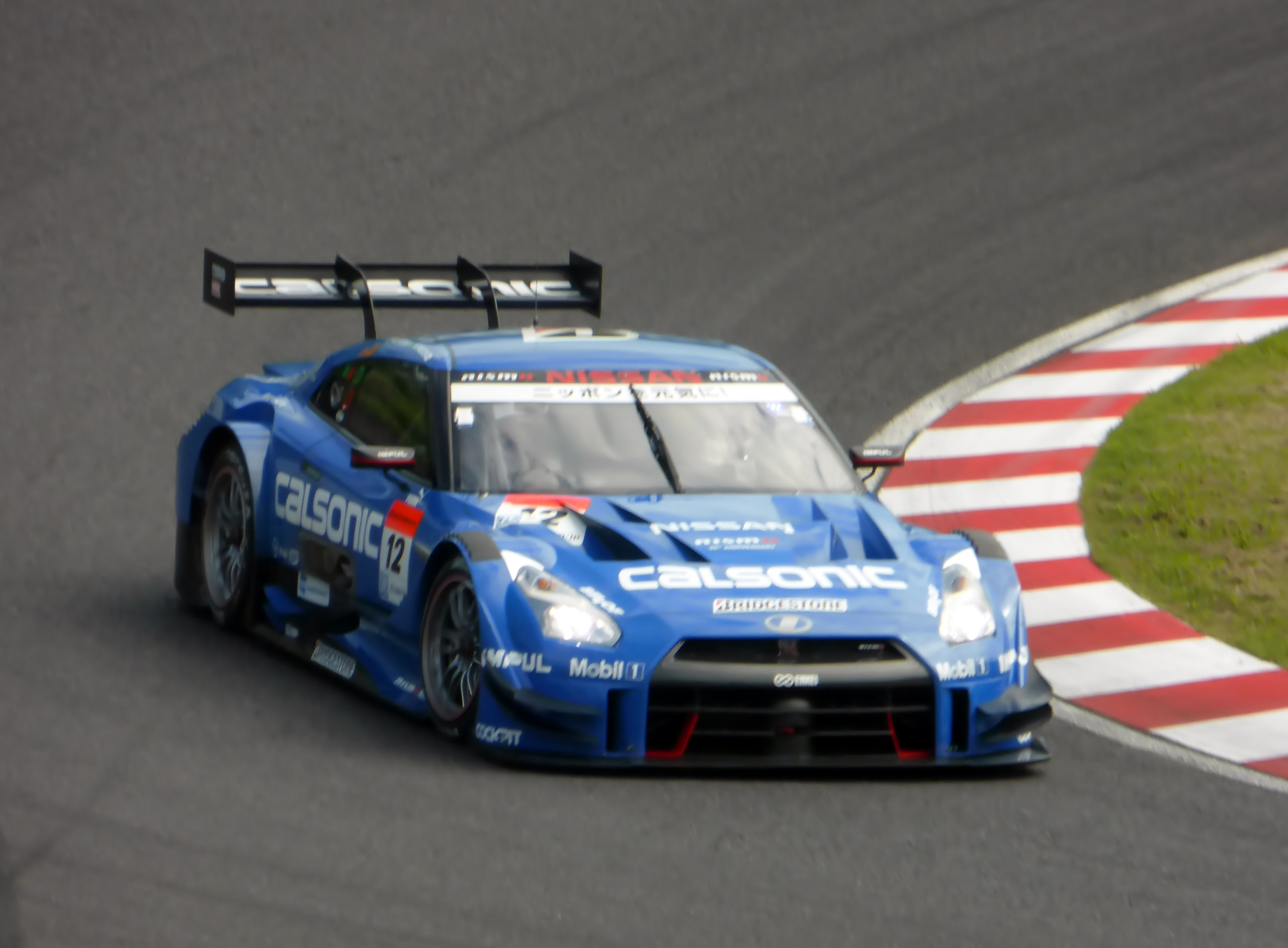
GT-R Nismo GT500 in 2014

In 2014, Super GT regulations were aligned with those of the Deutsche Tourenwagen Masters, and so the V8 engine was replaced by the NR20A 2.0-litre, 4-cylinder turbocharged engine. The car took the most out of the regulation overhaul, it repeatedly won both 2014 and 2015 championships with Team Nismo drivers, Quintarelli and Tsugio Matsuda. It won 7 races and 21 podium finishes during both seasons. In 2016, reigning champions ended up 3rd in standings, the car scored 5 race wins, 2 pole positions and 7 podium finishes with four different teams during the season. Although the team scored a race win, a pole position and 3 podium finishes, both Nismo drivers missed out in the championship by 2 points in 2017. Combined with other teams' results, the car ended the season with a race win, 2 pole positions, and 4 podium finishes.

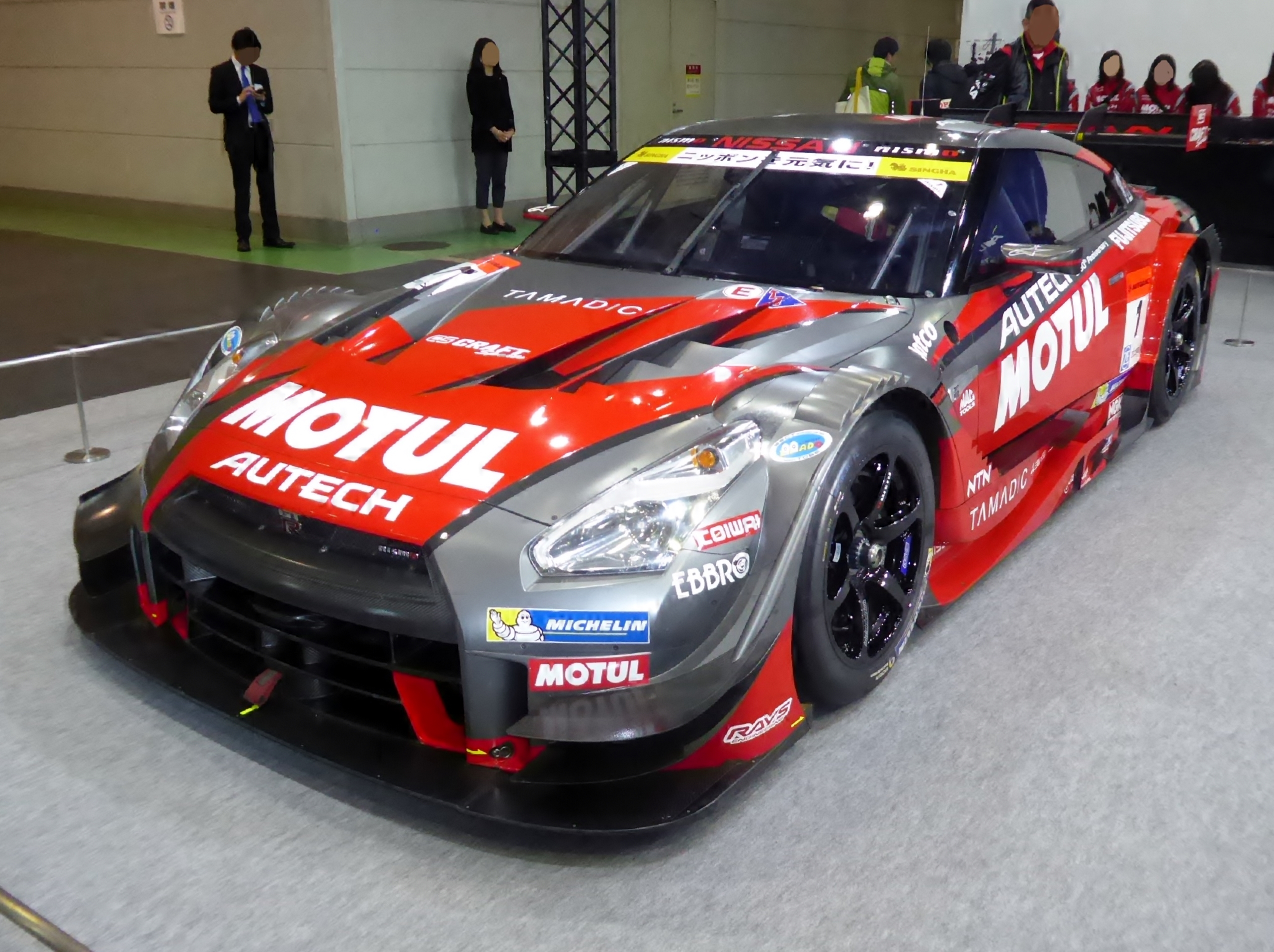
GT-R Nismo GT500 in 2018

Regulation changes in 2018 saw the beginning of an unsuccessful era for the GT-R Nismo GT500, as it only managed to achieve a race win, a pole position, and 2 podium finishes. End of the season, Team Nismo were a disappointing 8th in championship standings. The 2019 season saw improvements, attaining a race win, 3 pole positions, 2 fastest laps and 6 podium finishes during the season. Team Nismo finished 3rd in standings, 32.5 points behind the championship winners. In 2020, Team Nismo fell back to 5th in standings, as the car only scored 2 race wins, a fastest lap, and 3 podium finishes. Scoring 2 race wins and 6 podium finishes during the 2021 season, it was announced that the GT-R Nismo GT500 will be retired by the end of the season. Including its record 5 drivers' and 4 teams' championships, the GT-R Nismo GT500 has the most race wins for a GT500 car, a record 41 race wins (including 2 Suzuka 10 Hours wins) and 89 podium finishes from 113 race starts, making it one of the most successful GT500 race cars of all time. The car was replaced by the Nissan Z GT500 for the 2022 season, after the model's 15-years of absence.

=== GT300 ===
The GT-R Nismo GT3 made its Super GT debut in 2012 at the Okayama International Circuit, with drivers Katsumasa Chiyo and Yuhi Sekiguchi. The car won its first race in the fourth round of the season at Sportsland Sugo, and also scored a podium finish in the following round at Suzuka. It was 4th in the final standings. A couple of difficult seasons followed, in 2013 the car failed to score a single podium finish, in 2014 it only managed to win a race. But in the 2013 JAF Grand Prix, team NDDP Racing, with driver Daiki Sasaki won the first race, starting from pole position. In the second race, the car only managed to finish 7th, and ended up being the runner-up of the 2013 JAF Grand Prix. It set the fastest laps in both races, as Nismo Athlete Global Team and NDDP Racing set the fastest laps of the first and second races respectively. The car bounced back in the 2015 season, team Gainer No.10 car, driven by André Couto won the championship, scoring 2 race wins and 4 podium finishes. Including the results of team NDDP Racing, the car finished the season with a total of 4 race wins and 7 podium finishes.

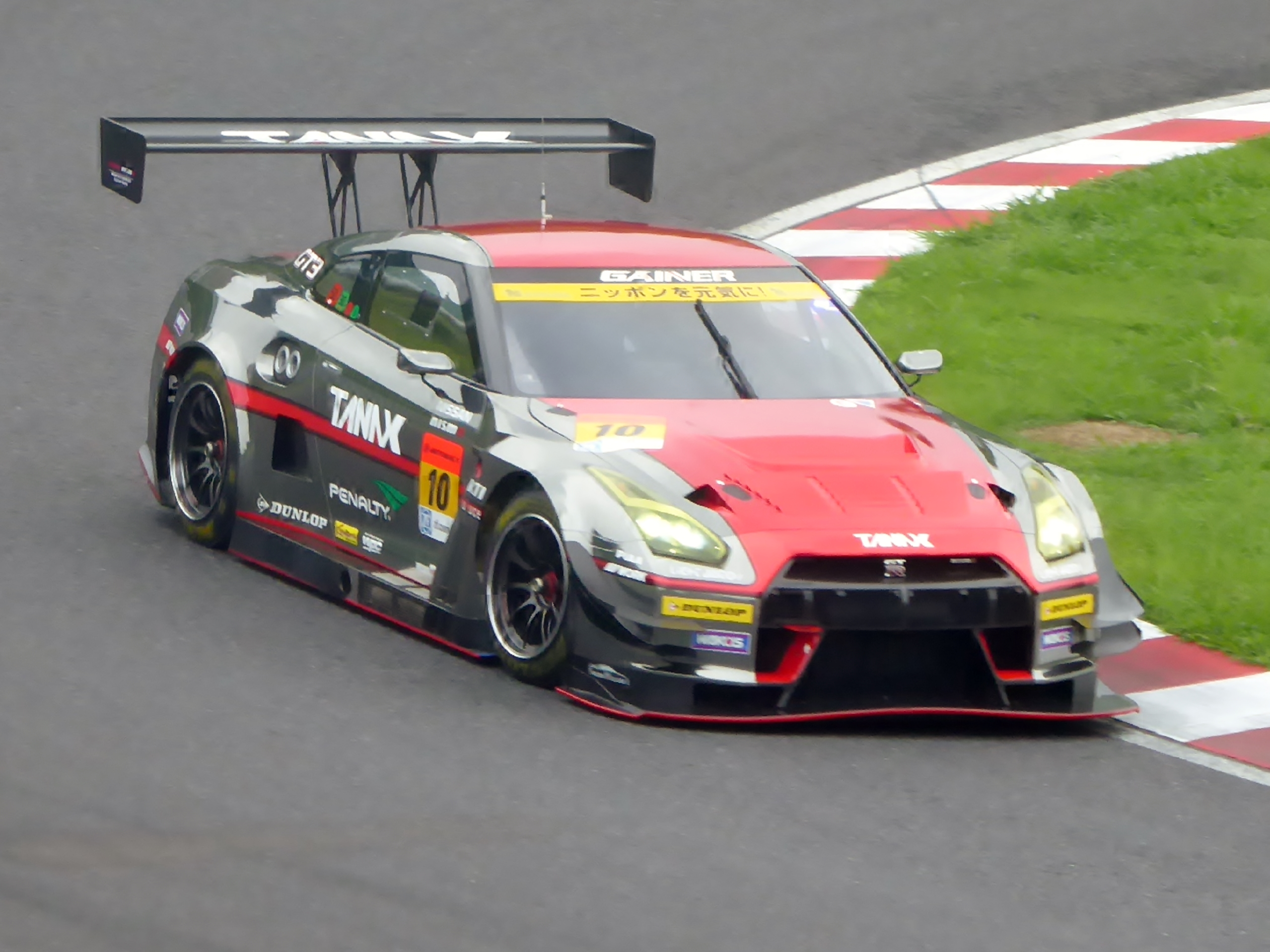
Team Gainer clinched the Super GT GT300 title in 2015 with a GT-R Nismo GT3 (pictured)

In 2016, the reigning champions only managed to achieve a podium finish at the Suzuka 10 Hour round. NDDP Racing finished the season 4th in standings, scored a race win, and 2 podium finishes during the season. In 2017, neither teams were able to score at least a podium finish. In 2018, Gainer participated with two upgraded GT-R Nismo GT3 race cars, No.10 car finished 5th in standings with a race win and two podium finishes, while the other car only managed to score a podium finish. In 2019, Gainer No.11 car won 2 races to finish 3rd in standings. No.10 car also won a race, and Kondo Racing scored a pole position and a podium finish. Kondo Racing with the GT-R Nismo GT3 Evo won the championship in 2020, with drivers Kiyoto Fujinami and João Paulo de Oliveira, they won 2 races and 3 podium finishes. No.11 car achieved a race win and 2 podium finishes, while Tomei Sports managed to score a pole position and a podium finish as well. Reigning champions returned to defend their title in 2021, but was unsuccessful as they finished the season 2nd in standings, with a race win and 3 podium finishes. No.11 car set a fastest lap, a podium finish, and two pole positions during the season.

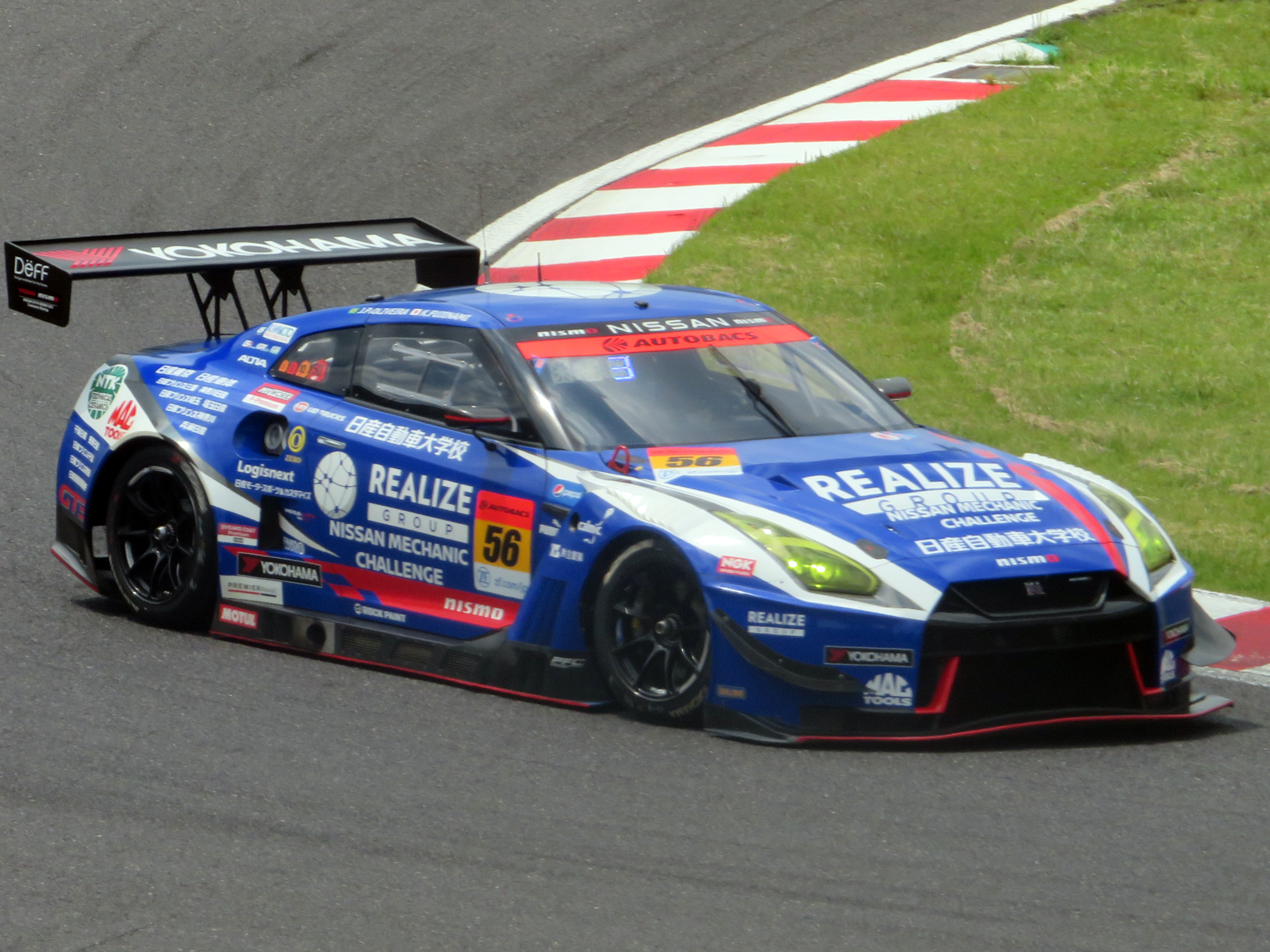
Kondo Racing secured Super GT GT300 titles in 2020 and 2022

Fujinami and Oliveira again won the championship in 2022, with a race win and two podium finishes. It was the record 3rd Super GT GT300 championship double for the car. Gainer No.10 car also won a race win, a pole position, and 3 podium finishes, while the No.11 car achieved 2 podium finishes. For the first time, a third different team, Busou Drago Corse scored a podium finish at the Fuji GT 450 km race. Reigning champions Kondo Racing, along with teams NILZZ Racing, Tomei Sports, and Gainer returned for the 2023 season. Fujinami was replaced by Teppei Natori. Kondo Racing won the second race of the season at Fuji, starting from pole position. Gainer No.11 car won the fourth round again at Fuji. Due to involving in unfortunate incidents, Kondo Racing could only manage to score a single point during both Suzuka and Sugo races, causing threats to their crucial title challenge. In the penultimate round, starting from a disappointing 17th on the grid, the team could only manage to finish 5th in the race. It mathematically eliminated them from the championship battle. The car finished 3rd in standings with 2 race wins, 1 pole position and 2 podium finishes.

2024 was a challenging season for the car, only managing to score 2 podium finishes—both in Fuji during the second and fourth rounds with Kondo Racing. Throughout the year, the car struggled significantly with Balance of Performance (BoP) limitations, which drastically affected its race pace. For the first time in Super GT history, it finished four races outside the points. Oliveira expressed his concerns over the BoP regulations, claimed his team was being targeted due to the car’s competitive form in recent years, and addressed the growing performance imbalance between Group GT3 and GTA-GT300 cars. Whilst GTA-GT300 entries occupying all top three positions, while his team finished 6th in the standings. The team began the 2025 season on a high with a podium finish at the opening round in Okayama. However, BoP-related issues persisted, and the team limited themselves for consistent point finishes in order to maintain favorable BoP adjustments, and improve the chances of competing for the title. The sixth round at Sugo was highly optimistic for the car's championship battle, finishing 2nd—just 0.660 seconds behind the winners—saw the car move up from 5th to 2nd in the drivers' standings. Whilst carrying the highest number of success ballast among the title contenders, the car finished 4th twice, starting from the bottom order in the final two rounds. End of the season, with two podium finishes, it finished 2nd in the drivers' standings by 1 point, also in the teams' standings on count-back, tied on points with champions K2 R&D LEON Racing.

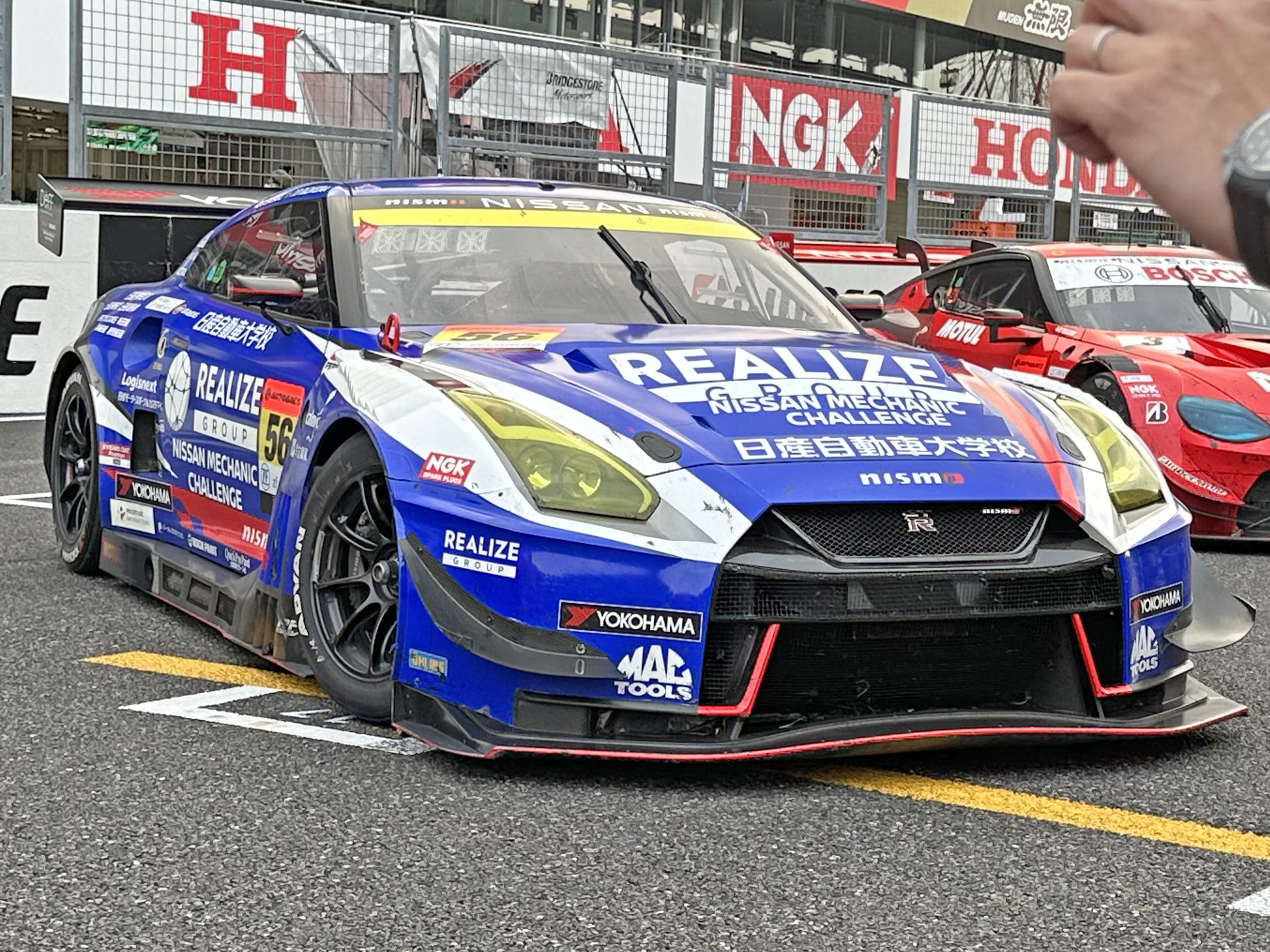
Kondo Racing won their third Super GT GT300 title in 2026

All teams returned for the 2026 season. In the second round of the season at Fuji, Kondo Racing secured the car's first Super GT victory in three years, starting from 6th on the grid. Following a recovery drive from 18th to 5th during the fourth round at Suzuka, the team inherited both drivers' and teams' championship leads. The team headed into the sixth round at Sugo carrying the highest success ballast in the GT300 class. After qualifying 19th, the car climbed into the lead with strong pace and a crucial pitstop strategy. However, with just 12 laps remaining, a GT500 car attempting an overtake made contact and pushed it off track, losing the lead. The car ultimately finished 2nd. In an eventful penultimate round in Autopoils, a safety car period compromised the team's race strategy. They eventually finished 12th. Tomei Sports claimed 2nd place to secure their first podium finish in six years. Heading into the final double-header round at Motegi with a 17-point championship lead, Kondo Racing once again carried the highest success ballast in the class. Having qualified 17th for both races, the team could only manage 14th in the opening race, following a drive-through penalty and a five-second time penalty. Meanwhile, K-tunes Racing, having secured back-to-back victories, emerged as title contenders, trailing by 9 points. In the second race, the team found stronger pace and secured a fourth-place finish, clinching a record-extending fourth Super GT GT300 championship double for the car by a margin of 6 points. It also marked a joint-record third drivers' title victory for Oliveira, and the maiden title for Iori Kimura. Across the season, the car recorded one race victory and 3 podium finishes.

== FIA GT1 World Championship ==
Nissan GT-R GT1
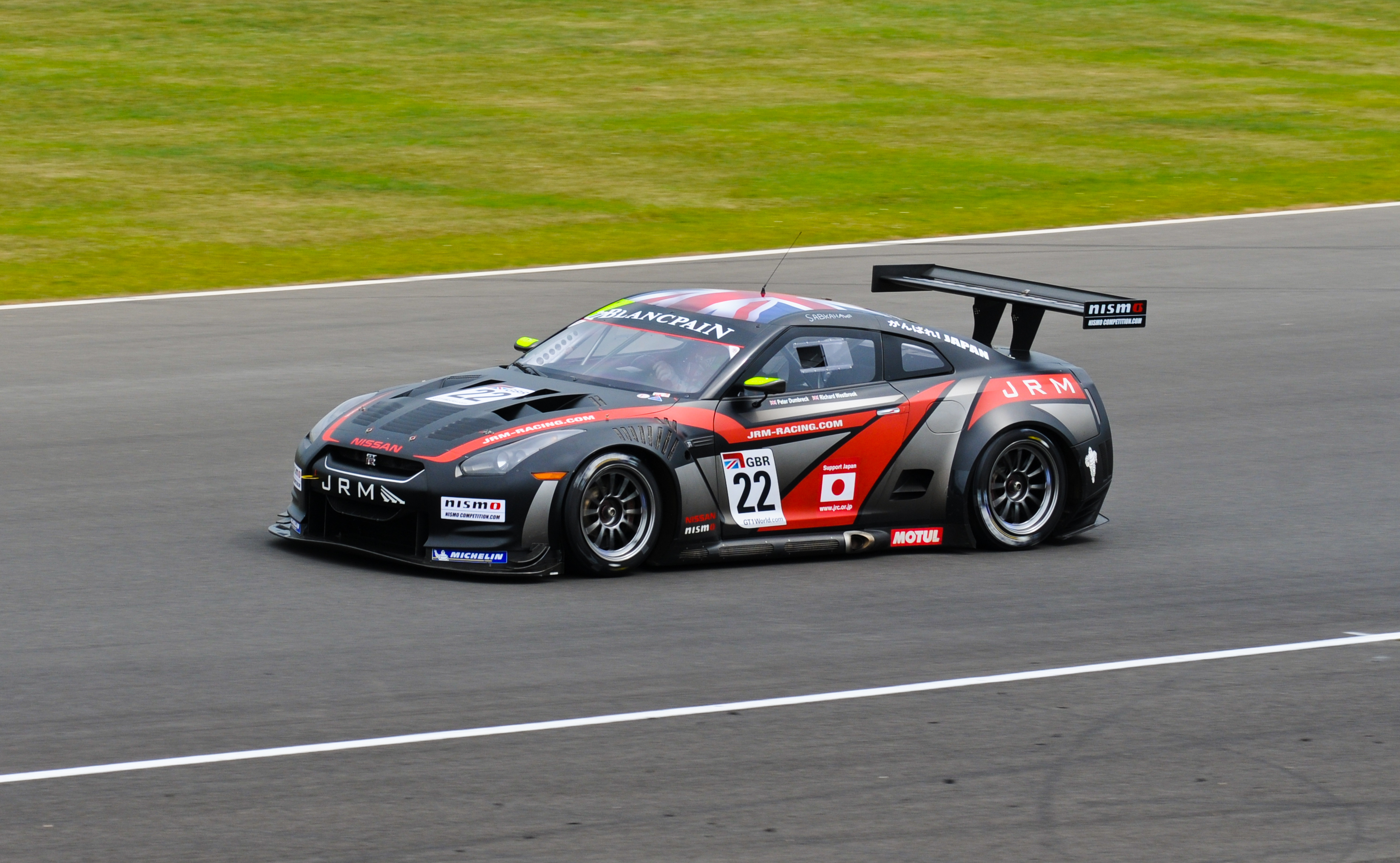
- GT-R GT1
- Category: Group GT1
- Constructor: Nissan
- Predecessor: Nissan R390 GT1
- Successor: Nissan GT-R Nismo GT3

Technical specifications
- Chassis: Aluminium monocoque with carbon-composite front cross member/radiator support
- Suspension (front): Double wishbone, adjustable suspension
- Suspension (rear): Multi-link, adjustable suspension
- Length: 4,730 mm (186 in)
- Width: 2,040 mm (80 in)
- Wheelbase: 2,780 mm (109 in)
- Engine: VK56DE 5.6L (5,552 cc (339 cu in) naturally aspirated V8, front-mid longitudinally mounted, rear-wheel-drive
- Transmission: Ricardo 6-speed transaxle sequential transmission with a lever shifter
- Power: 600 PS (592 hp; 441 kW)
- Weight: 1,250 kg (2,756 lb)
- Fuel: Various
- Lubricants: Motul
- Brakes: Brembo 6-piston calipers with carbon ceramic discs and pads
- Tyres: Michelin 31/71-18 (GT1 controlled specification) with 18×13-inch Rays forged wheels
- Clutch: 5.5-inch carbon triple-plate clutch

Competition history
- Notable entrants: (Switzerland) Swiss Racing Team (United Kingdom) Sumo Power GT (United Kingdom) JR Motorsports
- Notable drivers: (Austria) Karl Wendlinger (United Kingdom) Jamie Campbell-Walter (United Kingdom) Warren Hughes (United Kingdom) Peter Dumbreck (Germany) Michael Krumm (Brazil) Enrique Bernoldi (Brazil) Ricardo Zonta (Netherlands) Nick Catsburg (Australia) David Brabham (United Kingdom) Richard Westbrook (Germany) Lucas Luhr
- Debut: 2010 FIA GT1 Abu Dhabi round
- First win: 2010 RAC Tourist Trophy
- Last win: 2011 FIA GT1 Paul Ricard round
- Last event: 2011 FIA GT1 San Luis round
Races	Wins	Podiums	Poles
20	7	26	3
- Drivers' Championships: 1 (FIA GT1 World Championship, Michael Krumm & Lucas Luhr)

On February 27, 2009, Nismo announced a partnership with British racing team, Gigawave Motorsports to participate in the top tier GT/sports car racing series at the time, the FIA GT1 World Championship. In 2009, the GT-R GT1 was built exclusively for the series, it featured the VK56DE, (5,552 cc (339 cu in) naturally aspirated V8 engine, powering the rear wheels through a Ricardo sequential transmission. The ambition was to fine-tune the performance of the car and to be able to provide customer cars for future customer teams in the upcoming seasons. Nismo driver Michael Krumm and Gigawave driver Darren Turner recruited by the team, former Formula One driver, Anthony Davidson also joined them for the 24 Hours of Spa race, where the car scored an in class podium finish, finishing the race in 3rd position, starting from 8th on the grid. The car was not eligible for championship points, as it was concerned as a factory team.

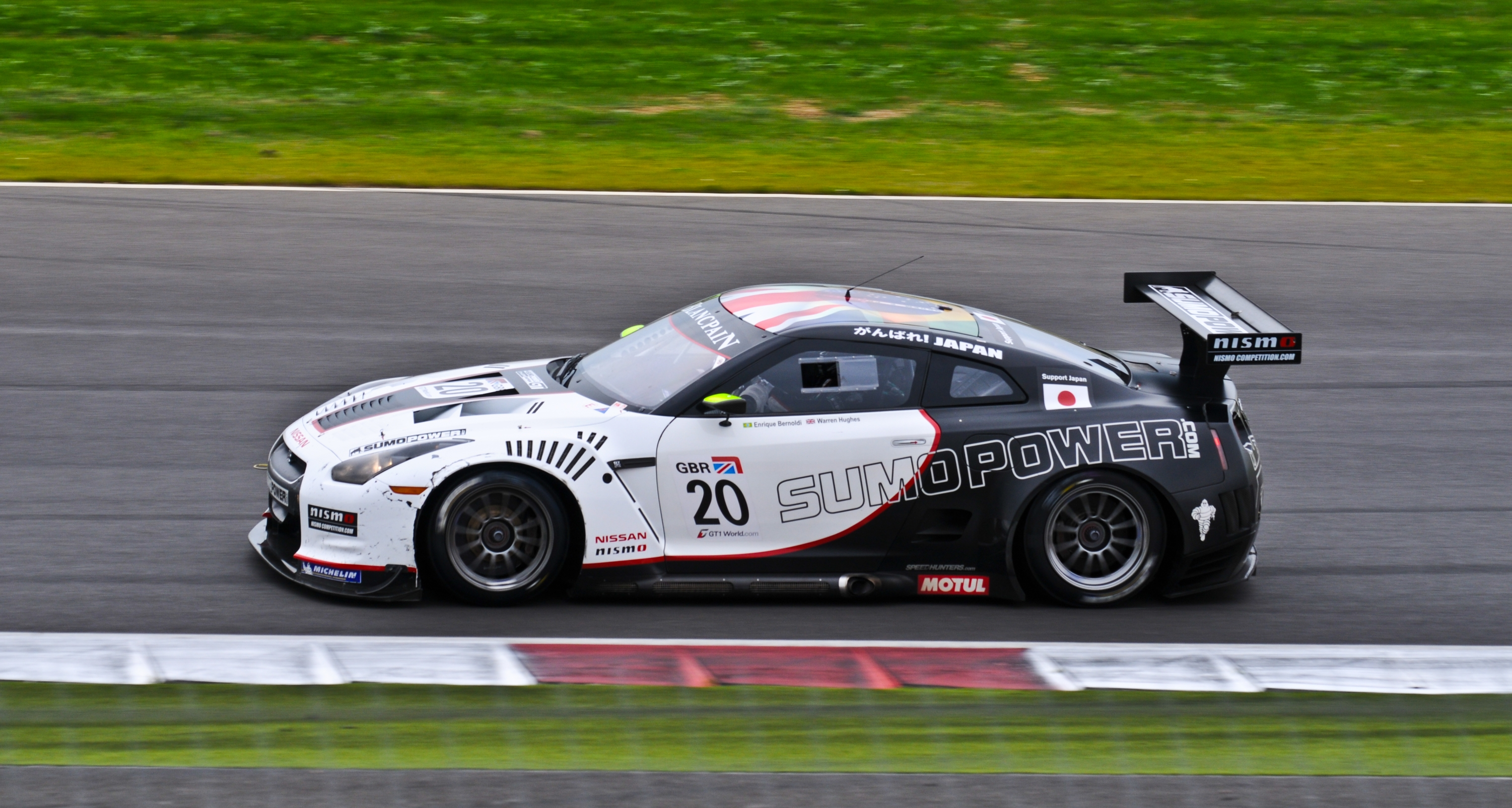
Sumo Power GT scored the first ever FIA GT1 World Championship race victory for the GT-R GT1

In 2010, team Sumo Power GT participated with two cars and drivers, Krumm, Peter Dumbreck, Jamie Campbell-Walter and Warren Hughes. Swiss Racing Team also with two cars and drivers, former Formula One driver Karl Wendlinger, Henri Moser, Max Nilsson and Seiji Ara. The car made its official FIA GT1 World Championship debut in the Abu Dhabi. In the following round, it scored its first race win, Sumo Power GT No.22 car driven by Walter and Hughes secured their qualifying position during the qualifying race and went on to win the championship race by just over two seconds. In the following round at Brno, the No.23 car finished both races in 3rd position to score double podium finishes during the race weekend. Sumo Power GT continued their podium streak into the next round as well, No.22 car finished 3rd in the qualifying race, starting from 5th on the grid and the No.23 car finished 2nd in the championship race. The next major achievement was followed during the seventh round of the season, as the No.23 car with drivers Krumm and Dumbreck won the qualifying race. In the next round at Navarra, the No.22 car again scored a podium finish, finishing 3rd in the championship race, starting from 5th on the grid. The car scored its last podium finish of the season at Interlagos, No.23 car finished the qualifying race in 2nd position, starting from 6th on the grid. End of the season, the No.23 car was 9th in the driver's championship and Sumo Power GT were 6th in the team's championship. The Swiss Racing Team were not that competitive, finishing 10th in the final standings after barely managing to score points during the second, third, and sixth rounds of the season. Although it was the debut season for the car, it finished its competitive outing with 2 race wins and 8 podium finishes.

The 2011 season saw the Swiss Racing Team switching to Lamborghini Murciélago LP670 R-SV race cars, leaving Sumo Power GT running four GT-R GT1 race cars, two under the same team with drivers, Walter, Hughes, Enrique Bernoldi, Ricardo Zonta, Nicky Catsburg and former Formula One driver David Brabham. Two under the sister team JR Motorsports with drivers, Krumm, Dumbreck, Richard Westbrook and Lucas Luhr. In the opening round, JR Motorsports scored a double-podium finish in the qualifying race, No.22 and No.23 cars finished the race 2nd and 3rd respectively. No.22 car maintained 2nd position to score another podium finish in the championship race. The car dominated the third round of the season, all four cars started from the 1st and 2nd rows for the qualifying race. Dumbreck and Westbrook took pole position ahead of the other three GT-R GT1 race cars, which were 2nd, 3rd, and 4th on the grid. In the qualifying race, it was a 1–2–3 finish for the car and a 1–2 finish for JR Motorsports, pole sitters won the race. The momentum continued into the championship race as well, the No.23 car driven by Krumm and Luhr won the race, while the Sumo Power GT No.21 car finished 3rd to score another double podium finish.

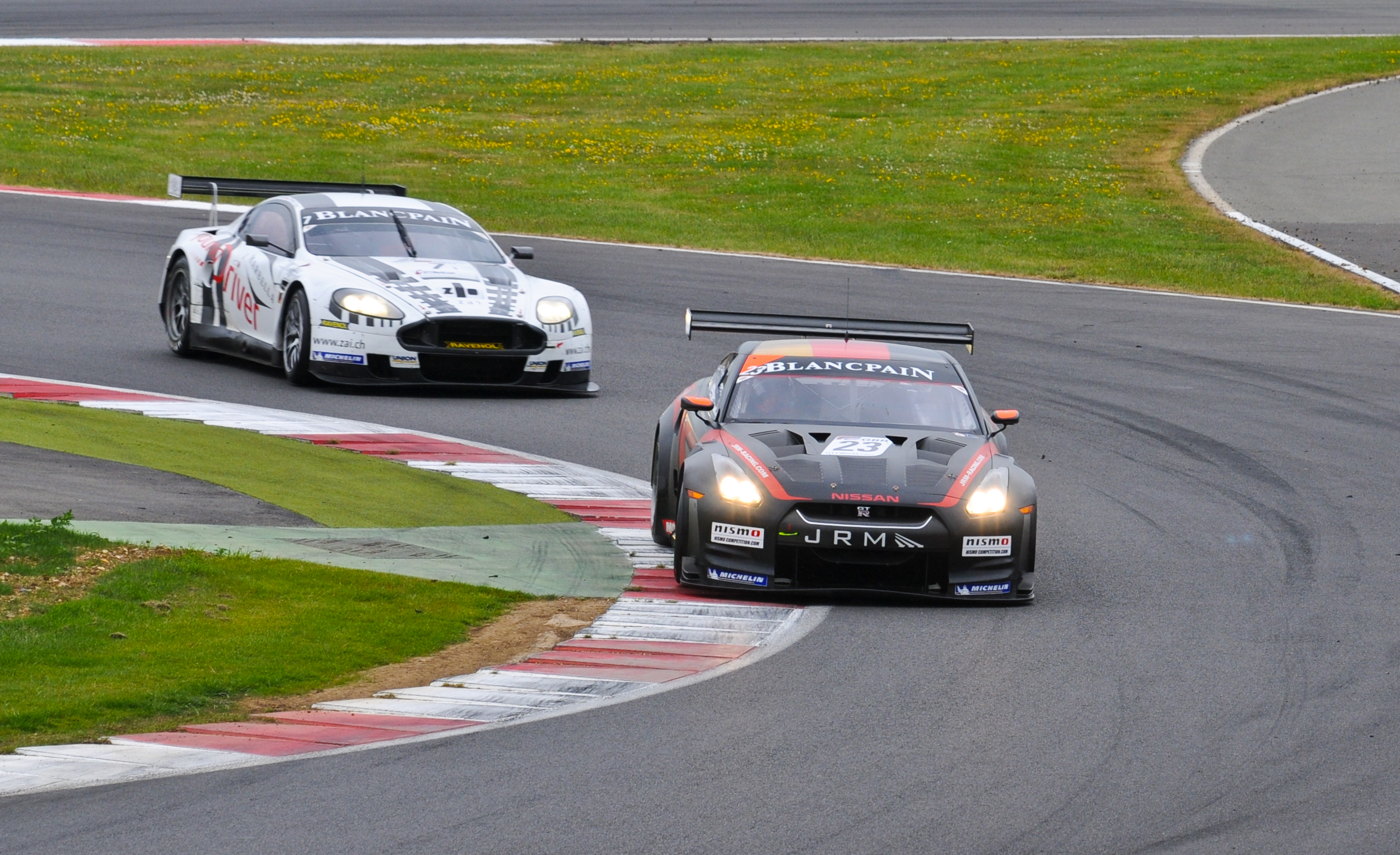
The intense battle for the lead at Silverstone

In the fifth round at Silverstone, it was again a double-podium race weekend for the car, as the No.23 car finished 2nd in the qualifying race and won the championship race following an intense battle between the team Young Driver AMR's Aston Martin DBR9. In the following round, the No.21 car finished 3rd in the championship race to score a podium finish. During the seventh round of the season, JR Motorsports again dominated the whole weekend. Qualified 1st and 2nd, the No.23 car won both qualifying and championship races. In the following round at Ordos, the No.22 car finished 2nd in both races to score two podium finishes, while the No.21 car also finished on the podium in 3rd position. In the ninth round, the No.23 car finished 3rd in the championship race to score another podium finish, starting from 4th on the grid. Heading onto the final round at San Luis, the No.23 car was just a point behind the driver's championship leaders. It took pole position and finished 2nd in the qualifying race, winning the driver's championship for Krumm and Luhr by over 17 points. In the championship race, due to a racing incident in the opening lap, the car was forced to retire and was unable to score points during the race. No.22 car served a drive-through penalty while leading the race and finished 8th, missing out on winning the team's championship by just 3 points. JR Motorsports were 2nd in the teams' championship, while Sumo Power GT were 5th. The car finished the season with 5 race wins, 3 pole positions, and 18 podium finishes. It was the last competitive outing for the car, as in 2012 GT1 cars got replaced by GT3 cars and Nissan did not return to defend their title with a GT3 variant of the GT-R.

== Group GT3 ==
Nissan GT-R Nismo GT3
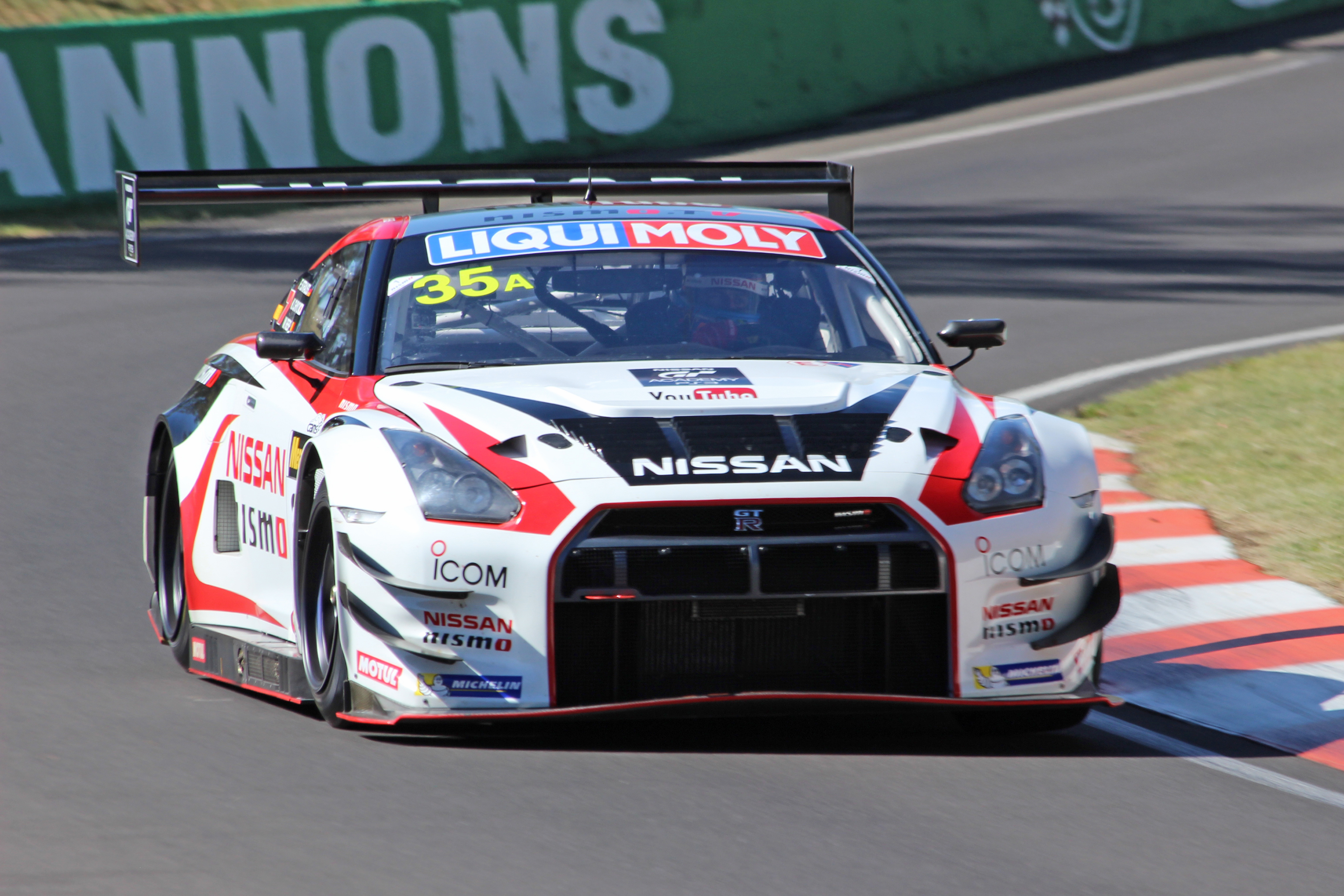
- GT-R Nismo GT3
- Category: Group GT3
- Constructor: Nissan
- Predecessor: Nissan GT-R GT1; Nissan 350Z GT300

Technical specifications
- Chassis: Aluminium monocoque with carbon-composite front cross member/radiator support
- Suspension (front): Double wishbone, adjustable suspension
- Suspension (rear): Multi-link (2011–2017); Double wishbone (2018–2022), adjustable suspension
- Length: 4,780 mm (188 in)
- Width: 1,998 mm (79 in) (2011–2012); 2,036 mm (80 in) (2013–2022)
- Wheelbase: 2,780 mm (109 in)
- Engine: VR38DETT 3.8L (3,799 cc (232 cu in) twin-turbocharged V6, front-mid longitudinally mounted, rear-wheel-drive
- Transmission: Ricardo 6-speed transaxle sequential transmission with paddle shifters, multi-disc limited-slip differential with traction control
- Power: 530–550 PS (523–542 hp; 390–405 kW) (2011–2012); 550–600 PS (542–592 hp; 405–441 kW) (2013–2022)
- Weight: 1,300 kg (2,866 lb) (2011–2017); 1,285 kg (2,833 lb) (2018–2022)
- Fuel: Various
- Lubricants: Various
- Brakes: Brembo 6-piston (front) & 4-piston (rear) calipers with ventilated discs and pads
- Tyres: Various, 30/71-18 (GT3 controlled specification) with 18×13-inch Rays forged wheels
- Clutch: Metal, 5.5-inch carbon 4 plate

Competition history
- Notable entrants: (United Kingdom) GT Academy Team RJN (United Kingdom) JR Motorsports (Japan) Kondo Racing (Japan) Team Gainer (Japan) GTNET Motorsports (Japan) HELM Motorsports (Hong Kong) KCMG
- Notable drivers: (United Kingdom) Alex Buncombe (United Kingdom) Jann Mardenborough (Spain) Lucas Ordóñez (United Kingdom) Straun Moore (Belgium) Wolfgang Reip (Japan) Katsumasa Chiyo (Macau) André Couto (Japan) Kiyoto Fujinami (Brazil) João Paulo de Oliveira (Japan) Kazuki Hoshino (Japan) Iori Kimura
- Debut: 2011 Blancpain Endurance Series Magny-Cours round
- First win: 2012 Sugo GT 300 km
Races	Wins	Podiums	Poles
467	102	287	83
- Teams' Championships: 11 (1 GT WC Europe Endurance Cup, 4 Super GT & 6 Super Taikyu)
- Drivers' Championships: 14 (2 GT WC Europe Endurance Cup, 4 Super GT, 6 Super Taikyu, 1 British GT & 1 ADAC GT Masters)

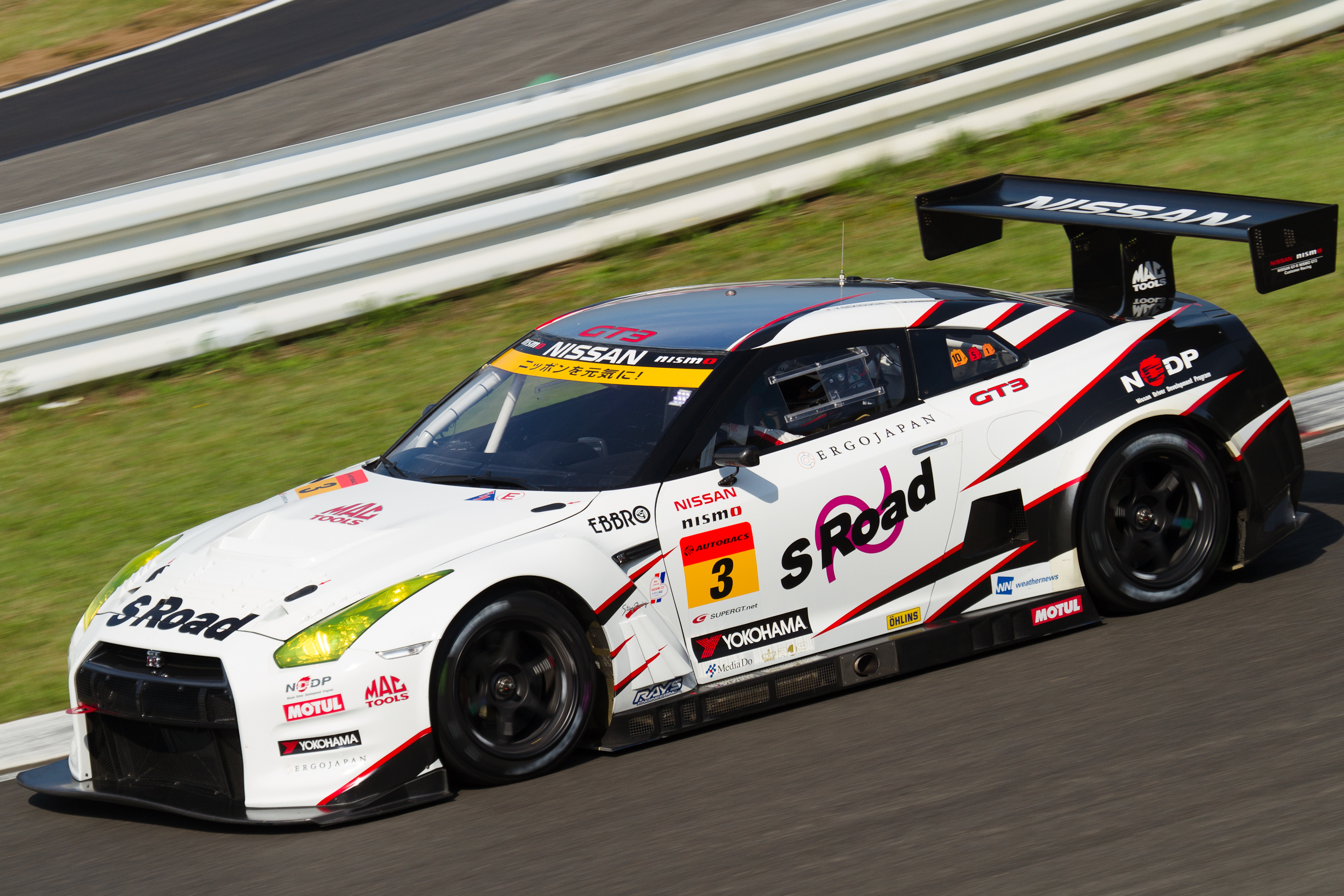
2012 model year GT-R Nismo GT3

Due to the 2011 GT1 World Championship being the last possible competitive outing for the GT-R GT1, Nissan were forced to develop a GT3 variant of the GT-R. Nismo and JR Motorsports joint team immediately began development of the GT-R Nismo GT3. Following numerous testing sessions and three competitive race outings, the car was soon proven to be competitive enough for customer racing teams. It was officially introduced in a press release in January 2012, and was claimed to be fully conformed with Group GT3 regulations. It featured the standard VR38DETT engine with a power output of 390 kW (530 PS; 523 hp) at 6,400 rpm, working in conjunction with a Ricardo six-speed sequential transmission, providing power to the rear wheels. Fitted with an adjustable suspension setup and driver controls, the chassis was also re-tuned for competitive racing. Sales and services were provided by Nissan in Japan, Asia, and North America, and by JR Motorsports in Europe, Russia, and the Middle East as well. Nissan were the first Japanese automobile manufacturer to sell a Group GT3 race car, the GT-R Nismo GT3 was sold to numerous customer racing teams throughout the years. Keeping up with the competition, Nismo offered several update kits, with the first update as early as 2013.

2013 update

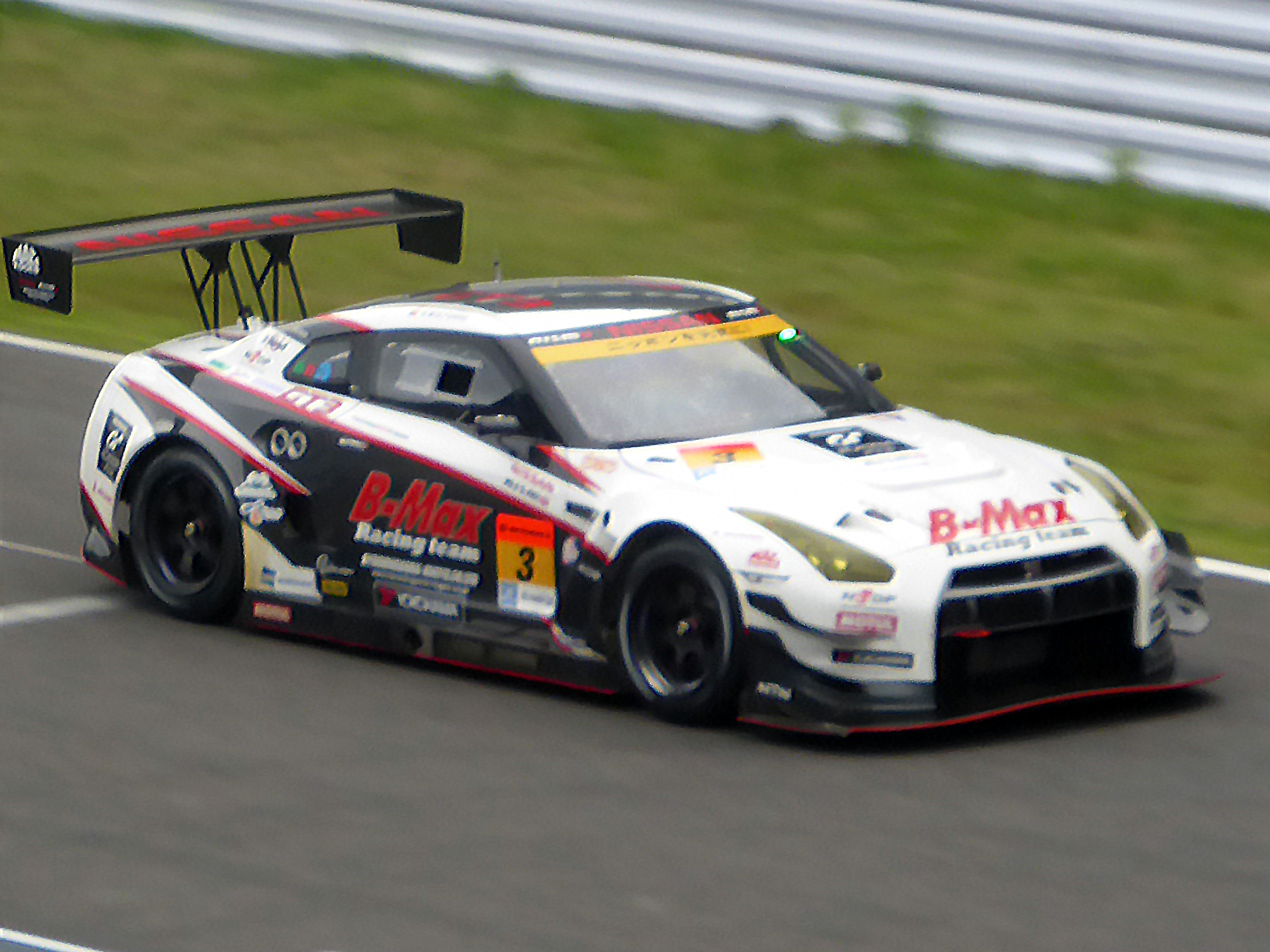
2013 model year updated GT-R Nismo GT3

The car featured significant performance upgrades for the year 2013. Increased engine output to 405 kW (551 PS; 543 hp) at 6,500 rpm, due to new camshaft timing and reinforced engine parts. Gear ratios were changed to optimize the increase in power. Front canards and a re-positioned rear wing, increased overall downforce without any changes in drag. Additionally, the suspension setup and brake balance were enhanced to further improve handling. In 2014, the car received minor upgrades to reduce running cost and improve reliability. In 2015, fuel efficiency was improved, along with better weight distribution and refined aerodynamics.

2016 update

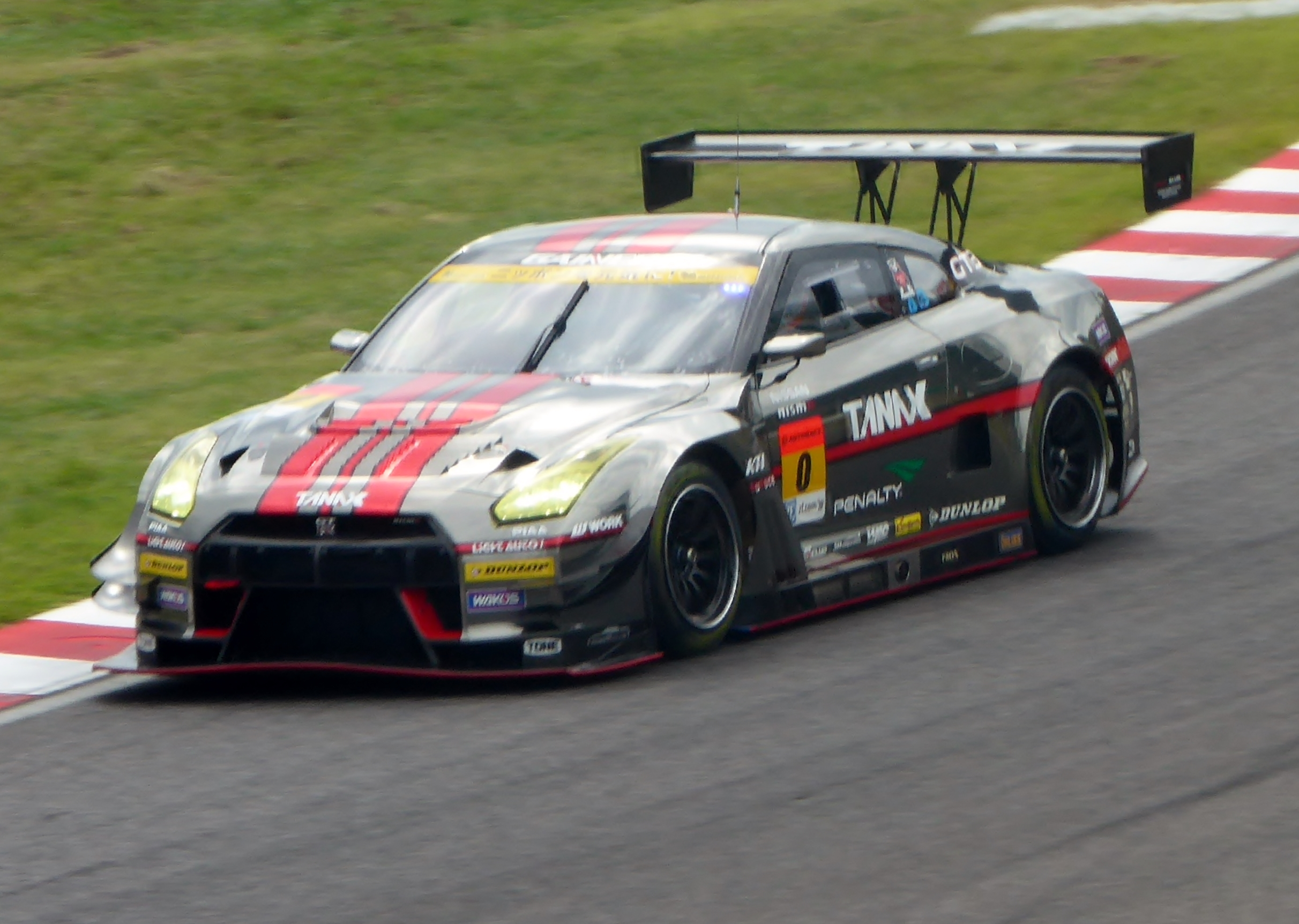
2016 model year updated GT-R Nismo GT3

The car received another major update in 2016. Nismo claimed the updated GT-R Nismo GT3 is faster, lighter, and more fuel-efficient than the previous model. It was fitted with a new brake system, including larger AP Racing brake rotors, calipers, and master cylinders, to provide more stopping power. Weight distribution was improved by moving the starter motor to the rear transaxel, lowering air jacks, revising the steering column and driver seating position, refining chassis brackets, revising the wiring harness and carbon-fibre air intake pipes. The car was also proved to be aero efficient than before, as Nismo engineers made the front dive planes, rear diffuser, front and rear bumpers more effective with the help of wind tunnel and trackside testing. Driver safety was also concerned, offered with a lowered dashboard and a flat-bottom steering wheel to improve visibility. Additional side roll cage tubes were added to improve side protection.

2018 update

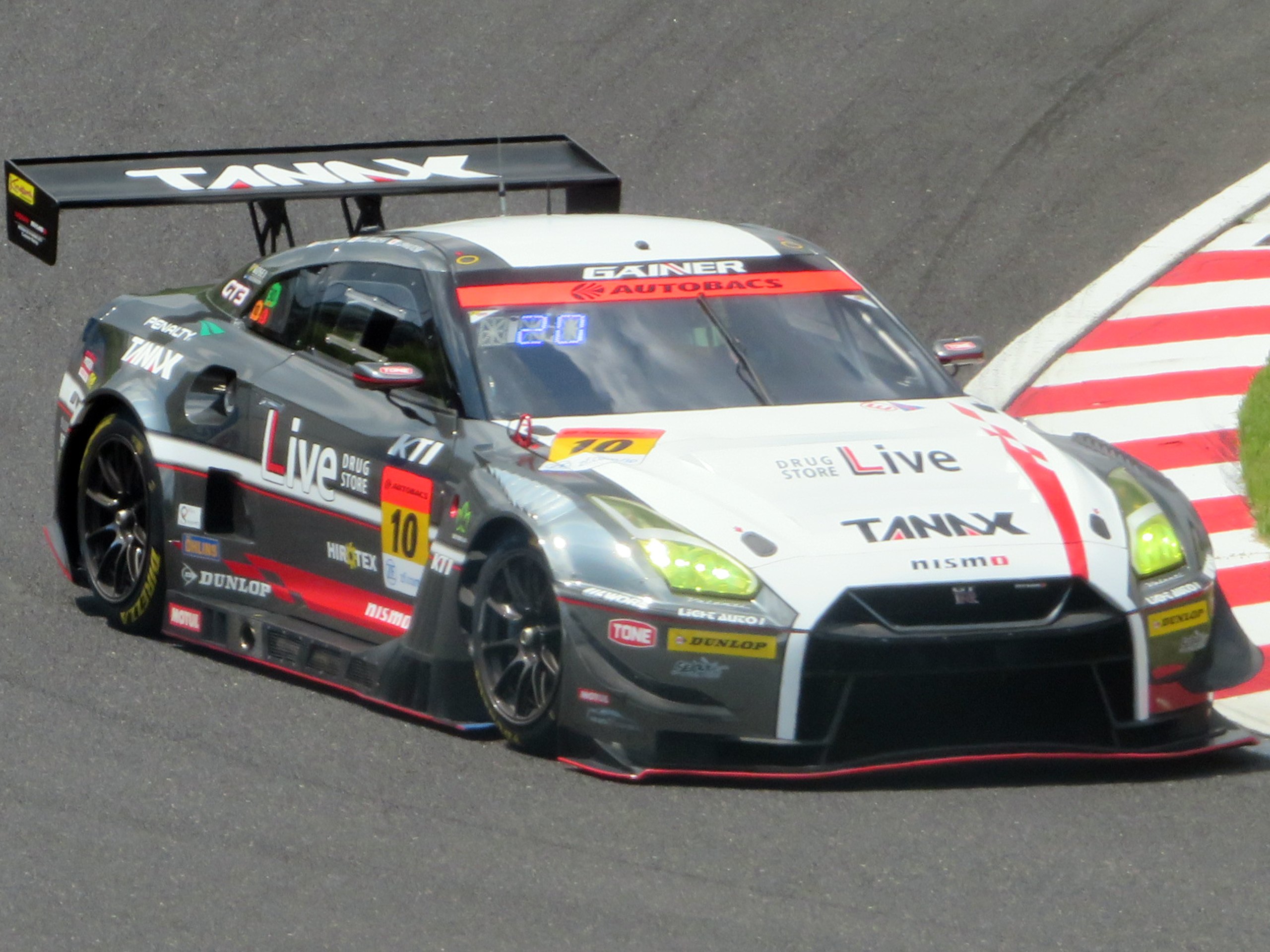
2018 model year updated GT-R Nismo GT3

In 2018, the GT-R Nismo GT3 received its road car facelift and other upgrades as well. Lowered centre of gravity and further improved weight distribution, significant changes were made over the previous specification. The engine was moved backward and lowered by 150 mm (5.9 in) due to a thin oil pan. The entire drivetrain and driver seating positioning were lowered to the ground, further lowering the centre of gravity and improving weight distribution. The enhanced aerodynamic package featured optimized airflow inside the engine compartment, and a refined layout of air inlets, outlets, radiator, and intercooler produced more downforce and improved cooling. Driver comfort was improved by redesigning the steering wheel and centre console switch panel, and an optional air conditioning system was also offered. The rear suspension setup was changed to a double-wishbone system. Nismo claimed the upgrades led the car to reduce its weight by around 15 kg (33 lb), and improve driving stability, handling, and downforce while reducing drag. The car received minor upgrades in 2020. Which include, repositioned cockpit switches, the introduction of a Power Distribution Module (PDM), upgraded ABS, and TCS systems. The upgraded version was renamed as the "GT-R Nismo GT3 Evo".

Departing from racing

At the end of 2017, Nissan/Nismo officially withdrew from participating in international GT3 racing as a manufacturer, due to the interest of participating in Formula E. But resumed providing technical support for customer racing teams. At the end of 2019, Nissan did not renew their relationship with the customer team KCMG, which saw the end of the car's presence in international racing events, outside of Japan. It has competed in almost every major Group GT3 championships and has won several titles. In 2026, it participated in the Super GT GT300 class, and 2026 GT World Challenge Asia (including 2026 SRO Japan Cup). The car is FIA homologated for use until the end of 2030.

=== GT World Challenge Europe Endurance Cup ===
The GT-R Nismo GT3 participated in the GT World Challenge Europe Endurance Cup (known as the Blancpain Endurance Series at the time). The car was proved to be successful in this tremendously competitive championship. Despite making its debut in the fourth round of the 2011 season at Magny-Cours, it was not in championship contention, only raced in the fourth and fifth rounds of the season. But it had good enough pace to finish an impressive 6th in Pro class, as well as to set the fastest lap of its debut race. 2012 season was also similar, only competed in the first to fourth rounds of the season.

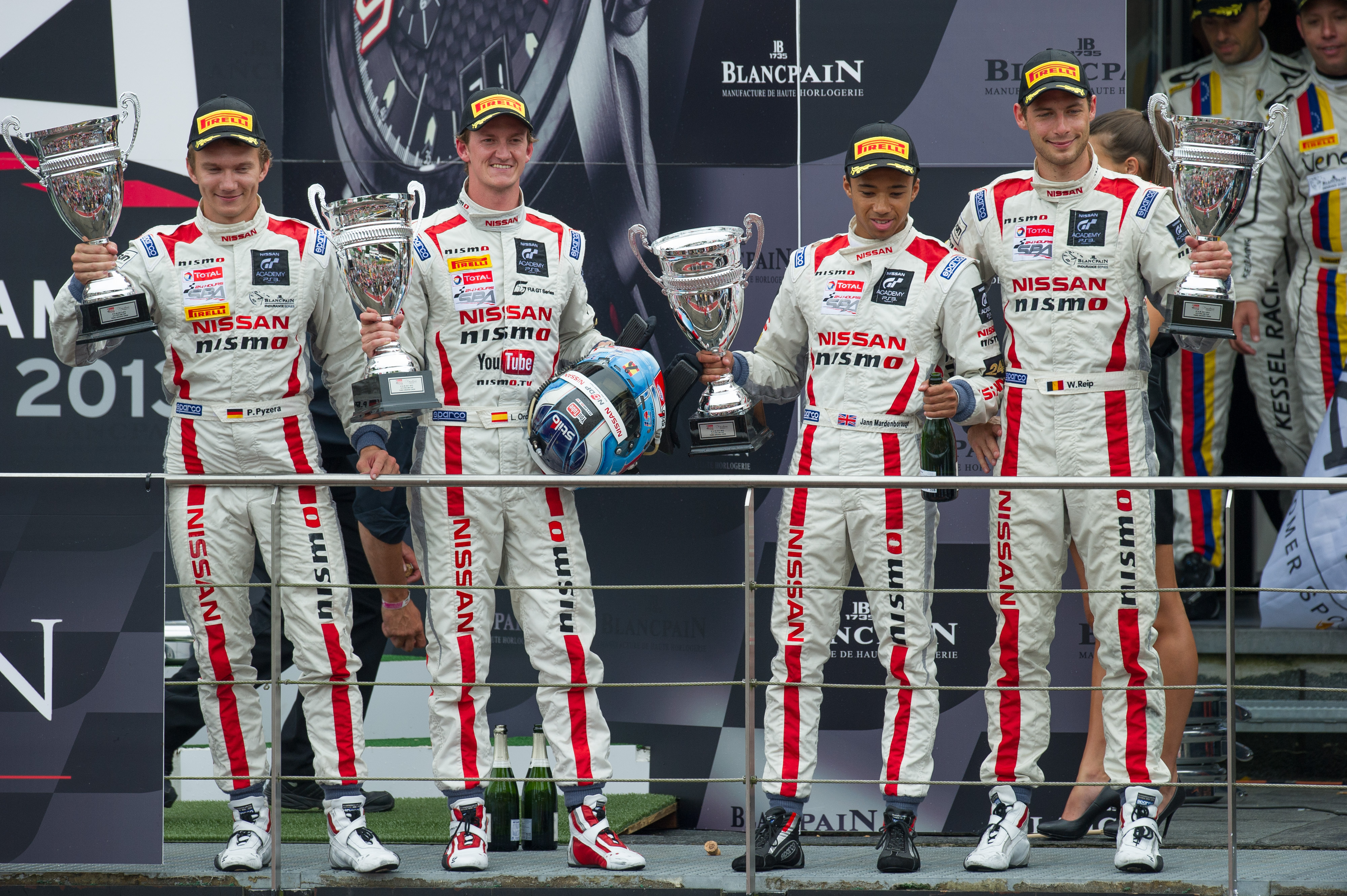
Pyzera, Ordoñez, Mardenborough and Reip (from left), on the podium of Spa 24 Hour race in 2013

2013 was the first full season the car participated in, and it was soon proved to be a successful season as well. In the second round at Silverstone, the car scored its first race win. Driven by Lucas Ordóñez, Peter Pyzera, and Alex Buncombe, claimed overall pole position as well as the race win in Pro-Am class. It scored a double-podium finish in the following round at Paul Ricard, with JR Motorsports and GT Academy, and took the championship lead in Pro-Am championship. Following another podium finish in the challenging 24 Hours of Spa, GT Academy ultimately won the Pro-Am team's championship in the final round at Nürburgring, by beating the Ferrari works team, AF Corse. Ordóñez won the Pro-Am driver's championship, while Pyzera and Buncombe finished 3rd and 4th in the final standings respectively. The car was able to win a race, take a pole position, and 4 podium finishes during the season. The team returned for the 2014 season to defend their title. In the second round at Silverstone, starting from 3rd on the grid, the car managed to win the Pro-Am class after an intense between an Aston Martin Vantage GT3. It also scored a podium finish at Paul Ricard as well. In the final round at Nürburgring, it took Pro-Am pole position and led the race in the early stages, due to a gearbox issue it was forced to pit and lost positions, missing out on winning the team's championship. End of the season, the car was 4th in the team's championship, tied on points with the team AF Corse, and 7th in the driver's championship with a race win, a pole position, and 2 podium finishes.

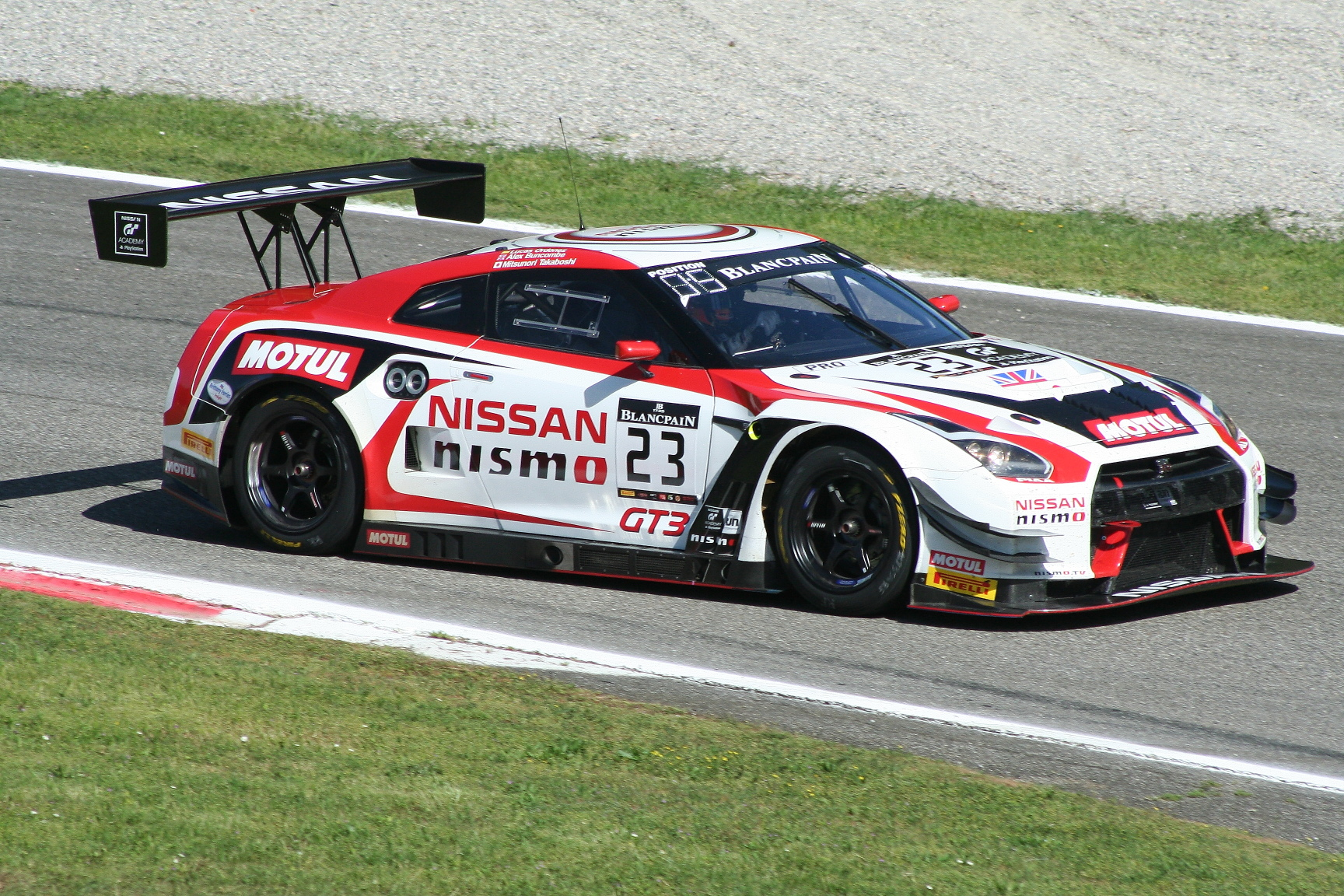
The GT-R Nismo GT3 at Monza

In 2015, the GT-R Nismo GT3 was raced in both Pro and Pro-Am classes. It took pole position and finished on the podium in the second round of the season at Silverstone. Winning an impressive overall race, starting from 2nd at Paul Ricard, it was in championship battle heading onto the final round at Nürburgring. The car qualified 2nd and managed to finish the race in 3rd to score another podium finish, and won the driver's championship for Buncombe, Chiyo and Wolfgang Reip, although GT Academy finished 3rd in the team's championship. The sister car from the Pro-Am class took pole position in the final race as well. The GT-R Nismo GT3 won a race, scored 2 pole positions and 3 podiums to finish another successful season. In 2016, reigning champions were unsuccessful to defend their title. Although they started on with a strong 4th-place finish at Monza, unfortunate incidents in Silverstone, Paul Ricard, and 24 Hours of Spa races made the team lack on points. The car was 7th in the team's championship and 9th in the driver's championship. A podium finish at the Nürburgring, starting from 11th on the grid secured its successive podium streak.

GT Academy quit being the title sponsor in 2017, and Motul as a replacement joined the Nissan works team. Similar incidents to the previous season resulted in another unsuccessful season for the car, with a 5th-place finish at Paul Ricard being the best result of the season. The car finished the season again 7th in the team's championship, with neither a race win nor a podium finish. In 2018, Nissan and Nismo did not return, instead a customer team, GT Sport participated in the championship. The team finished on the podium in Silver Cup class at Silverstone, starting from 7th on the grid. The car consistently finished on points for the rest of the season to finish 6th in the Silver Cup driver's championship and 12th in the overall team's championship standings. 2019 was the last season the car participated in, with team KCMG it was not in championship contention, only raced in the 24 Hours of Spa.

=== GT World Challenge Europe Sprint Cup ===
In 2013, the FIA GT1 World Championship was replaced by the GT World Challenge Europe Sprint Cup (known as the FIA GT Series at the time). Nissan GT Academy Team RJN made their debut with the GT-R Nismo GT3 in the Pro-Am class. In the inaugural 2013 season, it finished on the podium in every race it participated in. It did not race in the final round at Baku, as the team withdrew the race in order to participate in the 2013 Dubai 24 Hour race with the 370Z GT4, missing out in a possible team's championship win. End of the season, it was 2nd in the team's championship and 5th in the driver's championship with 2 wins, 2 pole positions and 10 podium finishes. The car did not return for the 2014 season. But in 2015, only for the fourth round at Moscow, where GT Academy finished on the podium in Pro-Am class. End of the season, a customer racing team, MRS GT-Racing/Always Involving Motorsport were 7th in the team's championship and 14th in the driver's championship with a podium finish in the second round at Brands Hatch. In 2016, GT Academy participated in both Pro and Silver classes. Finished 4th in the Silver class driver's championship with 2 podium finishes at Brands Hatch and Hungaroring. It was the last appearance of a GT-R Nismo GT3 in this championship.

=== GT World Challenge Asia ===
The GT-R Nismo GT3 made its GT World Challenge Asia (known as the Blancpain GT World Challenge Asia at the time) debut in 2018, with team KCMG in Pro-Am and Silver Cup classes. In the second round at Buriram, the car achieved its maiden podium finish. After serving a drive-through penalty, it finished 2nd and set the fastest lap of the race. Following 2 race wins, 3 pole positions, fastest laps, and 11 podium finishes, it finished its successful debut season 2nd in the Pro-Am driver's championship and 5th in the Silver Cup driver's championship, and 4th in the overall team's championship.

The GT-R Nismo GT3 Evo with RunUp Sports and Team 5ZIGEN participated in the 2023 SRO Japan Cup, which included the Japanese rounds of 2023 GT World Challenge Asia. Both teams competed under Am and Pro-Am classes respectively. At the end of the season, RunUp Sports finished 2nd in class standings with consistent points finishes throughout the year. 5ZIGEN scored 2 race wins and a podium at Suzuka and Okayama rounds respectively. Unfortunate incidents in other races saw the team withdraw from the Motegi round, mathematically eliminating them from championship contention. The team finished the season 5th in overall standings.

In 2024, 5ZIGEN switched to the Silver-Am class, while RunUp Sports and GTNET Motorsports yielded their cars for the 2024 SRO Japan Cup, under the Am class but the latter only for the second and fourth rounds. 5ZIGEN finished 2nd in class standings with 3 race wins, 1 pole position, and 6 podium finishes. Including an overall victory in the Suzuka round, where it fended-off a Porsche 911 (992) GT3 R to the finishing line by just 0.206 seconds to claim its first GT World Challenge victory since 2021. In the Japan Cup, the car finished 3rd in class standings with a total of 5 podium finishes, 3 scored by RunUp Sports in Sugo and Suzuka rounds, and 2 scored by GTNET Motorsports in the Okayama round.

All teams returned for their respective series in 2025, with JMS Racing fielding an additional car into the second round of 2025 SRO Japan Cup, where it secured a pole position and a podium finish. 5ZIGEN entered the season with changes to their driver lineup. However, with a number poor results and just 43 points scored in the first half of the season, the team decided to re-sign their former driver, Hiromasa "Hirobon" Kitano. The team's form improved significantly, as the car finished on the podium in all of the subsequent rounds, and out-scoring the rest of the grid. Winning both races at the penultimate round in Okayama ensured that the team was still in championship contention. In the final round in Beijing, after securing the overall win of the first race starting from seventh on the grid, the car could only manage to finish 4th in the following race. Finishing runner-up in the championship with 5 race wins, 2 pole positions and 7 podium finishes. In the Japan Cup, GTNET Motorsports, having missed the opening round in Sugo, finished 2nd in class standings with a race win, 2 pole positions and 5 podium finishes. RunUp Sports finished 3rd with 3 podium finishes.

5ZIGEN entered the 2026 season with an all-new driver line-up, with drivers Takayuki Aoki, Atsushi Miyake, and Kimiya Sato. The team started the season strongly, with double-podium finishes in Silver class at both opening rounds of the season. Followed by two more podium finishes, the team secured their first class win of the season at Fuji. Promoting them to 3rd in the Silver cup standings. Their championship hopes suffered a major setback during the penultimate round in Beijing. After finishing second in the opening race, a collision in the second round—while leading the class—forced them into retirement. The team headed into the final round with an outside chance of claiming the title, trailing by 32 points. A mechanical failure in the opening race saw the car finish 4th in class, ending its championship contention. The team secured the class victory in the second race. They ultimately finished 3rd in the Silver class standings, with 2 race wins and pole positions, and 9 podium finishes. Team RunUp Sports returned for the 2026 SRO Japan Cup, GalahRacing with another GT-R Nismo GT3 Evo entered the second round of the season at Fuji under the Pro-Am class. RunUp Sports finished 5th in Am class standings, with 2 rounds withdrawn and 3 podium finishes scored across the season.

=== GT World Challenge America ===
In 2015, Nissan officially announced entry into the GT World Challenge America (known as the Pirelli World Challenge at the time), with team AE Replay XD Nissan GT Academy. In the fourth round at Birmingham, the car scored its first race win, starting from pole position and driven by James Davison. Its consistent performance led to 7 consecutive podium finishes, starting from Wisconsin to Utah rounds, including a race win at Road America and a fastest lap at Ohio as well. Mid-season driver changes resulted in losing the potential of winning the GTA class championship, it made the car ineligible for points although it scored multiple race wins, pole positions, fastest laps, and podium finishes. End of the season, it was 4th in GT class driver's championship with 3 wins, a pole position, fastest lap and 10 podium finishes, while 5th in the team's championship.

The team returned for the 2016 season, The car started the season on a high, it finished 2nd in the opening race and set the fastest lap. In the next race, it claimed a pole position as well. It repeated the same result at St. Petersburg and Bowmanville rounds. Including 2 back-to-back race wins at Utah, 2 additional podium finishes were followed at Ohio and Laguna Seca rounds. The car finished the season 5th in the driver's championship and 4th in the team's championship. It did not participate since 2017. But in 2018, with teams Nissan Motorsports North America and Always Involving Motorsport, only for the third round at Streets of Long Beach.

=== GT World Challenge Australia ===
Having participated in a few races in the past seasons, the GT-R Nismo GT3 made its full season GT World Challenge Australia (known as Australian GT Championship at the time) debut in 2021. Driver Brett Hobson with Hobson Motorsport chose to race with the same car, used by Nissan in the 2016 Bathurst 12 Hour. It raced under the GT Trophy class. Beginning of a successful season, it won its maiden race and finished on the podium in the opening round at Phillip Island. Following another race win, pole position, and a podium finish, the car required a complete refresh before the championship-deciding final round at Mount Panorama, despite a gearbox issue. Ultimately, it dominated the whole weekend with back-to-back race wins and pole positions. Although it failed to start and retired from a couple of races during the season, it made an impressive comeback to finish 2nd in the final standings, 8 points behind the championship-winning Audi R8 LMS Ultra. End of the season, the car scored 4 race wins, 3 pole positions, and finished every race in the podium to score 6 podium finishes. The team returned for the 2022 season, but only for the first round at Phillip Island, where it took a pole position and scored a double-podium finish.

=== Intercontinental GT Challenge ===
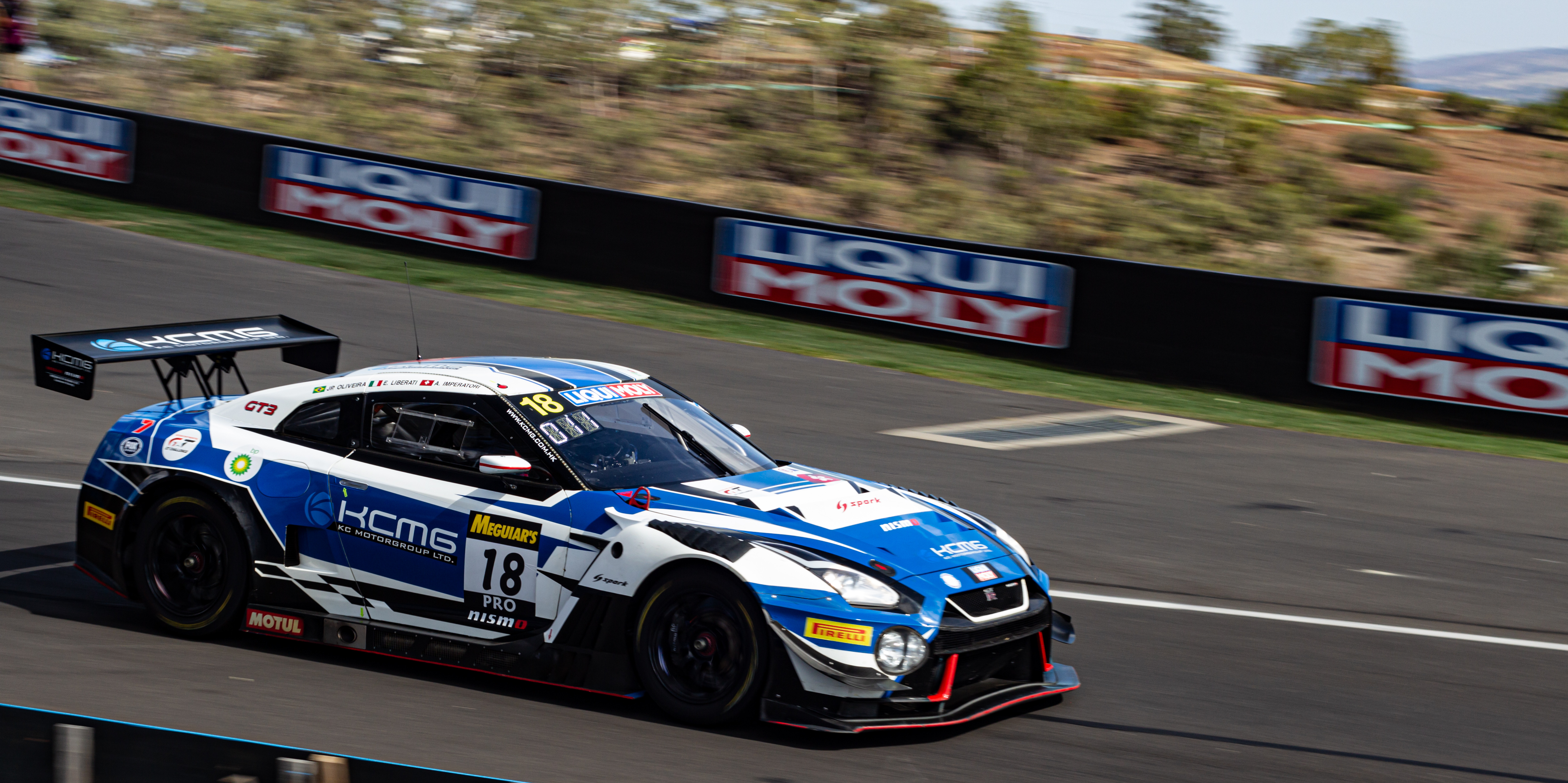
The GT-R Nismo GT3 of team KCMG

Having only participated in the Bathurst 12 Hour and Spa 24 Hours in 2017, 2019 was the first and only full season, a GT-R Nismo GT3 was raced in the Intercontinental GT Challenge. Team KCMG with an updated 2018-spec car, managed to score points in every race of the season. It also set the fastest laps in Bathurst 12 Hour and California 8 Hours. It was the only GT championship where the car did not manage to score a podium finish. End of the season, it was 6th in the manufacturer's championship, just a point behind Ferrari.

=== British GT Championship ===
The GT-R Nismo GT3 made its British GT Championship debut in 2012, with team RJN Motorsport, and drivers Buncombe and Jann Mardenborough. It set its maiden pole position as well as the podium finish in the first round at Nürburgring. In the fourth round at Brands Hatch, it scored its first race win starting from 10th on the grid. It finished on the podium again at Snetterton Circuit. The car was 6th in the final standings with a race win, pole position, and 3 podium finishes. In 2013, JR Motorsport participated in the championship instead, but only for the first and second rounds of the season. Nissan GT Academy Team RJN scored a podium finish at Spa-Francorchamps, in 2014. Since then, 2018 was the first and final full season, a GT-R Nismo GT3 was raced in the British GT Championship. RJN Motorsport participated under Silver Cup class, Straun Moore won the championship after taking pole positions and winning every race the car participated in.

=== Super Taikyu Series ===
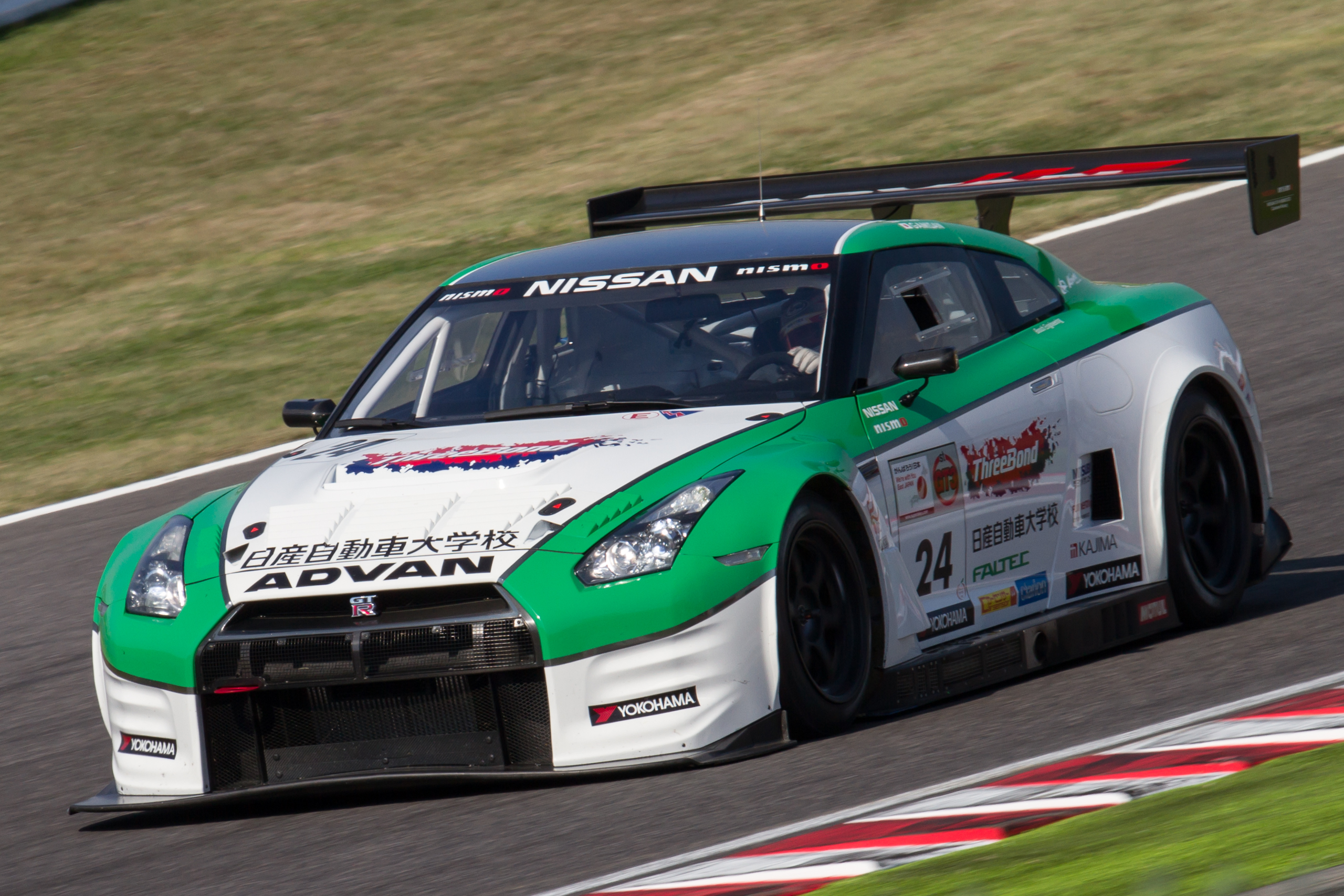
Threebond Nissan Technical College GT-R Nismo GT3

The GT-R Nismo GT3 is the most successful Group GT3 car in the Super Taikyu Series (also known as the Super Endurance Series), it has won 6 out of 12 full-season championships. It made its series debut in the second round of the 2012 season at Motegi, with team Threebond Nissan Technical College, qualifying 3rd on the grid, but returned to the pits after completing 5 laps in the race, as it was revealed that the race was a testing session to gather data for future competitive outings. The car scored its dominant first race win in the fourth round at Okayama, driven by Fuji, Gamisan and Chiyo, it crossed the finish line by over 21 seconds ahead of the 2nd-placed BMW Z4 GT3. 3 podium finishes were followed, including a double in the fifth round at Suzuka, and another in the final round at Autopolis. Starting from the back of the grid due to technical issues, it ultimately was able to finish on the podium. Although it was not a full season, the car was able to win a race and score 5 podium finishes.

In collaboration with Kondo Racing the team returned for the 2013 season, and additional GT-R Nismo GT3 race cars from team GTNET Advan and Mach GoGoGo Syaken were entered as well. Following the exceptional debut season, the car carried on its momentum to have another successful season. 10 podium finishes were followed from all three teams throughout the season, as well as 7 pole positions, it also won the final round at Autopolis to score a 1–2 finish. Including few double podium finishes, the car was 3rd in the final standings. Starting on in the 2014 season, it was a dominant era for the GT-R Nismo GT3 until the 2017 season. In 2014, except for team Mach Syaken, both teams returned to compete. Winning the opening round at Motegi, it went on to win 4 more races. The car also took 6 pole positions and 8 podium finishes, team GTNET ultimately won the championship with drivers Hoshino, Aoki, and Omoto. Both teams returned in 2015, with additional teams using the car include, Endless Sports and Team Mach. It was already a 1–2 finish in the opening round at Motegi, including several such dominant results, Endless Sports went on to win the championship with drivers, Yukinori Taniguchi, Kyosuke Mineo, and Yuya Motojima. Including the results of all five teams, the car finished the season with 5 race wins, 3 pole positions, and 11 podium finishes. 2016 season was the most dominant season for the car, it won every race of the season to finish 1–2–3 in the final standings. Although it won all 6 races consecutively, it also took 5 pole positions and 15 podium finishes as well. Kondo Racing won the championship, with drivers Fuji, Yudai Uchida, and Kazuki Hiramine.

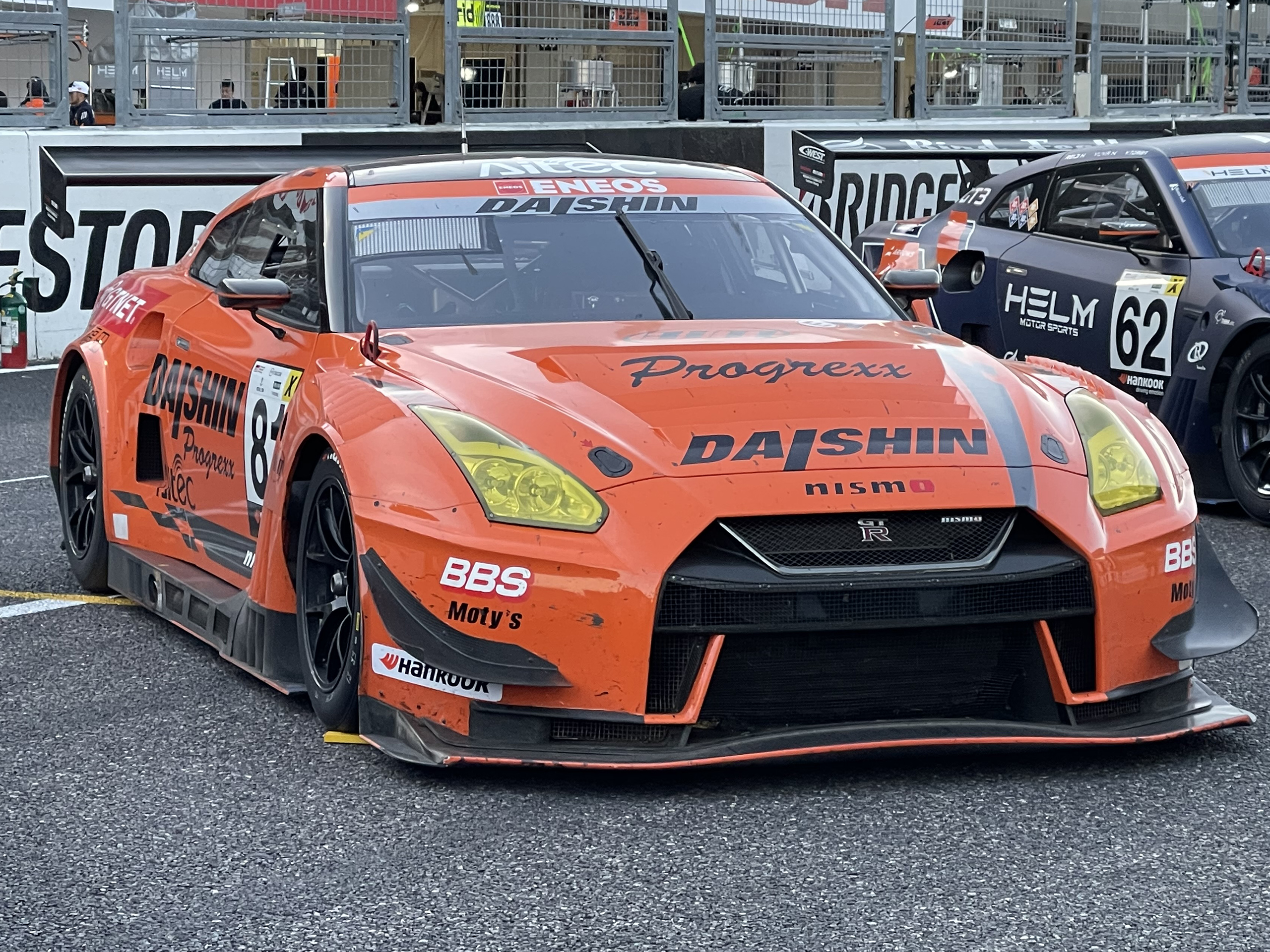
GTNET Motorsports won a record 3 championships with the GT-R Nismo GT3

All teams returned for the 2017 season, and it was the end of consecutive championship wins for the car. Defending champions, Kondo Racing ended up 2nd in the championship. The car scored 3 race wins and 10 podium finishes by the end of the season. It bounced back in 2018 with the updated 2018-spec, starting the season with a 1–2 finish in the opening round at Suzuka, it won 4 more races, took 3 pole positions and 10 podium finishes. Ultimately won the championship for GTNET, with drivers Hoshino, Teruhiko Hamano and Kiyoto Fujinami. Kondo Racing and Endless Sports finished 2nd and 3rd in final standings respectively. In 2019, reigning champions returned to defend their title, while Kondo Racing and Endless Sports were replaced by MP Racing and Tairoku Racing. Reigning champions already secured their title in the fourth race and withdrew the following race, held in Motegi. The car won 3 races, took 2 pole positions and 8 podium finishes during the season. In 2020, GTNET and MP Racing were the only teams that participated in with the car. In the opening round at Fuji, GTNET No.81 car scored a podium finish, as it finished the race in 3rd position. MP Racing were 2nd in the final standings, it was the first and so far only season that the car did not win a race since its debut in 2012. But scored 8 podium finishes to wrap up a winless season. Both teams returned for the 2021 season with upgraded GT-R Nismo GT3 Evo race cars, but were not in championship contention, as both teams did not participate in every race. GTNET won the Fuji 24 Hour race, and they were 4th in final standings. The car finished the season with a race win and 3 podium finishes.

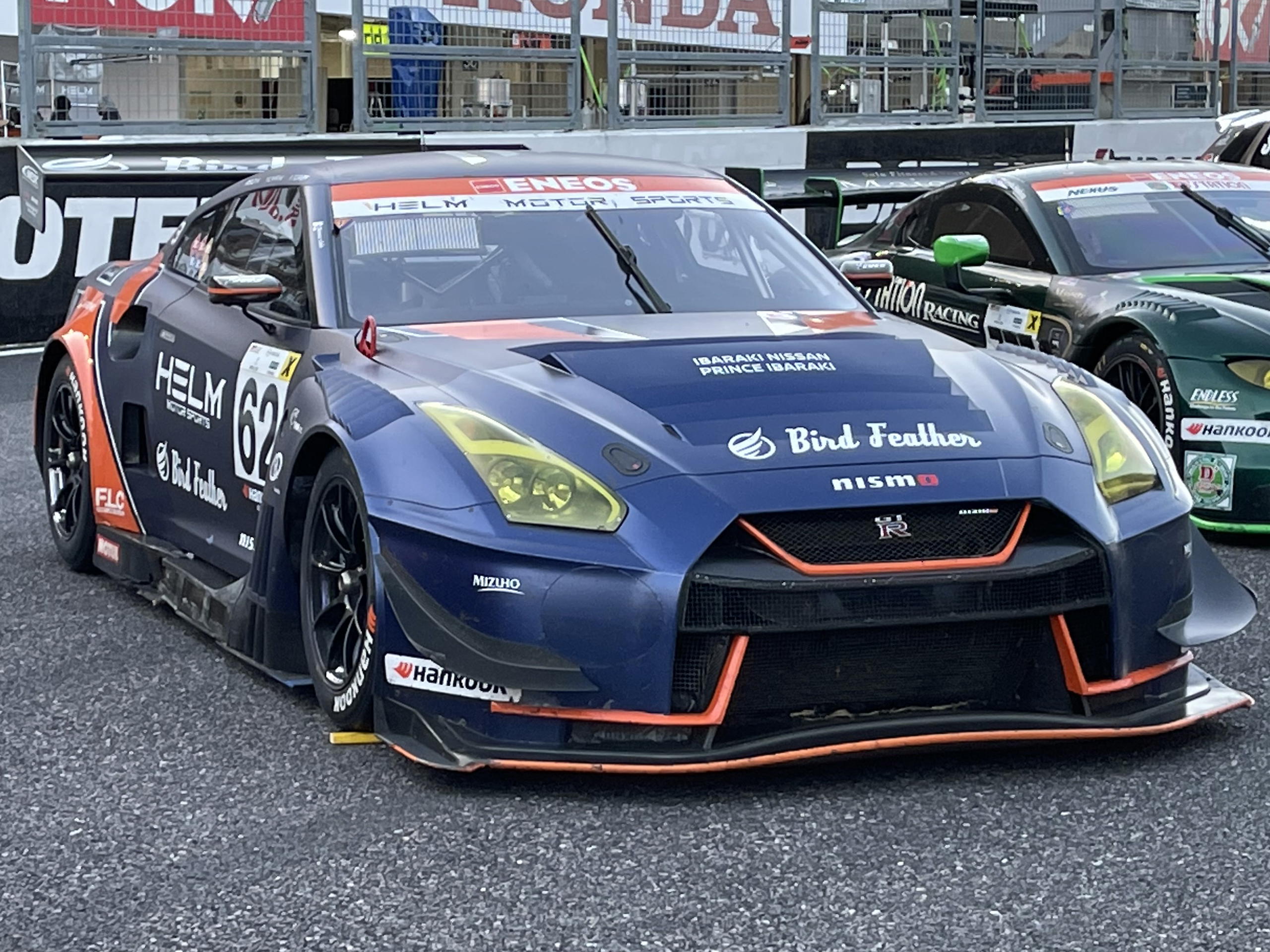
HELM Motorsports, 2022 championship winning GT-R Nismo GT3 Evo

For the 2022 season, both teams returned, and HELM Motorsports with an additional GT-R Nismo GT3 Evo participated as well. Also winning the Fuji 24 Hour race, HELM Motorsports were in championship contention with a Mercedes AMG GT3 Evo throughout the season. The team headed on to the championship decider with 2.5 points behind the AMG GT3 Evo, where the car finished 2nd ahead of the AMG GT3 Evo at 4th to win the championship by 7.5 points. It was driven by Yutaka Toba, Yuya Hiraki and Reiji Hiraki. The car won 3 races and scored 6 podium finishes during the season. Defending champions and GTNET Motorsports returned for the 2023 season. Team 5ZIGEN also raced in the opening round at Suzuka, and won the race starting from pole position and set the fastest lap. HELM Motorsports were again in championship contention with the same AMG GT3 Evo, head onto the final round of the season with 21.5 points behind. Despite finishing 2nd on the podium, it was not enough to win the championship as their rivals finished 3rd. Including 2 podium finishes from GTNET Motorsports, the car won a race, scored 3 pole positions, 6 podium finishes and end up 3rd in final standings. HELM Motorsports did not return in 2024, GTNET Motorsports however, finished a lowly 5th in standings with a race win, 2 pole positions, and 2 podium finishes. 2025 was the first season since 2012, where no team participated full-time in the series with a GT-R Nimso GT3. GTNET Motorsports entered the Fuji 24 hour round, and finished fifth. Same repeated in 2026, the car took pole position and finished second at the Fuji 24 hour, entered additional rounds in Autopolis and Okayama, finishing 3rd and 2nd respectively.

=== ADAC GT Masters ===
The GT-R Nismo GT3 made its ADAC GT Masters full-season debut in 2015, with team MRS GT-Racing. Although it was its debut season, it managed to finish in points in most of the races. But three race retirements and two race withdrawals resulted, 11th in the team's championship. In 2016, switching to the Junior class mid-season, it lost its potential of winning the Trophy class championship. End of the season, it was 4th in the Trophy class championship standings. In 2017, scoring multiple class wins and podium finishes, it eventually won the Trophy class championship with the reigning champion, Remo Lips. It was the last season for the car in the championship.

=== Endurance races ===
Bathurst 12 Hour

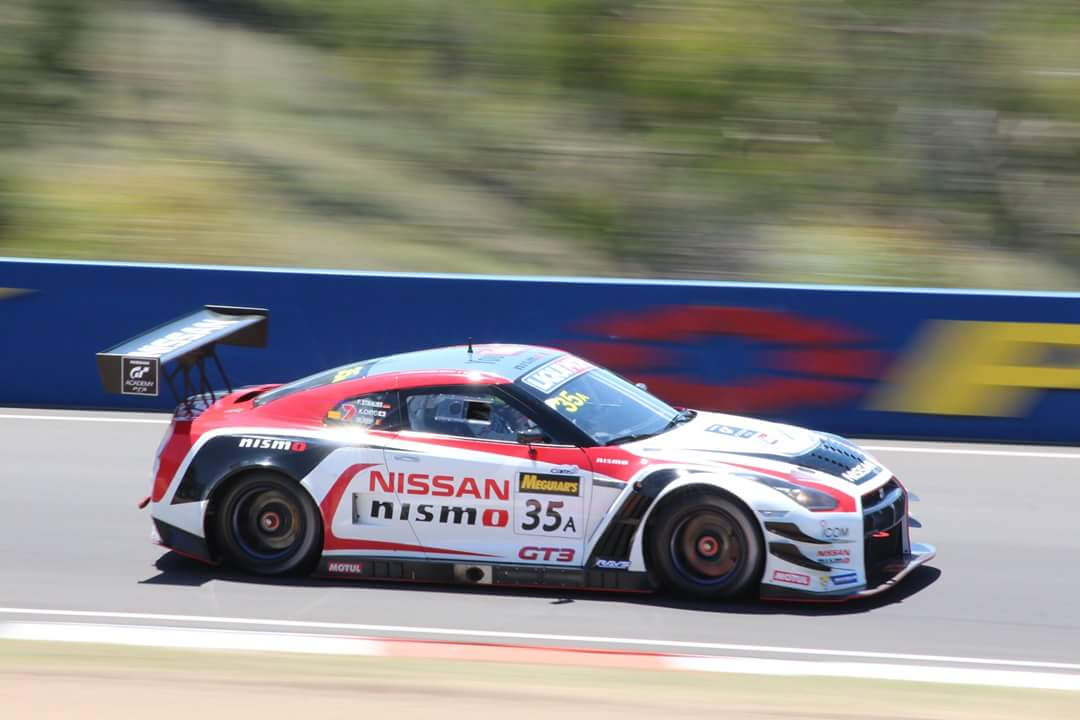
2015 Bathurst 12 hour race winning GT-R Nismo GT3

The Bathurst 12 Hour has been one of the most successful endurance races for the car. One of its predecessors, the Skyline GT-R R32 Group A originally earned its nickname "Godzilla" at this particular endurance race. The production version of the GT-R made its debut in 2012, with team Donut King Racing and drivers Tony Alfred, Adam Beechey and Peter Leemhuis, it won the C class and finished 6th overall. The GT-R Nismo GT3 made its debut in 2014, with Nismo Athlete Global Team. It qualified 5th but was involved in an incident while fighting for a podium finish, forced to retire from the race. The car bounced back in 2015, with drivers Strauss, Chiyo and Reip, it qualified 3rd and won the race after an intensive battle up front in the final 20 minutes of the race. It charged itself from 3rd to 1st on the penultimate lap. In 2016, although the car qualified in a disappointing 13th position, it finished 2nd in the race behind the race-winning McLaren 650S GT3 of Tekno Autosports. The car closed a 14-second gap deficit to 1.2 seconds during the final stages, led the most laps of 107 out of the 297 laps and set a record fastest lap during the race as well.

The team did not return in 2017, instead Nissan Motorsport and Wall Racing participated using four GT-R Nismo GT3 race cars. Nissan Motorsport led the race at some stages, but due to a gearbox issue, the car was forced to pit and rejoined 10th, and managed to finish the race 4th in class and 8th overall. The sister car was retired from the race due to technical errors, but was classified as 8th in class and 32nd overall. Both Wall Racing cars were retired from the race. The car did not race in 2018. But in 2019 with team KCMG, due to the race being part of the Intercontinental GT Challenge. The car finished the race in 7th position. The team returned for the 2020 race as well, qualified 4th and finished 9th in class, and 12th overall. Another GT-R Nismo GT3 of Hobson Motorsport qualified 6th and finished the race 5th in its class.

Dubai 24 Hour

The GT-R Nismo GT3 made its Dubai 24 Hour debut in 2012, finished the race 22nd in A6 class. The car did not participate in 2013 and 2014. But in 2015, with Nissan GT Academy Team RJN and drivers, Strauss, Ricardo Sanchez, Ahmed Bin Khanen, Nick Hammann, and Gaetan Paletou, the car qualified on pole in Pro-Am class. Although it served a couple of drive-through penalties, it finished 2nd to score a podium finish in its class, and 5th overall. In 2016, a customer team, MRS GT-Racing participated in Pro class. They finished the race 11th in Pro class, starting from 10th on the grid. Following a two-year hiatus in 2017 and 2018, the car returned for the 2019 race. KCMG with two cars, qualified 10th and 12th, and finished the race 8th in Pro class while the sister car retired from the race, due to an incident during the race.

Nürburgring 24 Hours

The car made its Nürburgring 24 Hours debut in 2013, with a customer team Schulze Motorsport, it qualified 26th overall. During the race, due to technical issues, the team was forced to replace its engine but rejoined and finished 134th overall. In 2014, they finished 11th in SP9 GT3 class. Nissan GT Academy Team RJN with two cars, finished 13th in the SP9 class while the other car was retired from the race, due to making contact with a barrier. In 2015, the car's best result was a 9th-place finish, starting from 31st on the grid.

GT Academy returned for the 2016 race, qualified 25th, and climbed up positions to finish 11th overall. After two years of absence in 2017 and 2018, the car returned to the race in 2019. Kondo Racing with a 2018-spec GT-R Nismo GT3, qualified in 25th overall, and finished 8th in the SP9 class and 9th overall during the race. KCMG were retired from the race, due to incidents and reliability concerns. Apart from these Nürburgring 24 Hours races, the car has won races and scored podium finishes in the Nürburgring Endurance Series as well.

Suzuka 1000 km

As it has taken place in the Super GT series calendar, both GT-R Nismo GT500 and GT-R Nismo GT3 have raced in the Suzuka 1000 km (also known as the Suzuka 10 Hours). The GT-R Nismo GT500 was the most successful, as it had a 100 percent podium rate in this particular endurance race. It made its debut in 2008, won the race with team Impul and drivers, Tsugio Matsuda and Sébastien Philippe. In 2009 and 2010, it scored 2 podium finishes and the fastest lap in 2010 as well. In 2011, Hasemi Motorsport drivers, Quintarelli and Yanagida took overall pole position, finished 2nd with the fastest lap of the race, while team Impul finished 3rd to make it a double-podium finish. In 2012, Quintarelli and Yanagida dominated the whole race weekend to win the race starting from pole position, as well as to set the fastest lap. Kondo Racing finished 3rd to make it two consecutive double-podium finishes for the car. The GT-R Nismo GT3 made its debut and went on to score a podium finish in the GT300 class.

In 2013, the GT-R Nismo GT500 finished 2nd, starting from pole position, and took over the Super GT championship lead. Following another podium finish in 2014, Nismo drivers, Quintarelli and Matsuda took pole position and finished 7th, while team Impul finished on the podium in 2015. Gainer Tanax GT-R Nismo GT3 with drivers, Couto, Chiyo, and Ryuichiro Tomita won the GT300 class, starting from 2nd on the grid. The team scored a GT300 class podium finish in the 2016 race as well, while team Mola GT-R Nismo GT500 also finished on the podium. Team Forum Engineering Advan set the fastest lap of the race. 2017 was the last Suzuka 1000 km race for the GT-R Nismo GT500. Kondo Racing car with drivers, Sasaki and Oliveira took pole position and finished 5th with the fastest lap of the race as well. Team Nismo finished 2nd to score a podium finish.

Since 2018, Suzuka 1000 km no longer took part in the Super GT series, but in the Intercontinental GT Challenge. In 2018, KCMG GT-R Nismo GT3 qualified 4th on the grid but retired during the race. Team Gainer qualified 10th and finished 14th. In 2019, KCMG qualified in a disappointing 13th place, but made enough positions to finish 6th in the race. MP Racing scored a podium finish in Am class. The race was not held until 2025 due to the COVID-19 pandemic and other concerns. However, it was held in 2025, with Team Handwork Challenge (No. 30), Team 5ZIGEN (No. 500), and RunUp Sports (No. 360) each entering a GT-R Nismo GT3 Evo, under the Pro, Silver, and Am classes, respectively. In a qualifying session disrupted by multiple red flags, the No. 500 car secured 2nd in class and 7th overall, but was unable to improve its time following the final red flag. The No. 30 car qualified 7th in class and 12th overall, but dropped back to 21st for speeding under red flags. The No. 360 car took 2nd in class and 31st overall. In the race, the No. 500 car claimed victory in the Silver class and secured 15th place overall. Meanwhile, the No. 360 car—having accumulated the highest mileage after completing every on-track session in both the 1000km and Japan Cup series—won the Am class and finished 25th overall. The No. 30 car, after making strong progress and closing in onto top-ten positions, was forced to retire due to a mechanical failure. In 2026, Team Daishin replaced Team Handwork Challenge with the car No. 81 to participate under the Bronze class, whilst Team 5ZIGEN switched to the Pro class. Car No. 500 started 5th on the grid but was forced to pit twice for suspension repairs early in the race. Rejoining 29th and four laps down, it recovered to finish 8th in class and 19th overall. Car No. 81 finished 7th in class and 16th overall. Car No. 360 suffered a heavy collision during pre-qualifying, forcing the team to rebuild the car around a spare chassis and start from the pit lane. Whilst struggling for pace with the rebuilt car, the team finished the race to win the sole-entry Am class.

Macau Grand Prix

The GT-R Nismo GT3 made its Macau Grand Prix (known as the FIA GT World Cup at the time) debut in 2018, with KCMG in both Platinum and Gold classes. Although it was the debut year, the car was proved to be successful in the race. It qualified 3rd in the Gold class and held onto that position during the qualifying race. The other cars qualified 9th and 10th in the Platinum class and climbed up to finish 8th, while the other car was forced to retire from the race due to an engine issue. In the main race, the car again maintained 3rd position to score a podium finish in the Gold class, while the other cars finished 8th and 9th in the Platinum class.

== Other categories ==
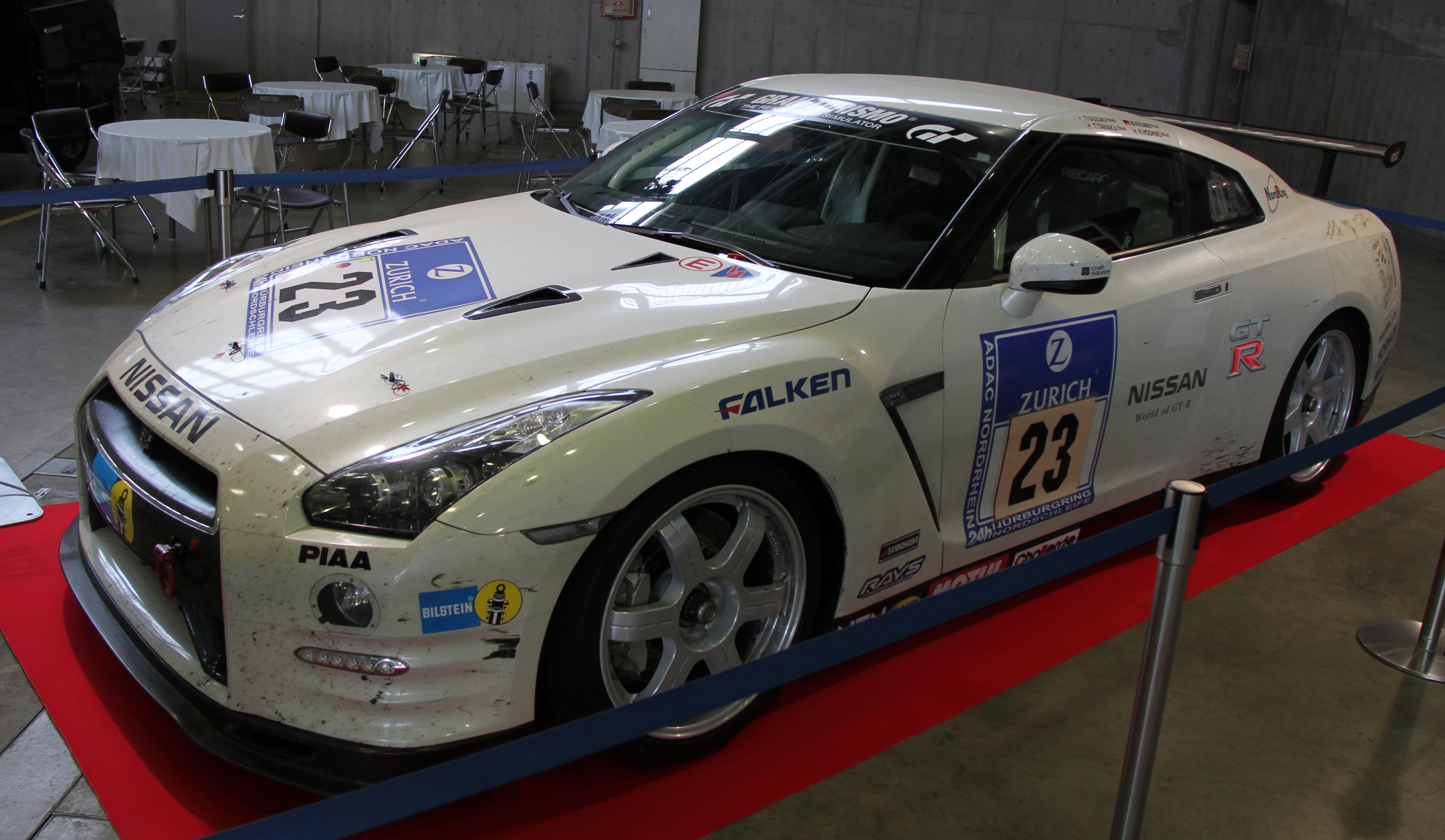

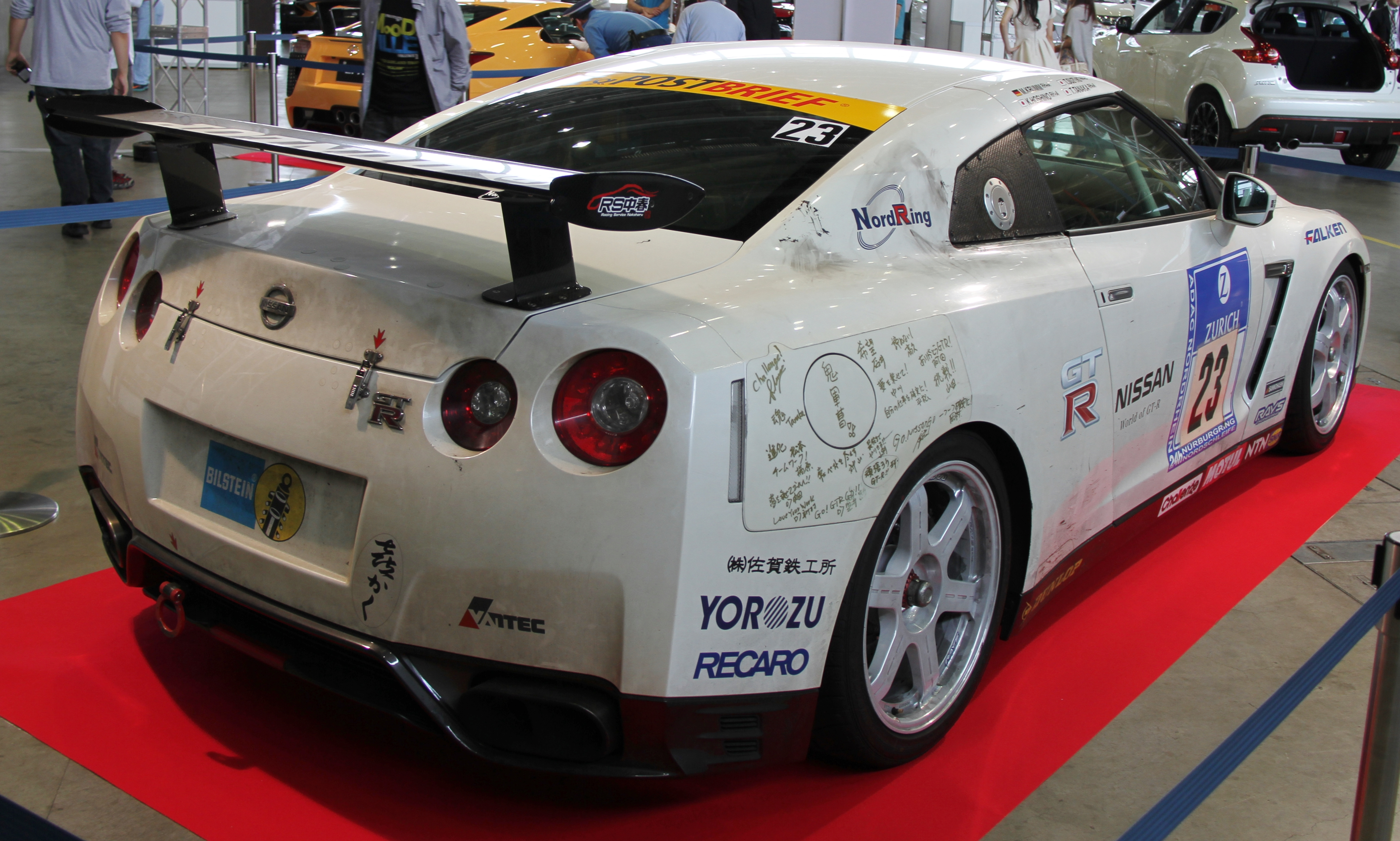
GT-R Club Track Edition

A production-based GT-R made its world motorsport debut in Australia's Targa Tasmania tarmac rally in April 2008, however it sustained damage early in the event and did not complete the rally. Later in 2008, the car won the Competition Modern class in the Targa West, before returning to Targa Tasmania in 2009 to take the outright win in the Modern class. In 2009, it won the One Lap of America competition. In 2010, the car finished 2nd overall in the One Lap of America competition. During the 2010 SCCA World Challenge season, a pair of GT class cars were campaigned by Brass Monkey Racing and driven by Steve Ott and Tony Rivera.

On June 4, 2010, Nismo introduced the GT-R Club Track Edition, which was available via the Nismo Omori aftermarket factory. This domestic market trim was a non-street legal, race-ready variant equipped with a 6-point roll cage and upgraded with the Nismo race package developed through its Tokachi endurance racer program. On June 25 and 26, 2011, the No.71 Schulze Motorsport GT-R Club Track Edition took part in the 2011 24 Hours of Nürburgring. Driven by Michael Schulze, Tobias Schulze, Kazunori Yamauchi and Yasuyoshi Yamamoto, it finished the race 36th overall, achieving a victory in the SP8T class after overcoming several technical problems. It was the first time a GT-R (R35) took part in the 24 Hours of Nürburgring. In 2012, Nissan as a works team, participated in the SP8T class with two Club Track Edition race cars. Team Nissan and GT Academy, both teams made it a 1–2 finish in class, 30th and 99th overall.

== Aftermarket tuning ==
=== Tuning ===
Succeeding the Skyline GT-R, the GT-R is also well recognized for its tuning capabilities among enthusiasts. It has set numerous speed records and victories in drag racing, time attacks, hill climbing, drifting among others. Despite early concerns about the difficulty of modifying the GT-R, many aftermarket tuning parts have become available throughout the years. Previously reported "untunable" ECU has since been hacked by several tuning houses. COBB Tuning was the first company to access its encrypted ECU. Japan based tuner, Mine's has limited control of the ECU as well, and others in the likes of MCR, HKS, and Top Secret have bypassed the unit. They have been seen testing modified variations of the car, with the former two having conducted tests at the Tsukuba Circuit.

Ecutek tuning, were the first company to manipulate and change its automatic mode shift points in the transmission control module (TCM), which could be done at the will of the driver. Ecutek also offered a system that could adjust its launch control on the fly, available with a wrap-around boost gauge that can read over 20 psi. COBB Tuning and Ecutek offered engine tuning on the ECU and TCM with different launch control software from LC1 up to LC5. On January 16, 2013, Ecutek also became the first company to construct and offer Flex Fuel hardware and software capability for all models. The fuel kit was required the Ecutek specific TCM as well. It provided changes in the cold start cranking compensation, maximum target boost, ignition timing, target airflow, cam timing and in the fuel economy gauge reading all based solely on ethanol content in the gas tank.

Mine's upgraded the high potential VR38DETT engine, using lightened engine internals such as titanium rods, lightened pistons and many other components that allow the engine to rev quickly, as well as to produce power more than 588 kW; 789 hp; 800 PS. AMS Performance and Extreme Turbo Systems were the major turner companies for building drag cars and aftermarket tuner parts for the GT-R in North America.

Motor Trend editor Scott Kanemura, revealed that the GPS system fitted to the GT-R would remove the 180 km/h (112 mph) speed limiter when it arrives to a race track, but only on tracks approved by Nissan. Aftermarket ECUs have been developed to bypass that speed limiter, in addition to stand-alone speed-limiter defeaters. The GPS check will not be implemented in American models. Nismo themselves have offered various tuning packages for the car, the "Club Sports" tuning package, which contained the upgraded parts of the GT-R SpecV, among others. Including the Nürburgring Nordschleife record setting N-Attack Package, Clubman Race Spec (CRS), Sports Resetting and Version Up sets which offered facelifted upgrades for pre-facelifted models.

=== Drag racing ===
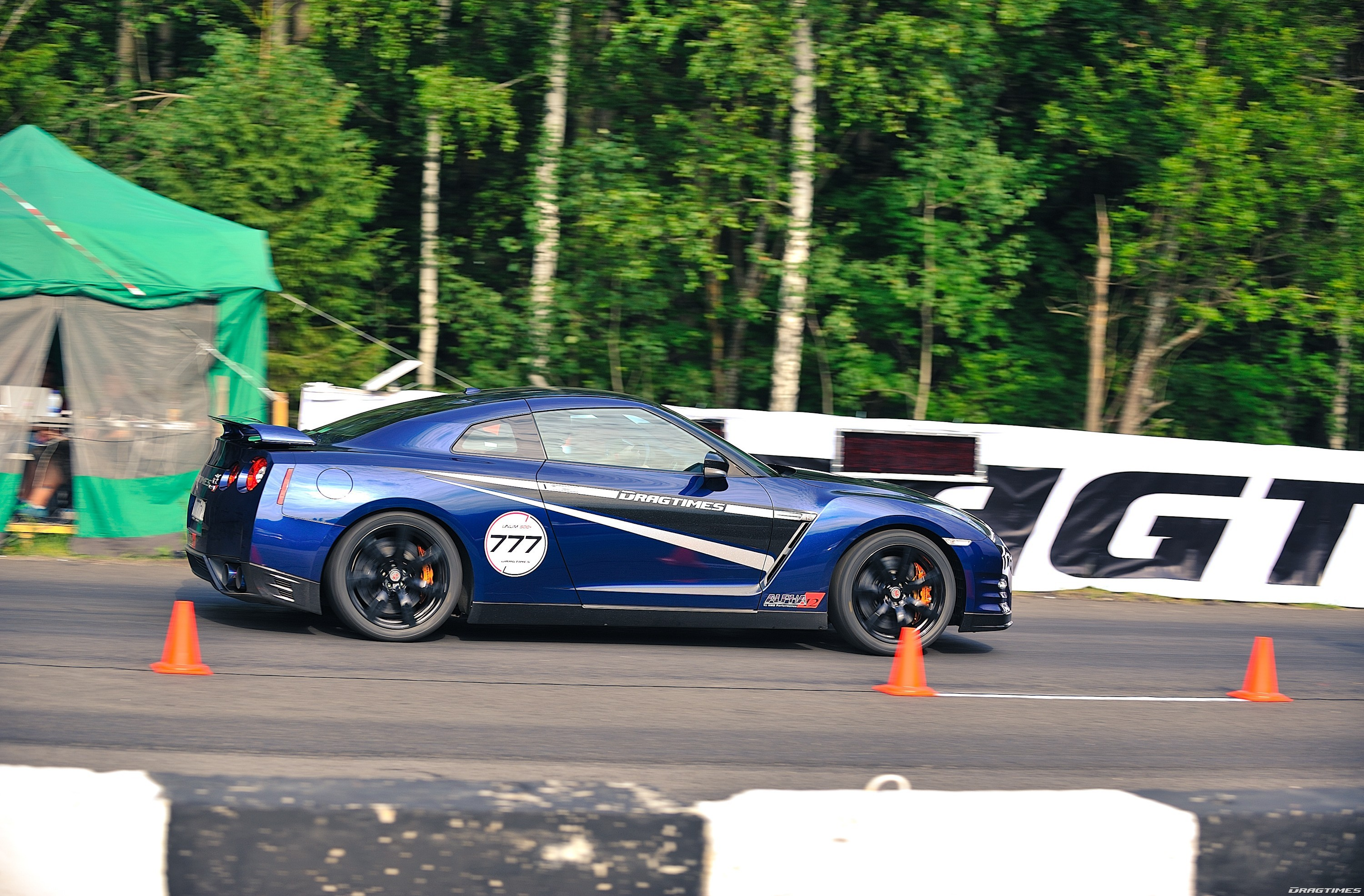

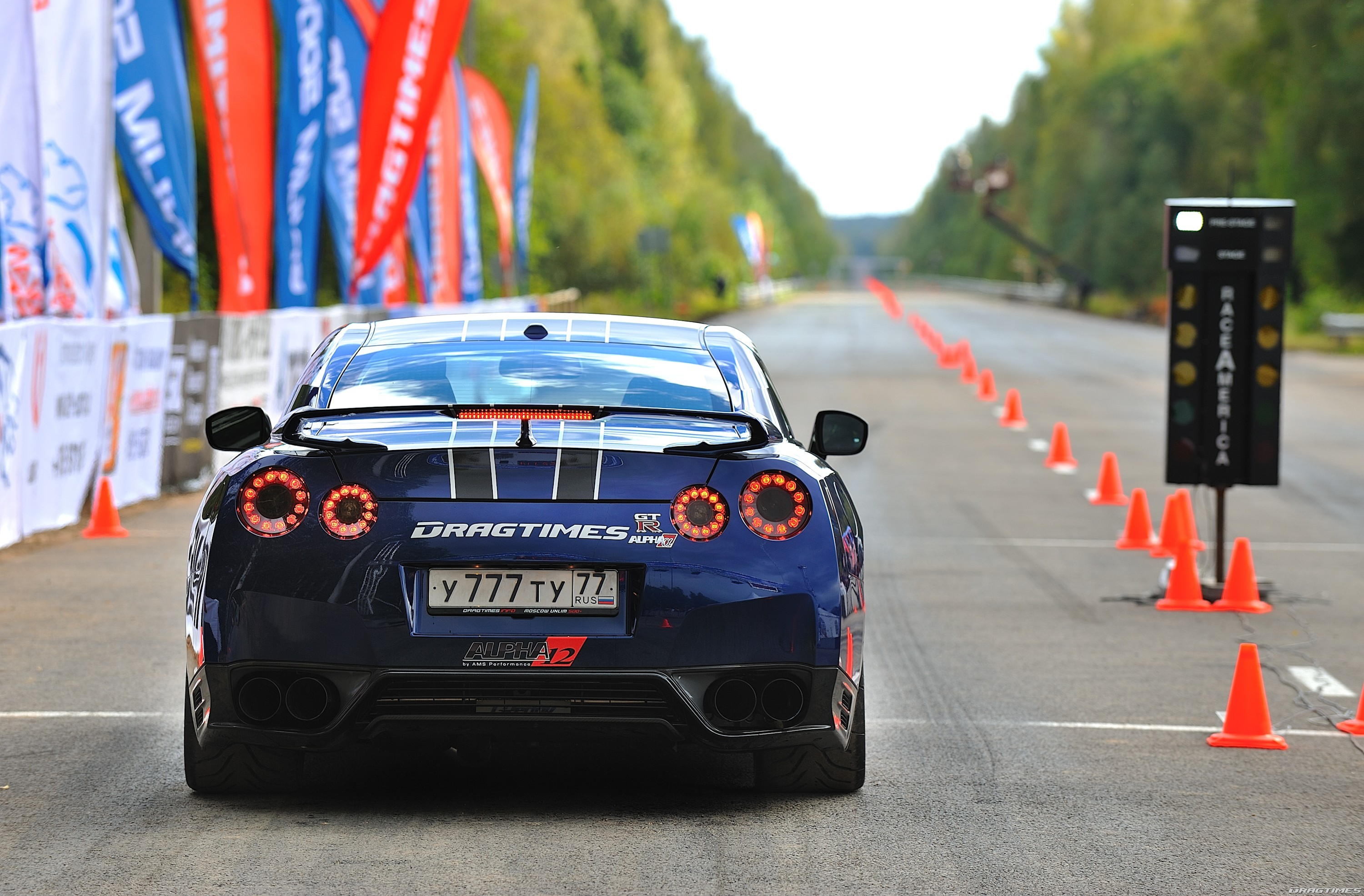
Fastest road-legal 1 mile record holder, GT-R AMS Alpha 12+

AMS Performance, based in West Chicago, Illinois, are well known for the car's drag racing success, having set record power levels and performance numbers, they became the first tuner house to reach 9, 8, 7 and 6 second quarter mile runs. In June 2013, the Alpha Omega GT-R broke into the 7 seconds, ran a 7.98 second quarter mile at 299.56 km/h (186.14 mph). Later during the same day, it also broke couple of other records as well. It bested its previous 97–209 km/h (60–130 mph) time with 2.67 seconds, broke the 161–241 km/h (100–150 mph) record of 2.58 seconds, held by an Underground Racing TT Lamborghini Gallardo with 2.45 seconds. In June 2015, the car was generating over 1,529 kW; 2,050 hp; 2,078 PS and could accelerate from 0–60 mph in 1.49 seconds. It set multiple world records at the WannaGoFast 1/2 Mile Shootout. Including a trap speed of 361.8 km/h (224.91 mph) from a standing 1/2 mile, from 97 to 209 km/h (60–130 mph) in 2.28 seconds, 0–161 km/h (0–100 mph) in 2.78 seconds, 0–300 km/h (0–186 mph) in 7.07 seconds and 0–322 km/h (0–200 mph) in 10.49 seconds. Its best quarter-mile time was 7.49 seconds at 310 km/h (193 mph), making it the quickest and fastest road-legal vehicle at the time. It also won the King of The Streets competition two times in a row. Its AMS Performance Alpha Omega package was a research and development project and was not available for customers. But the Alpha 6, 9, 10, 12, 14, 16, and X packages were available; with each respectively producing approximately 447 kW; 600 hp; 608 PS, 669 kW; 898 hp; 910 PS, 746 kW; 1,000 hp; 1,014 PS, 895 kW; 1,200 hp; 1,217 PS, 1,044 kW; 1,400 hp; 1,419 PS, 1,193 kW; 1,600 hp; 1,622 PS, 1,641 kW; 2,200 hp; 2,231 PS when installed and tuned.

In 2017, AMS Performance built the Alpha-G GT-R, it was the first to run a quarter-mile in 6 seconds, completed a quarter mile run in 6.937 seconds. Driven by Gidi Chamdi with a trap speed of 315.36 km/h (196 mph), it held the fastest all-wheel-drive vehicle record. Later, ETS (Extreme Turbo Systems) with their car, broke the record with a 6.88 seconds in a quarter-mile run at 358.80 km/h (223 mph), also setting the record for fastest standing half-mile with a trap speed of 410.29 km/h (255 mph). In December 2018, Alpha Logic Performance from Dubai set the quarter-mile record for fastest all-wheel-drive vehicle, using the "Panda" GT-R. It ran a quarter mile distance in 6.582 seconds at 373.82 km/h (232.28 mph). In 2019 Import vs Domestic finals, the 2,610 kW; 3,500 hp; 3,549 PS and 100 psi of boost, ETS-G GT-R again broke the fastest all-wheel-drive and stock unibody world record, as it completed a quarter mile run in 6.56 seconds with a trap speed of 362.02 km/h (225 mph), winning the competition by beating the AMS Performance's Alpha Queen GT-R, which ran a 6.87 second quarter mile. T1 Race's Nightfury GT-R set the record for fastest stock location turbo GT-R as well as the fastest and quickest GT-R record, completing a quarter mile distance in 6.51 seconds with a trap speed of 370 km/h (230 mph).

In the Dragtimes competition in Russia, AMS Alpha 12 GT-R set the fastest road-legal standing 1 mile record, driven by Jury with a trap speed of 382 km/h (237 mph). Later in the same competition, Switzer Goliath GT-R broke the record in 22.602 seconds at a trap speed of 402 km/h (250 mph).

=== Time attack ===
Modified variations of the GT-R have participated in several time attack challenges, especially in the World Time Attack Challenge (WTAC), with teams HKS, Precision Automotive Racing and LYFE. In 2015, HKS built the fastest time attack GT-R, it had the same VR38DETT engine with generating over 883 kW; 1,184 hp; 1,200 PS. It became fastest at Fontana, California, Fuji Speedway (achieving a peak speed of over 322 km/h (200 mph) in the main start/finish straight) and also in Sydney Motorsport Park. It participated in the 2015 WTAC and won the GT-R R35 class with the fastest lap time of 1:30.838 minutes. In 2017, LYFE's 847 kW; 1,136 hp; 1,152 PS GT-R broke all the records of HKS and won the WTAC. The GT-R of Precision Automotive Racing, driven by Aaron McGranahan, set a peak speed of 269 km/h (167 mph) and won the Flying 500 class title. The team did not return for the 2018 season. But in 2019, finished 5th in Pro class championship standings. The car also won the Super Lap Battle USA, setting a lap time of 2:07.18 minutes around the Circuit of the Americas. It also claimed to be the fastest time attack automobile in North America.

=== Hill climb ===
The GT-R have participated in many hill climb competitions in both stock and modified forms, notably in the Jaguar Simola Hill Climb in South Africa. In the 2019 season, the factory standard GT-R was named "the most successful supercar", winning the final Top 10 Shootout event. Kyle Mitchell driving, it set a time of 40.862 seconds to become the fastest road-legal vehicle.

=== Drifting ===
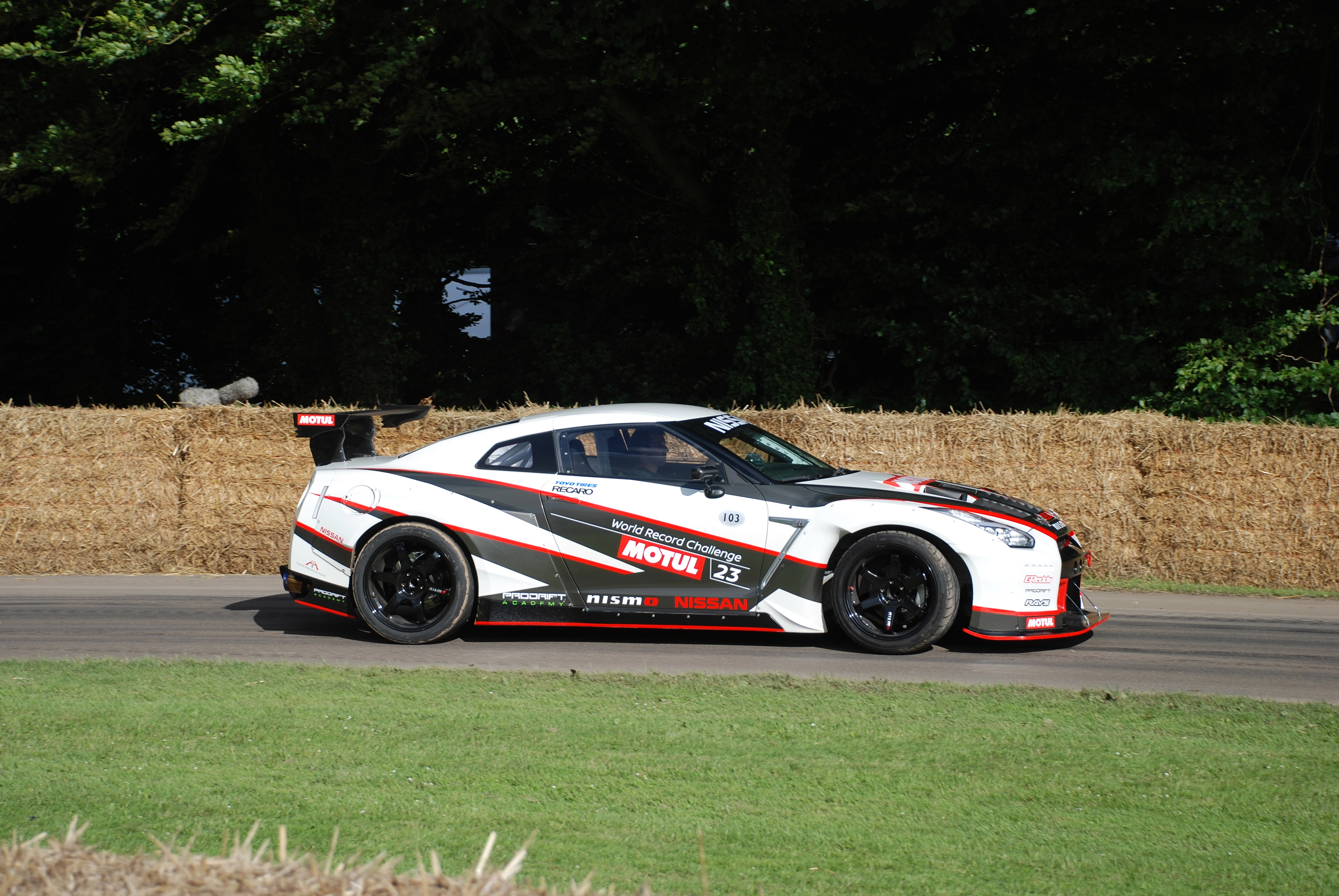
GT-R Nismo Fastest Drift record car at the Goodwood Festival of Speed

The driver of the GT-R Nismo fastest drift world record, Masato Kawabata won the 2015 D1 Grand Prix with the modified Toyo Tires Drift Trust Racing GT-R. Darren Kelly with team The Heart of Racing won the Pro-series championships of 2019 and 2021 D1NZ Drifting Championship seasons.

In 2016, a heavily modified GT-R Nismo set the Guinness World Record for the Fastest Drift, with a trap speed of 304.96 km/h at a 30-degree angle drift. It was driven by Kawabata at the Fujairah International Airport. Three attempts were undertaken by the team of Nissan Middle East, to set the record.

=== Others ===
On August 13, 2014, Mike Newman set a Guinness world record for the "Fastest speed for a car driven blindfolded", in a GT-R modified by Litchfield Motors from the United Kingdom.
