= 2010 FIA GT1 Spa-Francorchamps round =

Auto racing event

Layout of the Circuit de Spa-Francorchamps

The 2010 FIA GT1 Spa-Francorchamps round was an auto racing event held at the Circuit de Spa-Francorchamps, Francorchamps, Belgium on 29–31 July. The Spa event was the fifth round of the 2010 FIA GT1 World Championship season. The FIA GT1 round was not the feature race of the weekend as it was a support series for the Spa 24 Hours along with the Cooper Tires British F3, and the Lamborghini Blancpain Super Trofeo.

== Qualifying ==
Mad-Croc Racing Corvette drivers Xavier Maassen and Jos Menten earned pole position in qualifying by setting a lap time 0.2 seconds faster than any other competitor in the third qualifying session.

=== Qualifying result ===
For qualifying, Driver 1 participates in the first and third sessions while Driver 2 participates in only the second session. The fastest lap for each session is indicated with bold.

Pos	No.	Driver 1	Team	Session 1	Session 2	Session 3	Grid
Pos	No.	Driver 2	Team	Session 1	Session 2	Session 3	Grid
1	11	(Netherlands) Xavier Maassen	(Belgium) Mad-Croc Racing	2:18.194	2:18.685	2:17.605	1
1	11	(Netherlands) Jos Menten	(Belgium) Mad-Croc Racing	2:18.194	2:18.685	2:17.605	1
2	38	(Netherlands) Nicky Pastorelli	(Germany) All-Inkl.com Münnich Motorsport	2:18.654	2:19.350	2:17.812	2
2	38	(Germany) Dominik Schwager	(Germany) All-Inkl.com Münnich Motorsport	2:18.654	2:19.350	2:17.812	2
3	25	(Brazil) Ricardo Zonta	(Germany) Reiter	2:18.816	2:18.380	2:18.082	3
3	25	(Germany) Frank Kechele	(Germany) Reiter	2:18.816	2:18.380	2:18.082	3
4	34	(Belgium) Bert Longin	(Germany) Triple H Team Hegersport	2:18.511	2:19.454	2:18.322	4
4	34	(Belgium) Nico Verdonck	(Germany) Triple H Team Hegersport	2:18.511	2:19.454	2:18.322	4
5	13	(Netherlands) Mike Hezemans	(Germany) Phoenix Racing / Carsport	2:19.495	2:19.454	2:18.373	5
5	13	(Germany) Marc Hennerici	(Germany) Phoenix Racing / Carsport	2:19.495	2:19.454	2:18.373	5
6	40	(Belgium) Maxime Martin	(Belgium) Marc VDS Racing Team	2:19.500	2:19.592	2:18.471	6
6	40	(Belgium) Bas Leinders	(Belgium) Marc VDS Racing Team	2:19.500	2:19.592	2:18.471	6
7	10	(Switzerland) Jonathan Hirschi	(France) Hexis AMR	2:19.388	2:19.169	2:19.062	7
7	10	(Monaco) Clivio Piccione	(France) Hexis AMR	2:19.388	2:19.169	2:19.062	7
8	8	(Denmark) Christoffer Nygaard	(Germany) Young Driver AMR	2:19.407	2:19.163	2:19.755	8
8	8	(Germany) Stefan Mücke	(Germany) Young Driver AMR	2:19.407	2:19.163	2:19.755	8
9	24	(Netherlands) Peter Kox	(Germany) Reiter	2:18.820	2:19.626		9
9	24	(Germany) Christopher Haase	(Germany) Reiter	2:18.820	2:19.626		9
10	2	(Brazil) Enrique Bernoldi	(Germany) Vitaphone Racing Team	2:18.356	2:19.630		10
10	2	(Portugal) Miguel Ramos	(Germany) Vitaphone Racing Team	2:18.356	2:19.630		10
11	6	(Switzerland) Romain Grosjean	(Switzerland) Matech Competition	2:19.158	2:19.762		11
11	6	(Switzerland) Neel Jani	(Switzerland) Matech Competition	2:19.158	2:19.762		11
12	9	(France) Frédéric Makowiecki	(France) Hexis AMR	2:17.865	2:19.883		12
12	9	(France) Thomas Accary	(France) Hexis AMR	2:17.865	2:19.883		12
13	5	(United Kingdom) Richard Westbrook	(Switzerland) Matech Competition	2:19.662	2:20.048		13
13	5	(Brazil) Rafael Daniel	(Switzerland) Matech Competition	2:19.662	2:20.048		13
14	14	(Italy) Andrea Piccini	(Germany) Phoenix Racing / Carsport	2:19.079	2:21.387		14
14	14	(Belgium) Anthony Kumpen	(Germany) Phoenix Racing / Carsport	2:19.079	2:21.387		14
15	4	(Japan) Seiji Ara	(Switzerland) Swiss Racing Team	2:19.399	2:21.575		15
15	4	(Sweden) Max Nilsson	(Switzerland) Swiss Racing Team	2:19.399	2:21.575		15
16	12	(United Kingdom) Oliver Gavin	(Switzerland) Mad-Croc Racing	2:19.225	2:22.808		16
16	12	(Finland) Pertti Kuismanen	(Switzerland) Mad-Croc Racing	2:19.225	2:22.808		16
17	37	(Germany) Marc Basseng	(Germany) All-Inkl.com Münnich Motorsport	2:19.663			17
17	37	(France) Christophe Bouchut	(Germany) All-Inkl.com Münnich Motorsport	2:19.663			17
18	7	(Czech Republic) Tomáš Enge	(Germany) Young Driver AMR	2:19.680			18
18	7	(United Kingdom) Darren Turner	(Germany) Young Driver AMR	2:19.680			18
19	23	(Germany) Michael Krumm	(United Kingdom) Sumo Power GT	2:19.720			19
19	23	(United Kingdom) Peter Dumbreck	(United Kingdom) Sumo Power GT	2:19.720			19
20	22	(United Kingdom) Warren Hughes	(United Kingdom) Sumo Power GT	2:19.745			20
20	22	(United Kingdom) Jamie Campbell-Walter	(United Kingdom) Sumo Power GT	2:19.745			20
21	1	(Italy) Andrea Bertolini	(Germany) Vitaphone Racing Team	2:19.753			21
21	1	(Germany) Michael Bartels	(Germany) Vitaphone Racing Team	2:19.753			21
22	3	(Austria) Karl Wendlinger	(Switzerland) Swiss Racing Team	2:20.170			22
22	3	(Switzerland) Henri Moser	(Switzerland) Swiss Racing Team	2:20.170			22
23	41	(Finland) Markus Palttala	(Belgium) Marc VDS Racing Team	2:20.490			23
23	41	(Belgium) Renaud Kuppens	(Belgium) Marc VDS Racing Team	2:20.490			23
24	33	(Germany) Altfrid Heger	(Belgium) Triple H Team Hegersport	2:20.939			24
24	33	(Germany) Alex Müller	(Belgium) Triple H Team Hegersport	2:20.939			24

== Races ==
=== Qualifying race ===
==== Race result ====
Pos	No.	Team	Drivers	Manufacturer	Laps	Time/Retired
1	11	(Belgium) Mad-Croc Racing	(Netherlands) Xavier Maassen (Netherlands) Jos Menten	Corvette	25	
2	25	(Germany) Reiter	(Brazil) Ricardo Zonta (Germany) Frank Kechele	Lamborghini	25	−1.895
3	8	(Germany) Young Driver AMR	(Denmark) Christoffer Nygaard (Germany) Stefan Mücke	Aston Martin	25	−27.771
4	34	(Germany) Triple H Team Hegersport	(Belgium) Bert Longin (Belgium) Nico Verdonck	Maserati	25	−35.518
5	38	(Germany) All-Inkl.com Münnich Motorsport	(Netherlands) Nicky Pastorelli (Germany) Dominik Schwager	Lamborghini	25	−36.972
6	5	(Switzerland) Matech Competition	(United Kingdom) Richard Westbrook (Germany) Thomas Mutsch	Ford	25	−41.228
7	24	(Germany) Reiter	(Netherlands) Peter Kox (Germany) Christopher Haase	Lamborghini	25	−50.582
8	23	(United Kingdom) Sumo Power GT	(Germany) Michael Krumm (United Kingdom) Peter Dumbreck	Nissan	25	−51.892
9	40	(Belgium) Marc VDS Racing Team	(Belgium) Maxime Martin (Belgium) Bas Leinders	Ford	25	−52.956
10	7	(Germany) Young Driver AMR	(Czech Republic) Tomáš Enge (United Kingdom) Darren Turner	Aston Martin	25	−53.016
11	2	(Germany) Vitaphone Racing Team	(Brazil) Enrique Bernoldi (Portugal) Miguel Ramos	Maserati	25	−56.667
12	33	(Germany) Triple H Team Hegersport	(Germany) Altfrid Heger (Germany) Alex Müller	Maserati	25	−1:07.903
13	10	(France) Hexis AMR	(Switzerland) Jonathan Hirschi (Monaco) Clivio Piccione	Aston Martin	25	−1:08.547
14	41	(Belgium) Marc VDS Racing Team	(Finland) Markus Palttala (Belgium) Renaud Kuppens	Ford	25	−1:11.571
15	37	(Germany) All-Inkl.com Münnich Motorsport	(Germany) Marc Basseng (France) Christophe Bouchut	Lamborghini	25	−1:13.693
16	3	(Switzerland) Swiss Racing Team	(Austria) Karl Wendlinger (Switzerland) Henri Moser	Nissan	25	−1:26.151
17	4	(Switzerland) Swiss Racing Team	(Japan) Seiji Ara (Sweden) Max Nilsson	Nissan	25	−1:26.601
18	12	(Belgium) Mad-Croc Racing	(United Kingdom) Oliver Gavin (Finland) Pertti Kuismanen	Corvette	25	−1:29.182
19	22	(United Kingdom) Sumo Power GT	(United Kingdom) Warren Hughes (United Kingdom) Jamie Campbell-Walter	Nissan	24	−1 Lap
20 DNF	6	(Switzerland) Matech Competition	(Switzerland) Romain Grosjean (Switzerland) Neel Jani	Ford	23	−2 Laps
21 DNF	9	(France) Hexis AMR	(France) Frédéric Makowiecki (France) Thomas Accary	Aston Martin	7	Retired
22 DNF	14	(Germany) Phoenix Racing / Carsport	(Italy) Andrea Piccini (Belgium) Anthony Kumpen	Corvette	2	Retired
23 DNF	1	(Germany) Vitaphone Racing Team	(Italy) Andrea Bertolini (Germany) Michael Bartels	Maserati	1	Retired
EX	13	(Germany) Phoenix Racing / Carsport	(Netherlands) Mike Hezemans (Germany) Marc Hennerici	Corvette	25	Excluded

=== Championship race ===
==== Race result ====
Pos	No.	Team	Drivers	Manufacturer	Laps	Time/Retired
1	25	(Germany) Reiter	(Brazil) Ricardo Zonta (Germany) Frank Kechele	Lamborghini	24	
2	33	(Germany) Triple H Team Hegersport	(Germany) Altfrid Heger (Germany) Alex Müller	Maserati	24	−3.253
3	5	(Switzerland) Matech Competition	(Germany) Thomas Mutsch (United Kingdom) Richard Westbrook	Ford	24	−6.675
4	2	(Germany) Vitaphone Racing Team	(Portugal) Miguel Ramos (Brazil) Enrique Bernoldi	Maserati	24	−7.074
5	9	(France) Hexis AMR	(France) Frédéric Makowiecki (France) Thomas Accary	Aston Martin	24	−7.936
6	7	(Germany) Young Driver AMR	(Czech Republic) Tomáš Enge (United Kingdom) Darren Turner	Aston Martin	24	−8.274
7	1	(Germany) Vitaphone Racing Team	(Germany) Michael Bartels (Italy) Andrea Bertolini	Maserati	24	−9.741
8	34	(Germany) Triple H Team Hegersport	(Belgium) Bert Longin (Belgium) Nico Verdonck	Maserati	24	−10.591
9	38	(Germany) All-Inkl.com Münnich Motorsport	(Netherlands) Nicky Pastorelli (Germany) Dominik Schwager	Lamborghini	24	−10.784
10	10	(France) Hexis AMR	(Monaco) Clivio Piccione (Switzerland) Jonathan Hirschi	Aston Martin	24	−13.921
11	22	(United Kingdom) Sumo Power GT	(United Kingdom) Warren Hughes (United Kingdom) Jamie Campbell-Walter	Nissan	24	−14.140
12	3	(Switzerland) Swiss Racing Team	(Austria) Karl Wendlinger (Switzerland) Henri Moser	Nissan	24	−14.346
13	13	(Germany) Phoenix Racing / Carsport	(Germany) Marc Hennerici (Netherlands) Mike Hezemans	Corvette	23	−15.056
14	6	(Switzerland) Matech Competition	(Switzerland) Romain Grosjean (Switzerland) Neel Jani	Ford	24	−15.354
15	41	(Belgium) Marc VDS Racing Team	(Belgium) Renaud Kuppens (Finland) Markus Palttala	Ford	24	−19.486
16	4	(Switzerland) Swiss Racing Team	(Sweden) Max Nilsson (Japan) Seiji Ara	Nissan	24	−23.695
17	12	(Belgium) Mad-Croc Racing	(Finland) Pertti Kuismanen (United Kingdom) Oliver Gavin	Corvette	24	−33.139
18 DNF	23	(United Kingdom) Sumo Power GT	(United Kingdom) Peter Dumbreck (Germany) Michael Krumm	Nissan	22	Retired
19 DNF	8	(Germany) Young Driver AMR	(Germany) Stefan Mücke (Denmark) Christoffer Nygaard	Aston Martin	19	Retired
20 DNF	24	(Germany) Reiter	(Netherlands) Peter Kox (Germany) Christopher Haase	Lamborghini	15	Retired
21 DNF	37	(Germany) All-Inkl.com Münnich Motorsport	(Germany) Marc Basseng (France) Christophe Bouchut	Lamborghini	11	Retired
22 DNF	40	(Belgium) Marc VDS Racing Team	(Belgium) Bas Leinders (Belgium) Maxime Martin	Ford	10	Retired
23 DNF	11	(Belgium) Mad-Croc Racing	(Netherlands) Xavier Maassen (Netherlands) Jos Menten	Corvette	8	Puncture
24 DNF	14	(Germany) Phoenix Racing / Carsport	(Belgium) Anthony Kumpen (Italy) Andrea Piccini	Corvette	3	Retired

FIA GT1 World Championship
Previous race: Paul Ricard	2010 season	Next race: Nürburgring
