= 2010 FIA GT1 Interlagos round =

Autódromo José Carlos Pace

The 2010 FIA GT1 Interlagos round is an auto racing event held at the Autódromo José Carlos Pace, São Paulo, Brazil on 27–28 November 2010, and served as the Penultimate round of the 2010 FIA GT1 World Championship season. The event shared the weekend with the final round of the Brazilian GT Championship. The All-Brazilian pairing of Enrique Bernoldi and Alexandre Negrão of the Vitaphone Racing Team Maserati earned pole position. The Young Driver AMR partnership of Tomáš Enge and Darren Turner took the checkered flag in the Qualifying Race by overtaking the Maserati of Bernoldi and Negrão during the pit-stops.

== Qualifying ==
=== Qualifying result ===
For qualifying, Driver 1 participates in the first and third sessions while Driver 2 participates in only the second session. The fastest lap for each session is indicated with bold.

Pos	No.	Driver 1	Team	Session 1	Session 2	Session 3	Grid
Pos	No.	Driver 2	Team	Session 1	Session 2	Session 3	Grid
1	2	(Brazil) Enrique Bernoldi	(Germany) Vitaphone Racing Team	1:32.553	1:32.733	1:32.060	1
1	2	(Brazil) Alexandre Negrão	(Germany) Vitaphone Racing Team	1:32.553	1:32.733	1:32.060	1
2	38	(Netherlands) Nicky Pastorelli	(Germany) All-Inkl.com Münnich Motorsport	1:32.404	1:32.420	1:32.087	2
2	38	(Germany) Dominik Schwager	(Germany) All-Inkl.com Münnich Motorsport	1:32.404	1:32.420	1:32.087	2
3	7	(United Kingdom) Darren Turner	(Germany) Young Driver AMR	1:32.817	1:32.987	1:32.169	3
3	7	(Czech Republic) Tomáš Enge	(Germany) Young Driver AMR	1:32.817	1:32.987	1:32.169	3
4	13	(Germany) Marc Hennerici	(Belgium) Phoenix Racing/Carsport	1:33.070	1:32.739	1:32.410	4
4	13	(Greece) Alexander Margaritis	(Belgium) Phoenix Racing/Carsport	1:33.070	1:32.739	1:32.410	4
5	5	(United Kingdom) Richard Westbrook	(Switzerland) Matech Competition	1:32.746	1:32.772	1:32.468	8
5	5	(Germany) Thomas Mutsch	(Switzerland) Matech Competition	1:32.746	1:32.772	1:32.468	8
6	23	(Germany) Michael Krumm	(United Kingdom) Sumo Power GT	1:32.731	1:32.656	1:32.500	5
6	23	(United Kingdom) Peter Dumbreck	(United Kingdom) Sumo Power GT	1:32.731	1:32.656	1:32.500	5
7	25	(Germany) Frank Kechele	(Germany) Reiter	1:32.520	1:33.093	1:32.516	6
7	25	(Brazil) Ricardo Zonta	(Germany) Reiter	1:32.520	1:33.093	1:32.516	6
8	6	(Switzerland) Neel Jani	(France) Hexis AMR	1:32.544	1:32.825	1:32.773	7
8	6	(France) Nicolas Armindo	(France) Hexis AMR	1:32.544	1:32.825	1:32.773	7
9	41	(Italy) Matteo Bobbi	(Belgium) Marc VDS Racing Team	1:32.915	1:33.174		9
9	41	(Finland) Markus Palttala	(Belgium) Marc VDS Racing Team	1:32.915	1:33.174		9
10	10	(Monaco) Clivio Piccione	(France) Hexis AMR	1:32.622	1:33.192		10
10	10	(Switzerland) Jonathan Hirschi	(France) Hexis AMR	1:32.622	1:33.192		10
11	40	(Belgium) Bas Leinders	(Belgium) Marc VDS Racing Team	1:32.511	1:33.488		11
11	40	(Belgium) Maxime Martin	(Belgium) Marc VDS Racing Team	1:32.511	1:33.488		11
12	22	(United Kingdom) Warren Hughes	(United Kingdom) Sumo Power GT	1:32.955	1:33.559		12
12	22	(United Kingdom) Jamie Campbell-Walter	(United Kingdom) Sumo Power GT	1:32.955	1:33.559		12
13	3	(Austria) Karl Wendlinger	(Switzerland) Swiss Racing Team	1:33.106	1:33.814		13
13	3	(Switzerland) Henri Moser	(Switzerland) Swiss Racing Team	1:33.106	1:33.814		13
14	9	(France) Frédéric Makowiecki	(France) Hexis AMR	1:33.095	1:34.120		14
14	9	(France) Yann Clairay	(France) Hexis AMR	1:33.095	1:34.120		14
15	11	(Brazil) Claudio Dahruj	(Belgium) Mad-Croc Racing	1:32.233	1:35.076		15
15	11	(Brazil) Sérgio Jimenez	(Belgium) Mad-Croc Racing	1:32.233	1:35.076		15
16	34	(Brazil) Daniel Serra	(Germany) Triple H Team Hegersport	1:32.199	1:35.948		16
16	34	(Brazil) Francisco Longo	(Germany) Triple H Team Hegersport	1:32.199	1:35.948		16
17	12	(Netherlands) Duncan Huisman	(Belgium) Mad-Croc Racing	1:33.131			17
17	12	(Finland) Pertti Kuismanen	(Belgium) Mad-Croc Racing	1:33.131			17
18	24	(Netherlands) Peter Kox	(Germany) Reiter	1:33.320			21
18	24	(Germany) Christopher Haase	(Germany) Reiter	1:33.320			21
19	1	(Italy) Andrea Bertolini	(Germany) Vitaphone Racing Team	1:33.331			18
19	1	(Germany) Michael Bartels	(Germany) Vitaphone Racing Team	1:33.331			18
20	8	(Germany) Stefan Mücke	(Germany) Young Driver AMR	1:33.386			19
20	8	(Denmark) Christoffer Nygaard	(Germany) Young Driver AMR	1:33.386			19
21	4	(Sweden) Max Nilsson	(Switzerland) Swiss Racing Team	1:33.497			20
21	4	(Japan) Seiji Ara	(Switzerland) Swiss Racing Team	1:33.497			20
22	37	(Germany) Marc Basseng	(Germany) All-Inkl.com Münnich Motorsport	1:33.592			DSQ
22	37	(France) Christophe Bouchut	(Germany) All-Inkl.com Münnich Motorsport	1:33.592			DSQ
23	33	(Germany) Alex Müller	(Germany) Triple H Team Hegersport	1:33.857			22
23	33	(Germany) Altfrid Heger	(Germany) Triple H Team Hegersport	1:33.857			22

== Qualifying Race ==
=== Race result ===
Pos	No.	Team	Drivers	Manufacturer	Laps	Time/Retired
1	7	(Germany) Young Driver AMR	(Czech Republic) Tomáš Enge (United Kingdom) Darren Turner	Aston Martin	38	
2	23	(United Kingdom) Sumo Power GT	(United Kingdom) Peter Dumbreck (Germany) Michael Krumm	Nissan	38	−9.032
3	10	(France) Hexis AMR	(Monaco) Clivio Piccione (Switzerland) Jonathan Hirschi	Aston Martin	38	−9.736
4	2	(Germany) Vitaphone Racing Team	(Brazil) Enrique Bernoldi (Brazil) Alexandre Negrão	Maserati	38	−22.763
5	38	(Germany) All-Inkl.com Münnich Motorsport	(Germany) Dominik Schwager (Netherlands) Nicky Pastorelli	Lamborghini	38	−24.814
6	13	(Germany) Phoenix Racing / Carsport	(Germany) Marc Hennerici (Greece) Alexander Margaritis	Corvette	38	−27.297
7	6	(Switzerland) Matech Competition	(Switzerland) Neel Jani (France) Nicolas Armindo	Ford	38	−27.390
8	1	(Germany) Vitaphone Racing Team	(Italy) Andrea Bertolini (Germany) Michael Bartels	Maserati	38	−38.750
9	24	(Germany) Reiter	(Netherlands) Peter Kox (Germany) Christopher Haase	Lamborghini	38	−39.093
10	33	(Germany) Triple H Team Hegersport	(Germany) Altfrid Heger (Germany) Alex Müller	Maserati	38	−42.679
11	40	(Belgium) Marc VDS Racing Team	(Belgium) Maxime Martin (Belgium) Bas Leinders	Ford	38	−44.169
12	8	(Germany) Young Driver AMR	(Denmark) Christoffer Nygaard (Germany) Stefan Mücke	Aston Martin	38	−45.213
13	4	(Switzerland) Swiss Racing Team	(Sweden) Max Nilsson (Japan) Seiji Ara	Nissan	38	−56.430
14	22	(United Kingdom) Sumo Power GT	(United Kingdom) Jamie Campbell-Walter (United Kingdom) Warren Hughes	Nissan	38	−58.497
15	9	(France) Hexis AMR	(France) Frédéric Makowiecki (France) Yann Clairay	Aston Martin	38	−1:01.422
16	34	(Germany) Triple H Team Hegersport	(Brazil) Daniel Serra (Brazil) Francisco Longo	Maserati	38	−1:04.615
17	3	(Switzerland) Swiss Racing Team	(Austria) Karl Wendlinger (Switzerland) Henri Moser	Nissan	38	−1:13.685
18	12	(Belgium) Mad-Croc Racing	(Netherlands) Duncan Huisman (Finland) Pertti Kuismanen	Corvette	37	−1 Lap
19	11	(Belgium) Mad-Croc Racing	(Brazil) Sérgio Jimenez (Brazil) Claudio Dahruj	Corvette	37	−1 Lap
20	41	(Belgium) Marc VDS Racing Team	(Italy) Matteo Bobbi (Finland) Markus Palttala	Ford	36	−2 Laps
21 DNF	25	(Germany) Reiter	(Brazil) Ricardo Zonta (Germany) Frank Kechele	Lamborghini	2	Collision
22 DNF	5	(Switzerland) Matech Competition	(United Kingdom) Richard Westbrook (Germany) Thomas Mutsch	Ford	2	Collision

== Championship Race ==
=== Race result ===
Pos	No.	Team	Drivers	Manufacturer	Laps	Time/Retired
1	2	(Germany) Vitaphone Racing Team	(Brazil) Enrique Bernoldi (Brazil) Alexandre Negrão	Maserati	38	
2	7	(Germany) Young Driver AMR	(Czech Republic) Tomáš Enge (United Kingdom) Darren Turner	Aston Martin	38	−2.348
3	13	(Germany) Phoenix Racing / Carsport	(Germany) Marc Hennerici (Greece) Alexander Margaritis	Corvette	38	−5.874
4	10	(France) Hexis AMR	(Monaco) Clivio Piccione (Switzerland) Jonathan Hirschi	Aston Martin	38	−6.077
5	40	(Belgium) Marc VDS Racing Team	(Belgium) Maxime Martin (Belgium) Bas Leinders	Ford	38	−9.060
6	23	(United Kingdom) Sumo Power GT	(United Kingdom) Peter Dumbreck (Germany) Michael Krumm	Nissan	38	−10.574
7	38	(Germany) All-Inkl.com Münnich Motorsport	(Germany) Dominik Schwager (Netherlands) Nicky Pastorelli	Lamborghini	38	−11.367
8	6	(Switzerland) Matech Competition	(Switzerland) Neel Jani (France) Nicolas Armindo	Ford	38	−22.358
9	1	(Germany) Vitaphone Racing Team	(Italy) Andrea Bertolini (Germany) Michael Bartels	Maserati	38	−22.925
10	33	(Germany) Triple H Team Hegersport	(Germany) Altfrid Heger (Germany) Alex Müller	Maserati	38	−23.225
11	8	(Germany) Young Driver AMR	(Denmark) Christoffer Nygaard (Germany) Stefan Mücke	Aston Martin	38	−31.682
12	24	(Germany) Reiter	(Netherlands) Peter Kox (Germany) Christopher Haase	Lamborghini	38	−43.720
13	9	(France) Hexis AMR	(France) Frédéric Makowiecki (France) Yann Clairay	Aston Martin	38	−45.738
14	5	(Switzerland) Matech Competition	(United Kingdom) Richard Westbrook (Germany) Thomas Mutsch	Ford	38	−52.474
15	41	(Belgium) Marc VDS Racing Team	(Italy) Matteo Bobbi (Finland) Markus Palttala	Ford	38	−54.724
16	4	(Switzerland) Swiss Racing Team	(Japan) Seiji Ara (Sweden) Max Nilsson	Nissan	38	−1:11.191
17	34	(Germany) Triple H Team Hegersport	(Brazil) Daniel Serra (Brazil) Francisco Longo	Maserati	38	−1:18.694
18	3	(Switzerland) Swiss Racing Team	(Austria) Karl Wendlinger (Switzerland) Henri Moser	Nissan	38	−1:34.780
19	12	(Belgium) Mad-Croc Racing	(Netherlands) Duncan Huisman (Finland) Pertti Kuismanen	Corvette	37	−1 Lap
20	11	(Belgium) Mad-Croc Racing	(Brazil) Sérgio Jimenez (Brazil) Claudio Dahruj	Corvette	31	−7 Laps
21 DNF	22	(United Kingdom) Sumo Power GT	(United Kingdom) Jamie Campbell-Walter (United Kingdom) Warren Hughes	Nissan	23	Retired
22 DNF	25	(Germany) Reiter	(Brazil) Ricardo Zonta (Germany) Frank Kechele	Lamborghini	6	Mechanical

FIA GT1 World Championship
Previous race: Navarra	2010 season	Next race: San Luis
