= 2010 FIA GT1 World Championship =

Motor racing contest

Seasons
- ← 2009 (FIA GT) 2011 →

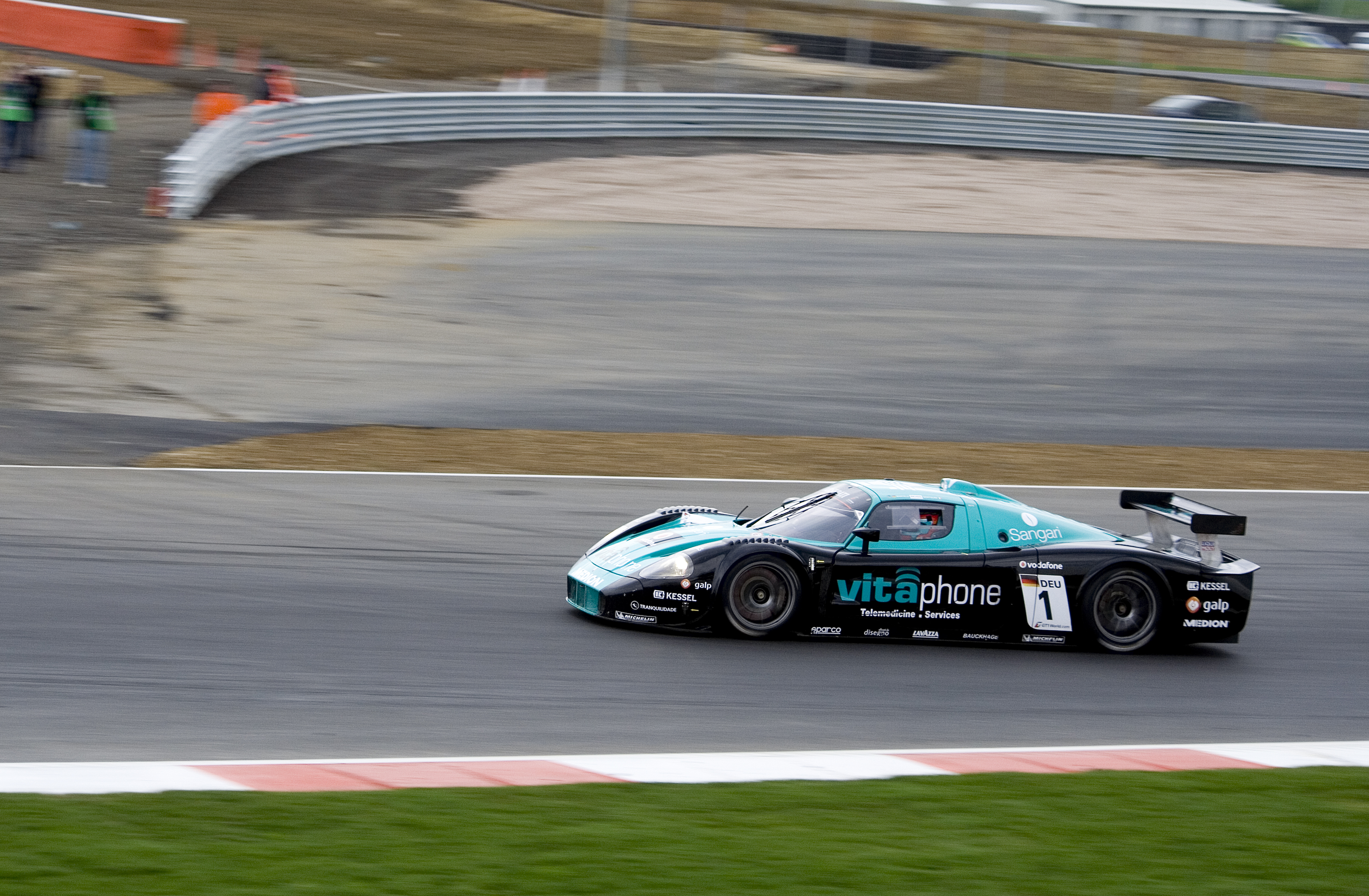
Vitaphone Racing won the inaugural FIA GT1 Teams' World Championship with its Maserati MC12s and drivers Michael Bartels and Andrea Bertolini won the Drivers' World Championship

The 2010 FIA GT1 World Championship was the inaugural FIA GT1 World Championship, a motor racing competition reserved for FIA GT1 cars. The championship was a replacement for the FIA GT Championship which had been held annually from 1997 to 2009. It was the first sports car racing series to be sanctioned by the Fédération Internationale de l'Automobile (FIA) as a World Championship since the demise of the World Sportscar Championship at the end of the 1992 season.

Developed by the Stéphane Ratel Organisation (SRO), the 2010 championship was decided over ten events in ten countries on three continents. It was contested by twelve teams, each being independent of the automobile manufacturer that they represented, although they were permitted limited support from that manufacturer. Aston Martin, Corvette, Ford, Lamborghini, Maserati, and Nissan were each represented by two teams. Unlike the FIA GT Championship, where several tyre manufacturers competed, the FIA GT1 World Championship has a single provider, Michelin.

Michael Bartels and Andrea Bertolini, who won the final FIA GT Championship for Drivers in 2009, won the first GT1 World Championship for Drivers with a race to spare. Despite finishing twelfth in the Qualification Race in Argentina, Bartels and Bertolini were assured of the title as the Young Driver AMR pairing of Tomáš Enge and Darren Turner could only finish tenth which failed to keep them within reach. A non-scoring weekend for Enge and Turner dropped them to fourth in the final championship standings, as Matech Competition's Thomas Mutsch and Hexis AMR's Frédéric Makowiecki moved into second and third places respectively as Makowiecki won both races and Mutsch finished second in each race. With the assistance of Miguel Ramos, Enrique Bernoldi and Alexandre Negrão in the team's second car during the season, Vitaphone Racing also claimed the Teams' Championship in the same race, as Young Driver AMR, Hexis AMR and Reiter all failed to score enough points to take the championship to a final race.

Aston Martin was awarded the SRO Trophy for Manufacturers.

== Calendar ==
The SRO announced a provisional 2010 calendar featuring twelve events, although host circuits were not named. A revised twelve event calendar was announced on 21 October 2009, removing the previously planned rounds for Argentina, Australia, Bulgaria, Italy, Romania, and Russia. Eastern Creek Raceway had been part of the unsuccessful bid for the Australian round, while the Russian round planned for 2010 was cancelled due to delays in the completion of the Eurasia Autodromo, while Romania's planned event was cancelled due to a change in the Bucharest government. A further calendar was released on 11 December 2009 with just ten rounds listed, removing the proposed Canadian, Hungarian, and Chinese rounds but adding the Argentinian round at the Potrero de los Funes Circuit once more. The Yas Marina Circuit later requested to the FIA that their event be pushed back two weeks to the weekend of 17 April in order to avoid a conflict with the FIA World Cup for Cross Country Rallies which was to be held in the United Arab Emirates on 5 April. The British round was to incorporate the RAC Tourist Trophy while also serving as the first motor racing event held on the newly built Arena layout for the Silverstone Circuit. Circuit de Spa-Francorchamps would continue to host a round, but the GT1 races would be held separately from the Spa 24 Hours during the same weekend.

In July 2010, following delays in completing alterations to the Durban street circuit due to construction for the 2010 FIFA World Cup, the South African round was postponed until 2011. A Spanish event at the brand new Circuito de Navarra was proposed as a replacement for Durban on the calendar, and was confirmed at the FIA World Motor Sport Council meeting of 24 October.

All events consisted of a one-hour Qualifying race and a one-hour Championship race. For European rounds, FIA GT1 would be joined at the circuit by the FIA GT3 European Championship.

Rnd	Circuit	Date
1	Yas Marina Circuit, Abu Dhabi, United Arab Emirates	17 April
2	Silverstone Circuit, United Kingdom	2 May
3	Masaryk Circuit, Brno, Czech Republic	23 May
4	Circuit Paul Ricard, Le Castellet, France	4 July
5	Circuit de Spa-Francorchamps, Belgium	31 July
6	Nürburgring, Germany	29 August
7	Autódromo Internacional do Algarve, Portimão, Portugal	19 September
8	Circuito de Navarra, Los Arcos, Spain	24 October
9	Autódromo José Carlos Pace, São Paulo, Brazil	28 November
10	Potrero de los Funes Circuit, San Luis, Argentina	5 December

== Entries ==
=== Manufacturers ===
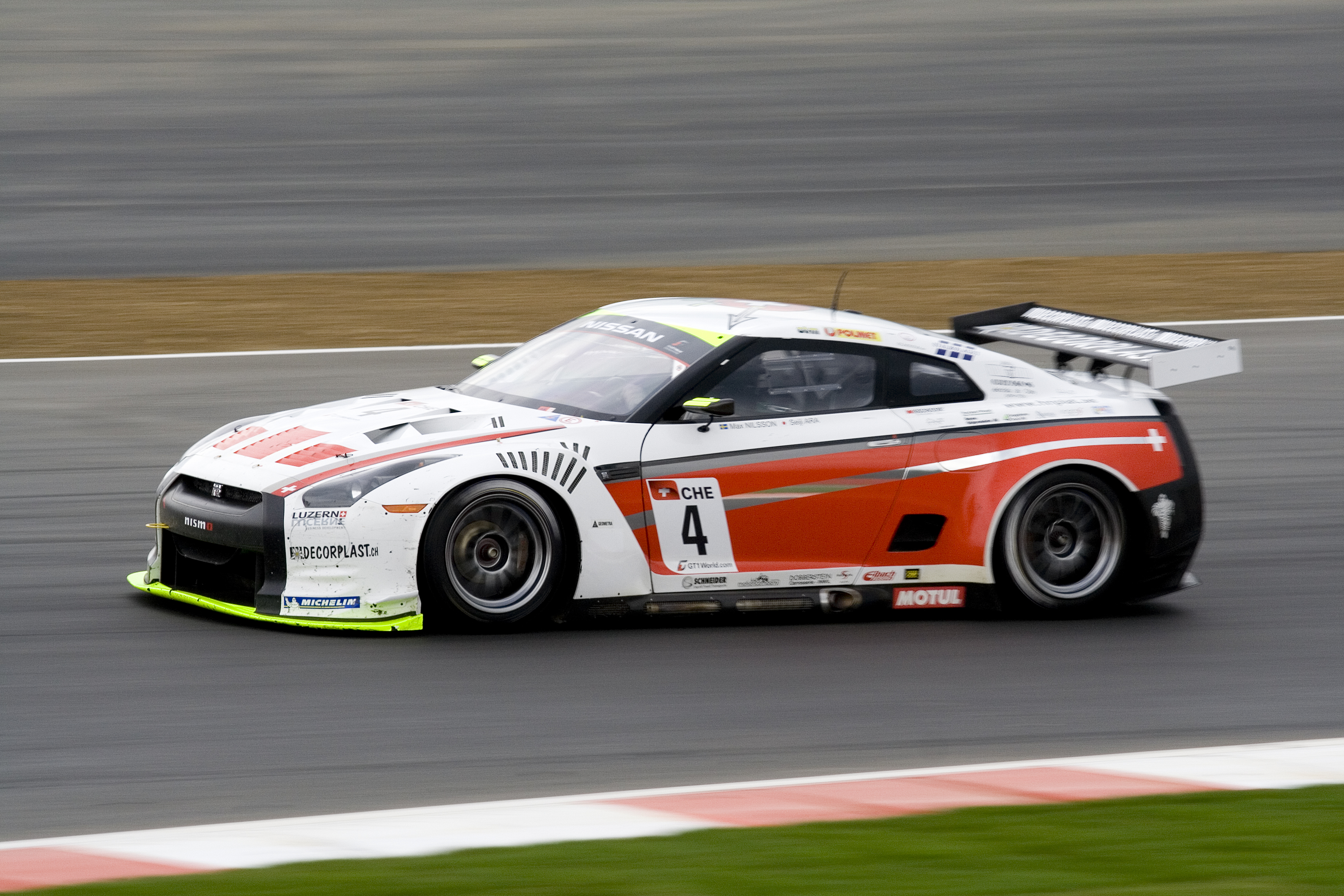
Nissan GT-R GT1s were entered by the Swiss Racing Team (pictured) and Sumo Power GT

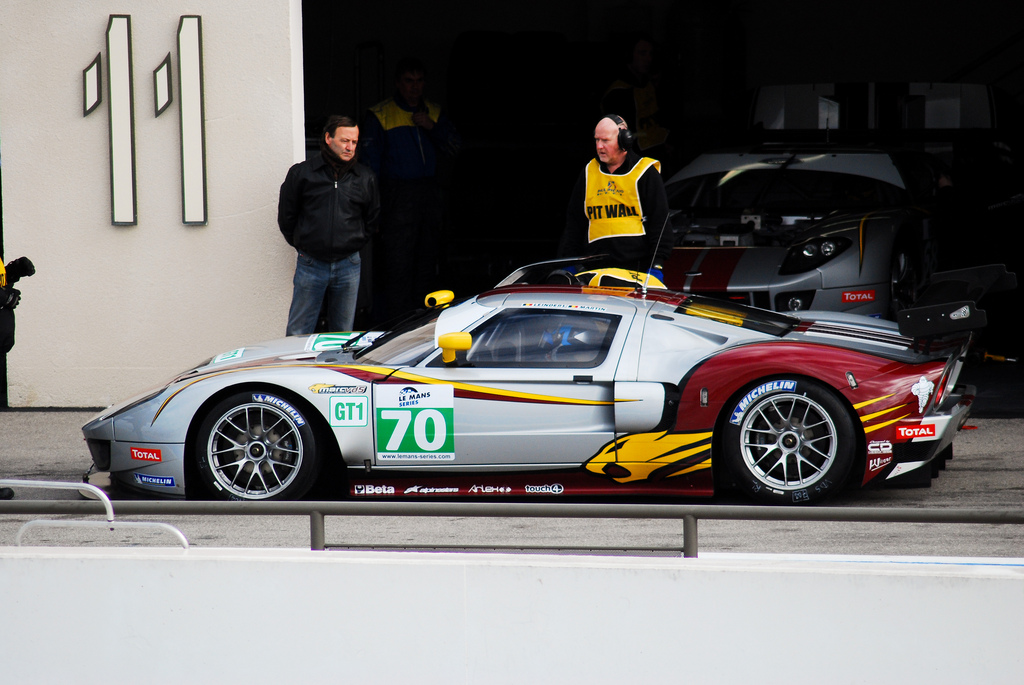
A Ford GT1, built by Matech Concepts specifically for the 2010 championship and entered by Marc VDS Racing Team

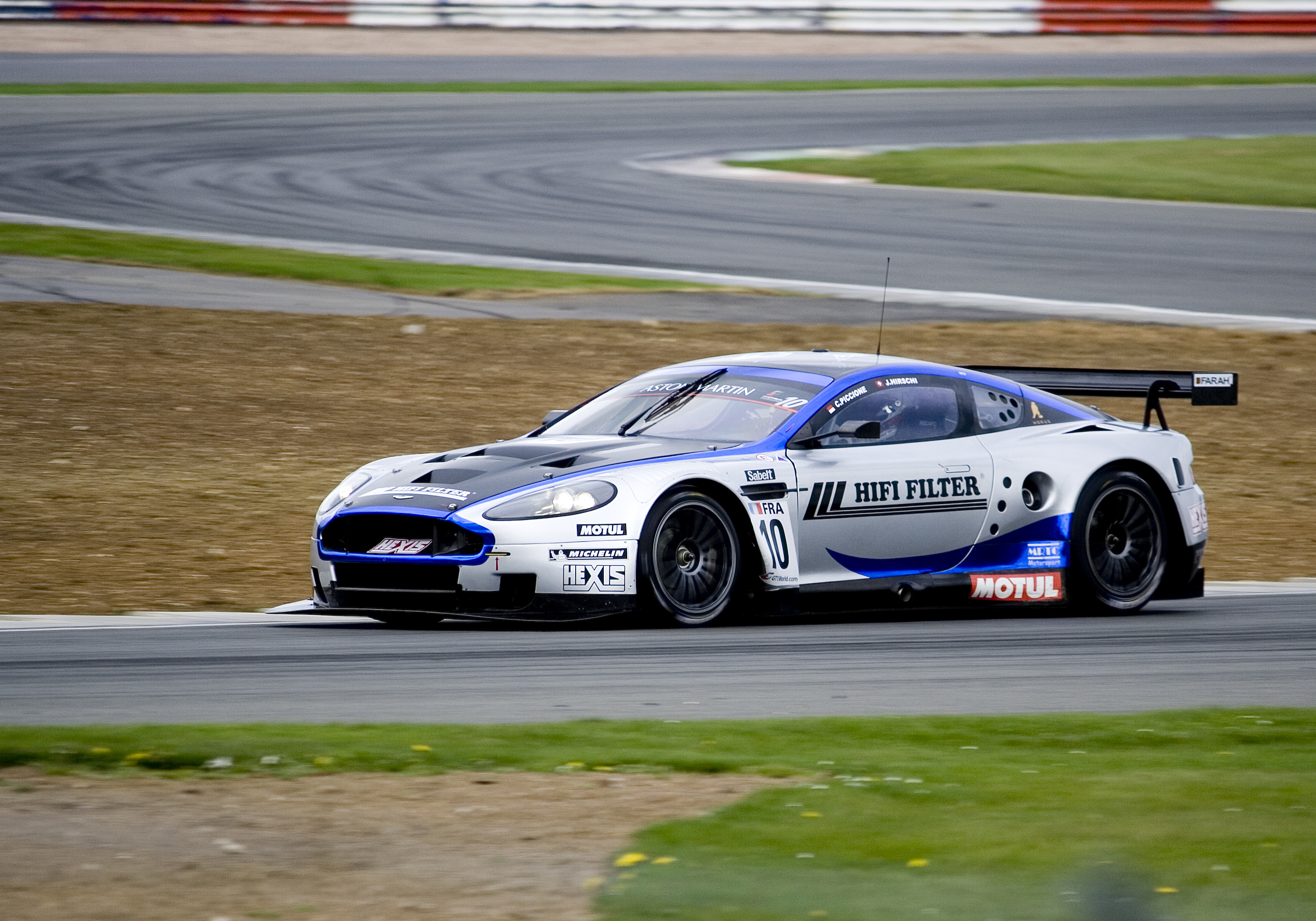
The Aston Martin DBR9, a previous winner in the FIA GT Championship, has been modified to comply with the 2010 FIA GT1 regulations

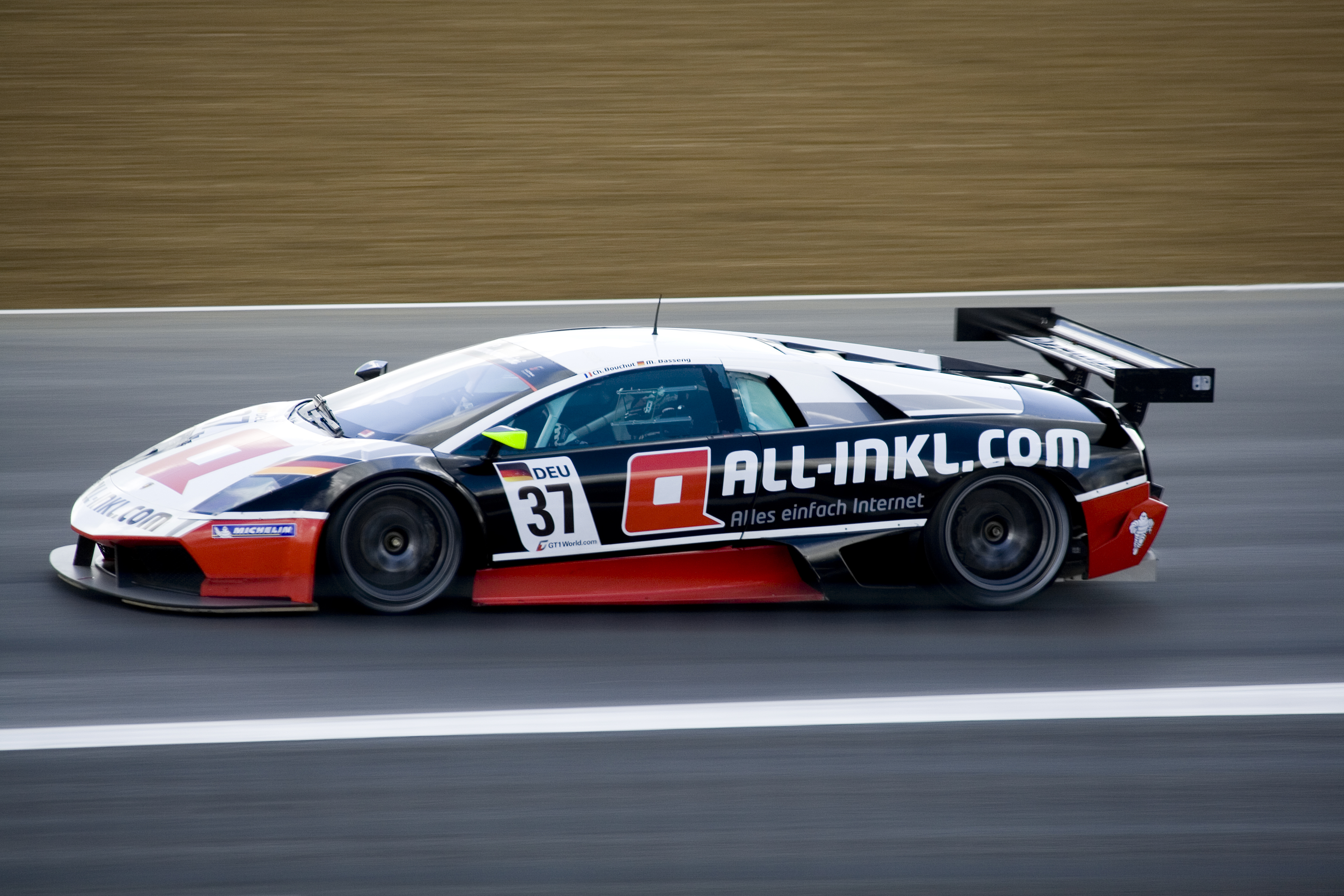
Lamborghini was represented by Reiter and All-Inkl.com Münnich Motorsport

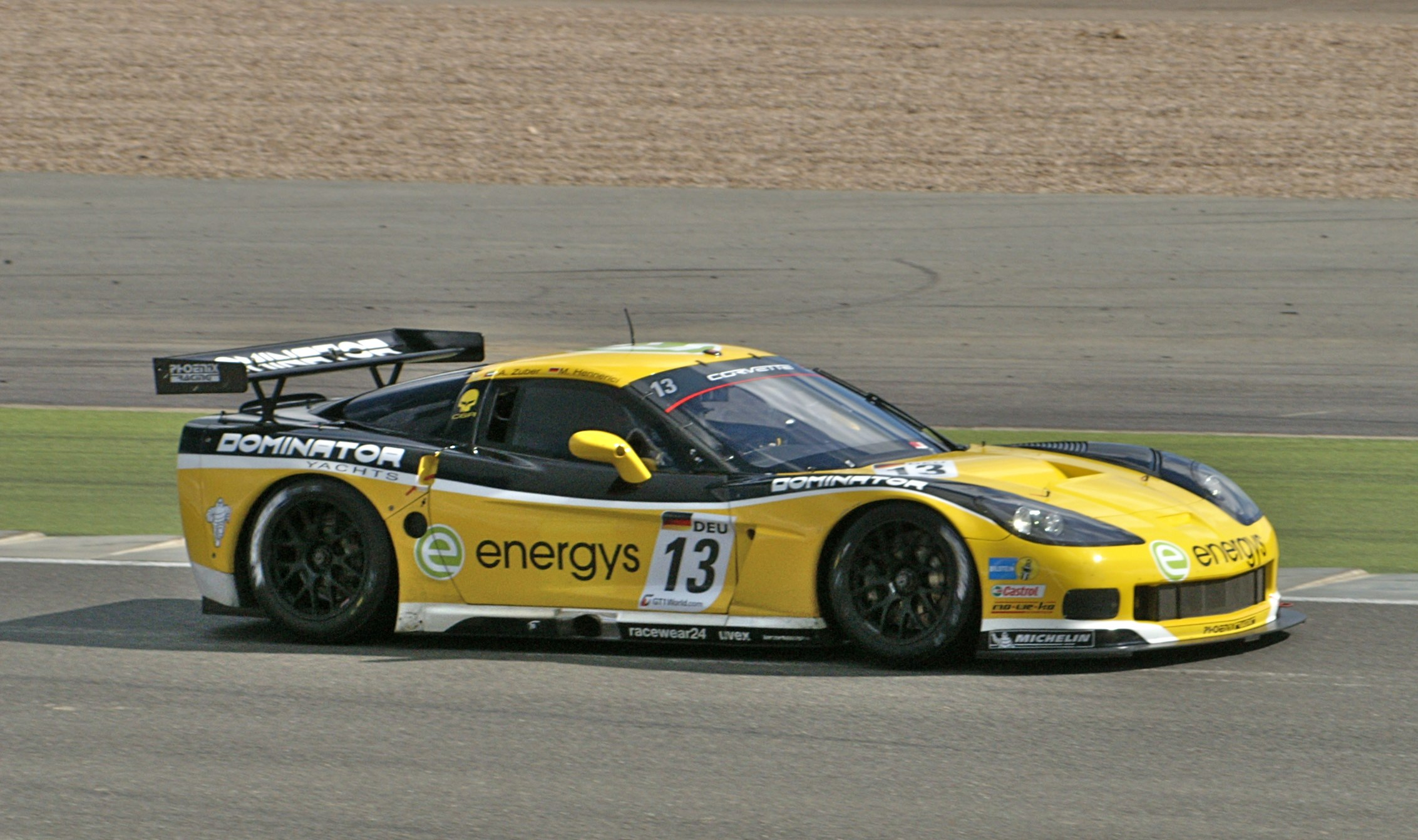
Corvette was represented by Mad-Croc Racing and Phoenix Racing / Carsport

The SRO initially expected at least five manufacturers to participate in the inaugural 2010 season. A maximum of six manufacturers would be accepted, with each manufacturer limited to supplying two privateer teams of no more than two cars. To ensure close competition, each model of car would be tested by the FIA to determine any mandatory adjustments for performance balancing. The FIA employed Christophe Bouchut, Anthony Davidson, and Heinz-Harald Frentzen for balance of performance test sessions held at Circuit Paul Ricard as well as just prior to the first race event at Yas Marina Circuit.

As of June 2009, three manufacturers had announced their entries for the 2010 season. Nissan's performance division, Nismo, developed their GT-R for GT1; the GT-R was initially tested for the World Championship by competing in select 2009 FIA GT events with Gigawave Motorsport. Ford also used 2009 as a development year for its Ford GT race car built by Matech Concepts. Lamborghini was the third announced manufacturer, fielding a car based on the Murciélago LP670-4 SV and built by Reiter Engineering who had built the previous GT1-spec Murciélago R-GT.

Following the announcement of the initial three manufacturers, Aston Martin Racing and Prodrive submitted a proposal to the FIA World Motor Sport Council for modifications to the existing Aston Martin DBR9 to allow customers to enter the series. The FIA would be required to make technical waivers on the DBR9 in order for it to be allowed to compete. General Motors' Corvette brand also asked for a technical waiver on a modification to their 2009 Corvette C6.Rs in order to compete in 2010. Maserati and Saleen also sought those technical waivers for their 2009 cars, but required a further waiver due to the MC12 and S7 not meeting the minimum requirement of 300 production cars for the 2010 regulations. In November 2009, the SRO confirmed their six manufacturers for the 2010 season, allowing Corvette, Aston Martin, and Maserati their technical waivers to join Nissan, Ford, and Lamborghini.

=== Teams ===
For the teams which represented each of the six manufacturers, two privateers were selected by each manufacturer. During the launch of the FIA GT1 World Championship, Matech Concepts and VDS Racing Team announced their continuation with the Ford GT project. Hexis Racing of France also announced their intent to participate in the series with Aston Martin, joining fellow FIA GT3 European Championship competitor Fischer Racing which would participate under the Young Driver AMR title. Swiss Racing Team announced on 5 November that they would enter using the Nissan GT-R, to team alongside Sumo Power GT which replaced the departing 2009 development team of Gigawave Motorsport.

Maserati retained the five-time FIA GT champions Vitaphone Racing Team, while the second squad was formed by Altfrid Heger's Triple H Team Hegersport of Germany. Corvette also retained several of its privateer teams from the FIA GT Championship, with DKR Engineering and Selleslagh Racing Team combining their C6.Rs to form Mad Croc Racing, and Phoenix Racing and Carsport Holland merging into Phoenix Racing Carsport. Lamborghini would be represented by previous Lamborghini FIA GT campaigners Reiter and Münnich Motorsport.

On 17 January 2010 the SRO confirmed the twelve teams which had submitted entries for the championship.

=== Drivers ===
Each event comprised 48 drivers, with many of these drivers featuring in every round of the season. The full-season line-up included drivers from varying backgrounds, including experienced sports car drivers and relative newcomers. Seven former FIA GT Champions were contracted with teams, including three-time co-champions Michael Bartels and Andrea Bertolini once again sharing a Vitaphone Maserati. Fellow three-time champion Christophe Bouchut drove one of Münnich Motorsports' Lamborghinis, while 1998 champion Ricardo Zonta returned with the fellow Lamborghini at Reiter. 1999 champion and the record holder for most FIA GT wins, Karl Wendlinger was enlisted by Swiss Racing Team for Nissan while 2000 champion Jamie Campbell-Walter drove the Nissan of Sumo Power. 2003 champion Matteo Bobbi returned to a Maserati for the Hegersport squad. Other sports car veterans included 2004 24 Hours of Le Mans winner Seiji Ara and 2007 FIA GT3 Champion Henri Moser at Swiss Racing, 2008 Le Mans Series champions Tomáš Enge and Stefan Mücke co-driving for Young Driver AMR, former American Le Mans Series champions Mika Salo and Oliver Gavin driving a Mad-Croc Corvette, and two-time Super GT champion Michael Krumm with Sumo Power.

Several drivers already had world championship experience in other forms of motorsport, including the Formula One World Championship and World Touring Car Championship. Romain Grosjean moved directly from a 2009 seat at Renault F1 to drive for Matech Competition in GT1, while former Formula One driver Enrique Bernoldi, who had won races during his rookie season in the 2009 FIA GT Championship, switched to Vitaphone Maserati. Jean-Denis Délétraz was another driver with experience in grand prix racing. Drivers making the transition from touring car racing to sports cars included Hegersport founder Altfrid Heger and 2005 WTCC Independents Champion Marc Hennerici.

A unique driver line-up amongst the field of 24 cars was the No.6 Matech Ford which featuring the only females in the series. The two Swiss women, Natacha Gachnang and Cyndie Allemann, both had experience in various open wheel racing series, but were teaming together to make their debuts in sports car racing.

=== Entry list ===
On 27 January 2010 the FIA published the full entry list of teams and manufacturers for the 2010 season. On 26 February 2010 the SRO published a first partial entry-list of drivers. All teams used Michelin tyres.

Team	Car	Engine	No.	Drivers	Rounds
(Germany) Vitaphone Racing Team	Maserati MC12 GT1	Maserati M144B/2 6.0 L V12	1	(Germany) Michael Bartels	All
(Germany) Vitaphone Racing Team	Maserati MC12 GT1	Maserati M144B/2 6.0 L V12	1	(Italy) Andrea Bertolini	All
(Germany) Vitaphone Racing Team	Maserati MC12 GT1	Maserati M144B/2 6.0 L V12	2	(Portugal) Miguel Ramos	1–8, 10
(Germany) Vitaphone Racing Team	Maserati MC12 GT1	Maserati M144B/2 6.0 L V12	2	(Brazil) Enrique Bernoldi	All
(Germany) Vitaphone Racing Team	Maserati MC12 GT1	Maserati M144B/2 6.0 L V12	2	(Brazil) Alexandre Negrão	9
(Switzerland) Swiss Racing Team	Nissan GT-R GT1	Nissan VK56DE 5.6 L V8	3	(Austria) Karl Wendlinger	All
(Switzerland) Swiss Racing Team	Nissan GT-R GT1	Nissan VK56DE 5.6 L V8	3	(Switzerland) Henri Moser	All
(Switzerland) Swiss Racing Team	Nissan GT-R GT1	Nissan VK56DE 5.6 L V8	4	(Sweden) Max Nilsson	All
(Switzerland) Swiss Racing Team	Nissan GT-R GT1	Nissan VK56DE 5.6 L V8	4	(Japan) Seiji Ara	All
(Switzerland) Matech Competition	Ford GT1	Ford Cammer 5.3 L V8	5	(Switzerland) Romain Grosjean	1–4
(Switzerland) Matech Competition	Ford GT1	Ford Cammer 5.3 L V8	5	(United Kingdom) Richard Westbrook	5–10
(Switzerland) Matech Competition	Ford GT1	Ford Cammer 5.3 L V8	5	(Germany) Thomas Mutsch	All
(Switzerland) Matech Competition	Ford GT1	Ford Cammer 5.3 L V8	6	(Switzerland) Natacha Gachnang	1, 4
(Switzerland) Matech Competition	Ford GT1	Ford Cammer 5.3 L V8	6	(Switzerland) Cyndie Allemann	1, 3
(Switzerland) Matech Competition	Ford GT1	Ford Cammer 5.3 L V8	6	(Switzerland) Rahel Frey	3
(Switzerland) Matech Competition	Ford GT1	Ford Cammer 5.3 L V8	6	(France) Olivier Panis	4
(Switzerland) Matech Competition	Ford GT1	Ford Cammer 5.3 L V8	6	(France) Romain Grosjean	5
(Switzerland) Matech Competition	Ford GT1	Ford Cammer 5.3 L V8	6	(Switzerland) Neel Jani	5–10
(Switzerland) Matech Competition	Ford GT1	Ford Cammer 5.3 L V8	6	(France) Nicolas Prost	6–7
(Switzerland) Matech Competition	Ford GT1	Ford Cammer 5.3 L V8	6	(France) Nicolas Armindo	8–10
(Germany) Young Driver AMR	Aston Martin DBR9	Aston Martin AM04 6.0 L V12	7	(Czech Republic) Tomáš Enge	All
(Germany) Young Driver AMR	Aston Martin DBR9	Aston Martin AM04 6.0 L V12	7	(United Kingdom) Darren Turner	All
(Germany) Young Driver AMR	Aston Martin DBR9	Aston Martin AM04 6.0 L V12	8	(Germany) Stefan Mücke	All
(Germany) Young Driver AMR	Aston Martin DBR9	Aston Martin AM04 6.0 L V12	8	(Denmark) Christoffer Nygaard	1–6, 8–9
(Germany) Young Driver AMR	Aston Martin DBR9	Aston Martin AM04 6.0 L V12	8	(Portugal) Pedro Lamy	7
(Germany) Young Driver AMR	Aston Martin DBR9	Aston Martin AM04 6.0 L V12	8	(Argentina) José María López	10
(France) Hexis AMR	Aston Martin DBR9	Aston Martin AM04 6.0 L V12	9	(France) Frédéric Makowiecki	All
(France) Hexis AMR	Aston Martin DBR9	Aston Martin AM04 6.0 L V12	9	(France) Philippe Dumas	1
(France) Hexis AMR	Aston Martin DBR9	Aston Martin AM04 6.0 L V12	9	(France) Thomas Accary	2, 4–5
(France) Hexis AMR	Aston Martin DBR9	Aston Martin AM04 6.0 L V12	9	(France) Stéphane Sarrazin	3
(France) Hexis AMR	Aston Martin DBR9	Aston Martin AM04 6.0 L V12	9	(France) Yann Clairay	6–10
(France) Hexis AMR	Aston Martin DBR9	Aston Martin AM04 6.0 L V12	10	(Monaco) Clivio Piccione	All
(France) Hexis AMR	Aston Martin DBR9	Aston Martin AM04 6.0 L V12	10	(Switzerland) Jonathan Hirschi	All
(Belgium) Mad-Croc Racing	Corvette C6.R	Chevrolet LS7.R 7.0 L V8	11	(Netherlands) Xavier Maassen	1–7
(Belgium) Mad-Croc Racing	Corvette C6.R	Chevrolet LS7.R 7.0 L V8	11	(Germany) Alex Müller	1
(Belgium) Mad-Croc Racing	Corvette C6.R	Chevrolet LS7.R 7.0 L V8	11	(France) Nicolas Armindo	2
(Belgium) Mad-Croc Racing	Corvette C6.R	Chevrolet LS7.R 7.0 L V8	11	(Netherlands) Mike Hezemans	3–4
(Belgium) Mad-Croc Racing	Corvette C6.R	Chevrolet LS7.R 7.0 L V8	11	(Netherlands) Jos Menten	5–6
(Belgium) Mad-Croc Racing	Corvette C6.R	Chevrolet LS7.R 7.0 L V8	11	(France) Julien Jousse	7
(Belgium) Mad-Croc Racing	Corvette C6.R	Chevrolet LS7.R 7.0 L V8	11	(Brazil) Sérgio Jimenez	9
(Belgium) Mad-Croc Racing	Corvette C6.R	Chevrolet LS7.R 7.0 L V8	11	(Brazil) Claudio Dahruj	9
(Belgium) Mad-Croc Racing	Corvette C6.R	Chevrolet LS7.R 7.0 L V8	12	(Finland) Pertti Kuismanen	All
(Belgium) Mad-Croc Racing	Corvette C6.R	Chevrolet LS7.R 7.0 L V8	12	(Finland) Mika Salo	1, 3, 6
(Belgium) Mad-Croc Racing	Corvette C6.R	Chevrolet LS7.R 7.0 L V8	12	(United Kingdom) Oliver Gavin	2, 4–5
(Belgium) Mad-Croc Racing	Corvette C6.R	Chevrolet LS7.R 7.0 L V8	12	(France) Laurent Cazenave	7
(Belgium) Mad-Croc Racing	Corvette C6.R	Chevrolet LS7.R 7.0 L V8	12	(Netherlands) Duncan Huisman	8–10
(Germany) Phoenix Racing / Carsport	Corvette C6.R	Chevrolet LS7.R 7.0 L V8	13	(Germany) Marc Hennerici	All
(Germany) Phoenix Racing / Carsport	Corvette C6.R	Chevrolet LS7.R 7.0 L V8	13	(Austria) Andreas Zuber	1–2
(Germany) Phoenix Racing / Carsport	Corvette C6.R	Chevrolet LS7.R 7.0 L V8	13	(Slovakia) Štefan Rosina	3
(Germany) Phoenix Racing / Carsport	Corvette C6.R	Chevrolet LS7.R 7.0 L V8	13	(Italy) Andrea Piccini	4
(Germany) Phoenix Racing / Carsport	Corvette C6.R	Chevrolet LS7.R 7.0 L V8	13	(Netherlands) Mike Hezemans	5
(Germany) Phoenix Racing / Carsport	Corvette C6.R	Chevrolet LS7.R 7.0 L V8	13	(Greece) Alexandros Margaritis	6–10
(Germany) Phoenix Racing / Carsport	Corvette C6.R	Chevrolet LS7.R 7.0 L V8	14	(Italy) Andrea Piccini	1, 5
(Germany) Phoenix Racing / Carsport	Corvette C6.R	Chevrolet LS7.R 7.0 L V8	14	(Netherlands) Mike Hezemans	1–2
(Germany) Phoenix Racing / Carsport	Corvette C6.R	Chevrolet LS7.R 7.0 L V8	14	(Belgium) Anthony Kumpen	2, 5
(United Kingdom) Sumo Power GT	Nissan GT-R GT1	Nissan VK56DE 5.6 L V8	22	(United Kingdom) Jamie Campbell-Walter	All
(United Kingdom) Sumo Power GT	Nissan GT-R GT1	Nissan VK56DE 5.6 L V8	22	(United Kingdom) Warren Hughes	All
(United Kingdom) Sumo Power GT	Nissan GT-R GT1	Nissan VK56DE 5.6 L V8	23	(United Kingdom) Peter Dumbreck	All
(United Kingdom) Sumo Power GT	Nissan GT-R GT1	Nissan VK56DE 5.6 L V8	23	(Germany) Michael Krumm	All
(Germany) Reiter	Lamborghini Murciélago LP 670 R-SV	Lamborghini L537 6.5 L V12	24	(Netherlands) Peter Kox	All
(Germany) Reiter	Lamborghini Murciélago LP 670 R-SV	Lamborghini L537 6.5 L V12	24	(Germany) Christopher Haase	All
(Germany) Reiter	Lamborghini Murciélago LP 670 R-SV	Lamborghini L537 6.5 L V12	25	(Brazil) Ricardo Zonta	1, 4–6, 8–9
(Germany) Reiter	Lamborghini Murciélago LP 670 R-SV	Lamborghini L537 6.5 L V12	25	(Brazil) Rafael Daniel	1, 4
(Germany) Reiter	Lamborghini Murciélago LP 670 R-SV	Lamborghini L537 6.5 L V12	25	(Netherlands) Jos Menten	2, 7
(Germany) Reiter	Lamborghini Murciélago LP 670 R-SV	Lamborghini L537 6.5 L V12	25	(Germany) Frank Kechele	2–3, 5–10
(Germany) Reiter	Lamborghini Murciélago LP 670 R-SV	Lamborghini L537 6.5 L V12	25	(Slovakia) Ján Daniš	3
(Germany) Reiter	Lamborghini Murciélago LP 670 R-SV	Lamborghini L537 6.5 L V12	25	(Brazil) Sérgio Jimenez	10
(Germany) Triple H Team Hegersport	Maserati MC12 GT1	Maserati M144B/2 6.0 L V12	33	(Germany) Altfrid Heger	1–7, 9–10
(Germany) Triple H Team Hegersport	Maserati MC12 GT1	Maserati M144B/2 6.0 L V12	33	(Greece) Alexandros Margaritis	1–4
(Germany) Triple H Team Hegersport	Maserati MC12 GT1	Maserati M144B/2 6.0 L V12	33	(Germany) Alex Müller	5–10
(Germany) Triple H Team Hegersport	Maserati MC12 GT1	Maserati M144B/2 6.0 L V12	33	(Belgium) Bert Longin	8
(Germany) Triple H Team Hegersport	Maserati MC12 GT1	Maserati M144B/2 6.0 L V12	34	(Belgium) Bert Longin	1–6
(Germany) Triple H Team Hegersport	Maserati MC12 GT1	Maserati M144B/2 6.0 L V12	34	(Italy) Matteo Bobbi	1–4
(Germany) Triple H Team Hegersport	Maserati MC12 GT1	Maserati M144B/2 6.0 L V12	34	(Belgium) Nico Verdonck	5, 8, 10
(Germany) Triple H Team Hegersport	Maserati MC12 GT1	Maserati M144B/2 6.0 L V12	34	(Italy) Alessandro Pier Guidi	6–8, 10
(Germany) Triple H Team Hegersport	Maserati MC12 GT1	Maserati M144B/2 6.0 L V12	34	(Brazil) Francisco Longo	9
(Germany) Triple H Team Hegersport	Maserati MC12 GT1	Maserati M144B/2 6.0 L V12	34	(Brazil) Daniel Serra	9
(Germany) Triple H Team Hegersport	Maserati MC12 GT1	Maserati M144B/2 6.0 L V12	34	(Austria) Nikolaus Mayr-Melnhof	7
(Germany) All-Inkl.com Münnich Motorsport	Lamborghini Murciélago LP 670 R-SV	Lamborghini L537 6.5 L V12	37	(Germany) Marc Basseng	All
(Germany) All-Inkl.com Münnich Motorsport	Lamborghini Murciélago LP 670 R-SV	Lamborghini L537 6.5 L V12	37	(Germany) Thomas Jäger	1, 3, 6
(Germany) All-Inkl.com Münnich Motorsport	Lamborghini Murciélago LP 670 R-SV	Lamborghini L537 6.5 L V12	37	(France) Christophe Bouchut	2, 4–5, 7–9
(Germany) All-Inkl.com Münnich Motorsport	Lamborghini Murciélago LP 670 R-SV	Lamborghini L537 6.5 L V12	37	(Argentina) Ricardo Risatti	10
(Germany) All-Inkl.com Münnich Motorsport	Lamborghini Murciélago LP 670 R-SV	Lamborghini L537 6.5 L V12	38	(Germany) Dominik Schwager	All
(Germany) All-Inkl.com Münnich Motorsport	Lamborghini Murciélago LP 670 R-SV	Lamborghini L537 6.5 L V12	38	(Netherlands) Nicky Pastorelli	All
(Belgium) Marc VDS Racing Team	Ford GT1	Ford Cammer 5.3 L V8	40	(Belgium) Bas Leinders	All
(Belgium) Marc VDS Racing Team	Ford GT1	Ford Cammer 5.3 L V8	40	(Belgium) Maxime Martin	All
(Belgium) Marc VDS Racing Team	Ford GT1	Ford Cammer 5.3 L V8	41	(Belgium) Renaud Kuppens	1–7
(Belgium) Marc VDS Racing Team	Ford GT1	Ford Cammer 5.3 L V8	41	(Italy) Matteo Bobbi	8–10
(Belgium) Marc VDS Racing Team	Ford GT1	Ford Cammer 5.3 L V8	41	(Finland) Markus Palttala	All

== Results and standings ==
=== Race results ===
Rnd.	Event	Qualifying Race Winner	Championship Race Winner	Report
1	Abu Dhabi	(Germany) No. 13 Phoenix Racing / Carsport	(Switzerland) No. 5 Matech Competition	Report
1	Abu Dhabi	(Germany) Marc Hennerici (Austria) Andreas Zuber	(Germany) Thomas Mutsch (Switzerland) Romain Grosjean	Report
2	Silverstone	(France) No. 9 Hexis AMR	(United Kingdom) No. 22 Sumo Power GT	Report
2	Silverstone	(France) Thomas Accary (France) Frédéric Makowiecki	(United Kingdom) Jamie Campbell-Walter (United Kingdom) Warren Hughes	Report
3	Brno	(Germany) No. 1 Vitaphone Racing Team	(Switzerland) No. 5 Matech Competition	Report
3	Brno	(Italy) Andrea Bertolini (Germany) Michael Bartels	(Germany) Thomas Mutsch (Switzerland) Romain Grosjean	Report
4	Paul Ricard	(Germany) No. 1 Vitaphone Racing Team	(Germany) No. 1 Vitaphone Racing Team	Report
4	Paul Ricard	(Italy) Andrea Bertolini (Germany) Michael Bartels	(Italy) Andrea Bertolini (Germany) Michael Bartels	Report
5	Spa-Francorchamps	(Belgium) No. 11 Mad-Croc Racing	(Germany) No. 25 Reiter	Report
5	Spa-Francorchamps	(Netherlands) Xavier Maassen (Netherlands) Jos Menten	(Brazil) Ricardo Zonta (Germany) Frank Kechele	Report
6	Nürburgring	(Germany) No. 7 Young Driver AMR	(Germany) No. 7 Young Driver AMR	Report
6	Nürburgring	(Czech Republic) Tomáš Enge (United Kingdom) Darren Turner	(Czech Republic) Tomáš Enge (United Kingdom) Darren Turner	Report
7	Algarve	(United Kingdom) No. 23 Sumo Power GT	(Germany) No. 1 Vitaphone Racing Team	Report
7	Algarve	(United Kingdom) Peter Dumbreck (Germany) Michael Krumm	(Italy) Andrea Bertolini (Germany) Michael Bartels	Report
8	Navarra	(Germany) No. 25 Reiter	(Germany) No. 25 Reiter	Report
8	Navarra	(Brazil) Ricardo Zonta (Germany) Frank Kechele	(Brazil) Ricardo Zonta (Germany) Frank Kechele	Report
9	Interlagos	(Germany) No. 7 Young Driver AMR	(Germany) No. 2 Vitaphone Racing Team	Report
9	Interlagos	(Czech Republic) Tomáš Enge (United Kingdom) Darren Turner	(Brazil) Enrique Bernoldi (Brazil) Alexandre Negrão	Report
10	San Luis	(France) No. 9 Hexis AMR	(France) No. 9 Hexis AMR	Report
10	San Luis	(France) Yann Clairay (France) Frédéric Makowiecki	(France) Yann Clairay (France) Frédéric Makowiecki	Report

=== Championships ===
Championship points were awarded for the first three positions in each qualifying race and for the first ten positions in each championship race. Entries had to complete 75% of the winning car's race distance in order to be classified and earn points. Individual drivers were required to participate for a minimum of 25 minutes in order to earn championship points in any race.

Points System
Race Type	Position									
Race Type	1st	2nd	3rd	4th	5th	6th	7th	8th	9th	10th
Qualifying Race	8	6	4	0	0	0	0	0	0	0
Championship Race	25	18	15	12	10	8	6	4	2	1

==== Drivers' Championship ====
Pos	Driver	Team	ABU (United Arab Emirates)		SIL (United Kingdom)		BRN (Czech Republic)		PRI (France)		SPA (Belgium)		NÜR (Germany)		ALG (Portugal)		NAV (Spain)		INT (Brazil)		SAN (Argentina)		Total
Pos	Driver	Team	QR	CR	QR	CR	QR	CR	QR	CR	QR	CR	QR	CR	QR	CR	QR	CR	QR	CR	QR	CR	Total
1	(Germany) Michael Bartels (Italy) Andrea Bertolini	(Germany) Vitaphone Racing Team	3	4	3	7	1	5	1	1	Ret	7	10	6	2	1	7	6	8	9	12	7	138
2	(Germany) Thomas Mutsch	(Switzerland) Matech Competition	2	1	21	Ret	6	1	7	7	6	3	6	13	5	2	10	Ret	Ret	14	2	2	119
3	(France) Frédéric Makowiecki	(France) Hexis AMR	7	Ret	1	2	8	9	11	9	Ret	5	Ret	7	10	6	9	2	15	13	1	1	105
4	(Czech Republic) Tomáš Enge (United Kingdom) Darren Turner	(Germany) Young Driver AMR	Ret	11	4	EX	2	2	10	16	10	6	1	1	4	10	Ret	4	1	2	10	15	104
5	(Germany) Marc Hennerici	(Germany) Phoenix Racing / Carsport	1	2	11	Ret	17	8	6	5	EX	13	2	3	3	3	11	8	6	3	18	12	99
6	(Germany) Frank Kechele	(Germany) Reiter			6	3	20	Ret			2	1	4	14	14	8	1	1	Ret	Ret	5	4	95
7	(Greece) Alexandros Margaritis	(Germany) Triple H Team Hegersport	5	9	NC	6	13	Ret	8	3													84
7	(Greece) Alexandros Margaritis	(Germany) Phoenix Racing / Carsport											2	3	3	3	11	8	6	3	18	12	84
8	(Brazil) Ricardo Zonta	(Germany) Reiter	10	5					13	10	2	1	4	14			1	1	Ret	Ret			75
9	(United Kingdom) Peter Dumbreck (Germany) Michael Krumm	(United Kingdom) Sumo Power GT	11	16	8	Ret	3	3	9	2	8	Ret	Ret	15	1	4	16	Ret	2	6	6	Ret	71
10	(France) Yann Clairay	(France) Hexis AMR											Ret	7	10	6	9	2	15	13	1	1	65
11	(Switzerland) Romain Grosjean	(Switzerland) Matech Competition	2	1	21	Ret	6	1	7	7	20	14											62
12	(Monaco) Clivio Piccione (Switzerland) Jonathan Hirschi	(France) Hexis AMR	8	17	2	13	9	4	17	13	13	10	5	4	16	13	EX	Ret	3	4	4	3	62
13	(United Kingdom) Richard Westbrook	(Switzerland) Matech Competition									6	3	6	13	5	2	10	Ret	Ret	14	2	2	57
14	(Belgium) Bas Leinders (Belgium) Maxime Martin	(Belgium) Marc VDS Racing Team	6	13	19	8	16	Ret	20	4	9	Ret	Ret	11	Ret	5	3	5	11	5	3	Ret	54
15	(Brazil) Enrique Bernoldi	(Germany) Vitaphone Racing Team	Ret	6	9	15	7	6	5	Ret	11	4	7	12	13	Ret	Ret	12	4	1	16	14	53
16	(United Kingdom) Warren Hughes (United Kingdom) Jamie Campbell-Walter	(United Kingdom) Sumo Power GT	13	12	5	1	21	17	3	8	19	11	16	8	9	Ret	5	3	14	Ret	13	16	52
17	(Germany) Altfrid Heger	(Germany) Triple H Team Hegersport	5	9	NC	6	13	Ret	8	3	12	2	13	20	6	9			10	10	11	9	48
18	(Netherlands) Peter Kox (Germany) Christopher Haase	(Germany) Reiter	15	8	10	Ret	DNS	DNS	2	18	7	Ret	3	2	12	7	17	Ret	9	12	Ret	10	39
19	(France) Thomas Accary	(France) Hexis AMR			1	2			11	9	Ret	5											38
20	(Germany) Stefan Mücke	(Germany) Young Driver AMR	4	Ret	Ret	5	11	Ret	Ret	20	3	Ret	9	5	15	11	DNS	DNS	12	11	Ret	5	34
21	(Portugal) Miguel Ramos	(Germany) Vitaphone Racing Team	Ret	6	9	15	7	6	5	Ret	11	4	7	12	13	Ret	Ret	12			16	14	28
22	(Netherlands) Jos Menten	(Germany) Reiter			6	3									14	8							27
22	(Netherlands) Jos Menten	(Belgium) Mad-Croc Racing									1	Ret	18	18									27
23	(Austria) Andreas Zuber	(Germany) Phoenix Racing / Carsport	1	2	11	Ret																	26
24	(Brazil) Alexandre Negrão	(Germany) Vitaphone Racing Team																	4	1			25
25	(Italy) Andrea Piccini	(Germany) Phoenix Racing / Carsport	16	3					6	5	Ret	Ret											25
26	(Germany) Alex Müller	(Belgium) Mad-Croc Racing	14	10																			24
26	(Germany) Alex Müller	(Germany) Triple H Team Hegersport									12	2	13	20	6	9	6	Ret	10	10	11	9	24
27	(Denmark) Christoffer Nygaard	(Germany) Young Driver AMR	4	Ret	Ret	5	11	Ret	Ret	20	3	Ret	9	5			DNS	DNS	12	11			24
28	(Belgium) Bert Longin	(Germany) Triple H Team Hegersport	DNS	7	16	4	10	11	14	11	4	8	Ret	9			6	Ret					24
29	(Netherlands) Mike Hezemans	(Germany) Phoenix Racing / Carsport	16	3	7	Ret					EX	13											23
29	(Netherlands) Mike Hezemans	(Belgium) Mad-Croc Racing					5	15	4	6													23
30	(Italy) Matteo Bobbi	(Germany) Triple H Team Hegersport	DNS	7	16	4	10	11	14	11													19
30	(Italy) Matteo Bobbi	(Belgium) Marc VDS Racing Team															12	10	20	15	15	Ret	19
31	(Netherlands) Xavier Maassen	(Belgium) Mad-Croc Racing	14	10	12	11	5	15	4	6	1	Ret	18	18	7	14							17
32	(Germany) Dominik Schwager (Netherlands) Nicky Pastorelli	(Germany) All-Inkl.com Münnich Motorsport	Ret	Ret	20	12	4	7	15	12	5	9	11	Ret	8	Ret	Ret	9	5	7	9	11	16
33=	(Switzerland) Neel Jani	(Switzerland) Matech Competition									20	14	8	16	20	12	4	7	7	8	17	8	14
33=	(France) Nicolas Armindo	(Belgium) Mad-Croc Racing			12	11																	14
33=	(France) Nicolas Armindo	(Switzerland) Matech Competition															4	7	7	8	17	8	14
34	(Brazil) Sérgio Jimenez	(Belgium) Mad-Croc Racing																	19	20			12
34	(Brazil) Sérgio Jimenez	(Germany) Reiter																			5	4	12
35	(Brazil) Rafael Daniel	(Germany) Reiter	10	5					13	10													11
36	(Belgium) Nico Verdonck	(Germany) Triple H Team Hegersport									4	8					2	11			8	Ret	10
37	(Argentina) José María López	(Germany) Young Driver AMR																			Ret	5	10
38	(Italy) Alessandro Pier Guidi	(Germany) Triple H Team Hegersport											Ret	9	18	19	2	11			8	Ret	8
39=	(Germany) Marc Basseng	(Germany) All-Inkl.com Münnich Motorsport	Ret	17	17	Ret	14	13	16	17	15	Ret	DNS	19	Ret	17	8	Ret	EX	EX	14	6	8
39=	(Argentina) Ricardo Risatti	(Germany) All-Inkl.com Münnich Motorsport																			14	6	8
40	(Slovakia) Štefan Rosina	(Germany) Phoenix Racing / Carsport					17	8															4
41	(France) Stéphane Sarrazin	(France) Hexis AMR					8	9															2
42=	(Sweden) Max Nilsson (Japan) Seiji Ara	(Switzerland) Swiss Racing Team	12	Ret	14	9	15	14	12	Ret	17	16	17	21	11	18	13	Ret	13	16	Ret	13	2
43=	(Austria) Karl Wendlinger (Switzerland) Henri Moser	(Switzerland) Swiss Racing Team	9	14	15	Ret	12	10	21	15	16	12	14	10	Ret	20	14	Ret	17	18	7	Ret	2
44	(Finland) Markus Palttala	(Belgium) Marc VDS Racing Team	Ret	DNS	18	10	18	15	22	14	14	15	12	17	19	15	12	10	20	15	15	Ret	2
45	(Belgium) Renaud Kuppens	(Belgium) Marc VDS Racing Team	Ret	DNS	18	10	18	15	22	14	14	15	12	17	19	15							1
46	(France) Julien Jousse	(Belgium) Mad-Croc Racing													7	14							0
47	(Belgium) Anthony Kumpen	(Germany) Phoenix Racing / Carsport			7	Ret					Ret	Ret											0
48	(France) Philippe Dumas	(France) Hexis AMR	7	Ret																			0
49	(France) Nicolas Prost	(Switzerland) Matech Competition											8	16	20	12							0
50	(France) Christophe Bouchut	(Germany) All-Inkl.com Münnich Motorsport			17	Ret			16	17	15	Ret			Ret	17	8	Ret	EX	EX			0
51	(Portugal) Pedro Lamy	(Germany) Young Driver AMR													15	11							0
52=	(Finland) Pertti Kuismanen	(Belgium) Mad-Croc Racing	Ret	15	13	14	19	12	19	19	18	17	15	23	17	16	15	Ret	18	19	DNS	DNS	0
52=	(Finland) Mika Salo	(Belgium) Mad-Croc Racing	Ret	15			19	12					15	23									0
53	(United Kingdom) Oliver Gavin	(Belgium) Mad-Croc Racing			13	14			19	19	18	17											0
54	(Germany) Thomas Jäger	(Germany) All-Inkl.com Münnich Motorsport	Ret	17			14	13					DNS	19									0
55	(Netherlands) Duncan Huisman	(Belgium) Mad-Croc Racing															15	Ret	18	19	DNS	DNS	0
56	(France) Laurent Cazenave	(Belgium) Mad-Croc Racing													17	16							0
57	(Brazil) Francisco Longo (Brazil) Daniel Serra	(Germany) Triple H Team Hegersport																	16	17			0
58	(Austria) Nikolaus Mayr-Melnhof	(Germany) Triple H Team Hegersport													18	19							0
59=	(Switzerland) Cyndie Allemann	(Switzerland) Matech Competition	DNS	DNS			22	18															0
59=	(Switzerland) Rahel Frey	(Switzerland) Matech Competition					22	18															0
60=	(Switzerland) Natacha Gachnang	(Switzerland) Matech Competition	DNS	DNS					18	Ret													0
60=	(France) Olivier Panis	(Switzerland) Matech Competition							18	Ret													0
61	(Brazil) Claudio Dahruj	(Belgium) Mad-Croc Racing																	19	20			0
62	(Slovakia) Ján Daniš	(Germany) Reiter					20	Ret															0
Pos	Driver	Team	QR	CR	QR	CR	QR	CR	QR	CR	QR	CR	QR	CR	QR	CR	QR	CR	QR	CR	QR	CR	Total
Pos	Driver	Team	ABU (United Arab Emirates)		SIL (United Kingdom)		BRN (Czech Republic)		PRI (France)		SPA (Belgium)		NÜR (Germany)		ALG (Portugal)		NAV (Spain)		INT (Brazil)		SAN (Argentina)		Total

Key
Colour	Result
Gold	Race winner
Silver	2nd place
Bronze	3rd place
Green	Points finish
Blue	Non-points finish
Blue	Non-classified finish (NC)
Purple	Did not finish (Ret)
Black	Disqualified (DSQ)
Black	Excluded (EX)
White	Did not start (DNS)
White	Race cancelled (C)
White	Withdrew (WD)
Blank	Did not participate

==== Teams' Championship ====
Prior to the Nürburgring round, Phoenix Racing / Carsport informed the FIA that they were no longer able to enter the No. 14 Corvette due to the car being returned to its private owner. Phoenix's inability to enter two cars for the remainder of the season led race stewards to deem the team to be in violation of GT1 regulations. This required the team to forfeit all points earned over the course of the season, and team points from the Nürburgring round onward would also be redistributed to other competitors finishing behind the remaining Phoenix entry. Prior to the San Luis finale, Mad-Croc also failed to maintain a two-car entry and forfeited their Teams' Championship points.

Pos	Team	Manufacturer	Car	ABU (United Arab Emirates)		SIL (United Kingdom)		BRN (Czech Republic)		PRI (France)		SPA (Belgium)		NÜR (Germany)		ALG (Portugal)		NAV (Spain)		INT (Brazil)		SAN (Argentina)		Total
Pos	Team	Manufacturer	Car	QR	CR	QR	CR	QR	CR	QR	CR	QR	CR	QR	CR	QR	CR	QR	CR	QR	CR	QR	CR	Total
1	(Germany) Vitaphone Racing Team	Maserati	1	3	4	3	7	1	5	1	1	Ret	7	10	6	2	1	7	6	8	9	12	7	195
1	(Germany) Vitaphone Racing Team	Maserati	2	Ret	6	9	15	7	6	5	Ret	11	4	7	12	13	Ret	Ret	12	4	1	16	14	195
2	(France) Hexis AMR	Aston Martin	9	7	Ret	1	2	8	9	11	9	Ret	5	Ret	7	10	6	9	2	15	13	1	1	177
2	(France) Hexis AMR	Aston Martin	10	8	17	2	13	9	4	17	13	13	10	5	4	16	13	EX	Ret	3	4	4	3	177
3	(Germany) Reiter	Lamborghini	24	15	8	10	Ret	DNS	DNS	2	18	7	Ret	3	2	12	7	17	Ret	9	12	Ret	10	155
3	(Germany) Reiter	Lamborghini	25	10	5	6	3	20	Ret	13	10	2	1	4	14	14	8	1	1	Ret	Ret	5	4	155
4	(Germany) Young Driver AMR	Aston Martin	7	Ret	11	4	EX	2	2	10	16	10	6	1	1	4	10	Ret	4	1	2	10	15	147
4	(Germany) Young Driver AMR	Aston Martin	8	4	Ret	Ret	5	11	Ret	Ret	20	3	Ret	9	5	15	11	DNS	DNS	12	11	Ret	5	147
5	(Switzerland) Matech Competition	Ford	5	2	1	21	Ret	6	1	7	7	6	3	6	13	5	2	10	Ret	Ret	14	2	2	135
5	(Switzerland) Matech Competition	Ford	6	DNS	DNS			22	18	18	Ret	20	14	8	16	20	12	4	7	7	8	17	8	135
6	(United Kingdom) Sumo Power GT	Nissan	22	13	12	5	1	21	17	3	8	19	11	16	8	9	Ret	5	3	14	Ret	13	16	130
6	(United Kingdom) Sumo Power GT	Nissan	23	11	16	8	Ret	3	3	9	2	8	Ret	Ret	15	1	4	16	Ret	2	6	6	Ret	130
7	(Germany) Triple H Team Hegersport	Maserati	33	5	9	NC	6	13	Ret	8	3	12	2	13	20	6	9	6	Ret	10	10	11	9	84
7	(Germany) Triple H Team Hegersport	Maserati	34	DNS	7	16	4	10	11	14	11	4	8	Ret	9	18	19	2	11	16	17	8	Ret	84
8	(Belgium) Marc VDS Racing Team	Ford	40	6	13	19	8	16	Ret	20	4	9	Ret	Ret	11	Ret	5	3	5	11	5	3	Ret	62
8	(Belgium) Marc VDS Racing Team	Ford	41	Ret	DNS	18	10	18	15	22	14	14	15	12	17	19	15	12	10	20	15	15	Ret	62
9	(Germany) All-Inkl.com Münnich Motorsport	Lamborghini	37	Ret	17	17	Ret	14	13	16	17	15	Ret	DNS	19	Ret	17	8	Ret	EX	EX	14	6	28
9	(Germany) All-Inkl.com Münnich Motorsport	Lamborghini	38	Ret	Ret	20	12	4	7	15	12	5	9	11	Ret	8	Ret	Ret	9	5	7	9	11	28
10	(Switzerland) Swiss Racing Team	Nissan	3	9	14	15	Ret	12	10	21	15	16	12	14	10	Ret	20	14	Ret	17	18	7	Ret	5
10	(Switzerland) Swiss Racing Team	Nissan	4	12	Ret	14	9	15	14	12	Ret	17	16	17	21	11	18	13	Ret	13	16	Ret	13	5
–	(Germany) Phoenix Racing / Carsport	Corvette	13	1	2	11	Ret	17	8	6	5	EX	13	2	3	3	3	11	8	6	3	18	12	–
–	(Germany) Phoenix Racing / Carsport	Corvette	14	16	3	7	Ret					Ret	Ret											–
–	(Belgium) Mad-Croc Racing	Corvette	11	14	10	12	11	5	15	4	6	1	Ret	18	18	7	14			19	20			–
–	(Belgium) Mad-Croc Racing	Corvette	12	Ret	15	13	14	19	12	19	19	18	17	15	23	17	16	15	Ret	18	19	DNS	DNS	–
Pos	Team	Manufacturer	Car	QR	CR	QR	CR	QR	CR	QR	CR	QR	CR	QR	CR	QR	CR	QR	CR	QR	CR	QR	CR	Total
Pos	Team	Manufacturer	Car	ABU (United Arab Emirates)		SIL (United Kingdom)		BRN (Czech Republic)		PRI (France)		SPA (Belgium)		NÜR (Germany)		ALG (Portugal)		NAV (Spain)		INT (Brazil)		SAN (Argentina)		Total

Key
Colour	Result
Gold	Race winner
Silver	2nd place
Bronze	3rd place
Green	Points finish
Blue	Non-points finish
Blue	Non-classified finish (NC)
Purple	Did not finish (Ret)
Black	Disqualified (DSQ)
Black	Excluded (EX)
White	Did not start (DNS)
White	Race cancelled (C)
White	Withdrew (WD)
Blank	Did not participate

==== SRO Trophy for Manufacturers ====
The SRO Trophy for Manufacturers was established mid-season by the SRO Group as an award for the best of the season's six manufacturers, although unlike the Drivers' and Teams' Championships it was not an official FIA championship. Rankings for the Trophy were based on the results for each car in both the Qualifying and Championship Races, with all finishing cars in points earning positions combining their points toward the manufacturer's total. Aston Martin secured the inaugural Trophy, having previously won the FIA GT Manufacturers' Cup in 2006.

Pos	Manufacturer	Points
1	(United Kingdom) Aston Martin	305
2	(Italy) Maserati	270
3	(United States) Ford	189
4	(Italy) Lamborghini	169
5	(United States) Corvette	131
6	(Japan) Nissan	127

== Bibliography ==
- Loisy, Olivier (2010). FIA GT1 World Championship + FIA GT3 + GT2 Cup: 2010 Yearbook. Paris: Apollo Publishing. ISBN 978-2952104487.
