= 2010 FIA GT1 Brno round =

The Masaryk Circuit, Brno

The FIA GT1 Brno round was an auto race held at the Masaryk Circuit, Brno, Czech Republic on 21–23 May 2010. It was the third round of the 2010 FIA GT1 World Championship season. The Brno circuit was last visited by the former FIA GT Championship in 2008. Support series for the event include the FIA GT3 European Championship, Porsche Carrera Cup Italia, and the Lamborghini Blancpain Super Trofeo.

== Qualifying ==
=== Qualifying result ===
For qualifying, Driver 1 participates in the first and third sessions while Driver 2 participates in only the second session. The fastest lap for each session is indicated with bold.

Pos	No.	Driver 1	Team	Session 1	Session 2	Session 3	Grid
Pos	No.	Driver 2	Team	Session 1	Session 2	Session 3	Grid
1	1	(Italy) Andrea Bertolini	(Germany) Vitaphone Racing Team	1:56.080	1:56.278	1:55.441	1
1	1	(Germany) Michael Bartels	(Germany) Vitaphone Racing Team	1:56.080	1:56.278	1:55.441	1
2	2	(Brazil) Enrique Bernoldi	(Germany) Vitaphone Racing Team	1:56.801	1:56.761	1:55.836	2
2	2	(Portugal) Miguel Ramos	(Germany) Vitaphone Racing Team	1:56.801	1:56.761	1:55.836	2
3	7	(Czech Republic) Tomáš Enge	(Germany) Young Driver AMR	1:56.170	1:56.883	1:56.304	3
3	7	(United Kingdom) Darren Turner	(Germany) Young Driver AMR	1:56.170	1:56.883	1:56.304	3
4	23	(Germany) Michael Krumm	(United Kingdom) Sumo Power GT	1:56.197	1:56.999	1:56.312	4
4	23	(United Kingdom) Peter Dumbreck	(United Kingdom) Sumo Power GT	1:56.197	1:56.999	1:56.312	4
5	11	(Netherlands) Xavier Maassen	(Belgium) Mad-Croc Racing	1:57.035	1:56.400	1:56.543	5
5	11	(Netherlands) Mike Hezemans	(Belgium) Mad-Croc Racing	1:57.035	1:56.400	1:56.543	5
6	38	(Netherlands) Nicky Pastorelli	(Germany) All-Inkl.com Münnich Motorsport	1:56.895	1:56.931	1:56.983	6
6	38	(Germany) Dominik Schwager	(Germany) All-Inkl.com Münnich Motorsport	1:56.895	1:56.931	1:56.983	6
7	33	(Greece) Alexandros Margaritis	(Germany) Triple H Team Hegersport	1:57.559	1:57.349	1:56.984	7
7	33	(Germany) Altfrid Heger	(Germany) Triple H Team Hegersport	1:57.559	1:57.349	1:56.984	7
8	40	(Belgium) Bas Leinders	(Belgium) Marc VDS Racing Team	1:57.373	1:57.029	No Time	8
8	40	(Belgium) Maxime Martin	(Belgium) Marc VDS Racing Team	1:57.373	1:57.029	No Time	8
9	9	(France) Frédéric Makowiecki	(France) Hexis AMR	1:56.705	1:57.385		9
9	9	(France) Stéphane Sarrazin	(France) Hexis AMR	1:56.705	1:57.385		9
10	5	(Switzerland) Romain Grosjean	(Switzerland) Matech Competition	1:56.247	1:57.474		10
10	5	(Germany) Thomas Mutsch	(Switzerland) Matech Competition	1:56.247	1:57.474		10
11	34	(Italy) Matteo Bobbi	(Germany) Triple H Team Hegersport	1:56.364	1:57.488		11
11	34	(Belgium) Bert Longin	(Germany) Triple H Team Hegersport	1:56.364	1:57.488		11
12	13	(Slovakia) Štefan Rosina	(Germany) Phoenix Racing / Carsport	1:56.700	1:58.291		12
12	13	(Germany) Marc Hennerici	(Germany) Phoenix Racing / Carsport	1:56.700	1:58.291		12
13	10	(Switzerland) Jonathan Hirschi	(France) Hexis AMR	1:57.191	1:57.686		13
13	10	(Monaco) Clivio Piccione	(France) Hexis AMR	1:57.191	1:57.686		13
14	8	(Germany) Stefan Mücke	(Germany) Young Driver AMR	1:56.365	1:57.884		14
14	8	(Denmark) Christoffer Nygaard	(Germany) Young Driver AMR	1:56.365	1:57.884		14
15	3	(Austria) Karl Wendlinger	(Switzerland) Swiss Racing Team	1:57.452	1:58.667		15
15	3	(Switzerland) Henri Moser	(Switzerland) Swiss Racing Team	1:57.452	1:58.667		15
16	12	(Finland) Pertti Kuismanen	(Belgium) Mad-Croc Racing	1:56.753	2:01.575		16
16	12	(Finland) Mika Salo	(Belgium) Mad-Croc Racing	1:56.753	2:01.575		16
17	4	(Japan) Seiji Ara	(Switzerland) Swiss Racing Team	1:57.649			17
17	4	(Sweden) Max Nilsson	(Switzerland) Swiss Racing Team	1:57.649			17
18	41	(Finland) Markus Palttala	(Belgium) Marc VDS Racing Team	1:57.778			18
18	41	(Belgium) Renaud Kuppens	(Belgium) Marc VDS Racing Team	1:57.778			18
19	24	(Netherlands) Peter Kox	(Germany) Reiter	1:57.902			19
19	24	(Germany) Christopher Haase	(Germany) Reiter	1:57.902			19
20	37	(Germany) Marc Basseng	(Germany) All-Inkl.com Münnich Motorsport	1:58.141			20
20	37	(Germany) Thomas Jäger	(Germany) All-Inkl.com Münnich Motorsport	1:58.141			20
21	22	(United Kingdom) Warren Hughes	(United Kingdom) Sumo Power GT	1:58.599			21
21	22	(United Kingdom) Jamie Campbell-Walter	(United Kingdom) Sumo Power GT	1:58.599			21
22	25	(Germany) Frank Kechele	(Germany) Reiter	1:58.658			22
22	25	(Slovakia) Jan Daniš	(Germany) Reiter	1:58.658			22
23	6	(Switzerland) Rahel Frey	(Switzerland) Matech Competition	2:00.211			23
23	6	(Switzerland) Cyndie Allemann	(Switzerland) Matech Competition	2:00.211			23

== Races ==
=== Qualifying race ===
==== Race result ====
Pos	No.	Team	Drivers	Manufacturer	Laps	Time/Retired
1	1	(Germany) Vitaphone Racing Team	(Germany) Michael Bartels (Italy) Andrea Bertolini	Maserati	30	
2	7	(Germany) Young Driver AMR	(Czech Republic) Tomáš Enge (United Kingdom) Darren Turner	Aston Martin	30	−4.608
3	23	(United Kingdom) Sumo Power GT	(United Kingdom) Peter Dumbreck (Germany) Michael Krumm	Nissan	30	−11.312
4	38	(Germany) All-Inkl.com Münnich Motorsport	(Netherlands) Nicky Pastorelli (Germany) Dominik Schwager	Lamborghini	30	−19.652
5	11	(Belgium) Mad-Croc Racing	(Netherlands) Xavier Maassen (Netherlands) Mike Hezemans	Corvette	30	−25.755
6	5	(Switzerland) Matech Competition	(Germany) Thomas Mutsch (Switzerland) Romain Grosjean	Ford	30	−26.372
7	2	(Germany) Vitaphone Racing Team	(Portugal) Miguel Ramos (Brazil) Enrique Bernoldi	Maserati	30	−26.442
8	9	(France) Hexis AMR	(France) Stéphane Sarrazin (France) Frédéric Makowiecki	Aston Martin	30	−27.388
9	10	(France) Hexis AMR	(Monaco) Clivio Piccione (Switzerland) Jonathan Hirschi	Aston Martin	30	−38.563
10	34	(Germany) Triple H Team Hegersport	(Belgium) Bert Longin (Italy) Matteo Bobbi	Maserati	30	−39.274
11	8	(Germany) Young Driver AMR	(Germany) Stefan Mücke (Denmark) Christoffer Nygaard	Aston Martin	30	−39.995
12	3	(Switzerland) Swiss Racing Team	(Austria) Karl Wendlinger (Switzerland) Henri Moser	Nissan	30	−46.564
13	33	(Germany) Triple H Team Hegersport	(Germany) Altfrid Heger (Greece) Alexandros Margaritis	Maserati	30	−47.177
14	37	(Germany) All-Inkl.com Münnich Motorsport	(Germany) Marc Basseng (Germany) Thomas Jäger	Lamborghini	30	−57.793
15	4	(Switzerland) Swiss Racing Team	(Sweden) Max Nilsson (Japan) Seiji Ara	Nissan	30	−58.160
16	40	(Belgium) Marc VDS Racing Team	(Belgium) Bas Leinders (Belgium) Maxime Martin	Ford	30	−1:20.927
17	13	(Germany) Phoenix Racing / Carsport	(Germany) Marc Hennerici (Slovakia) Štefan Rosina	Corvette	30	−1:23.343
18	41	(Belgium) Marc VDS Racing Team	(Belgium) Renaud Kuppens (Finland) Markus Palttala	Ford	30	−1:26.647
19	12	(Belgium) Mad-Croc Racing	(Finland) Pertti Kuismanen (Finland) Mika Salo	Corvette	30	−1:36.642
20	25	(Germany) Reiter	(Germany) Frank Kechele (Slovakia) Jan Daniš	Lamborghini	30	−1:40.271
21	22	(United Kingdom) Sumo Power GT	(United Kingdom) Warren Hughes (United Kingdom) Jamie Campbell-Walter	Nissan	29	−1 Lap
22	6	(Switzerland) Matech Competition	(Switzerland) Cyndie Allemann (Switzerland) Rahel Frey	Ford	29	−1 Lap
DNS	24	(Germany) Reiter	(Netherlands) Peter Kox (Germany) Christopher Haase	Lamborghini	–	Did Not Start

=== Championship race ===
==== Race result ====
Pos	No.	Team	Drivers	Manufacturer	Laps	Time/Retired
1	5	(Switzerland) Matech Competition	(Germany) Thomas Mutsch (Switzerland) Romain Grosjean	Ford	28	
2	7	(Germany) Young Driver AMR	(Czech Republic) Tomáš Enge (United Kingdom) Darren Turner	Aston Martin	28	−0.717
3	23	(United Kingdom) Sumo Power GT	(United Kingdom) Peter Dumbreck (Germany) Michael Krumm	Nissan	28	−0.966
4	10	(France) Hexis AMR	(Monaco) Clivio Piccione (Switzerland) Jonathan Hirschi	Aston Martin	28	−1.553
5	1	(Germany) Vitaphone Racing Team	(Germany) Michael Bartels (Italy) Andrea Bertolini	Maserati	28	−1.766
6	2	(Germany) Vitaphone Racing Team	(Portugal) Miguel Ramos (Brazil) Enrique Bernoldi	Maserati	28	−9.057
7	38	(Germany) All-Inkl.com Münnich Motorsport	(Netherlands) Nicky Pastorelli (Germany) Dominik Schwager	Lamborghini	28	−13.285
8	13	(Germany) Phoenix Racing / Carsport	(Germany) Marc Hennerici (Slovakia) Štefan Rosina	Corvette	28	−16.713
9	9	(France) Hexis AMR	(France) Stéphane Sarrazin (France) Frédéric Makowiecki	Aston Martin	28	−20.874
10	3	(Switzerland) Swiss Racing Team	(Austria) Karl Wendlinger (Switzerland) Henri Moser	Nissan	28	−22.662
11	34	(Germany) Triple H Team Hegersport	(Belgium) Bert Longin (Italy) Matteo Bobbi	Maserati	28	−25.676
12	12	(Belgium) Mad-Croc Racing	(Finland) Pertti Kuismanen (Finland) Mika Salo	Corvette	28	−1:06.895
13	37	(Germany) All-Inkl.com Münnich Motorsport	(Germany) Marc Basseng (Germany) Thomas Jäger	Lamborghini	28	−1:11.556
14	4	(Switzerland) Swiss Racing Team	(Sweden) Max Nilsson (Japan) Seiji Ara	Nissan	28	−1:22.331
15	41	(Belgium) Marc VDS Racing Team	(Belgium) Renaud Kuppens (Finland) Markus Palttala	Ford	28	−1:29.553
16	11	(Belgium) Mad-Croc Racing	(Netherlands) Xavier Maassen (Netherlands) Mike Hezemans	Corvette	28	−1:42.367
17	22	(United Kingdom) Sumo Power GT	(United Kingdom) Warren Hughes (United Kingdom) Jamie Campbell-Walter	Nissan	27	−1 Lap
18	6	(Switzerland) Matech Competition	(Switzerland) Cyndie Allemann (Switzerland) Rahel Frey	Ford	27	−1 Lap
19 DNF	25	(Germany) Reiter	(Germany) Frank Kechele (Czech Republic) Jan Denis	Lamborghini	20	
20 DNF	8	(Germany) Young Driver AMR	(Germany) Stefan Mücke (Denmark) Christoffer Nygaard	Aston Martin	12	
21 DNF	33	(Germany) Triple H Team Hegersport	(Germany) Altfrid Heger (Greece) Alexandros Margaritis	Maserati	8	
22 DNF	40	(Belgium) Marc VDS Racing Team	(Belgium) Bas Leinders (Belgium) Maxime Martin	Ford	8	
DNS	24	(Germany) Reiter	(Netherlands) Peter Kox (Germany) Christopher Haase	Lamborghini	–	Did Not Start

FIA GT1 World Championship
Previous race: RAC Tourist Trophy	2010 season	Next race: Paul Ricard
