= 2010 FIA GT1 Navarra round =

Layout of the Circuito de Navarra

The 2010 FIA GT1 Navarra round was an auto racing event held at the Circuito de Navarra, Los Arcos, Spain on 23–24 October 2010, and served as the eighth round of the 2010 FIA GT1 World Championship season. The eighth round of the championship had originally been scheduled to be held in Durban, South Africa, but difficulties in completing the circuit in time forced the Fédération Internationale de l'Automobile (FIA) to relocate the event to Navarra. The event shared the weekend with the Superleague Formula series.

Brazilian Ricardo Zonta and German Frank Kechele of the Reiter Lamborghini team swept the weekend, earning pole position and victories in both the Qualifying and Championship Races. Frédéric Makowiecki and Yann Clairay of Hexis Aston Martin finished the Championship Race in second, while Warren Hughes and Jamie Campbell-Walter of Sumo Power Nissan were third. Championship leaders Michael Bartels and Andrea Bertolini of Vitaphone Maserati were able to extend their points lead with a sixth-place finish.

== Qualifying ==
=== Qualifying result ===
For qualifying, Driver 1 participates in the first and third sessions while Driver 2 participates in only the second session. The fastest lap for each session is indicated with bold.

Pos	No.	Driver 1	Team	Session 1	Session 2	Session 3	Grid
Pos	No.	Driver 2	Team	Session 1	Session 2	Session 3	Grid
1	25	(Brazil) Ricardo Zonta	(Germany) Reiter	1:36.245	1:36.458	1:36.118	1
1	25	(Germany) Frank Kechele	(Germany) Reiter	1:36.245	1:36.458	1:36.118	1
2	34	(Italy) Alessandro Pier Guidi	(Germany) Triple H Team Hegersport	1:36.746	1:36.901	1:36.329	2
2	34	(Belgium) Nico Verdonck	(Germany) Triple H Team Hegersport	1:36.746	1:36.901	1:36.329	2
3	6	(Switzerland) Neel Jani	(Switzerland) Matech Competition	1:36.641	1:36.816	1:36.407	3
3	6	(France) Nicolas Armindo	(Switzerland) Matech Competition	1:36.641	1:36.816	1:36.407	3
4	40	(Belgium) Maxime Martin	(Belgium) Marc VDS Racing Team	1:35.954	1:36.833	1:36.410	4
4	40	(Belgium) Bas Leinders	(Belgium) Marc VDS Racing Team	1:35.954	1:36.833	1:36.410	4
5	7	(United Kingdom) Darren Turner	(Germany) Young Driver AMR	1:36.603	1:36.413	1:36.484	5
5	7	(Czech Republic) Tomáš Enge	(Germany) Young Driver AMR	1:36.603	1:36.413	1:36.484	5
6	24	(Netherlands) Peter Kox	(Germany) Reiter	1:36.550	1:36.523	1:36.877	6
6	24	(Germany) Christopher Haase	(Germany) Reiter	1:36.550	1:36.523	1:36.877	6
7	22	(United Kingdom) Jamie Campbell-Walter	(United Kingdom) Sumo Power GT	1:36.635	1:36.895	1:37.520	7
7	22	(United Kingdom) Warren Hughes	(United Kingdom) Sumo Power GT	1:36.635	1:36.895	1:37.520	7
8	10	(Switzerland) Jonathan Hirschi	(France) Hexis AMR	1:36.992	1:36.692	1:38.090	8
8	10	(Monaco) Clivio Piccione	(France) Hexis AMR	1:36.992	1:36.692	1:38.090	8
9	2	(Brazil) Enrique Bernoldi	(Germany) Vitaphone Racing Team	1:36.577	1:36.950		9
9	2	(Portugal) Miguel Ramos	(Germany) Vitaphone Racing Team	1:36.577	1:36.950		9
10	33	(Belgium) Bert Longin	(Germany) Triple H Team Hegersport	1:36.874	1:36.992		10
10	33	(Germany) Alex Müller	(Germany) Triple H Team Hegersport	1:36.874	1:36.992		10
11	5	(United Kingdom) Richard Westbrook	(Switzerland) Matech Competition	1:37.088	1:37.019		11
11	5	(Germany) Thomas Mutsch	(Switzerland) Matech Competition	1:37.088	1:37.019		11
12	13	(Germany) Marc Hennerici	(Germany) Phoenix Racing / Carsport	1:37.199	1:37.097		12
12	13	(Greece) Alexandros Margaritis	(Germany) Phoenix Racing / Carsport	1:37.199	1:37.097		12
13	1	(Italy) Andrea Bertolini	(Germany) Vitaphone Racing Team	1:36.750	1:37.163		13
13	1	(Germany) Michael Bartels	(Germany) Vitaphone Racing Team	1:36.750	1:37.163		13
14	37	(France) Christophe Bouchut	(Germany) All-Inkl.com Münnich Motorsport	1:36.492	1:37.231		14
14	37	(Germany) Marc Basseng	(Germany) All-Inkl.com Münnich Motorsport	1:36.492	1:37.231		14
15	9	(France) Frédéric Makowiecki	(France) Hexis AMR	1:36.597	1:37.873		15
15	9	(France) Yann Clairay	(France) Hexis AMR	1:36.597	1:37.873		15
16	3	(Austria) Karl Wendlinger	(Switzerland) Swiss Racing Team	1:36.778	1:38.537		16
16	3	(Switzerland) Henri Moser	(Switzerland) Swiss Racing Team	1:36.778	1:38.537		16
17	23	(United Kingdom) Peter Dumbreck	(United Kingdom) Sumo Power GT	1:37.381			17
17	23	(Germany) Michael Krumm	(United Kingdom) Sumo Power GT	1:37.381			17
18	4	(Japan) Seiji Ara	(Switzerland) Swiss Racing Team	1:37.493			18
18	4	(Sweden) Max Nilsson	(Switzerland) Swiss Racing Team	1:37.493			18
19	12	(Netherlands) Duncan Huisman	(Belgium) Mad-Croc Racing	1:37.730			19
19	12	(Finland) Pertti Kuismanen	(Belgium) Mad-Croc Racing	1:37.730			19
20	38	(Germany) Dominik Schwager	(Germany) All-Inkl.com Münnich Motorsport	1:38.583			20
20	38	(Netherlands) Nicky Pastorelli	(Germany) All-Inkl.com Münnich Motorsport	1:38.583			20
21	41	(Italy) Matteo Bobbi	(Belgium) Marc VDS Racing Team	No Time			21
21	41	(Finland) Markus Palttala	(Belgium) Marc VDS Racing Team	No Time			21
22	8	(Denmark) Christoffer Nygaard	(Germany) Young Driver AMR	No Time			22
22	8	(Germany) Stefan Mücke	(Germany) Young Driver AMR	No Time			22

== Qualifying Race ==
=== Race result ===
Pos	No.	Team	Drivers	Manufacturer	Laps	Time/Retired
1	25	(Germany) Reiter	(Brazil) Ricardo Zonta (Germany) Frank Kechele	Lamborghini	37	
2	34	(Germany) Triple H Team Hegersport	(Belgium) Nico Verdonck (Italy) Alessandro Pier Guidi	Maserati	37	−4.548
3	40	(Belgium) Marc VDS Racing Team	(Belgium) Bas Leinders (Belgium) Maxime Martin	Ford	37	−34.111
4	6	(Switzerland) Matech Competition	(France) Nicolas Armindo (Switzerland) Neel Jani	Ford	37	−34.243
5	22	(United Kingdom) Sumo Power GT	(United Kingdom) Warren Hughes (United Kingdom) Jamie Campbell-Walter	Nissan	37	−37.406
6	33	(Germany) Triple H Team Hegersport	(Belgium) Bert Longin (Germany) Alex Müller	Maserati	37	−42.316
7	1	(Germany) Vitaphone Racing Team	(Germany) Michael Bartels (Italy) Andrea Bertolini	Maserati	37	−50.127
8	37	(Germany) All-Inkl.com Münnich Motorsport	(Germany) Marc Basseng (France) Christophe Bouchut	Lamborghini	37	−56.593
9	9	(France) Hexis AMR	(France) Frédéric Makowiecki (France) Yann Clairay	Aston Martin	37	−1:04.704
10	5	(Switzerland) Matech Competition	(Germany) Thomas Mutsch (United Kingdom) Richard Westbrook	Ford	37	−1:07.495
11	13	(Germany) Phoenix Racing / Carsport	(Germany) Marc Hennerici (Greece) Alexandros Margaritis	Corvette	37	−1:21.127
12	41	(Belgium) Marc VDS Racing Team	(Italy) Matteo Bobbi (Finland) Markus Palttala	Ford	37	−1:22.663
13	4	(Switzerland) Swiss Racing Team	(Sweden) Max Nilsson (Japan) Seiji Ara	Nissan	37	−1:25.128
14	3	(Switzerland) Swiss Racing Team	(Austria) Karl Wendlinger (Switzerland) Henri Moser	Nissan	36	−1 Lap
15	12	(Belgium) Mad-Croc Racing	(Finland) Pertti Kuismanen (Netherlands) Duncan Huisman	Corvette	36	−1 Lap
16	23	(United Kingdom) Sumo Power GT	(United Kingdom) Peter Dumbreck (Germany) Michael Krumm	Nissan	35	−2 Laps
17	24	(Germany) Reiter	(Netherlands) Peter Kox (Germany) Christopher Haase	Lamborghini	33	−4 Laps
18 DNF	38	(Germany) All-Inkl.com Münnich Motorsport	(Netherlands) Nicky Pastorelli (Germany) Dominik Schwager	Lamborghini	13	Retired
19 DNF	7	(Germany) Young Driver AMR	(Czech Republic) Tomáš Enge (United Kingdom) Darren Turner	Aston Martin	6	Driveshaft
DSQ	2	(Germany) Vitaphone Racing Team	(Portugal) Miguel Ramos (Brazil) Enrique Bernoldi	Maserati	5	Disqualified
EX	10	(France) Hexis AMR	(Monaco) Clivio Piccione (Switzerland) Jonathan Hirschi	Aston Martin	6	Excluded
DNS	8	(Germany) Young Driver AMR	(Germany) Stefan Mücke (Denmark) Christoffer Nygaard	Aston Martin	–	Did Not Start

== Championship Race ==
=== Race result ===
Pos	No.	Team	Drivers	Manufacturer	Laps	Time/Retired
1	25	(Germany) Reiter	(Brazil) Ricardo Zonta (Germany) Frank Kechele	Lamborghini	37	
2	9	(France) Hexis AMR	(France) Frédéric Makowiecki (France) Yann Clairay	Aston Martin	37	−11.897
3	22	(United Kingdom) Sumo Power GT	(United Kingdom) Warren Hughes (United Kingdom) Jamie Campbell-Walter	Nissan	37	−12.352
4	7	(Germany) Young Driver AMR	(Czech Republic) Tomáš Enge (United Kingdom) Darren Turner	Aston Martin	37	−12.968
5	40	(Belgium) Marc VDS Racing Team	(Belgium) Bas Leinders (Belgium) Maxime Martin	Ford	37	−36.026
6	1	(Germany) Vitaphone Racing Team	(Germany) Michael Bartels (Italy) Andrea Bertolini	Maserati	37	−40.311
7	6	(Switzerland) Matech Competition	(France) Nicolas Armindo (Switzerland) Neel Jani	Ford	37	−51.023
8	13	(Germany) Phoenix Racing / Carsport	(Germany) Marc Hennerici (Greece) Alexandros Margaritis	Corvette	37	−1:00.070
9	38	(Germany) All-Inkl.com Münnich Motorsport	(Netherlands) Nicky Pastorelli (Germany) Dominik Schwager	Lamborghini	37	−1:00.362
10	41	(Belgium) Marc VDS Racing Team	(Italy) Matteo Bobbi (Finland) Markus Palttala	Ford	37	−1:13.267
11	34	(Germany) Triple H Team Hegersport	(Belgium) Nico Verdonck (Italy) Alessandro Pier Guidi	Maserati	37	−1:19.405
12	2	(Germany) Vitaphone Racing Team	(Portugal) Miguel Ramos (Brazil) Enrique Bernoldi	Maserati	37	−1:20.589
13 DNF	5	(Switzerland) Matech Competition	(Germany) Thomas Mutsch (United Kingdom) Richard Westbrook	Ford	21	Damage
14 DNF	23	(United Kingdom) Sumo Power GT	(United Kingdom) Peter Dumbreck (Germany) Michael Krumm	Nissan	6	Damage
15 DNF	37	(Germany) All-Inkl.com Münnich Motorsport	(Germany) Marc Basseng (France) Christophe Bouchut	Lamborghini	5	Retired
16 DNF	4	(Switzerland) Swiss Racing Team	(Sweden) Max Nilsson (Japan) Seiji Ara	Nissan	1	Damage
17 DNF	3	(Switzerland) Swiss Racing Team	(Austria) Karl Wendlinger (Switzerland) Henri Moser	Nissan	0	Collision
18 DNF	10	(France) Hexis AMR	(Monaco) Clivio Piccione (Switzerland) Jonathan Hirschi	Aston Martin	0	Collision
19 DNF	12	(Belgium) Mad-Croc Racing	(Finland) Pertti Kuismanen (Netherlands) Duncan Huisman	Corvette	0	Collision
20 DNF	24	(Germany) Reiter	(Netherlands) Peter Kox (Germany) Christopher Haase	Lamborghini	0	Collision
21 DNF	33	(Germany) Triple H Team Hegersport	(Belgium) Bert Longin (Germany) Alex Müller	Maserati	0	Collision
DNS	8	(Germany) Young Driver AMR	(Germany) Stefan Mücke (Denmark) Christoffer Nygaard	Aston Martin	–	Did Not Start

FIA GT1 World Championship
Previous race: Algarve	2010 season	Next race: Interlagos
