= 2010 FIA GT1 Nürburgring round =

Auto racing event in Germany

Nürburgring

The 2010 FIA GT1 Nürburgring round was an auto racing event held at the Nürburgring Grand Prix circuit, Nürburg, Germany on 27–29 August 2010. It served as the sixth round of the 2010 FIA GT1 World Championship season and was supported by several series including the GT4 European Cup, ADAC GT Masters, and ATS Formel 3 Cup.

Darren Turner and Tomáš Enge of Young Driver Aston Martin swept the weekend, earning pole position in qualifying and winning both the Qualifying Race and Championship Race.

== Qualifying ==
Teammates Darren Turner and Tomáš Enge each led one of the three qualifying sessions as the No. 7 Young Driver AMR Aston Martin earned pole position in the final session by over 0.4 seconds ahead of the No. 24 Reiter Lamborghini. Championship leaders Michael Bartels and Andrea Bertolini of the Vitaphone Racing Team qualified fifth.

=== Qualifying result ===
For qualifying, Driver 1 participates in the first and third sessions while Driver 2 participates in only the second session. The fastest lap for each session is indicated with bold. Note that four cars were penalised for using excessive sections of runoff outside the circuit during qualifying. Stewards demoted the No. 3 Swiss Racing, No. 8 Young Driver, No. 34 Hegersport, and No. 38 Münnich entries three grid positions.

Pos	No.	Driver 1	Team	Session 1	Session 2	Session 3	Grid
Pos	No.	Driver 2	Team	Session 1	Session 2	Session 3	Grid
1	7	(United Kingdom) Darren Turner	(Germany) Young Driver AMR	1:57.479	1:57.182	1:57.155	1
1	7	(Czech Republic) Tomáš Enge	(Germany) Young Driver AMR	1:57.479	1:57.182	1:57.155	1
2	24	(Netherlands) Peter Kox	(Germany) Reiter	1:58.402	1:57.792	1:57.596	2
2	24	(Germany) Christopher Haase	(Germany) Reiter	1:58.402	1:57.792	1:57.596	2
3	38	(Germany) Dominik Schwager	(Germany) All-Inkl.com Münnich Motorsport	1:57.888	1:57.904	1:57.858	6
3	38	(Netherlands) Nicky Pastorelli	(Germany) All-Inkl.com Münnich Motorsport	1:57.888	1:57.904	1:57.858	6
4	13	(Germany) Marc Hennerici	(Germany) Phoenix Racing / Carsport	1:57.742	1:57.764	1:57.916	3
4	13	(Greece) Alexandros Margaritis	(Germany) Phoenix Racing / Carsport	1:57.742	1:57.764	1:57.916	3
5	1	(Italy) Andrea Bertolini	(Germany) Vitaphone Racing Team	1:58.571	1:57.793	1:58.467	4
5	1	(Germany) Michael Bartels	(Germany) Vitaphone Racing Team	1:58.571	1:57.793	1:58.467	4
6	34	(Belgium) Bert Longin	(Germany) Triple H Team Hegersport	1:58.638	1:57.780	1:57.688	9
6	34	(Italy) Alessandro Pier Guidi	(Germany) Triple H Team Hegersport	1:58.638	1:57.780	1:57.688	9
7	25	(Brazil) Ricardo Zonta	(Germany) Reiter	1:58.558	1:57.737	1:59.011	5
7	25	(Germany) Frank Kechele	(Germany) Reiter	1:58.558	1:57.737	1:59.011	5
8	8	(Denmark) Christoffer Nygaard	(Germany) Young Driver AMR	1:58.552	1:57.292	No Time	11
8	8	(Germany) Stefan Mücke	(Germany) Young Driver AMR	1:58.552	1:57.292	No Time	11
9	23	(Germany) Michael Krumm	(United Kingdom) Sumo Power GT	1:57.822	1:57.991		7
9	23	(United Kingdom) Peter Dumbreck	(United Kingdom) Sumo Power GT	1:57.822	1:57.991		7
10	11	(Netherlands) Xavier Maassen	(Belgium) Mad-Croc Racing	1:57.834	1:58.047		8
10	11	(Netherlands) Jos Menten	(Belgium) Mad-Croc Racing	1:57.834	1:58.047		8
11	6	(France) Nicolas Prost	(Switzerland) Matech Competition	1:58.743	1:58.253		10
11	6	(Switzerland) Neel Jani	(Switzerland) Matech Competition	1:58.743	1:58.253		10
12	10	(Monaco) Clivio Piccione	(France) Hexis AMR	1:58.107	1:58.523		12
12	10	(Switzerland) Jonathan Hirschi	(France) Hexis AMR	1:58.107	1:58.523		12
13	9	(France) Yann Clairay	(France) Hexis AMR	1:57.171	1:58.642		13
13	9	(France) Frédéric Makowiecki	(France) Hexis AMR	1:57.171	1:58.642		13
14	3	(Austria) Karl Wendlinger	(Switzerland) Swiss Racing Team	1:58.226	1:59.086		16
14	3	(Switzerland) Henri Moser	(Switzerland) Swiss Racing Team	1:58.226	1:59.086		16
15	37	(Germany) Marc Basseng	(Germany) All-Inkl.com Münnich Motorsport	1:57.933	1:59.430		14
15	37	(Germany) Thomas Jäger	(Germany) All-Inkl.com Münnich Motorsport	1:57.933	1:59.430		14
16	40	(Belgium) Maxime Martin	(Belgium) Marc VDS Racing Team	1:58.312	1:59.606		15
16	40	(Belgium) Bas Leinders	(Belgium) Marc VDS Racing Team	1:58.312	1:59.606		15
17	4	(Japan) Seiji Ara	(Switzerland) Swiss Racing Team	1:59.008			17
17	4	(Sweden) Max Nilsson	(Switzerland) Swiss Racing Team	1:59.008			17
18	2	(Portugal) Miguel Ramos	(Germany) Vitaphone Racing Team	1:59.037			18
18	2	(Brazil) Enrique Bernoldi	(Germany) Vitaphone Racing Team	1:59.037			18
19	22	(United Kingdom) Warren Hughes	(United Kingdom) Sumo Power GT	1:59.094			19
19	22	(United Kingdom) Jamie Campbell-Walter	(United Kingdom) Sumo Power GT	1:59.094			19
20	33	(Germany) Altfrid Heger	(Germany) Triple H Team Hegersport	1:59.128			20
20	33	(Germany) Alex Müller	(Germany) Triple H Team Hegersport	1:59.128			20
21	12	(Finland) Mika Salo	(Belgium) Mad-Croc Racing	1:59.202			21
21	12	(Finland) Pertti Kuismanen	(Belgium) Mad-Croc Racing	1:59.202			21
22	5	(Germany) Thomas Mutsch	(Switzerland) Matech Competition	1:59.211			22
22	5	(United Kingdom) Richard Westbrook	(Switzerland) Matech Competition	1:59.211			22
23	41	(Belgium) Renaud Kuppens	(Belgium) Marc VDS Racing Team	1:59.300			23
23	41	(Finland) Markus Palttala	(Belgium) Marc VDS Racing Team	1:59.300			23

== Races ==
=== Qualifying Race ===
==== Race result ====
Pos	No.	Team	Drivers	Manufacturer	Laps	Time/Retired
1	7	(Germany) Young Driver AMR	(Czech Republic) Tomáš Enge (United Kingdom) Darren Turner	Aston Martin	28	
2	13	(Germany) Phoenix Racing / Carsport	(Germany) Marc Hennerici (Greece) Alexandros Margaritis	Corvette	28	−10.356
3	24	(Germany) Reiter	(Netherlands) Peter Kox (Germany) Christopher Haase	Lamborghini	28	−20.342
4	25	(Germany) Reiter	(Brazil) Ricardo Zonta (Germany) Frank Kechele	Lamborghini	28	−32.077
5	10	(France) Hexis AMR	(Monaco) Clivio Piccione (Switzerland) Jonathan Hirschi	Aston Martin	28	−36.317
6	5	(Switzerland) Matech Competition	(Germany) Thomas Mutsch (United Kingdom) Richard Westbrook	Ford	28	−47.167
7	2	(Germany) Vitaphone Racing Team	(Portugal) Miguel Ramos (Brazil) Enrique Bernoldi	Maserati	28	−52.861
8	6	(Switzerland) Matech Competition	(France) Nicolas Prost (Switzerland) Neel Jani	Ford	28	−58.076
9	8	(Germany) Young Driver AMR	(Germany) Stefan Mücke (Denmark) Christoffer Nygaard	Aston Martin	28	−58.793
10	1	(Germany) Vitaphone Racing Team	(Germany) Michael Bartels (Italy) Andrea Bertolini	Maserati	28	−1:15.659
11	38	(Germany) All-Inkl.com Münnich Motorsport	(Netherlands) Nicky Pastorelli (Germany) Dominik Schwager	Lamborghini	28	−1:19.473
12	41	(Belgium) Marc VDS Racing Team	(Belgium) Renaud Kuppens (Finland) Markus Palttala	Ford	28	−1:21.675
13	33	(Germany) Triple H Team Hegersport	(Germany) Altfrid Heger (Germany) Alex Müller	Maserati	28	−1:41.826
14	3	(Switzerland) Swiss Racing Team	(Austria) Karl Wendlinger (Switzerland) Henri Moser	Nissan	28	−1:51.267
15	12	(Belgium) Mad-Croc Racing	(Finland) Pertti Kuismanen (Finland) Mika Salo	Corvette	28	−1:51.801
16	22	(United Kingdom) Sumo Power GT	(United Kingdom) Warren Hughes (United Kingdom) Jamie Campbell-Walter	Nissan	28	−1:55.947
17	4	(Switzerland) Swiss Racing Team	(Sweden) Max Nilsson (Japan) Seiji Ara	Nissan	27	−1 Lap
18	11	(Belgium) Mad-Croc Racing	(Netherlands) Xavier Maassen (Netherlands) Jos Menten	Corvette	24	−4 Laps
19 DNF	40	(Belgium) Marc VDS Racing Team	(Belgium) Bas Leinders (Belgium) Maxime Martin	Ford	5	Damage
20 DNF	23	(United Kingdom) Sumo Power GT	(United Kingdom) Peter Dumbreck (Germany) Michael Krumm	Nissan	1	Damage
21 DNF	34	(Germany) Triple H Team Hegersport	(Belgium) Bert Longin (Italy) Alessandro Pier Guidi	Maserati	0	Collision
22 DNF	9	(France) Hexis AMR	(France) Frédéric Makowiecki (France) Yann Clairay	Aston Martin	0	Collision
DNS	37	(Germany) All-Inkl.com Münnich Motorsport	(Germany) Marc Basseng (Germany) Thomas Jäger	Lamborghini	–	Did Not Start

=== Championship Race ===
==== Race result ====
Pos	No.	Team	Drivers	Manufacturer	Laps	Time/Retired
1	7	(Germany) Young Driver AMR	(Czech Republic) Tomáš Enge (United Kingdom) Darren Turner	Aston Martin	30	
2	24	(Germany) Reiter	(Netherlands) Peter Kox (Germany) Christopher Haase	Lamborghini	30	−9.547
3	13	(Germany) Phoenix Racing / Carsport	(Germany) Marc Hennerici (Greece) Alexandros Margaritis	Corvette	30	−13.018
4	10	(France) Hexis AMR	(Monaco) Clivio Piccione (Switzerland) Jonathan Hirschi	Aston Martin	30	−14.182
5	8	(Germany) Young Driver AMR	(Germany) Stefan Mücke (Denmark) Christoffer Nygaard	Aston Martin	30	−15.109
6	1	(Germany) Vitaphone Racing Team	(Germany) Michael Bartels (Italy) Andrea Bertolini	Maserati	30	−16.492
7	9	(France) Hexis AMR	(France) Frédéric Makowiecki (France) Yann Clairay	Aston Martin	30	−19.925
8	22	(United Kingdom) Sumo Power GT	(United Kingdom) Warren Hughes (United Kingdom) Jamie Campbell-Walter	Nissan	30	−24.834
9	34	(Germany) Triple H Team Hegersport	(Belgium) Bert Longin (Italy) Alessandro Pier Guidi	Maserati	30	−25.098
10	3	(Switzerland) Swiss Racing Team	(Austria) Karl Wendlinger (Switzerland) Henri Moser	Nissan	30	−40.434
11	40	(Belgium) Marc VDS Racing Team	(Belgium) Bas Leinders (Belgium) Maxime Martin	Ford	30	−45.444
12	2	(Germany) Vitaphone Racing Team	(Portugal) Miguel Ramos (Brazil) Enrique Bernoldi	Maserati	30	−47.591
13	5	(Switzerland) Matech Competition	(Germany) Thomas Mutsch (United Kingdom) Richard Westbrook	Ford	30	−48.833
14	25	(Germany) Reiter	(Brazil) Ricardo Zonta (Germany) Frank Kechele	Lamborghini	30	−50.806
15	23	(United Kingdom) Sumo Power GT	(United Kingdom) Peter Dumbreck (Germany) Michael Krumm	Nissan	30	−56.250
16	6	(Switzerland) Matech Competition	(France) Nicolas Prost (Switzerland) Neel Jani	Ford	30	−57.773
17	41	(Belgium) Marc VDS Racing Team	(Belgium) Renaud Kuppens (Finland) Markus Palttala	Ford	30	−1:05.491
18	11	(Belgium) Mad-Croc Racing	(Netherlands) Xavier Maassen (Netherlands) Jos Menten	Corvette	30	−1:06.014
19	37	(Germany) All-Inkl.com Münnich Motorsport	(Germany) Marc Basseng (Germany) Thomas Jäger	Lamborghini	30	−1:06.505
20	33	(Germany) Triple H Team Hegersport	(Germany) Altfrid Heger (Germany) Alex Müller	Maserati	30	−1:07.079
21	4	(Switzerland) Swiss Racing Team	(Sweden) Max Nilsson (Japan) Seiji Ara	Nissan	30	−1:51.668
22 DNF	38	(Germany) All-Inkl.com Münnich Motorsport	(Netherlands) Nicky Pastorelli (Germany) Dominik Schwager	Lamborghini	26	Crash
23	12	(Belgium) Mad-Croc Racing	(Finland) Pertti Kuismanen (Finland) Mika Salo	Corvette	25	−5 Laps

FIA GT1 World Championship
Previous race: Spa-Francorchamps	2010 season	Next race: Algarve
