= Thomas Mutsch =

German racing driver

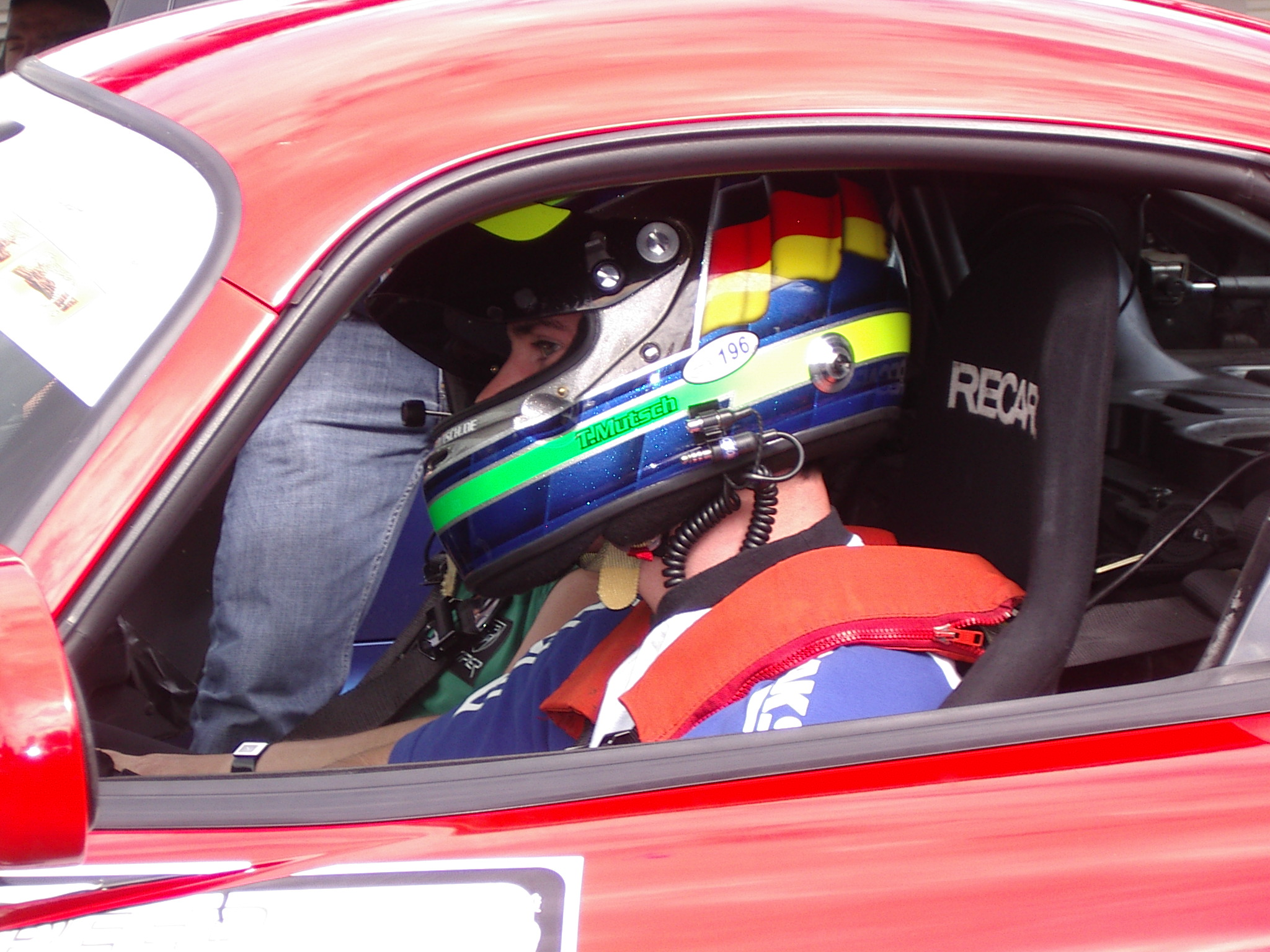
- Nationality: (Germany) German
- Born: 2 May 1979 (age 47) Trier (Germany)

FIA GT1 World Championship career
- Debut season: 2010
- Current team: Matech Competition
- Categorisation: FIA Gold (until 2014); FIA Silver (2018–)
- Car number: 5
- Starts: 20
- Wins: 2
- Poles: 0
- Fastest laps: 1
- Best finish: 2nd in 2010

Previous series
- 2009 2007-09 2004 2001-03 1998-2000 1997: FIA GT Championship; FIA GT3; BRL V6; V8Star Series; German F3; German Formula Renault

Thomas Mutsch (born 2 April 1979) is a German racecar driver.

His first success was a third place in the 1993 German karting championship. Two years later, in 1995, Mutsch finished second in the Formula Renault 1800. In 1999, Mutsch reached second place in the Marlboro Masters of Formula 3, behind Briton Marc Hynes. He now competes in FIA GT and the FIA GT3 championship, driving for the Matech Ford Team in a Ford GT in both series.

== Racing record ==
=== Complete GT1 World Championship results ===
Year	Team	Car	1	2	3	4	5	6	7	8	9	10	11	12	13	14	15	16	17	18	19	20	Pos	Points
2010	Matech Competition	Ford	ABU; QR; 2	ABU; CR; 1	SIL; QR; 21	SIL; CR; Ret	BRN; QR; 6	BRN; CR; 1	PRI; QR; 7	PRI; CR; 7	SPA; QR; 6	SPA; CR; 3	NÜR; QR; 6	NÜR; CR; 13	ALG; QR; 5	ALG; CR; 2	NAV; QR; 10	NAV; CR; Ret	INT; QR; Ret	INT; CR; 14	SAN; QR; 2	SAN; CR; 2	2nd	119

=== 24 Hours of Le Mans results ===
Year	Team	Co-Drivers	Car	Class	Laps	Pos.	Class Pos.
2010	(Switzerland) Matech Competition	(Switzerland) Romain Grosjean (Switzerland) Jonathan Hirschi	Ford GT1	GT1	171	DNF	DNF
