= Mad-Croc Racing =

Auto racing team

(Belgium) Mad-Croc Racing
- Founded: 2010
- Folded: 2011
- Team principal(s): Patrick Selleslagh
- Former series: FIA GT1 World Championship

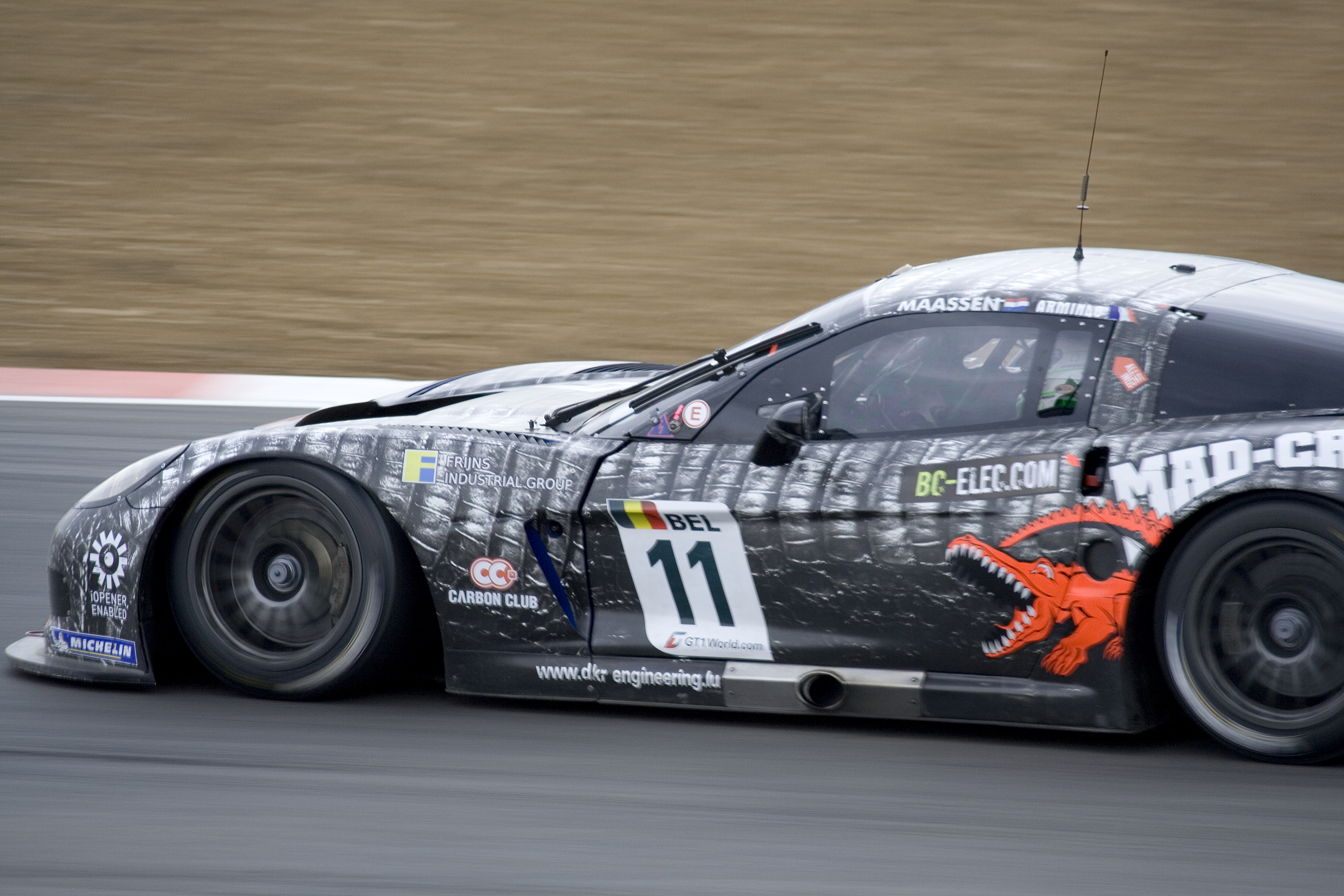
A Mad-Croc Corvette C6.R competing in the 2010 FIA GT1 World Championship

Mad-Croc Racing was an auto racing team that competed in the FIA GT1 World Championship. It was formed as the result of a collaboration between the Belgian Selleslagh Racing Team (SRT) and DKR Engineering of Luxembourg. The team took its name from the Mad-Croc brand of energy products that sponsored the team. The team ran a pair of Corvette C6.Rs in the championship, with SRT and DKR taking responsibility for one car each. In 2022 it was announced that the team will be partnering with AAS Motorsport in a customer entry of a Bentley Continental GT3.

== Racing record ==
=== Complete FIA GT1 World Championship results ===
(key) (Results in bold indicate pole position) (Results in italics indicate fastest lap)

Year	Team	Car	Engine	No.	Drivers	(United Arab Emirates) R1		(United Kingdom) R2		(Czech Republic) R3		(France) R4		(Belgium) R5		(Germany) R6		(Portugal) R7		(Spain) R8		(Brazil) R9		(Argentina) R10		Pos.	Pts.
Year	Team	Car	Engine	No.	Drivers	QR	CR	QR	CR	QR	CR	QR	CR	QR	CR	QR	CR	QR	CR	QR	CR	QR	CR	QR	CR	Pos.	Pts.
2010	(Luxembourg) Mad-Croc Racing	Chevrolet Corvette C6.R	Chevrolet LS7.R 7.0 L V8	11	(Netherlands) Xavier Maassen (Rounds 1–7, 9–10) (Germany) Alex Müller (Round 1) (France) Nicolas Armindo (Round 2) (Netherlands) Mike Hezemans (Rounds 3–4) (Netherlands) Jos Menten (Rounds 5–6) (France) Julien Jousse (Round 7) (Austria) Andreas Zuber (Round 8) (Belgium) Laurens Vanthoor (Round 8) (Brazil) Sérgio Jimenez (Rounds 9–10) (Brazil) Claudio Dahruj (Round 9) (Argentina) Ricardo Risatti (Round 10)	ABU; 14	ABU; 10	SIL; 12	SIL; 11	BRN; 16	BRN; 13	PRI; 15	PRI; 14	SPA; **1**	SPA; Ret	NÜR; 18	NÜR; 18	ALG; 19	ALG; 11	NAV; 5	NAV; 4	INT; 19	INT; 20	SAN; 7	SAN; 10	**11th**	**17**
2010	(Luxembourg) Mad-Croc Racing	Chevrolet Corvette C6.R	Chevrolet LS7.R 7.0 L V8	12	(Finland) Pertti Kuismanen (Rounds 1–10) (Finland) Mika Salo (Rounds 1, 3, 6) (United Kingdom) Oliver Gavin (Rounds 2, 4–5) (France) Laurent Cazenave (Round 7) (Netherlands) Duncan Huisman (Rounds 8–10)	ABU; Ret	ABU; 15	SIL; 13	SIL; 14	BRN; 15	BRN; Ret	PRI; 18	PRI; 19	SPA; 19	SPA; 15	NÜR; 21	NÜR; 16	ALG; 20	ALG; 14	NAV; 20	NAV; Ret	INT; 21	INT; 18	SAN; 18	SAN; Ret	**11th**	**17**
