= Hegersport =

German racing company

(Germany) Hegersport
- Founded: 2000
- Team principal(s): Altfrid Heger; Christof Maischak
- Former series: FIA GT1 World Championship

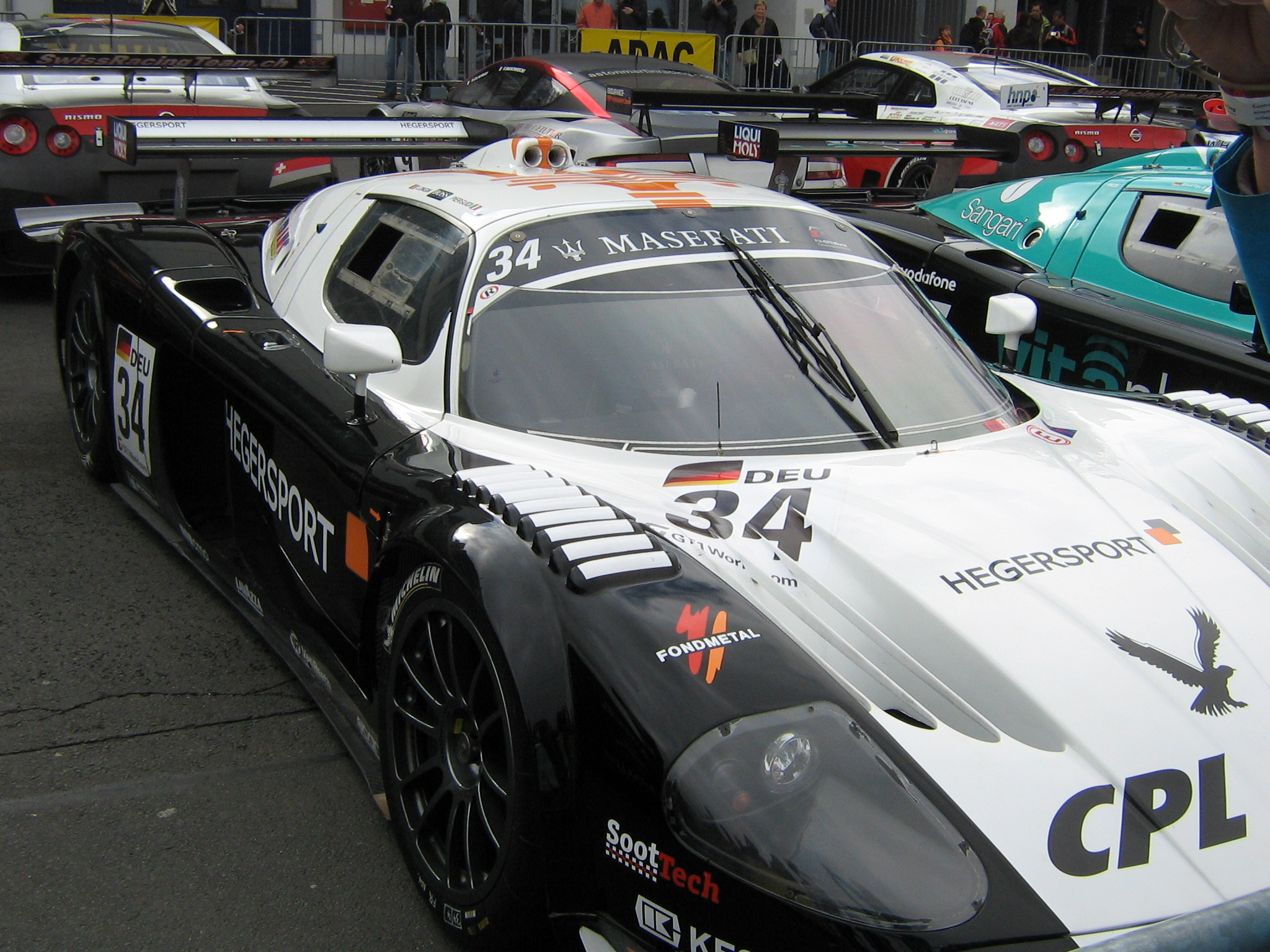
One of two Hegersport Maserati MC12s

Hegersport GmbH is a German auto racing company which organizes German Porsche Sports Cup series, and also a racing team which competed in the FIA GT1 World Championship under the title Triple H Team Hegersport. The company was formed in 2000 by racing drivers Altfrid Heger and Christof Maischak in Essen, Germany.It originally organized the V8Star Series for touring cars in Germany and across Europe. Following the end of the V8Stars series in 2004, Hegersport coordinated with Porsche Germany to establish the Sports Cup series, a national series for Porsche drivers. Hegersport also serves as a private customer event organizer, and provides training and safety courses for individuals.

In 2010 Hegersport became one of two teams nominated to represent Maserati in the inaugural FIA GT1 World Championship. Altfrid Heger resumed driving duties as part of the team, joined by such drivers as former FIA GT Champion Matteo Bobbi and successful sports car drivers Bert Longin and Alex Müller.
