= 2010 FIA GT1 Paul Ricard round =

Circuit Paul Ricard (1C-V2)

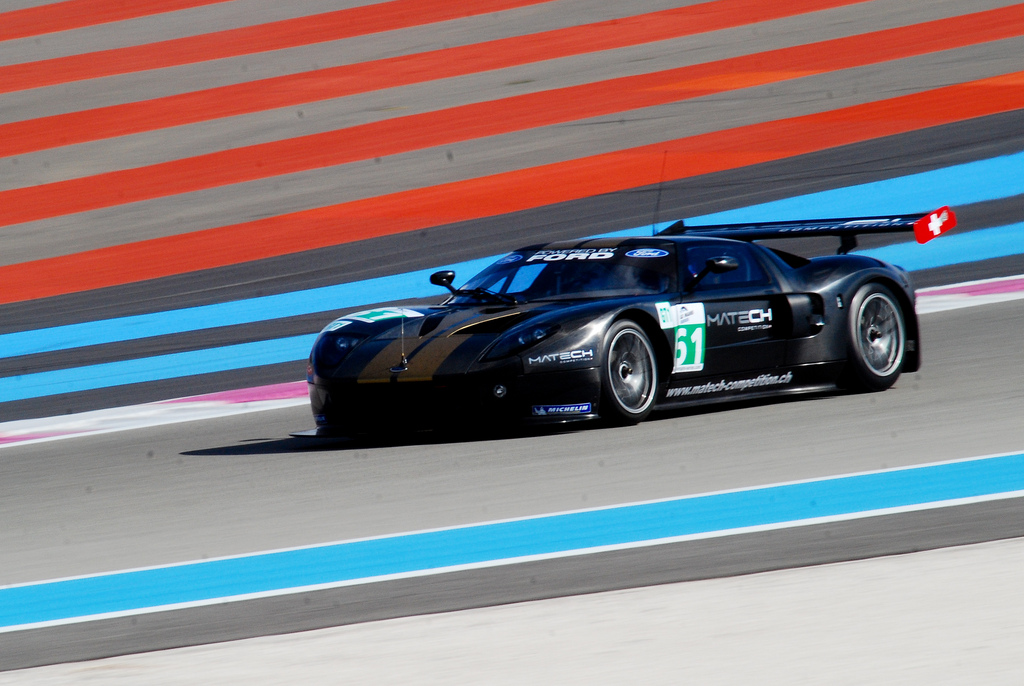
A Matech Ford GT1 testing at Paul Ricard prior to the 2010 season

The 2010 FIA GT1 Paul Ricard round was an auto racing event held at the Paul Ricard HTTT, Le Castellet, France on 2–4 June. The Paul Ricard event was the fourth round of the 2010 FIA GT1 World Championship season. The 5.81 km (3.61 mi) circuit had previously been utilized by the FIA as a test circuit for all manufacturers as part of FIA GT1's balance of performance, and was also used by the FIA GT Championship in 2009. Support series for the event include the FIA GT3 European Championship, the GT4 European Cup, and the Lamborghini Blancpain Super Trofeo.

== Background ==
Success Ballast
Entry	Ballast
No. 5 Matech Competition	40 kg (88 lb)
No. 7 Young Driver AMR	30 kg (66 lb)
No. 13 Phoenix Racing / Carsport	20 kg (44 lb)
No. 23 Sumo Power GT	20 kg (44 lb)

After three rounds of the championship, Romain Grosjean and Thomas Mutsch of Matech once again lead the Drivers Championship for the first time since their victory in Abu Dhabi to start the season. Grosjean and Mutsch lead the Vitaphone pair of Michael Bartels and Andrea Bertolini by twelve points. In the Teams Championship however it is Vitaphone who are on top but are carrying only a four-point margin over Matech. Also, following a fire at Silverstone, Phoenix is once again down to a single Corvette, reducing the series grid to 23. Defending GT1 class race winner Enrique Bernoldi, who won the 2009 FIA GT event in a Corvette, is also part of the 2010 field with Vitaphone Maserati.

Following the previous round in Brno, performance balancing modifications were published by the FIA which affected four manufacturers. The affected four, Corvette, Maserati, Ford, and Aston Martin, all had weight added to their minimum requirement in order to retard their performance potential, with Maserati having the most dramatic change with 55 kg (121 lb) added to their minimum. Further, the Fords also had their air restrictors reduced in size in order to decrease engine power. In addition to performance balancing weight additions, four teams had success ballast further added following their performances at the Brno round. Brno Championship Racing winners Romain Grosjean and Thomas Mutsch in the No. 5 Matech Ford will carry 40 kg (88 lb) of ballast for the second time this season, while the No. 7 Young Driver Aston Martin, No. 13 Phoenix Corvette, and No. 23 Sumo Power Nissan are also carrying with ballast.

== Qualifying ==
Vitaphone Maserati drivers Michael Bartels and Andrea Bertolini earned their second consecutive pole position in FIA GT1 by setting a lap time over half a second faster than any other competitor in the third qualifying session. Peter Kox and Christopher Haase gave Lamborghini their first front row start in FIA GT1 by taking second.

=== Qualifying result ===
For qualifying, Driver 1 participates in the first and third sessions while Driver 2 participates in only the second session. The fastest lap for each session is indicated with bold.

Pos	No.	Driver 1	Team	Session 1	Session 2	Session 3	Grid
Pos	No.	Driver 2	Team	Session 1	Session 2	Session 3	Grid
1	1	(Italy) Andrea Bertolini	(Germany) Vitaphone Racing Team	2:04.189	2:04.469	2:03.511	1
1	1	(Germany) Michael Bartels	(Germany) Vitaphone Racing Team	2:04.189	2:04.469	2:03.511	1
2	24	(Netherlands) Peter Kox	(Germany) Reiter	2:04.729	2:05.098	2:04.028	2
2	24	(Germany) Christopher Haase	(Germany) Reiter	2:04.729	2:05.098	2:04.028	2
3	23	(Germany) Michael Krumm	(United Kingdom) Sumo Power GT	2:03.785	2:04.659	2:04.392	3
3	23	(United Kingdom) Peter Dumbreck	(United Kingdom) Sumo Power GT	2:03.785	2:04.659	2:04.392	3
4	11	(Netherlands) Mike Hezemans	(Belgium) Mad-Croc Racing	2:04.716	2:04.139	2:04.438	4
4	11	(Netherlands) Xavier Maassen	(Belgium) Mad-Croc Racing	2:04.716	2:04.139	2:04.438	4
5	22	(United Kingdom) Warren Hughes	(United Kingdom) Sumo Power GT	2:04.541	2:05.035	2:04.701	5
5	22	(United Kingdom) Jamie Campbell-Walter	(United Kingdom) Sumo Power GT	2:04.541	2:05.035	2:04.701	5
6	37	(France) Christophe Bouchut	(Germany) All-Inkl.com Münnich Motorsport	2:04.543	2:05.053	2:04.993	6
6	37	(Germany) Marc Basseng	(Germany) All-Inkl.com Münnich Motorsport	2:04.543	2:05.053	2:04.993	6
7	38	(Germany) Dominik Schwager	(Germany) All-Inkl.com Münnich Motorsport	2:05.097	2:05.065	2:05.058	7
7	38	(Netherlands) Nicky Pastorelli	(Germany) All-Inkl.com Münnich Motorsport	2:05.097	2:05.065	2:05.058	7
8	8	(Denmark) Christoffer Nygaard	(Germany) Young Driver AMR	2:05.124	2:05.139	No Time	8
8	8	(Germany) Stefan Mücke	(Germany) Young Driver AMR	2:05.124	2:05.139	No Time	8
9	33	(Germany) Altfrid Heger	(Germany) Triple H Team Hegersport	2:05.139	2:05.202		9
9	33	(Greece) Alexandros Margaritis	(Germany) Triple H Team Hegersport	2:05.139	2:05.202		9
10	2	(Brazil) Enrique Bernoldi	(Germany) Vitaphone Racing Team	2:04.339	2:05.206		10
10	2	(Portugal) Miguel Ramos	(Germany) Vitaphone Racing Team	2:04.339	2:05.206		10
11	13	(Italy) Andrea Piccini	(Germany) Phoenix Racing / Carsport	2:03.924	2:05.360		11
11	13	(Germany) Marc Hennerici	(Germany) Phoenix Racing / Carsport	2:03.924	2:05.360		11
12	34	(Italy) Matteo Bobbi	(Germany) Triple H Team Hegersport	2:04.383	2:05.664		12
12	34	(Belgium) Bert Longin	(Germany) Triple H Team Hegersport	2:04.383	2:05.664		12
13	25	(Brazil) Ricardo Zonta	(Germany) Reiter	2:04.187	2:06.058		13
13	25	(Brazil) Rafael Daniel	(Germany) Reiter	2:04.187	2:06.058		13
14	6	(France) Olivier Panis	(Switzerland) Matech Competition	2:04.624	2:06.110		14
14	6	(Switzerland) Natacha Gachnang	(Switzerland) Matech Competition	2:04.624	2:06.110		14
15	5	(France) Romain Grosjean	(Switzerland) Matech Competition	2:05.102	2:06.414		15
15	5	(Germany) Thomas Mutsch	(Switzerland) Matech Competition	2:05.102	2:06.414		15
16	4	(Japan) Seiji Ara	(Switzerland) Swiss Racing Team	2:04.945	2:07.320		16
16	4	(Sweden) Max Nilsson	(Switzerland) Swiss Racing Team	2:04.945	2:07.320		16
17	7	(United Kingdom) Darren Turner	(Germany) Young Driver AMR	2:05.189			17
17	7	(Czech Republic) Tomáš Enge	(Germany) Young Driver AMR	2:05.189			17
18	40	(Belgium) Bas Leinders	(Belgium) Marc VDS Racing Team	2:05.262			18
18	40	(Belgium) Maxime Martin	(Belgium) Marc VDS Racing Team	2:05.262			18
19	9	(France) Frédéric Makowiecki	(France) Hexis AMR	2:05.330			19
19	9	(France) Thomas Accary	(France) Hexis AMR	2:05.330			19
20	12	(United Kingdom) Oliver Gavin	(Belgium) Mad-Croc Racing	2:05.334			20
20	12	(Finland) Pertti Kuismanen	(Belgium) Mad-Croc Racing	2:05.334			20
21	3	(Austria) Karl Wendlinger	(Switzerland) Swiss Racing Team	2:05.387			21
21	3	(Switzerland) Henri Moser	(Switzerland) Swiss Racing Team	2:05.387			21
22	10	(Switzerland) Jonathan Hirschi	(France) Hexis AMR	2:05.637			22
22	10	(Monaco) Clivio Piccione	(France) Hexis AMR	2:05.637			22
23	41	(Belgium) Renaud Kuppens	(Belgium) Marc VDS Racing Team	2:05.703			23
23	41	(Finland) Markus Palttala	(Belgium) Marc VDS Racing Team	2:05.703			23

== Races ==
=== Qualifying race ===
==== Race result ====
Pos	No.	Team	Drivers	Manufacturer	Laps	Time/Retired
1	1	(Germany) Vitaphone Racing Team	(Germany) Michael Bartels (Italy) Andrea Bertolini	Maserati	27	
2	24	(Germany) Reiter	(Netherlands) Peter Kox (Germany) Christopher Haase	Lamborghini	27	−5.569
3	22	(United Kingdom) Sumo Power GT	(United Kingdom) Warren Hughes (United Kingdom) Jamie Campbell-Walter	Nissan	27	−7.798
4	11	(Belgium) Mad-Croc Racing	(Netherlands) Xavier Maassen (Netherlands) Mike Hezemans	Corvette	27	−10.639
5	2	(Germany) Vitaphone Racing Team	(Portugal) Miguel Ramos (Brazil) Enrique Bernoldi	Maserati	27	−12.821
6	13	(Germany) Phoenix Racing / Carsport	(Germany) Marc Hennerici (Italy) Andrea Piccini	Corvette	27	−16.527
7	5	(Switzerland) Matech Competition	(Germany) Thomas Mutsch (Switzerland) Romain Grosjean	Ford	27	−31.121
8	33	(Germany) Triple H Team Hegersport	(Germany) Altfrid Heger (Greece) Alexandros Margaritis	Maserati	27	−35.443
9	23	(United Kingdom) Sumo Power GT	(United Kingdom) Peter Dumbreck (Germany) Michael Krumm	Nissan	27	−37.236
10	7	(Germany) Young Driver AMR	(Czech Republic) Tomáš Enge (United Kingdom) Darren Turner	Aston Martin	27	−45.843
11	9	(France) Hexis AMR	(France) Frédéric Makowiecki (France) Thomas Accary	Aston Martin	27	−46.941
12	4	(Switzerland) Swiss Racing Team	(Sweden) Max Nilsson (Japan) Seiji Ara	Nissan	27	−50.362
13	25	(Germany) Reiter	(Brazil) Ricardo Zonta (Brazil) Rafael Daniel	Lamborghini	27	−59.155
14	34	(Germany) Triple H Team Hegersport	(Belgium) Bert Longin (Italy) Matteo Bobbi	Maserati	27	−1:03.030
15	38	(Germany) All-Inkl.com Münnich Motorsport	(Netherlands) Nicky Pastorelli (Germany) Dominik Schwager	Lamborghini	27	−1:12.297
16	37	(Germany) All-Inkl.com Münnich Motorsport	(Germany) Marc Basseng (France) Christophe Bouchut	Lamborghini	27	−1:13.153
17	10	(France) Hexis AMR	(Monaco) Clivio Piccione (Switzerland) Jonathan Hirschi	Aston Martin	27	−1:20.561
18	6	(Switzerland) Matech Competition	(Switzerland) Natacha Gachnang (France) Olivier Panis	Ford	27	−1:43.947
19	12	(Belgium) Mad-Croc Racing	(Finland) Pertti Kuismanen (United Kingdom) Oliver Gavin	Corvette	27	−1:52.246
20	40	(Belgium) Marc VDS Racing Team	(Belgium) Bas Leinders (Belgium) Maxime Martin	Ford	27	−2:18.943
21	3	(Switzerland) Swiss Racing Team	(Austria) Karl Wendlinger (Switzerland) Henri Moser	Nissan	26	−1 Lap
22	41	(Belgium) Marc VDS Racing Team	(Belgium) Renaud Kuppens (Finland) Markus Palttala	Ford	26	−1 Lap
23 DNF	8	(Germany) Young Driver AMR	(Germany) Stefan Mücke (Denmark) Christoffer Nygaard	Aston Martin	5	Retired

=== Championship Race ===
==== Race result ====
Pos	No.	Team	Drivers	Manufacturer	Laps	Time/Retired
1	1	(Germany) Vitaphone Racing Team	(Germany) Michael Bartels (Italy) Andrea Bertolini	Maserati	28	
2	23	(United Kingdom) Sumo Power GT	(United Kingdom) Peter Dumbreck (Germany) Michael Krumm	Nissan	28	−7.057
3	33	(Germany) Triple H Team Hegersport	(Germany) Altfrid Heger (Greece) Alexandros Margaritis	Maserati	28	−24.633
4	40	(Belgium) Marc VDS Racing Team	(Belgium) Bas Leinders (Belgium) Maxime Martin	Ford	28	−26.209
5	13	(Germany) Phoenix Racing / Carsport	(Germany) Marc Hennerici (Italy) Andrea Piccini	Corvette	28	−29.670
6	11	(Belgium) Mad-Croc Racing	(Netherlands) Xavier Maassen (Netherlands) Mike Hezemans	Corvette	28	−35.824
7	5	(Switzerland) Matech Competition	(Germany) Thomas Mutsch (Switzerland) Romain Grosjean	Ford	28	−46.178
8	22	(United Kingdom) Sumo Power GT	(United Kingdom) Warren Hughes (United Kingdom) Jamie Campbell-Walter	Nissan	28	−54.364
9	9	(France) Hexis AMR	(France) Frédéric Makowiecki (France) Thomas Accary	Aston Martin	28	−56.699
10	25	(Germany) Reiter	(Brazil) Ricardo Zonta (Brazil) Rafael Daniel	Lamborghini	28	−57.226
11	34	(Germany) Triple H Team Hegersport	(Belgium) Bert Longin (Italy) Matteo Bobbi	Maserati	28	−1:04.943
12	38	(Germany) All-Inkl.com Münnich Motorsport	(Netherlands) Nicky Pastorelli (Germany) Dominik Schwager	Lamborghini	28	−1:05.405
13	10	(France) Hexis AMR	(Monaco) Clivio Piccione (Switzerland) Jonathan Hirschi	Aston Martin	28	−1:11.342
14	41	(Belgium) Marc VDS Racing Team	(Belgium) Renaud Kuppens (Finland) Markus Palttala	Ford	28	−1:14.776
15	3	(Switzerland) Swiss Racing Team	(Austria) Karl Wendlinger (Switzerland) Henri Moser	Nissan	28	−1:17.780
16	7	(Germany) Young Driver AMR	(Czech Republic) Tomáš Enge (United Kingdom) Darren Turner	Aston Martin	28	−1:23.897
17	37	(Germany) All-Inkl.com Münnich Motorsport	(Germany) Marc Basseng (France) Christophe Bouchut	Lamborghini	28	−1:26.100
18	24	(Germany) Reiter	(Netherlands) Peter Kox (Germany) Christopher Haase	Lamborghini	28	−1:47.230
19	12	(Belgium) Mad-Croc Racing	(Finland) Pertti Kuismanen (United Kingdom) Oliver Gavin	Corvette	28	−1:47.240
20	8	(Germany) Young Driver AMR	(Germany) Stefan Mücke (Denmark) Christoffer Nygaard	Aston Martin	28	−1:53.704
21 DNF	6	(Switzerland) Matech Competition	(Switzerland) Natacha Gachnang (France) Olivier Panis	Ford	17	Retired
22 DNF	2	(Germany) Vitaphone Racing Team	(Portugal) Miguel Ramos (Brazil) Enrique Bernoldi	Maserati	10	Retired
23 DNF	4	(Switzerland) Swiss Racing Team	(Sweden) Max Nilsson (Japan) Seiji Ara	Nissan	9	Retired

FIA GT1 World Championship
Previous race: Brno	2010 season	Next race: Spa-Francorchamps
