= 2010 FIA GT1 Algarve round =

Layout of the Algarve International Circuit

The 2010 FIA GT1 Algarve round was an auto race held at the Autódromo Internacional do Algarve, Portimão, Portugal on 17–19 September 2010. Serving as the seventh round of the 2010 FIA GT1 World Championship season, the FIA GT1 race served as part of the larger Portimão Supercar event and was joined by the FIA GT3 European Championship, GT4 European Cup, and Superleague Formula. The former FIA GT Championship previously raced at the Algarve circuit in 2009.

== Background ==
Success Ballast
Entry	Ballast
No. 7 Young Driver AMR	40 kg (88 lb)
No. 24 Reiter	30 kg (66 lb)
No. 13 Phoenix Racing / Carsport	20 kg (44 lb)
No. 1 Vitaphone Racing Team	10 kg (22 lb)
No. 10 Hexis AMR	10 kg (22 lb)
No. 33 Triple H Team Hegersport	10 kg (22 lb)

As part of the FIA Balance of Performance, Ford GTs were allowed the team to increase the size of their air restrictors for more power, although the cars also had to carry an extra 12 kg (26 lb) of ballast. Further, six teams entered the Portimão round with success ballast. The No. 7 Young Driver which won the previous round at the Nürburgring carried 40 kg (88 lb), while further top four finishers Reiter, Phoenix, and Hexis also gained ballast. The No. 11 Vitaphone entry, which led both the Drivers' and Teams' Championships entering Portimão, retains 10 kg (22 lb) of the 20 previously carried in the previous round, while the No. 33 Hegersport car shed 40 kg of ballast carried over from the Nürburgring.

Michael Bartels and Andrea Bertolini of Vitaphone retained the Drivers' Championship lead they had held since the Paul Ricard round, holding a fourteen-point gap over Thomas Mutsch of Matech. Tomáš Enge and Darren Turner shared third place a further twelve points behind Mutsch. In the Teams' Championship, Vitaphone also held the points lead by a margin of 26 points over Reiter, while Young Driver were four points further back.

== Qualifying ==
Phoenix's Marc Hennerici was able to put the team's sole Corvette on pole position in the final qualifying session by a margin of three hundredths of a second. Marc VDS initially earned their best qualifying position to date by claiming the front row in the No. 40 Ford GT, but were later penalized to the back of the grid after their car failed a stall test during technical inspection. The penalty promoted the No. 23 Sumo Power Nissan to the front row, while the Vitaphone duo locked out the second row on the grid.

=== Qualifying result ===
For qualifying, Driver 1 participates in the first and third sessions while Driver 2 participates in only the second session. The fastest lap for each session is indicated with bold.

Pos	No.	Driver 1	Team	Session 1	Session 2	Session 3	Grid
Pos	No.	Driver 2	Team	Session 1	Session 2	Session 3	Grid
1	13	(Germany) Marc Hennerici	(Germany) Phoenix Racing / Carsport	1:42.912	1:42.597	1:42.394	1
1	13	(Greece) Alexandros Margaritis	(Germany) Phoenix Racing / Carsport	1:42.912	1:42.597	1:42.394	1
2	40	(Belgium) Maxime Martin	(Belgium) Marc VDS Racing Team	1:42.802	1:43.022	1:42.424	23
2	40	(Belgium) Bas Leinders	(Belgium) Marc VDS Racing Team	1:42.802	1:43.022	1:42.424	23
3	23	(United Kingdom) Peter Dumbreck	(United Kingdom) Sumo Power GT	1:43.102	1:42.583	1:42.724	2
3	23	(Germany) Michael Krumm	(United Kingdom) Sumo Power GT	1:43.102	1:42.583	1:42.724	2
4	2	(Brazil) Enrique Bernoldi	(Germany) Vitaphone Racing Team	1:43.188	1:43.327	1:42.827	3
4	2	(Portugal) Miguel Ramos	(Germany) Vitaphone Racing Team	1:43.188	1:43.327	1:42.827	3
5	1	(Italy) Andrea Bertolini	(Germany) Vitaphone Racing Team	1:43.088	1:42.721	1:42.843	4
5	1	(Germany) Michael Bartels	(Germany) Vitaphone Racing Team	1:43.088	1:42.721	1:42.843	4
6	38	(Netherlands) Nicky Pastorelli	(Germany) All-Inkl.com Münnich Motorsport	1:43.398	1:42.901	1:43.537	5
6	38	(Germany) Dominik Schwager	(Germany) All-Inkl.com Münnich Motorsport	1:43.398	1:42.901	1:43.537	5
7	34	(Austria) Nikolaus Mayr-Melnhof	(Germany) Triple H Team Hegersport	1:43.439	1:42.465	1:44.605	6
7	34	(Italy) Alessandro Pier Guidi	(Germany) Triple H Team Hegersport	1:43.439	1:42.465	1:44.605	6
8	33	(Germany) Altfrid Heger	(Germany) Triple H Team Hegersport	1:43.557	1:43.153	No Time	7
8	33	(Germany) Alex Müller	(Germany) Triple H Team Hegersport	1:43.557	1:43.153	No Time	7
9	37	(France) Christophe Bouchut	(Germany) All-Inkl.com Münnich Motorsport	1:43.153	1:43.429		8
9	37	(Germany) Marc Basseng	(Germany) All-Inkl.com Münnich Motorsport	1:43.153	1:43.429		8
10	25	(Germany) Frank Kechele	(Germany) Reiter	1:42.750	1:43.510		9
10	25	(Netherlands) Jos Menten	(Germany) Reiter	1:42.750	1:43.510		9
11	7	(United Kingdom) Darren Turner	(Germany) Young Driver AMR	1:43.110	1:43.581		10
11	7	(Czech Republic) Tomáš Enge	(Germany) Young Driver AMR	1:43.110	1:43.581		10
12	11	(France) Julien Jousse	(Belgium) Mad-Croc Racing	1:42.819	1:43.727		11
12	11	(Netherlands) Xavier Maassen	(Belgium) Mad-Croc Racing	1:42.819	1:43.727		11
13	8	(Germany) Stefan Mücke	(Germany) Young Driver AMR	1:43.397	1:44.303		12
13	8	(Portugal) Pedro Lamy	(Germany) Young Driver AMR	1:43.397	1:44.303		12
14	9	(France) Frédéric Makowiecki	(France) Hexis AMR	1:43.102	1:44.596		13
14	9	(France) Yann Clairay	(France) Hexis AMR	1:43.102	1:44.596		13
15	4	(Japan) Seiji Ara	(Switzerland) Swiss Racing Team	1:42.953	1:44.607		14
15	4	(Sweden) Max Nilsson	(Switzerland) Swiss Racing Team	1:42.953	1:44.607		14
16	12	(France) Laurent Cazenave	(Belgium) Mad-Croc Racing	1:43.568	1:45.124		15
16	12	(Finland) Pertti Kuismanen	(Belgium) Mad-Croc Racing	1:43.568	1:45.124		15
17	6	(France) Nicolas Prost	(Switzerland) Matech Competition	1:43.762			16
17	6	(Switzerland) Neel Jani	(Switzerland) Matech Competition	1:43.762			16
18	41	(Finland) Markus Palttala	(Belgium) Marc VDS Racing Team	1:43.796			17
18	41	(Belgium) Renaud Kuppens	(Belgium) Marc VDS Racing Team	1:43.796			17
19	3	(Austria) Karl Wendlinger	(Switzerland) Swiss Racing Team	1:43.812			18
19	3	(Switzerland) Henri Moser	(Switzerland) Swiss Racing Team	1:43.812			18
20	10	(Switzerland) Jonathan Hirschi	(France) Hexis AMR	1:43.904			19
20	10	(Monaco) Clivio Piccione	(France) Hexis AMR	1:43.904			19
21	24	(Netherlands) Peter Kox	(Germany) Reiter	1:44.008			20
21	24	(Germany) Christopher Haase	(Germany) Reiter	1:44.008			20
22	5	(Germany) Thomas Mutsch	(Switzerland) Matech Competition	1:44.083			21
22	5	(United Kingdom) Richard Westbrook	(Switzerland) Matech Competition	1:44.083			21
23	22	(United Kingdom) Jamie Campbell-Walter	(United Kingdom) Sumo Power GT	1:44.686			22
23	22	(United Kingdom) Warren Hughes	(United Kingdom) Sumo Power GT	1:44.686			22

== Races ==
=== Qualifying Race ===
Alexandros Margaritis led the field away from pole position, taking command for the first half of the race. After the pit stop and driver change, Sumo Power's Peter Dumbreck was able to catch up to leader Marc Hennerici, eventually passing the Corvette into Turn 1 in the final ten minutes of the race. The Vitaphone Maserati of Andrea Bertolini, following close behind the two, was eventually able to also pass Hennerici and secure second place

==== Race result ====
Pos	No.	Team	Drivers	Manufacturer	Laps	Time/Retired
1	23	(United Kingdom) Sumo Power GT	(United Kingdom) Peter Dumbreck (Germany) Michael Krumm	Nissan	34	
2	1	(Germany) Vitaphone Racing Team	(Germany) Michael Bartels (Italy) Andrea Bertolini	Maserati	34	−2.474
3	13	(Germany) Phoenix Racing / Carsport	(Germany) Marc Hennerici (Greece) Alexandros Margaritis	Corvette	34	−9.222
4	7	(Germany) Young Driver AMR	(Czech Republic) Tomáš Enge (United Kingdom) Darren Turner	Aston Martin	34	−26.210
5	5	(Switzerland) Matech Competition	(Germany) Thomas Mutsch (United Kingdom) Richard Westbrook	Ford	34	−29.079
6	33	(Germany) Triple H Team Hegersport	(Germany) Altfrid Heger (Germany) Alex Müller	Maserati	34	−39.464
7	11	(Belgium) Mad-Croc Racing	(Netherlands) Xavier Maassen (France) Julien Jousse	Corvette	34	−39.581
8	38	(Germany) All-Inkl.com Münnich Motorsport	(Netherlands) Nicky Pastorelli (Germany) Dominik Schwager	Lamborghini	34	−39.982
9	22	(United Kingdom) Sumo Power GT	(United Kingdom) Warren Hughes (United Kingdom) Jamie Campbell-Walter	Nissan	34	−40.108
10	9	(France) Hexis AMR	(France) Frédéric Makowiecki (France) Yann Clairay	Aston Martin	34	−40.428
11	4	(Switzerland) Swiss Racing Team	(Sweden) Max Nilsson (Japan) Seiji Ara	Nissan	34	−40.680
12	24	(Germany) Reiter	(Netherlands) Peter Kox (Germany) Christopher Haase	Lamborghini	34	−41.549
13	2	(Germany) Vitaphone Racing Team	(Portugal) Miguel Ramos (Brazil) Enrique Bernoldi	Maserati	34	−43.590
14	25	(Germany) Reiter	(Netherlands) Jos Menten (Germany) Frank Kechele	Lamborghini	34	−44.500
15	8	(Germany) Young Driver AMR	(Germany) Stefan Mücke (Portugal) Pedro Lamy	Aston Martin	34	−47.150
16	10	(France) Hexis AMR	(Monaco) Clivio Piccione (Switzerland) Jonathan Hirschi	Aston Martin	34	−58.365
17	12	(Belgium) Mad-Croc Racing	(Finland) Pertti Kuismanen (France) Laurent Cazenave	Corvette	34	−1:51.030
18	34	(Germany) Triple H Team Hegersport	(Austria) Nikolaus Mayr-Melnhof (Italy) Alessandro Pier Guidi	Maserati	33	−1 Lap
19	41	(Belgium) Marc VDS Racing Team	(Belgium) Renaud Kuppens (Finland) Markus Palttala	Ford	33	−1 Lap
20	6	(Switzerland) Matech Competition	(France) Nicolas Prost (Switzerland) Neel Jani	Ford	25	−9 Laps
21 DNF	40	(Belgium) Marc VDS Racing Team	(Belgium) Bas Leinders (Belgium) Maxime Martin	Ford	22	Retired
22 DNF	3	(Switzerland) Swiss Racing Team	(Austria) Karl Wendlinger (Switzerland) Henri Moser	Nissan	18	Damage
23 DNF	37	(Germany) All-Inkl.com Münnich Motorsport	(Germany) Marc Basseng (France) Christophe Bouchut	Lamborghini	13	Retired

=== Championship Race ===
Following the Qualifying Race win, the Sumo Power Nissan led into the first turn, ahead of the No. 1 Vitaphone Maserati. Further down the field the No. 38 Münnich Lamborghini spun onto the outside runoff where it was collected by the No. 2 Vitaphone Maserati. Jamie Campbell-Walter's Nissan was also hit in the first turn, causing steering damage and forcing the team's retirement. At the opening of the pit window, the two leaders pitted together, but Sumo Power suffered from a tire change problem which dropped them down the race order, handing the lead to Vitaphone's Andrea Bertolini. The Phoenix Racing Corvette was promoted into second after the pit stops before being overtaken by Richard Westbrook in the No. 5 Matech Ford. Westbrook attempted to chase down the leading Maserati, but was only able to come within a second and a half at the end of the race.

==== Race result ====
Pos	No.	Team	Drivers	Manufacturer	Laps	Time/Retired
1	1	(Germany) Vitaphone Racing Team	(Germany) Michael Bartels (Italy) Andrea Bertolini	Maserati	34	
2	5	(Switzerland) Matech Competition	(Germany) Thomas Mutsch (United Kingdom) Richard Westbrook	Ford	34	−1.402
3	13	(Germany) Phoenix Racing / Carsport	(Germany) Marc Hennerici (Greece) Alexandros Margaritis	Corvette	34	−15.482
4	23	(United Kingdom) Sumo Power GT	(United Kingdom) Peter Dumbreck (Germany) Michael Krumm	Nissan	34	−24.623
5	40	(Belgium) Marc VDS Racing Team	(Belgium) Bas Leinders (Belgium) Maxime Martin	Ford	34	−31.945
6	9	(France) Hexis AMR	(France) Frédéric Makowiecki (France) Yann Clairay	Aston Martin	34	−32.483
7	24	(Germany) Reiter	(Netherlands) Peter Kox (Germany) Christopher Haase	Lamborghini	34	−32.850
8	25	(Germany) Reiter	(Netherlands) Jos Menten (Germany) Frank Kechele	Lamborghini	34	−34.845
9	33	(Germany) Triple H Team Hegersport	(Germany) Altfrid Heger (Germany) Alex Müller	Maserati	34	−41.948
10	7	(Germany) Young Driver AMR	(Czech Republic) Tomáš Enge (United Kingdom) Darren Turner	Aston Martin	34	−43.495
11	8	(Germany) Young Driver AMR	(Germany) Stefan Mücke (Portugal) Pedro Lamy	Aston Martin	34	−44.434
12	6	(Switzerland) Matech Competition	(France) Nicolas Prost (Switzerland) Neel Jani	Ford	34	−46.306
13	10	(France) Hexis AMR	(Monaco) Clivio Piccione (Switzerland) Jonathan Hirschi	Aston Martin	34	−47.565
14	11	(Belgium) Mad-Croc Racing	(Netherlands) Xavier Maassen (France) Julien Jousse	Corvette	34	−54.916
15	41	(Belgium) Marc VDS Racing Team	(Belgium) Renaud Kuppens (Finland) Markus Palttala	Ford	34	−1:10.419
16	12	(Belgium) Mad-Croc Racing	(Finland) Pertti Kuismanen (France) Laurent Cazenave	Corvette	33	−1 Lap
17	37	(Germany) All-Inkl.com Münnich Motorsport	(Germany) Marc Basseng (France) Christophe Bouchut	Lamborghini	32	−2 Laps
18	4	(Switzerland) Swiss Racing Team	(Sweden) Max Nilsson (Japan) Seiji Ara	Nissan	32	−2 Laps
19	34	(Germany) Triple H Team Hegersport	(Austria) Nikolaus Mayr-Melnhof (Italy) Alessandro Pier Guidi	Maserati	32	−2 Laps
20	3	(Switzerland) Swiss Racing Team	(Austria) Karl Wendlinger (Switzerland) Henri Moser	Nissan	31	−3 Laps
21 DNF	38	(Germany) All-Inkl.com Münnich Motorsport	(Netherlands) Nicky Pastorelli (Germany) Dominik Schwager	Lamborghini	13	Retired
22 DNF	22	(United Kingdom) Sumo Power GT	(United Kingdom) Warren Hughes (United Kingdom) Jamie Campbell-Walter	Nissan	1	Damage
23 DNF	2	(Germany) Vitaphone Racing Team	(Portugal) Miguel Ramos (Brazil) Enrique Bernoldi	Maserati	0	Collision

FIA GT1 World Championship
Previous race: Nürburgring	2010 season	Next race: Navarra
