= 2010 FIA GT1 San Luis round =

The Potrero de los Funes Circuit

The 2010 FIA GT1 San Luis round was an auto racing event held at the Potrero de los Funes, San Luis, Argentina on 3–5 December 2010, and served as the tenth and final round of the 2010 FIA GT1 World Championship season. The event shared the weekend with the TC 2000. The pairing of Stefan Mücke and José María López of the Young Driver AMR Aston Martin earned pole position and earned the fastest lap times in all three qualifying sessions thanks to the new addition of Argentinian racer López. The Hexis AMR Aston Martin pairing of Yann Clairay and Frédéric Makowiecki won both the Qualifying and Championship Races by a considerable margin.

== Qualifying ==
=== Qualifying result ===
For qualifying, Driver 1 participates in the first and third sessions while Driver 2 participates in only the second session. The fastest lap for each session is indicated with bold.

Pos	No.	Driver 1	Team	Session 1	Session 2	Session 3	Grid
Pos	No.	Driver 2	Team	Session 1	Session 2	Session 3	Grid
1	8	(Germany) Stefan Mücke	(Germany) Young Driver AMR	2:15.276	2:15.611	2:14.406	1
1	8	(Argentina) José María López	(Germany) Young Driver AMR	2:15.276	2:15.611	2:14.406	1
2	9	(France) Frédéric Makowiecki	(France) Hexis AMR	2:16.732	2:16.850	2:14.764	2
2	9	(France) Yann Clairay	(France) Hexis AMR	2:16.732	2:16.850	2:14.764	2
3	1	(Italy) Andrea Bertolini	(Germany) Vitaphone Racing Team	2:16.390	2:15.710	2:15.200	3
3	1	(Germany) Michael Bartels	(Germany) Vitaphone Racing Team	2:16.390	2:15.710	2:15.200	3
4	25	(Germany) Frank Kechele	(Germany) Reiter	2:16.825	2:16.051	2:15.378	9
4	25	(Brazil) Sérgio Jimenez	(Germany) Reiter	2:16.825	2:16.051	2:15.378	9
5	10	(Monaco) Clivio Piccione	(France) Hexis AMR	2:17.072	2:16.950	2:15.767	4
5	10	(Switzerland) Jonathan Hirschi	(France) Hexis AMR	2:17.072	2:16.950	2:15.767	4
6	24	(Netherlands) Peter Kox	(Germany) Reiter	2:16.843	2:16.344	2:15.835	5
6	24	(Germany) Christopher Haase	(Germany) Reiter	2:16.843	2:16.344	2:15.835	5
7	38	(Netherlands) Nicky Pastorelli	(Germany) All-Inkl.com Münnich Motorsport	2:17.105	2:16.485	2:16.407	6
7	38	(Germany) Dominik Schwager	(Germany) All-Inkl.com Münnich Motorsport	2:17.105	2:16.485	2:16.407	6
8	23	(Germany) Michael Krumm	(United Kingdom) Sumo Power GT	2:16.412	2:16.304	2:16.448	7
8	23	(United Kingdom) Peter Dumbreck	(United Kingdom) Sumo Power GT	2:16.412	2:16.304	2:16.448	7
9	6	(Switzerland) Neel Jani	(Switzerland) Matech Competition	2:16.590	2:17.109		8
9	6	(France) Nicolas Armindo	(Switzerland) Matech Competition	2:16.590	2:17.109		8
10	5	(United Kingdom) Richard Westbrook	(Switzerland) Matech Competition	2:16.192	2:17.213		10
10	5	(Germany) Thomas Mutsch	(Switzerland) Matech Competition	2:16.192	2:17.213		10
11	34	(Belgium) Nico Verdonck	(Germany) Triple H Team Hegersport	2:16.657	2:17.415		11
11	34	(Italy) Alessandro Pier Guidi	(Germany) Triple H Team Hegersport	2:16.657	2:17.415		11
12	40	(Belgium) Bas Leinders	(Belgium) Marc VDS Racing Team	2:16.034	2:17.510		12
12	40	(Belgium) Maxime Martin	(Belgium) Marc VDS Racing Team	2:16.034	2:17.510		12
13	2	(Brazil) Enrique Bernoldi	(Germany) Vitaphone Racing Team	2:16.796	2:17.836		13
13	2	(Portugal) Miguel Ramos	(Germany) Vitaphone Racing Team	2:16.796	2:17.836		13
14	13	(Germany) Marc Hennerici	(Germany) Phoenix Racing / Carsport	2:16.982	2:17.866		14
14	13	(Greece) Alexander Margaritis	(Germany) Phoenix Racing / Carsport	2:16.982	2:17.866		14
15	37	(Argentina) Ricardo Risatti	(Germany) All-Inkl.com Münnich Motorsport	2:16.732	2:17.884		15
15	37	(Germany) Marc Basseng	(Germany) All-Inkl.com Münnich Motorsport	2:16.732	2:17.884		15
16	33	(Germany) Alex Müller	(Germany) Triple H Team Hegersport	2:16.512	2:18.516		16
16	33	(Germany) Altfrid Heger	(Germany) Triple H Team Hegersport	2:16.512	2:18.516		16
17	7	(United Kingdom) Darren Turner	(Germany) Young Driver AMR	2:17.183			17
17	7	(Czech Republic) Tomáš Enge	(Germany) Young Driver AMR	2:17.183			17
18	22	(United Kingdom) Warren Hughes	(United Kingdom) Sumo Power GT	2:17.256			18
18	22	(United Kingdom) Jamie Campbell-Walter	(United Kingdom) Sumo Power GT	2:17.256			18
19	41	(Italy) Matteo Bobbi	(Belgium) Marc VDS Racing Team	2:17.293			19
19	41	(Finland) Markus Palttala	(Belgium) Marc VDS Racing Team	2:17.293			19
20	4	(Sweden) Max Nilsson	(Switzerland) Swiss Racing Team	2:17.609			20
20	4	(Japan) Seiji Ara	(Switzerland) Swiss Racing Team	2:17.609			20
21	3	(Austria) Karl Wendlinger	(Switzerland) Swiss Racing Team	2:17.809			21
21	3	(Switzerland) Henri Moser	(Switzerland) Swiss Racing Team	2:17.809			21
22	12	(Netherlands) Duncan Huisman	(Belgium) Mad-Croc Racing	No Time			WD
22	12	(Finland) Pertti Kuismanen	(Belgium) Mad-Croc Racing	No Time			WD

== Qualifying Race ==
=== Race result ===
Pos	No.	Team	Drivers	Manufacturer	Laps	Time/Retired
1	9	(France) Hexis AMR	(France) Frédéric Makowiecki (France) Yann Clairay	Aston Martin	22	
2	5	(Switzerland) Matech Competition	(United Kingdom) Richard Westbrook (Germany) Thomas Mutsch	Ford	22	−13.029
3	40	(Belgium) Marc VDS Racing Team	(Belgium) Bas Leinders (Belgium) Maxime Martin	Ford	22	−13.477
4	10	(France) Hexis AMR	(Monaco) Clivio Piccione (Switzerland) Jonathan Hirschi	Aston Martin	22	−22.205
5	25	(Germany) Reiter	(Germany) Frank Kechele (Brazil) Sérgio Jimenez	Lamborghini	22	−26.195
6	23	(United Kingdom) Sumo Power GT	(Germany) Michael Krumm (United Kingdom) Peter Dumbreck	Nissan	22	−28.206
7	3	(Switzerland) Swiss Racing Team	(Austria) Karl Wendlinger (Switzerland) Henri Moser	Nissan	22	−29.587
8	34	(Germany) Triple H Team Hegersport	(Belgium) Nico Verdonck (Italy) Alessandro Pier Guidi	Maserati	22	−31.065
9	38	(Germany) All-Inkl.com Münnich Motorsport	(Netherlands) Nicky Pastorelli (Germany) Dominik Schwager	Lamborghini	22	−34.182
10	7	(Germany) Young Driver AMR	(United Kingdom) Darren Turner (Czech Republic) Tomáš Enge	Aston Martin	22	−35.849
11	33	(Germany) Triple H Team Hegersport	(Germany) Alex Müller (Germany) Altfrid Heger	Maserati	22	−42.835
12	1	(Germany) Vitaphone Racing Team	(Italy) Andrea Bertolini (Germany) Michael Bartels	Maserati	22	−43.383
13	22	(United Kingdom) Sumo Power GT	(United Kingdom) Warren Hughes (United Kingdom) Jamie Campbell-Walter	Nissan	22	−45.326
14	37	(Germany) All-Inkl.com Münnich Motorsport	(Argentina) Ricardo Risatti (Germany) Marc Basseng	Lamborghini	22	−49.560
15	41	(Belgium) Marc VDS Racing Team	(Italy) Matteo Bobbi (Finland) Markus Palttala	Ford	22	−50.247
16	2	(Germany) Vitaphone Racing Team	(Brazil) Enrique Bernoldi (Portugal) Miguel Ramos	Maserati	22	−52.989
17	6	(Switzerland) Matech Competition	(Switzerland) Neel Jani (France) Nicolas Armindo	Ford	22	−2:06.747
18 DNF	13	(Germany) Phoenix Racing / Carsport	(Germany) Marc Hennerici (Greece) Alexander Margaritis	Corvette	19	Mechanical
19 DNF	24	(Germany) Reiter	(Netherlands) Peter Kox (Germany) Christopher Haase	Lamborghini	1	Collision
20 DNF	4	(Switzerland) Swiss Racing Team	(Sweden) Max Nilsson (Japan) Seiji Ara	Nissan	0	Retired
21 DNF	8	(Germany) Young Driver AMR	(Germany) Stefan Mücke (Argentina) José María López	Aston Martin	0	Collision

== Championship Race ==
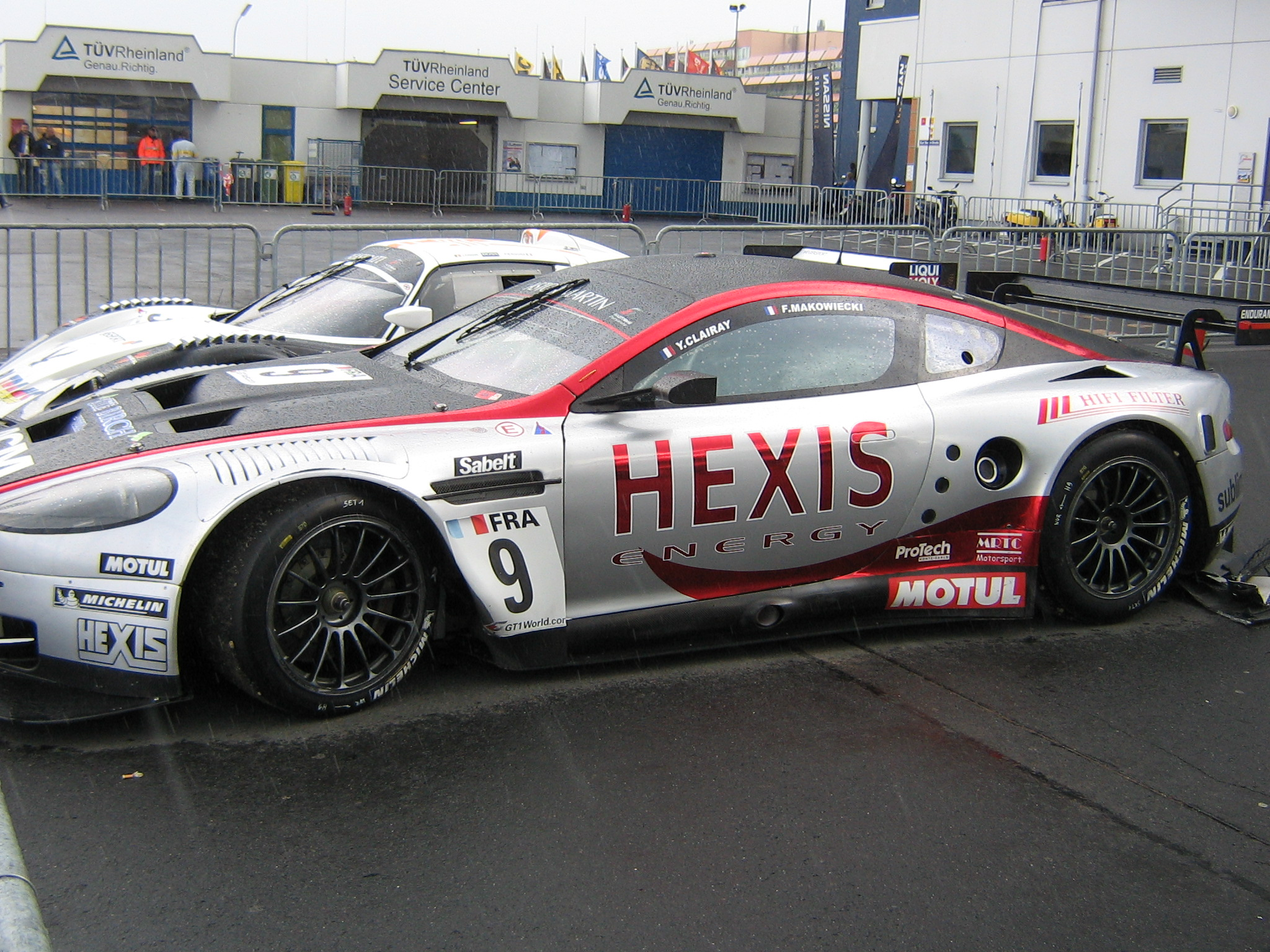
Frédéric Makowiecki and Yann Clairay's winning Aston Martin DBR9.

=== Race result ===
Pos	No.	Team	Drivers	Manufacturer	Laps	Time/Retired
1	9	(France) Hexis AMR	(France) Frédéric Makowiecki (France) Yann Clairay	Aston Martin	26	
2	5	(Switzerland) Matech Competition	(United Kingdom) Richard Westbrook (Germany) Thomas Mutsch	Ford	26	−13.616
3	10	(France) Hexis AMR	(Monaco) Clivio Piccione (Switzerland) Jonathan Hirschi	Aston Martin	26	−23.159
4	25	(Germany) Reiter	(Germany) Frank Kechele (Brazil) Sérgio Jimenez	Lamborghini	26	−23.623
5	8	(Germany) Young Driver AMR	(Germany) Stefan Mücke (Argentina) José María López	Aston Martin	26	−26.883
6	37	(Germany) All-Inkl.com Münnich Motorsport	(Argentina) Ricardo Risatti (Germany) Marc Basseng	Lamborghini	26	−27.827
7	1	(Germany) Vitaphone Racing Team	(Italy) Andrea Bertolini (Germany) Michael Bartels	Maserati	26	−32.440
8	6	(Switzerland) Matech Competition	(Switzerland) Neel Jani (France) Nicolas Armindo	Ford	26	−38.646
9	33	(Germany) Triple H Team Hegersport	(Germany) Alex Müller (Germany) Altfrid Heger	Maserati	26	−51.610
10	24	(Germany) Reiter	(Netherlands) Peter Kox (Germany) Christopher Haase	Lamborghini	26	−58.398
11	38	(Germany) All-Inkl.com Münnich Motorsport	(Netherlands) Nicky Pastorelli (Germany) Dominik Schwager	Lamborghini	26	−1:29.624
12	13	(Germany) Phoenix Racing / Carsport	(Germany) Marc Hennerici (Greece) Alexander Margaritis	Corvette	26	−1:34.407
13	4	(Switzerland) Swiss Racing Team	(Sweden) Max Nilsson (Japan) Seiji Ara	Nissan	26	−1:41.277
14	2	(Germany) Vitaphone Racing Team	(Brazil) Enrique Bernoldi (Portugal) Miguel Ramos	Maserati	26	−1:41.555
15	7	(Germany) Young Driver AMR	(Czech Republic) Tomáš Enge (United Kingdom) Darren Turner	Aston Martin	22	−1:44.685
16 DNF	22	(United Kingdom) Sumo Power GT	(United Kingdom) Warren Hughes (United Kingdom) Jamie Campbell-Walter	Nissan	22	Gearbox
17 DNF	23	(United Kingdom) Sumo Power GT	(Germany) Michael Krumm (United Kingdom) Peter Dumbreck	Nissan	18	Steering
18 DNF	41	(Belgium) Marc VDS Racing Team	(Italy) Matteo Bobbi (Finland) Markus Palttala	Ford	16	Retired
19 DNF	40	(Belgium) Marc VDS Racing Team	(Belgium) Bas Leinders (Belgium) Maxime Martin	Ford	16	Mechanical
20 DNF	34	(Germany) Triple H Team Hegersport	(Belgium) Nico Verdonck (Italy) Alessandro Pier Guidi	Maserati	13	Retired
21 DNF	3	(Switzerland) Swiss Racing Team	(Austria) Karl Wendlinger (Switzerland) Henri Moser	Nissan	13	Collision

FIA GT1 World Championship
Previous race: Interlagos	2010 season	Next race: none
