= 2010 RAC Tourist Trophy =

The new Arena layout of the Silverstone Circuit

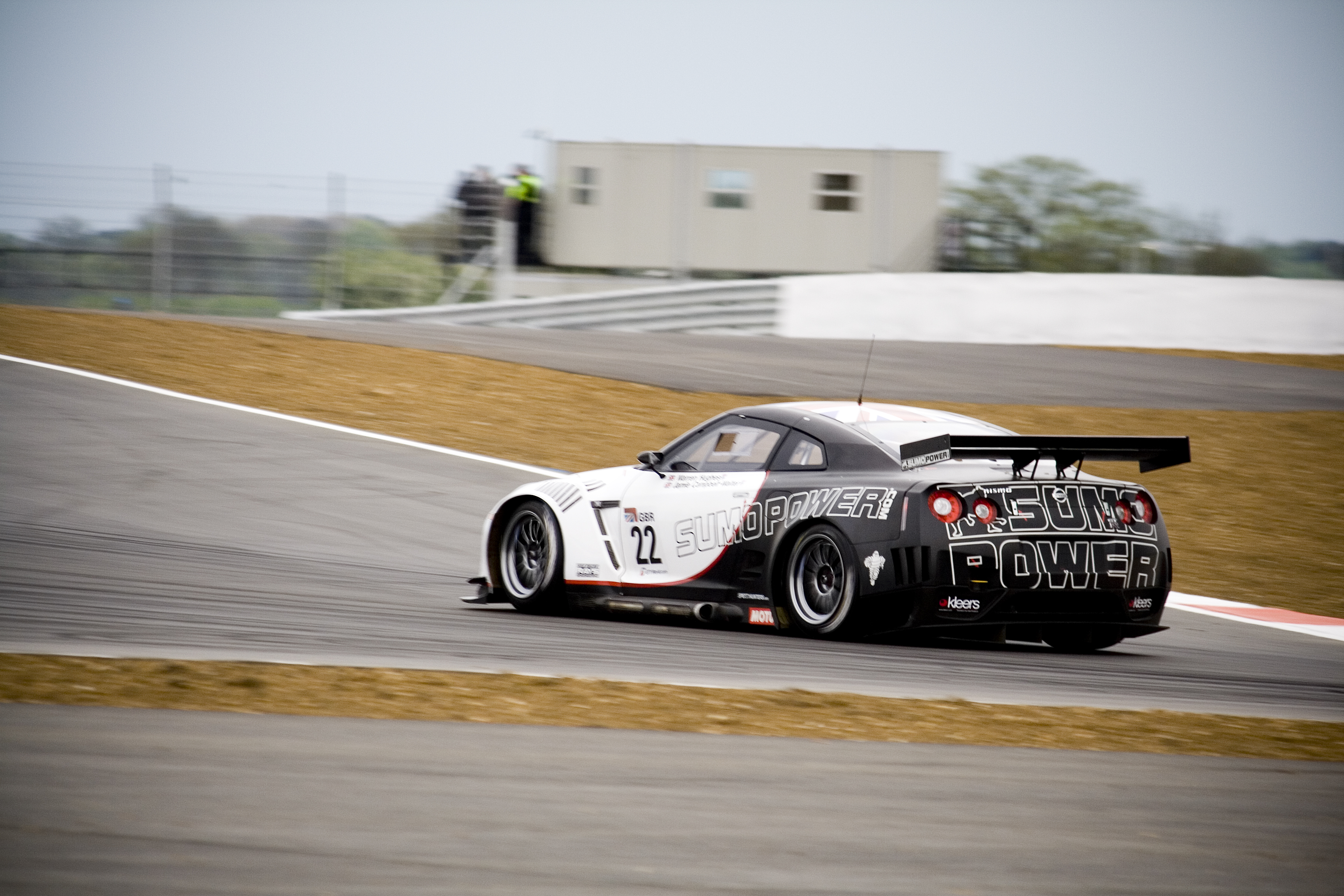
The No. 22 Sumo Power GT Nissan GT-R driven to victory in the Tourist Trophy by Brits Jamie Campbell-Walter and Warren Hughes.

The 2010 RAC Tourist Trophy was an auto race held at the Silverstone Circuit, Northamptonshire and Buckinghamshire, Great Britain from 30 April–2 May. The event, the second round of the 2010 FIA GT1 World Championship season, was among the first to use the revised 5.900 km (3.666 mi) Arena layout of the Silverstone Circuit that was completed in early 2010. The GT1 series was part of the larger Silverstone Supercar 2010 event, sharing the weekend with the FIA GT3 European Championship, GT4 European Cup, and the British Formula 3 Championship. The Championship race also served to award an annual champion for RAC Tourist Trophy, awarded by the Royal Automobile Club.

The British manufacturer Aston Martin dominated much of the early event, winning pole position in Qualifying with Darren Turner and Tomáš Enge's Young Driver AMR entry before Hexis AMR swept the top two spots in the Qualifying Race, led by drivers Frédéric Makowiecki and Thomas Accary. Turner and Enge would then go on to win the Championship Race, but were later excluded from the race when their Aston Martin failed technical inspections. This, as well as a time penalty for a Hexis Aston Martin, promoted initial third-place finishers Jamie Campbell-Walter and Warren Hughes of Sumo Power Nissan to the race victory and the award of the Tourist Trophy. Aston Martin settled for second, while Lamborghini earned their first podium in the championship with a third place.

== Background ==
Success Ballast
Entry	Ballast
No. 5 Matech Competition	40 kg (88 lb)
No. 13 Phoenix Racing / Carsport	30 kg (66 lb)
No. 14 Phoenix Racing / Carsport	20 kg (44 lb)
No. 1 Vitaphone Racing Team	10 kg (22 lb)

Following the opening round in Abu Dhabi, the Nissan teams of Sumo Power GT and Swiss Racing Team voiced their opinions on the balance of performance which was used in Abu Dhabi. The teams believed that the tests held prior to race has unfairly allowed the Nissan GT-R to be too hindered heavily weighted compared to its competitors, receiving 30 kg (66 lb) of extra ballast weight. Sumo Power and Swiss Racing left Abu Dhabi without earning any championship points. Allen Orchard of Sumo Power GT stated that the team planned to protest to the FIA, while Othmar Welti of Swiss Racing Team even threatened to boycott the event if the ballast remained unchanged. On 27 April the FIA made further changes to the balance of performance, making alterations to the weights of five of the six manufacturers. Corvette and Maserati both gained extra ballast while Aston Martin, Lamborghini, and Nissan all shed some of their previous ballast weight. The Lamborghini and Maserati also had air restrictor modifications made.

Besides the adjustments made to the balance of performance, four entries also enter Silverstone carrying further ballast due to their success in Abu Dhabi. The No. 5 Matech Ford which won the Championship Race in Abu Dhabi will carry 40 kg (88 lb), while the No. 13 and No. 14 Phoenix Corvettes and No. 1 Vitaphone Maserati will also have success weight. The field for the event has also been diminished by one with the absence of the No. 6 Matech Ford following its heavy crash in qualifying at Abu Dhabi and the continuing recovery of its driver Natacha Gachnang. Matech drivers Romain Grosjean and Thomas Mutsch let the Drivers Championship with 33 points, five ahead of Phoenix drivers Marc Hennerici and Andreas Zuber. Phoenix Racing / Carsport meanwhile led the Teams Championship with 41 points ahead of Matech's 31.

Following the 2010 eruptions of Eyjafjallajökull that caused disruption to air travel in Europe, the organiser of the FIA GT1 World Championship, Stéphane Ratel Organisation, expressed worries that cargo planes carrying cars and equipment would not be able to be transported to the United Kingdom. Nonetheless, two cargo planes were able to land in Luxembourg on the morning of 22 April and two charter flights arrived in Austria later that day, allowing the race to continue as scheduled.

The 2010 running of the RAC Tourist Trophy included four former winners of the event, included two-time defending winner Karl Wendlinger attempting to win his third in succession. Vitaphone drivers Michael Bartels and Andrea Bertolini previously shared the win in 2006 while Peter Kox won the event in 2005.

== Qualifying ==
The GT1 qualifying session was held early on Saturday, 1 May, with all 23 participants taking part in the initial twenty-minute first session. By the end of the first quarter of the session, local driver Oliver Gavin in the No. 12 Mad-Croc Corvette led the field with the fastest time of the weekend, the first lap under the 2:01 mark, then breaking under an even 2:00 within his next few laps. Halfway through the session the No. 37 Münnich Lamborghini of Christophe Bouchut and No. 3 Swiss Nissan of Karl Wendlinger came into contact with one another at the Brooklands corner, leading both cars to spin to a stop but eventually resume. With less than four minutes left in the session, the No. 8 Young Driver Aston Martin, driven by Stefan Mücke, went to the top of the time charts with a lap of 1:59.694 where it would remain until the session ended. On the final lap of the session, Jos Menten in the Reiter Lamborghini climbed out of the bottom seven times, staving off elimination. The seven slowest cars at the end of the session, which are knocked out of the qualifying session per GT1 regulations, included both Marc VDS Fords, both Münnich Lamborghinis, both Swiss Nissans, and the No. 11 Mad-Croc Corvette.

For the first time in the FIA GT1 World Championship, qualifying reached the second session, with the sixteen remaining cars running for fifteen minutes. Anthony Kumpen, driving the No. 14 Phoenix Corvette led the session early before having the top spot taken by a quick succession of drivers. Michael Bartels initially took the lead in the No. 1 Vitaphone Maserati, then was overtaken on the time charts by Peter Dumbreck in the No. 23 Sumo Power Nissan, before Frank Kechele in the No. 25 Reiter Lamborghini led the field less than a minute later. With approximately three minutes left in the session, Jonathan Hirschi put the No. 10 Hexis Aston Martin on top with a time of 1:59.796 and would be able to maintain the first position as the session came to an end. Teams knocked out at the end of the session included both Phoenix Corvettes and both Hegersport Maseratis, the No. 2 Vitaphone Maserati and No. 12 Mad-Croc Corvette, as well as the championship-leading No 5. Matech Ford and the No. 8 Young Driver Aston Martin which had been quickest in the first qualifying session.

Eight cars remained for the final ten-minute session, with Frédéric Makowiecki in the No. 9 Hexis Aston Martin setting the early pace with the first lap under 2:00. As the qualifying session ended and the cars completed their final flying lap, Darren Turner, who only brought the No. 7 Young Driver Aston Martin to the circuit in the final five minutes, earned pole position with a lap of 1:58.808, over four tenths of a second ahead of the No. 9 Hexis Aston Martin, giving Aston Martin the lead of all three qualifying sessions and a lockout of the front row of the grid, ahead of a Sumo Power Nissan and Vitaphone Maserati on the second row.

=== Qualifying result ===
For qualifying, Driver 1 participates in the first and third sessions while Driver 2 participates in only the second session. The fastest lap for each session is indicated with bold.

Pos	No.	Driver 1	Team	Session 1	Session 2	Session 3	Grid
Pos	No.	Driver 2	Team	Session 1	Session 2	Session 3	Grid
1	7	(United Kingdom) Darren Turner	(Germany) Young Driver AMR	2:00.076	2:00.089	1:58.808	1
1	7	(Czech Republic) Tomáš Enge	(Germany) Young Driver AMR	2:00.076	2:00.089	1:58.808	1
2	9	(France) Frédéric Makowiecki	(France) Hexis AMR	2:00.594	2:00.210	1:59.287	2
2	9	(France) Thomas Accary	(France) Hexis AMR	2:00.594	2:00.210	1:59.287	2
3	23	(Germany) Michael Krumm	(United Kingdom) Sumo Power GT	2:00.185	2:00.026	1:59.501	3
3	23	(United Kingdom) Peter Dumbreck	(United Kingdom) Sumo Power GT	2:00.185	2:00.026	1:59.501	3
4	1	(Italy) Andrea Bertolini	(Germany) Vitaphone Racing Team	2:00.293	1:59.990	1:59.775	4
4	1	(Germany) Michael Bartels	(Germany) Vitaphone Racing Team	2:00.293	1:59.990	1:59.775	4
5	22	(United Kingdom) Warren Hughes	(United Kingdom) Sumo Power GT	2:00.995	1:59.826	2:00.459	5
5	22	(United Kingdom) Jamie Campbell-Walter	(United Kingdom) Sumo Power GT	2:00.995	1:59.826	2:00.459	5
6	10	(Monaco) Clivio Piccione	(France) Hexis AMR	2:00.709	1:59.796	2:00.566	6
6	10	(Switzerland) Jonathan Hirschi	(France) Hexis AMR	2:00.709	1:59.796	2:00.566	6
7	25	(Netherlands) Jos Menten	(Germany) Reiter	2:00.851	1:59.876	2:00.641	7
7	25	(Germany) Frank Kechele	(Germany) Reiter	2:00.851	1:59.876	2:00.641	7
8	24	(Netherlands) Peter Kox	(Germany) Reiter	2:00.782	2:00.099	2:00.699	11^{1}
8	24	(Germany) Christopher Haase	(Germany) Reiter	2:00.782	2:00.099	2:00.699	11^{1}
9	13	(Austria) Andreas Zuber	(Germany) Phoenix Racing / Carsport	2:00.471	2:00.220		8
9	13	(Germany) Marc Hennerici	(Germany) Phoenix Racing / Carsport	2:00.471	2:00.220		8
10	8	(Germany) Stefan Mücke	(Germany) Young Driver AMR	1:59.694	2:00.335		9
10	8	(Denmark) Christoffer Nygaard	(Germany) Young Driver AMR	1:59.694	2:00.335		9
11	14	(Netherlands) Mike Hezemans	(Germany) Phoenix Racing / Carsport	2:00.856	2:00.637		10
11	14	(Belgium) Anthony Kumpen	(Germany) Phoenix Racing / Carsport	2:00.856	2:00.637		10
12	34	(Italy) Matteo Bobbi	(Germany) Triple H Team Hegersport	1:59.888	2:01.280		12
12	34	(Belgium) Bert Longin	(Germany) Triple H Team Hegersport	1:59.888	2:01.280		12
13	2	(Brazil) Enrique Bernoldi	(Germany) Vitaphone Racing Team	2:00.424	2:01.371		13
13	2	(Portugal) Miguel Ramos	(Germany) Vitaphone Racing Team	2:00.424	2:01.371		13
14	33	(Greece) Alexandros Margaritis	(Germany) Triple H Team Hegersport	1:59.868	2:01.899		14
14	33	(Germany) Altfrid Heger	(Germany) Triple H Team Hegersport	1:59.868	2:01.899		14
15	5	(Switzerland) Romain Grosjean	(Switzerland) Matech Competition	2:00.885	2:02.113		15
15	5	(Germany) Thomas Mutsch	(Switzerland) Matech Competition	2:00.885	2:02.113		15
16	12	(United Kingdom) Oliver Gavin	(Belgium) Mad-Croc Racing	1:59.861	2:02.287		16
16	12	(Finland) Pertti Kuismanen	(Belgium) Mad-Croc Racing	1:59.861	2:02.287		16
17	37	(France) Christophe Bouchut	(Germany) All-Inkl.com Münnich Motorsport	2:01.158			17
17	37	(Germany) Marc Basseng	(Germany) All-Inkl.com Münnich Motorsport	2:01.158			17
18	40	(Belgium) Bas Leinders	(Belgium) Marc VDS Racing Team	2:01.175			18
18	40	(Belgium) Maxime Martin	(Belgium) Marc VDS Racing Team	2:01.175			18
19	4	(Japan) Seiji Ara	(Switzerland) Swiss Racing Team	2:01.193			19
19	4	(Sweden) Max Nilsson	(Switzerland) Swiss Racing Team	2:01.193			19
20	11	(Netherlands) Xavier Maassen	(Belgium) Mad-Croc Racing	2:01.424			20
20	11	(France) Nicolas Armindo	(Belgium) Mad-Croc Racing	2:01.424			20
21	3	(Austria) Karl Wendlinger	(Switzerland) Swiss Racing Team	2:01.506			21
21	3	(Switzerland) Henri Moser	(Switzerland) Swiss Racing Team	2:01.506			21
22	41	(Finland) Markus Palttala	(Belgium) Marc VDS Racing Team	2:02.072			22
22	41	(Belgium) Renaud Kuppens	(Belgium) Marc VDS Racing Team	2:02.072			22
23	38	(Germany) Dominik Schwager	(Germany) All-Inkl.com Münnich Motorsport	2:02.929			23
23	38	(Netherlands) Nicky Pastorelli	(Germany) All-Inkl.com Münnich Motorsport	2:02.929			23

1. The No. 24 Reiter Lamborghini was given a penalty of three grid spots for crossing the pit entry line twice during qualifying.

== Races ==
=== Qualifying race ===
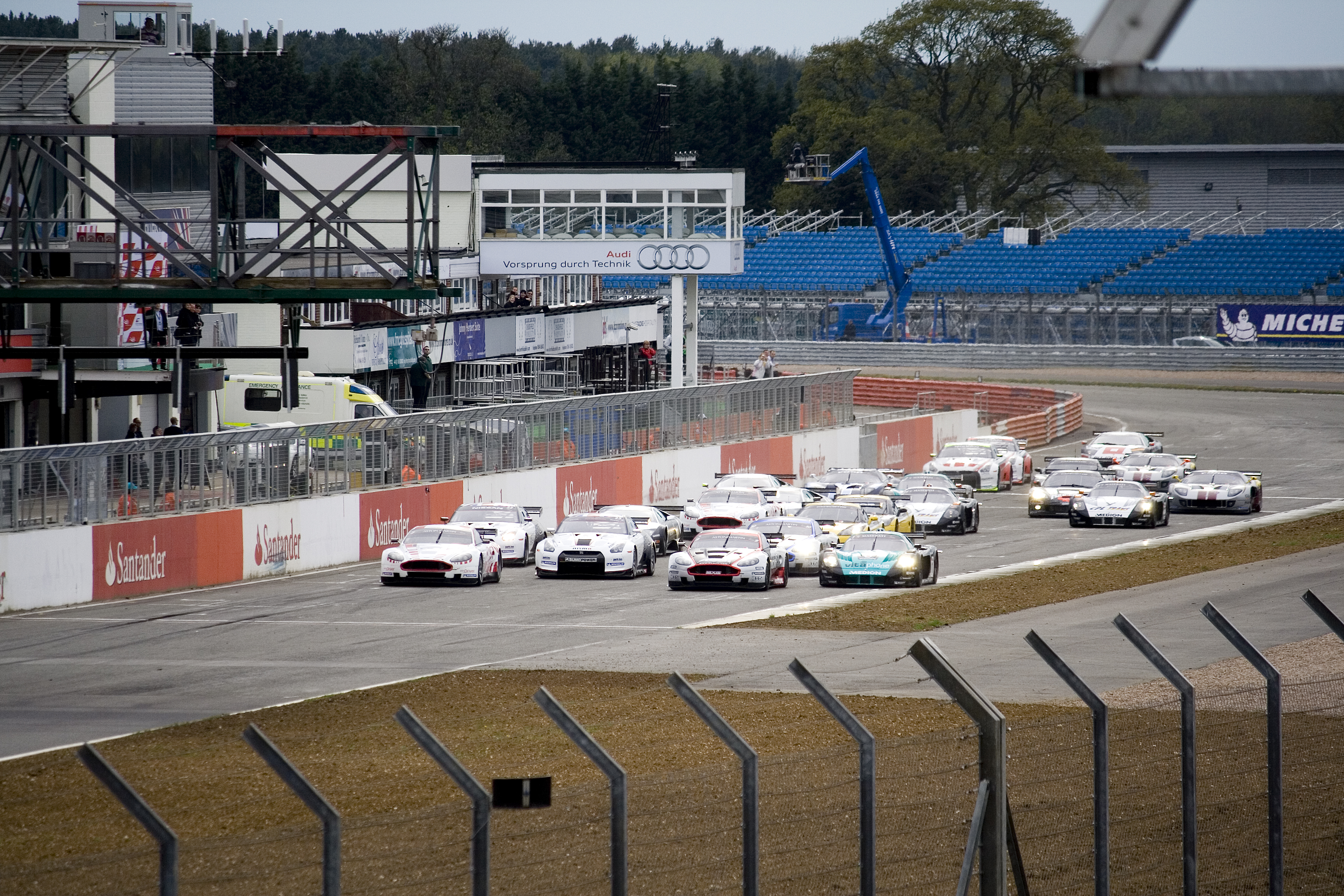
The start of the Qualifying Race

From the rolling start, the pole sitting No. 7 Young Driver Aston Martin of Tomáš Enge led the field as they battled into the first corner, jumping out ahead of the No 9 Hexis Aston Martin and No. 1 Vitaphone Maserati. Further down the field the No. 33 Hegersport Maserati spun in the middle of the first turn after hitting one of the Reiter Lamborghinis, which then made contact with the No. 8 Young Driver Aston Martin. The Aston Martin's left rear tyre was cut down by the contact and Christoffer Nygaard was forced to make an early pit stop for a new tyre. The Hegersport Maserati meanwhile, although briefly continuing, was forced to enter the team's garage several laps later with engine problems. On the tenth lap of the race, Abu Dhabi race winner Thomas Mutsch spun the No. 5 Matech Ford into a gravel trap outside Maggotts corner while defending 13th place. The Ford would lose a lap while being extracted and returning to the race.

By the time the pit window opened in the 25th minute, Enge led the field by over two seconds. Darren Turner was able to take over the No. 7 Aston Martin during the team's pit stop and retained the race lead but minutes later officials announced drive-thru penalties for the No. 7, No. 23 Sumo Power Nissan, and No. 34 Hegersport Maserati for all cutting the pit lane entry. All three returned to the pits to serve their penalty on the next lap, but while entering the pits Turner cut the entry and earned a stop-and-go penalty. After the two penalties the Young Driver Aston Martin had fallen to seventh, with the No 9 Hexis Aston Martin now leading. During pit stop window the No. 10 Hexis Aston Martin managed to take over second after the No. 1 Vitaphone Maserati stalled in the pits.

During the closing ten minutes of the race the two Swiss Nissans were attempting to catch the No. 37 Münnich Lamborghini for fourteenth place, but collided with one another in the Vale corner and spun Karl Wendlinger in the No. 3 car. Meanwhile, at the front of the field Darren Turner had begun to reclaim lost positions by passing the No. 23 Sumo Power Nissan for sixth place, then the No. 14 Phoenix Corvette for fifth. Turner would eventually claim the fourth position in the final two laps but would miss out on a podium finish for the race end. Hexis driver Frédéric Makowiecki led the field across the line for the race win, ahead of his teammate Clivio Piccione in second place, with the No. 1 Vitaphone Maserati in third.

==== Race result ====
Pos	No.	Team	Drivers	Manufacturer	Laps	Time/Retired
1	9	(France) Hexis AMR	(France) Thomas Accary (France) Frédéric Makowiecki	Aston Martin	30	
2	10	(France) Hexis AMR	(Monaco) Clivio Piccione (Switzerland) Jonathan Hirschi	Aston Martin	30	−3.577
3	1	(Germany) Vitaphone Racing Team	(Germany) Michael Bartels (Italy) Andrea Bertolini	Maserati	30	−4.935
4	7	(Germany) Young Driver AMR	(Czech Republic) Tomáš Enge (United Kingdom) Darren Turner	Aston Martin	30	−27.880
5	22	(United Kingdom) Sumo Power GT	(United Kingdom) Warren Hughes (United Kingdom) Jamie Campbell-Walter	Nissan	30	−29.745
6	25	(Germany) Reiter	(Germany) Frank Kechele (Netherlands) Jos Menten	Lamborghini	30	−33.488
7	14	(Germany) Phoenix Racing / Carsport	(Netherlands) Mike Hezemans (Belgium) Anthony Kumpen	Corvette	30	−40.752
8	23	(United Kingdom) Sumo Power GT	(United Kingdom) Peter Dumbreck (Germany) Michael Krumm	Nissan	30	−40.852
9	2	(Germany) Vitaphone Racing Team	(Portugal) Miguel Ramos (Brazil) Enrique Bernoldi	Maserati	30	−47.687
10	24	(Germany) Reiter	(Netherlands) Peter Kox (Germany) Christopher Haase	Lamborghini	30	−49.958
11	13	(Germany) Phoenix Racing / Carsport	(Germany) Marc Hennerici (Austria) Andreas Zuber	Corvette	30	−50.581
12	11	(Belgium) Mad-Croc Racing	(Netherlands) Xavier Maassen (France) Nicolas Armindo	Corvette	30	−1:06.514
13	12	(Belgium) Mad-Croc Racing	(Finland) Pertti Kuismanen (United Kingdom) Oliver Gavin	Corvette	30	−1:10.589
14	4	(Switzerland) Swiss Racing Team	(Sweden) Max Nilsson (Japan) Seiji Ara	Nissan	30	−1:19.057
15	3	(Switzerland) Swiss Racing Team	(Austria) Karl Wendlinger (Switzerland) Henri Moser	Nissan	30	−1:27.997
16	34	(Germany) Triple H Team Hegersport	(Belgium) Bert Longin (Italy) Matteo Bobbi	Maserati	30	−1:29.062
17	37	(Germany) All-Inkl.com Münnich Motorsport	(Germany) Marc Basseng (France) Christophe Bouchut	Lamborghini	30	−1:31.319
18	41	(Belgium) Marc VDS Racing Team	(Belgium) Renaud Kuppens (Finland) Markus Palttala	Ford	29	−1 Lap
19	40	(Belgium) Marc VDS Racing Team	(Belgium) Bas Leinders (Belgium) Maxime Martin	Ford	29	−1 Lap
20	38	(Germany) All-Inkl.com Münnich Motorsport	(Netherlands) Nicky Pastorelli (Germany) Dominik Schwager	Lamborghini	29	−1 Lap
21	5	(Switzerland) Matech Competition	(Germany) Thomas Mutsch (Switzerland) Romain Grosjean	Ford	28	−2 Laps
22 NC	33	(Germany) Triple H Team Hegersport	(Germany) Altfrid Heger (Greece) Alexandros Margaritis	Maserati	21	−9 Laps
23 DNF	8	(Germany) Young Driver AMR	(Germany) Stefan Mücke (Denmark) Christoffer Nygaard	Aston Martin	14	Retired

=== Championship race ===
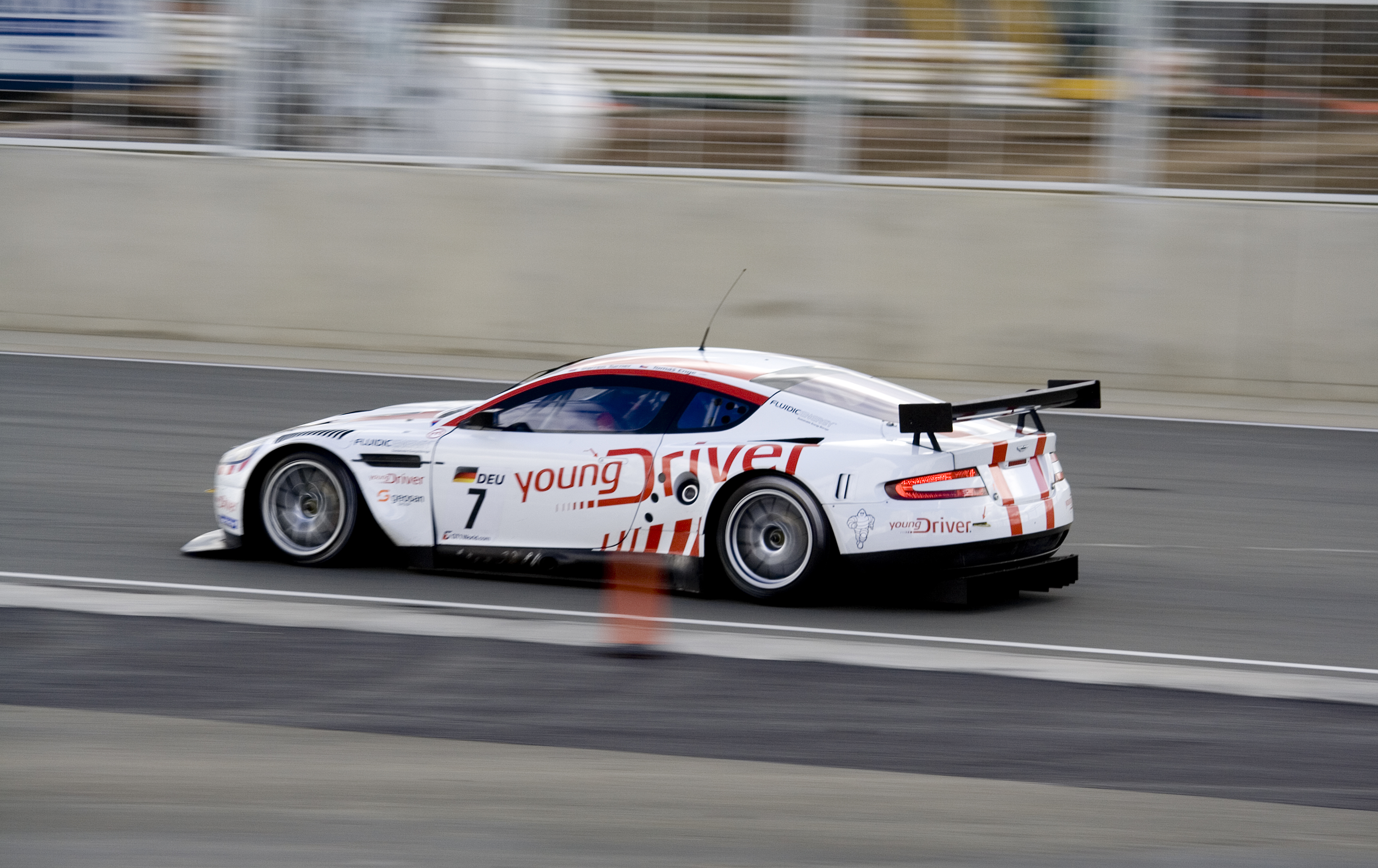
The No. 7 Young Driver Aston Martin was the initial Championship Race winner prior to exclusion

The Sunday Championship Race was held under colder damp conditions than Saturday's Qualifying Race, with the grid lining up in their finishing positions from the previous day. Four cars were awarded penalties by the race stewards following Saturday's race and demoted five grid positions from original position; both Mad-Croc Corvettes as well as the No. 24 Reiter Lamborghini were demoted, while the No. 8 Young Driver Aston Martin was already starting from the back of the field.

At the start of the race Hexis' Jonathan Hirschi led into the first corner, followed by teammate and polesitter Frédéric Makowiecki and the fellow Aston Martin of Darren Turner. Andrea Bertolini in the No. 1 Vitaphone Maserati slipped from his third place grid position to seventh. Towards the back of the field Romain Grosjean was hit from behind by the No. 33 Hegersport Maserati, bouncing the Ford into the side of the No. 8 Young Driver Aston Martin and Grosjean to spin to the outside of the first turn. Suspension damaged in the accident would render the Ford unable to restart the race. During the second lap Hirschi ran wide at the Stowe corner and allowed Makoweicki to take over the race lead, while Warren Hughes took fourth place from Jos Menten's Reiter Lamborghini. As the race entered the third lap, the No. 8 Young Driver Aston Martin was forced to make a pit stop to replace a tyre punctured in the earlier incident while the No. 14 Phoenix Racing Corvette began to billow smoke on the Hangar Straight. Mike Hezemans spun the Corvette and came to a stop where the rear of car became enveloped in flames. While Hezemans successfully exited the car, the clean-up by track officials required the intervention of the safety car, neutralizing the race.

The safety car was withdrawn on the seventh lap and Makowiecki once again led the field.

==== Race result ====
Pos	No.	Team	Drivers	Manufacturer	Laps	Time/Retired
1	22	(United Kingdom) Sumo Power GT	(United Kingdom) Warren Hughes (United Kingdom) Jamie Campbell-Walter	Nissan	28	
2	9	(France) Hexis AMR	(France) Thomas Accary (France) Frédéric Makowiecki	Aston Martin	28	−1.885
3	25	(Germany) Reiter	(Germany) Frank Kechele (Netherlands) Jos Menten	Lamborghini	28	−10.284
4	34	(Germany) Triple H Team Hegersport	(Belgium) Bert Longin (Italy) Matteo Bobbi	Maserati	28	−10.875
5	8	(Germany) Young Driver AMR	(Germany) Stefan Mücke (Denmark) Christoffer Nygaard	Aston Martin	28	−11.051
6	33	(Germany) Triple H Team Hegersport	(Germany) Altfrid Heger (Greece) Alexandros Margaritis	Maserati	28	−11.787
7	1	(Germany) Vitaphone Racing Team	(Germany) Michael Bartels (Italy) Andrea Bertolini	Maserati	28	−19.310
8	40	(Belgium) Marc VDS Racing Team	(Belgium) Bas Leinders (Belgium) Maxime Martin	Ford	28	−22.413
9	4	(Switzerland) Swiss Racing Team	(Sweden) Max Nilsson (Japan) Seiji Ara	Nissan	28	−27.708
10	41	(Belgium) Marc VDS Racing Team	(Belgium) Renaud Kuppens (Finland) Markus Palttala	Ford	28	−28.790
11	11	(Belgium) Mad-Croc Racing	(Netherlands) Xavier Maassen (France) Nicolas Armindo	Corvette	28	−35.507
12	38	(Germany) All-Inkl.com Münnich Motorsport	(Netherlands) Nicky Pastorelli (Germany) Dominik Schwager	Lamborghini	28	−58.724
13	10	(France) Hexis AMR	(Monaco) Clivio Piccione (Switzerland) Jonathan Hirschi	Aston Martin	28	−1:25.799
14	12	(Belgium) Mad-Croc Racing	(Finland) Pertti Kuismanen (United Kingdom) Oliver Gavin	Corvette	25	−3 Laps
15	2	(Germany) Vitaphone Racing Team	(Portugal) Miguel Ramos (Brazil) Enrique Bernoldi	Maserati	24	−4 Laps
16 DNF	24	(Germany) Reiter	(Netherlands) Peter Kox (Germany) Christopher Haase	Lamborghini	16	Puncture
17 DNF	3	(Switzerland) Swiss Racing Team	(Austria) Karl Wendlinger (Switzerland) Henri Moser	Nissan	16	Accident
18 DNF	13	(Germany) Phoenix Racing / Carsport	(Germany) Marc Hennerici (Austria) Andreas Zuber	Corvette	15	Engine
19 DNF	23	(United Kingdom) Sumo Power GT	(United Kingdom) Peter Dumbreck (Germany) Michael Krumm	Nissan	10	Collision
20 DNF	14	(Germany) Phoenix Racing / Carsport	(Netherlands) Mike Hezemans (Belgium) Anthony Kumpen	Corvette	2	Fire
21 DNF	37	(Germany) All-Inkl.com Münnich Motorsport	(Germany) Marc Basseng (France) Christophe Bouchut	Lamborghini	1	Retired
22 DNF	5	(Switzerland) Matech Competition	(Germany) Thomas Mutsch (Switzerland) Romain Grosjean	Ford	0	Collision
EX	7	(Germany) Young Driver AMR	(Czech Republic) Tomáš Enge (United Kingdom) Darren Turner	Aston Martin	28	Excluded

== Post-event ==
Despite failing to finish the championship race and earning no points in either race Thomas Mutsch and Romain Grosjean were able to sustain their lead in the Drivers Championship by a margin of five points, aided by a lack of points earned by Marc Hennerici and Andreas Zuber. However podium finishes in the Qualifying and Championship races have elevated Hexis drivers Frédéric Makowiecki and Thomas Accary and Vitaphone drivers Michael Bartels and Andrea Bertolini to even points with Hennerici and Zuber. Jamie Campbell-Walter and Warren Hughes, by winning the Championship race and earning their first points for the season, now sit fifth in the Drivers Championship.

As in the Drivers Championship, Phoenix Racing / Carsport retained the Teams Championship lead without gaining any points at Silverstone. Vitaphone Racing Team moved from third to second after earning points in both the Qualifying and Championship Races, while Hexis AMR's three podiums in the two races promoted them to third in the standings.

=== Standings ===
Drivers Championship standings

Pos	Driver(s)	Points
1	(Switzerland) Romain Grosjean (Germany) Thomas Mutsch	31
2	(France) Frédéric Makowiecki (France) Thomas Accary	26
3	(Germany) Marc Hennerici (Austria) Andreas Zuber	26
4	(Germany) Michael Bartels (Italy) Andrea Bertolini	26
5	(United Kingdom) Warren Hughes (United Kingdom) Jamie Campbell-Walter	25

Teams Championship standings

Pos	Team	Points
1	(Germany) Phoenix Racing / Carsport	41
2	(Germany) Vitaphone Racing Team	34
3	(France) Hexis AMR	32
4	(Switzerland) Matech Competition	31
5	(Germany) Reiter	29

FIA GT1 World Championship
Previous race: Abu Dhabi	2010 season	Next race: Brno
