= Vitaphone (disambiguation) =

"Vitaphone" can refer to:

== Film ==
- Vitaphone Corp., the name for Vitagraph Studios after being bought by Warner Bros. in 1925
- Vitaphone – a sound-on-disc system for films, used in the 1920s
- The Vitaphone Project, film soundtrack disc restoration group

== German organizations ==
- Vitaphone GmbH – a German telecommunications company which supplies hospitals
- Vitaphone Racing – a German racing team sponsored by Vitaphone GmbH
