= Clivio Piccione =

Monegasque racing driver (born 1984)

- Nationality: (Monaco) Monégasque
- Born: February 24, 1984 (age 42) Monte Carlo, Monaco
- Categorisation: FIA Silver

Previous series
- 2010-2011 2007 2006-2005 2004-2003 2002 2001: FIA GT1 World Championship; World Series by Renault; GP2 Series; British Formula 3 British F3 National Class; British Formula Ford

Clivio Piccione (born February 24, 1984, in Monte Carlo, Monaco) is a Monégasque race car driver. He raced in the 2005 GP2 Series season for the Durango team and David Price Racing for 2006.

== Career ==
Piccione's career started in karting in 1997, where he stayed until 2001 before moving up to British Formula Ford. He only spent one season there, debuting in British Formula 3's B-Class in 2002 for the T-Sport team. 2003 saw him move up to the main class with the Manor team, where he won the a race at Knockhill. For 2004, he joined Carlin Motorsport and won two races at Donington Park.

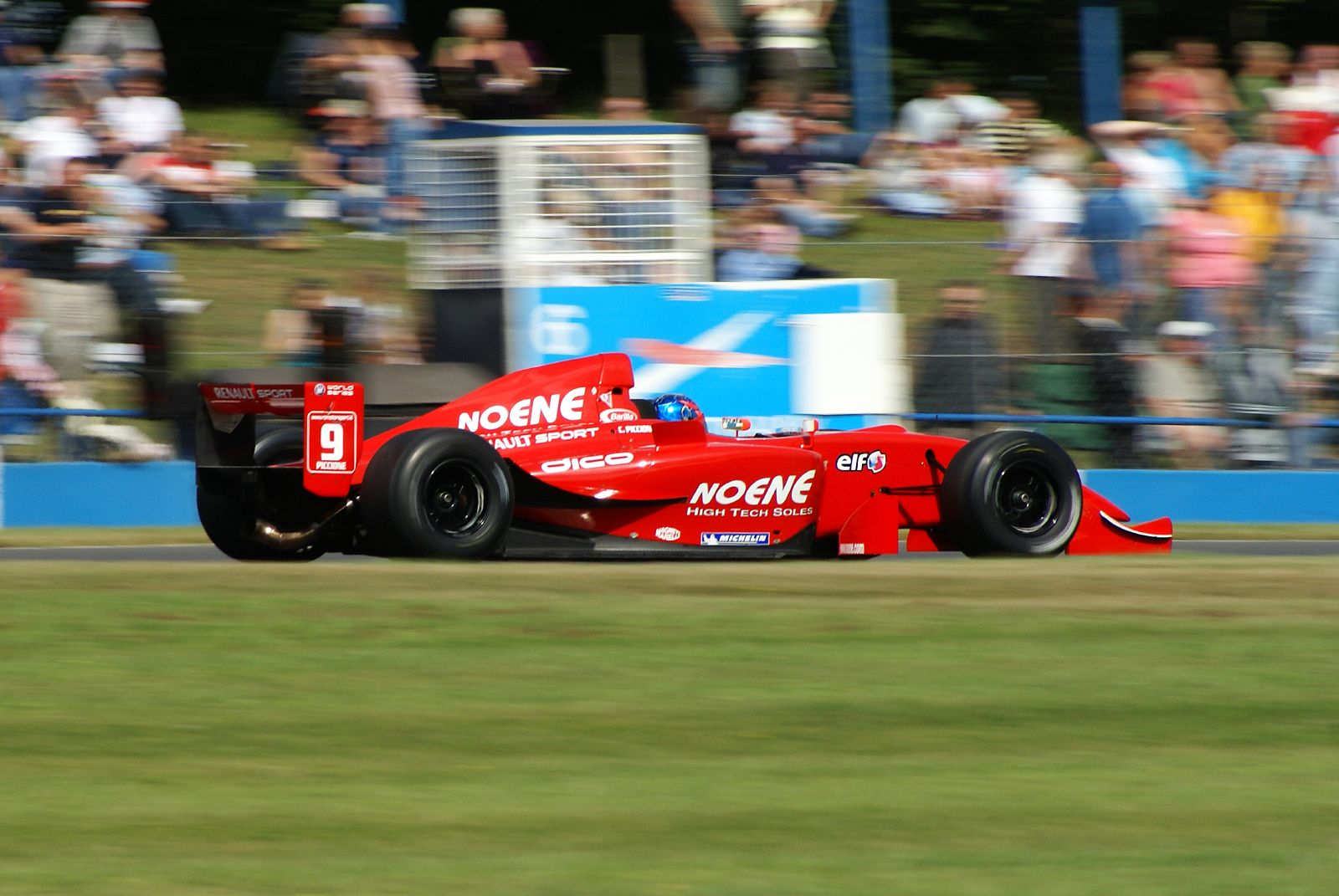
Piccione racing in World Series by Renault in 2007

In 2005, Piccione drove in the inaugural GP2 Series season, driving for the Durango team, winning the sprint race at the Nürburgring round. However, results were not in his favour for the remainder of the season and for 2006 he would switch to DPR Direxiv. He would score two podiums for the team at Silverstone and Monza. After leaving GP2, he competed in the World Series by Renault for 2007. In 2008, he raced in F3000 Euroseries, Italian F3000 and EuroBOSS.

Piccione drove in the 2008-09 A1 Grand Prix season for the newly formed A1 Team Monaco. He was the nation's joint seat-holder, alongside Hubertus Bahlsen. He competed in all races in the 2008-09 season, scoring pole for the South African feature race and finishing a best of third place in the same race. Team Monaco finished 9th overall with 35 points.

Following the cancellation of the 2009–10 A1 Grand Prix season, Piccione represented Monaco at the 2009 Race of Champions, then joined Hexis AMR in the FIA GT1 Championship. He competed for the team across 2010 and 2011, driving their Aston Martin DBR9. The best result was victory in 2011 at the Yas Marina Circuit.

Following his racing career, Piccione designed the Kart Indoor Monaco in Fontvieille. In 2018, he drove a McLaren M14A in the Monaco Historic Grand Prix. In 2022, he was behind the formation of the Monaco E-Kart Championship, with backing from Monegasque Formula 1 driver Charles Leclerc.

== Racing record ==
=== Complete British Formula Three Championship results ===
(key) (Races in bold indicate pole position) (Races in italics indicate fastest lap)

Year	Entrant	Chassis	Engine	Class	1	2	3	4	5	6	7	8	9	10	11	12	13	14	15	16	17	18	19	20	21	22	23	24	25	26	27	DC	Points
2002	T-Sport	Dallara F301	Mugen-Honda	Scholarship	BRH; 1; 23	**BRH**; **2**; 23†	DON; 1; 12	DON; 2; 9	SIL; 1 Ret	SIL; 2; 15	KNO; 1; 18	KNO; 2 Ret	CRO; 1; 11	CRO; 2 C	SIL; 1; 9	SIL; 2 Ret	CAS; 1; 15	CAS; 2; 10	**BRH**; **1**; 21	**BRH**; **2** Ret	ROC; 1; 19	ROC; 2; 14	OUL; 1; 8	OUL; 2; 4	SNE; 1; 18	**SNE**; **2** Ret	SNE; 3; 8	THR; 1 Ret	THR; 2; 15	DON; 1; 10	DON; 2; 15	2nd	249
2003	Manor Motorsport	Dallara F303	Mugen-Honda	Championship	DON; 1; 8	DON; 2; 14	SNE; 1; 7	SNE; 2; 9	CRO; 1; 14	CRO; 2 Ret	**KNO**; **1**; 1	KNO; 2; 14	SIL; 1; 9	SIL; 2; 9	CAS; 1; 6	CAS; 2; 6	OUL; 1 Ret	OUL; 2; 6	ROC; 1; 2	ROC; 2; 4	THR; 1; 12	THR; 2; 19	SPA; 1; 27	SPA; 2; 12	DON; 1; 9	DON; 2 Ret	BRH; 1; 12	BRH; 2; 19				11th	84
2004	Carlin Motorsport	Dallara F304	Mugen-Honda	Championship	DON; 1; 12	DON; 2; 1	SIL; 1; 6	SIL; 2 C	CRO; 1; 9	CRO; 2; 4	KNO; 1; 5	KNO; 2 Ret	SNE; 1; 8	SNE; 2; 9	SNE; 3; 11	CAS; 1; 2	CAS; 2; 4	DON; 1; 2	DON; 2; 1	OUL; 1; 8	OUL; 2 Ret	SIL; 1; 10	SIL; 2 Ret	THR; 1; 4	THR; 2; 6	SPA; 1; 2	SPA; 2; 2	BRH; 1; 11	**BRH**; **2**; 18			4th	161

=== Complete GP2 Series results ===
(key) (Races in bold indicate pole position) (Races in italics indicate fastest lap)

Year	Entrant	1	2	3	4	5	6	7	8	9	10	11	12	13	14	15	16	17	18	19	20	21	22	23	DC	Points
2005	Durango	IMO; FEA; 15	IMO; SPR; Ret	CAT; FEA; Ret	CAT; SPR; 8	MON; FEA; Ret	NÜR; FEA; 7	NÜR; SPR; 1	MAG; FEA; 8	MAG; SPR; DSQ	SIL; FEA; 6	SIL; SPR; Ret	HOC; FEA; Ret	HOC; SPR; 17	HUN; FEA; Ret	HUN; SPR; 16	IST; FEA; Ret	IST; SPR; 11	MNZ; FEA; 11	MNZ; SPR; 14	SPA; FEA; 12	SPA; SPR; 19	BHR; FEA; 13	BHR; SPR; 7	15th	14
2006	DPR Direxiv	VAL; FEA; Ret	VAL; SPR; Ret	IMO; FEA; Ret	IMO; SPR; 16	NÜR; FEA; 11	NÜR; SPR; Ret	CAT; FEA; 16†	CAT; SPR; Ret	MON; FEA; 4	SIL; FEA; 7	SIL; SPR; 3	MAG; FEA; 13	MAG; SPR; Ret	HOC; FEA; 8	HOC; SPR; Ret	HUN; FEA; Ret	HUN; SPR; Ret	IST; FEA; Ret	IST; SPR; Ret	MNZ; FEA; 7	MNZ; SPR; 3			12th	18

=== Complete Formula Renault 3.5 Series results ===
(key) (Races in bold indicate pole position) (Races in italics indicate fastest lap)

Year	Team	1	2	3	4	5	6	7	8	9	10	11	12	13	14	15	16	17	Pos	Points
2007	RC Motorsport	MNZ; 1 Ret	MNZ; 2 Ret	NÜR; 1 Ret	NÜR; 2; 23	MON; 1 Ret	HUN; 1; 11	HUN; 2; 5	SPA; 1; 19†	SPA; 2; 15	DON; 1 Ret	DON; 2 Ret	**MAG**; **1**; 3	MAG; 2; 7	EST; 1; 10	**EST**; **2**; 2	CAT; 1; 17	CAT; 2; 22	15th	42

^{†} Driver did not finish the race, but was classified as he completed more than 90% of the race distance.

=== Complete Euroseries 3000 results ===
(key) (Races in bold indicate pole position) (Races in italics indicate fastest lap)

Year	Team	1	2	3	4	5	6	7	8	9	10	11	12	13	14	15	16	Pos	Points
2008	TP Formula	VLL; 1	VLL; 2	SPA; 1	SPA; 2	VAL; 1	VAL; 2	MUG; 1	MUG; 2	MIS; 1; 2	MIS; 2; 4	JER; 1	JER; 2	CAT; 1	CAT; 2	MAG; 1	MAG; 2	11th	12
2009	TP Formula	ALG; 1; 6	ALG; 2; 4	MAG; 1	MAG; 2	DON; 1	DON; 2	ZOL; 1	ZOL; 2	VAL; 1	VAL; 2	VAL; 3	VLL; 1	VLL; 2	MNZ; 1	MNZ; 2		12th	8

=== Complete A1 Grand Prix results ===
(key) (Races in bold indicate pole position) (Races in italics indicate fastest lap)

Year	Entrant	1	2	3	4	5	6	7	8	9	10	11	12	13	14	DC	Points
2008–09	Monaco	NED; SPR; Ret	NED; FEA; 6	CHN; SPR; 9	CHN; FEA; 7	MYS; SPR; 12	MYS; FEA; Ret	NZL; SPR; 16	NZL; FEA; Ret	RSA; SPR; 5	**RSA**; **FEA**; 3	POR; SPR; 5	POR; FEA; Ret	GBR; SPR; Ret	GBR; SPR; 4	9th	35

=== Complete GT1 World Championship results ===
Year	Team	Car	1	2	3	4	5	6	7	8	9	10	11	12	13	14	15	16	17	18	19	20	Pos	Points
2010	Hexis AMR	Aston Martin DBR9	ABU; QR; 8	ABU; CR; 17	SIL; QR; 2	SIL; CR; 13	BRN; QR; 9	BRN; CR; 4	PRI; QR; 17	PRI; CR; 13	SPA; QR; 13	SPA; CR; 10	NÜR; QR; 5	NÜR; CR; 4	ALG; QR; 16	ALG; CR; 13	NAV; QR; EX	NAV; CR; Ret	INT; QR; 3	INT; CR; 4	SAN; QR; 4	SAN; CR; 3	12th	62
2011	Hexis AMR	Aston Martin DBR9	ABU; QR; 5	ABU; CR; 1	ZOL; QR; 6	ZOL; CR; 6	ALG; QR; 13	ALG; CR; Ret	SAC; QR; 2	SAC; CR; 11	SIL; QR; 5	SIL; CR; 4	NAV; QR; 10	NAV; CR; 8	PRI; QR; Ret	PRI; CR; 11	ORD; QR; 4	ORD; CR; 3	BEI; QR; 5	BEI; CR; Ret	SAN; QR; 8	SAN; CR; 3	7th	95
