= 2010 FIA GT1 Abu Dhabi round =

Yas Marina Circuit (2009–2021)

The 2010 FIA GT1 Abu Dhabi round was an auto race held at the Yas Marina Circuit, Abu Dhabi, United Arab Emirates on 16–17 April 2010. It served as the opening round of the 2010 FIA GT1 World Championship season, and the inaugural race of the FIA GT1 World Championship series. It was the first sports car race designated by the Fédération Internationale de l'Automobile (FIA) as a world championship event since the 500 km of Magny-Cours held on 18 October 1992. Swiss driver Romain Grosjean and German driver Thomas Mutsch won the championship race for Matech Competition Ford, ahead of the two Phoenix Racing Corvettes which completed the podium. The Phoenix Corvette of Marc Hennerici and Andreas Zuber had won the qualifying race held earlier that day. The UAE Touring Car Championship will serve as a support series for this event.

== Qualifying ==
Qualifying began under the flood lights of Yas Marina Circuit, the entire session being held late on 16 April. All 24 cars took to the track during the first 20-minute session, with Michael Krumm sitting on top of the field in the early minutes. Frédéric Makowiecki was able to take over the pole position from the Nissan, the first driver to set a lap in the 2:07 range, quickly followed by the Vitaphone Maserati of Enrique Bernoldi less than a tenth of a second behind. In the second half of the session Andreas Zuber was able to jump to the top in the Phoenix Corvette, beating Makowiecki's lap by just under a full second and the only driver to set a lap under 2:07.

Toward the end of the session, Matech driver Natacha Gachnang crashed out on the back straight of Yas Marina, running off the end of the straight and impacting the safety barriers head-on. The session was stopped with just over two minutes remaining while safety crews attended to Gachnang, who was later airlifted from the circuit for medical attention and reported to have fractured her right leg. A camera operator situated behind the safety barrier also sustained injuries when his television camera hit him in the face due to the impact. The first session was delayed while Gachnang was attended to until it was announced approximately a half-hour later that repairs to the safety barriers could take up to three hours. The FIA race director then cancelled not only the remainder of the first session, but the entire second and third sessions as well. This awarded Zuber and his teammate Marc Hennerici pole position for the following day's qualifying race, while all other drivers remained in their positions due to the knock-out element of qualifying behind eliminated.

=== Qualifying result ===
For qualifying, Driver 1 participates in the first and third sessions while Driver 2 participates in only the second session. However, due to the cancellation of Sessions 2 and 3 for this event, only the Driver 1 participated in this qualifying session.

| Pos | No. | Driver 1 | Team | Session 1 | Grid |
| Pos | No. | Driver 2 | Team | Session 1 | Grid |
|---|---|---|---|---|---|
| 1 | 13 | (Austria) Andreas Zuber | (Germany) Phoenix Racing / Carsport | 2:06.780 | 1 |
| 1 | 13 | (Germany) Marc Hennerici | (Germany) Phoenix Racing / Carsport | 2:06.780 | 1 |
| 2 | 9 | (France) Frédéric Makowiecki | (France) Hexis AMR | 2:07.705 | 2 |
| 2 | 9 | (France) Philippe Dumas | (France) Hexis AMR | 2:07.705 | 2 |
| 3 | 2 | (Brazil) Enrique Bernoldi | (Germany) Vitaphone Racing Team | 2:07.763 | 3 |
| 3 | 2 | (Portugal) Miguel Ramos | (Germany) Vitaphone Racing Team | 2:07.763 | 3 |
| 4 | 11 | (Netherlands) Xavier Maassen | (Belgium) Mad-Croc Racing | 2:08.049 | 4 |
| 4 | 11 | (Germany) Alex Müller | (Belgium) Mad-Croc Racing | 2:08.049 | 4 |
| 5 | 1 | (Germany) Michael Bartels | (Germany) Vitaphone Racing Team | 2:08.070 | 5 |
| 5 | 1 | (Italy) Andrea Bertolini | (Germany) Vitaphone Racing Team | 2:08.070 | 5 |
| 6 | 12 | (Finland) Mika Salo | (Belgium) Mad-Croc Racing | 2:08.078 | 6 |
| 6 | 12 | (Finland) Pertti Kuismanen | (Belgium) Mad-Croc Racing | 2:08.078 | 6 |
| 7 | 24 | (Netherlands) Peter Kox | (Germany) Reiter | 2:08.090 | 7 |
| 7 | 24 | (Germany) Christopher Haase | (Germany) Reiter | 2:08.090 | 7 |
| 8 | 7 | (United Kingdom) Darren Turner | (Germany) Young Driver AMR | 2:08.143 | 8 |
| 8 | 7 | (Czech Republic) Tomáš Enge | (Germany) Young Driver AMR | 2:08.143 | 8 |
| 9 | 23 | (Germany) Michael Krumm | (United Kingdom) Sumo Power GT | 2:08.287 | 9 |
| 9 | 23 | (United Kingdom) Peter Dumbreck | (United Kingdom) Sumo Power GT | 2:08.287 | 9 |
| 10 | 40 | (Belgium) Bas Leinders | (Belgium) Marc VDS Racing Team | 2:08.322 | 10 |
| 10 | 40 | (Belgium) Maxime Martin | (Belgium) Marc VDS Racing Team | 2:08.322 | 10 |
| 11 | 5 | (Germany) Thomas Mutsch | (Switzerland) Matech Competition | 2:08.463 | 11 |
| 11 | 5 | (Switzerland) Romain Grosjean | (Switzerland) Matech Competition | 2:08.463 | 11 |
| 12 | 33 | (Greece) Alexandros Margaritis | (Germany) Triple H Team Hegersport | 2:08.494 | 12 |
| 12 | 33 | (Germany) Altfrid Heger | (Germany) Triple H Team Hegersport | 2:08.494 | 12 |
| 13 | 4 | (Japan) Seiji Ara | (Switzerland) Swiss Racing Team | 2:08.610 | 13 |
| 13 | 4 | (Sweden) Max Nilsson | (Switzerland) Swiss Racing Team | 2:08.610 | 13 |
| 14 | 3 | (Austria) Karl Wendlinger | (Switzerland) Swiss Racing Team | 2:08.652 | 14 |
| 14 | 3 | (Switzerland) Henri Moser | (Switzerland) Swiss Racing Team | 2:08.652 | 14 |
| 15 | 41 | (Finland) Markus Palttala | (Belgium) Marc VDS Racing Team | 2:08.737 | 15 |
| 15 | 41 | (Belgium) Renaud Kuppens | (Belgium) Marc VDS Racing Team | 2:08.737 | 15 |
| 16 | 34 | (Italy) Matteo Bobbi | (Germany) Triple H Team Hegersport | 2:08.787 | 16 |
| 16 | 34 | (Belgium) Bert Longin | (Germany) Triple H Team Hegersport | 2:08.787 | 16 |
| 17 | 37 | (Germany) Thomas Jäger | (Germany) All-Inkl.com Münnich Motorsport | 2:08.798 | 17 |
| 17 | 37 | (Germany) Marc Basseng | (Germany) All-Inkl.com Münnich Motorsport | 2:08.798 | 17 |
| 18 | 10 | (Monaco) Clivio Piccione | (France) Hexis AMR | 2:09.046 | 18 |
| 18 | 10 | (Switzerland) Jonathan Hirschi | (France) Hexis AMR | 2:09.046 | 18 |
| 19 | 22 | (United Kingdom) Warren Hughes | (United Kingdom) Sumo Power GT | 2:09.446 | 19 |
| 19 | 22 | (United Kingdom) Jamie Campbell-Walter | (United Kingdom) Sumo Power GT | 2:09.446 | 19 |
| 20 | 8 | (Denmark) Christoffer Nygaard | (Germany) Young Driver AMR | 2:09.629 | 20 |
| 20 | 8 | (Germany) Stefan Mücke | (Germany) Young Driver AMR | 2:09.629 | 20 |
| 21 | 6 | (Switzerland) Natacha Gachnang | (Switzerland) Matech Competition | 2:09.964 | 21 |
| 21 | 6 | (Switzerland) Cyndie Allemann | (Switzerland) Matech Competition | 2:09.964 | 21 |
| 22 | 25 | (Brazil) Ricardo Zonta | (Germany) Reiter | 2:10.261 | 22 |
| 22 | 25 | (Brazil) Rafael Daniel | (Germany) Reiter | 2:10.261 | 22 |
| 23 | 38 | (Netherlands) Nicky Pastorelli | (Germany) All-Inkl.com Münnich Motorsport | 2:10.628 | 23 |
| 23 | 38 | (Germany) Dominik Schwager | (Germany) All-Inkl.com Münnich Motorsport | 2:10.628 | 23 |
| 24 | 14 | (Netherlands) Mike Hezemans | (Germany) Phoenix Racing / Carsport | 2:16.352 | 24 |
| 24 | 14 | (Italy) Andrea Piccini | (Germany) Phoenix Racing / Carsport | 2:16.352 | 24 |

== Races ==
=== Qualifying race ===
The first FIA GT1 World Championship race began in the afternoon, with pole sitter Marc Hennerici leading the field to the green flag from a rolling start. Entering the first left-hander Miguel Ramos in the No.2 Vitaphone Maserati attempted to secure second place but lost the rear of the car under braking and tapped the rear end of Hennerici's Corvette as the car spun across the course. While attempting to regain control, the rear of the Maserati was hit by the No.7 Aston Martin of Tomáš Enge, who ricocheted into the No.12 Mad-Croc Corvette of Pertti Kuismanen. All three cars would retire from the race due to the accident damage. Further into the first lap, the No.9 Hexis Aston Martin spun on his own, leaving driver Philippe Dumas at the tail of the field. These incidents forced the stewards to deploy the safety car as Hennerici lead the field ahead of the No.11 Mad-Croc Corvette of Alex Müller, the No.1 Vitaphone Maserati of Andrea Bertolini, the No.24 Reiter Lamborghini of Christopher Haase, and the No.5 Matech Ford of Romain Grosjean, who gained nine positions on the opening lap.

After two laps under the safety car, the race was restarted and Hennerici continued as the race leader. Grosjean began to climb his way through the field, passing Kox's Lamborghini on Lap 5, then Piccini's Maserati two laps later, then was able to take second place from Müller's Corvette before the end of Lap 8. The pit window opened on Lap 10, with Hennerici forfeiting the lead to Grosjean to take the first opportunity to pit and change to driver Andreas Zuber. Three laps later both the Matech Ford and Mad-Croc Corvette came in for their pit stops, but the Corvette had a slower pit stop and fell to seventh place. After the ten-minute pit window closed, Thomas Mutsch took over the second-place Matech Ford while Michael Bartels held third in the Vitaphone Maserati. Neither driver was able to catch the leading Corvette of Zuber, while Xavier Maassen in the No.11 Mad-Croc Corvette was able to climb back to fourth position before the car's engine failed three laps from the finish. Zuber eventually took the race win by just over two seconds ahead of Mutsch after having led by as much as ten seconds earlier in the race. Bartels completed the podium and final points earning position for the qualifying race.

==== Race result ====
| Pos | No. | Team | Drivers | Manufacturer | Laps | Time/Retired |
|---|---|---|---|---|---|---|
| 1 | 13 | (Germany) Phoenix Racing / Carsport | (Germany) Marc Hennerici (Austria) Andreas Zuber | Corvette | 26 | |
| 2 | 5 | (Switzerland) Matech Competition | (Germany) Thomas Mutsch (Switzerland) Romain Grosjean | Ford | 26 | −2.273 |
| 3 | 1 | (Germany) Vitaphone Racing Team | (Germany) Michael Bartels (Italy) Andrea Bertolini | Maserati | 26 | −4.308 |
| 4 | 8 | (Germany) Young Driver AMR | (Germany) Stefan Mücke (Denmark) Christoffer Nygaard | Aston Martin | 26 | −37.808 |
| 5 | 33 | (Germany) Triple H Team Hegersport | (Germany) Altfrid Heger (Greece) Alexandros Margaritis | Maserati | 26 | −43.535 |
| 6 | 40 | (Belgium) Marc VDS Racing Team | (Belgium) Bas Leinders (Belgium) Maxime Martin | Ford | 26 | −45.608 |
| 7 | 9 | (France) Hexis AMR | (France) Philippe Dumas (France) Frédéric Makowiecki | Aston Martin | 26 | −54.118 |
| 8 | 10 | (France) Hexis AMR | (Monaco) Clivio Piccione (Switzerland) Jonathan Hirschi | Aston Martin | 26 | −1:07.115 |
| 9 | 3 | (Switzerland) Swiss Racing Team | (Austria) Karl Wendlinger (Switzerland) Henri Moser | Nissan | 26 | −1:12.583 |
| 10 | 25 | (Germany) Reiter | (Brazil) Ricardo Zonta (Brazil) Rafael Daniel | Lamborghini | 26 | −1:13.649 |
| 11 | 23 | (United Kingdom) Sumo Power GT | (United Kingdom) Peter Dumbreck (Germany) Michael Krumm | Nissan | 26 | −1:15.161 |
| 12 | 4 | (Switzerland) Swiss Racing Team | (Sweden) Max Nilsson (Japan) Seiji Ara | Nissan | 26 | −1:19.330 |
| 13 | 22 | (United Kingdom) Sumo Power GT | (United Kingdom) Warren Hughes (United Kingdom) Jamie Campbell-Walter | Nissan | 26 | −1:27.725 |
| 14 DNF | 11 | (Belgium) Mad-Croc Racing | (Netherlands) Xavier Maassen (Germany) Alex Müller | Corvette | 23 | Engine |
| 15 DNF | 24 | (Germany) Reiter | (Netherlands) Peter Kox (Germany) Christopher Haase | Lamborghini | 20 | Brakes |
| 16 | 14 | (Germany) Phoenix Racing / Carsport | (Netherlands) Mike Hezemans (Italy) Andrea Piccini | Corvette | 20 | −6 Laps |
| 17 DNF | 38 | (Germany) All-Inkl.com Münnich Motorsport | (Netherlands) Nicky Pastorelli (Germany) Dominik Schwager | Lamborghini | 17 | Retired |
| 18 DNF | 37 | (Germany) All-Inkl.com Münnich Motorsport | (Germany) Marc Basseng (Germany) Thomas Jäger | Lamborghini | 12 | Retired |
| 19 DNF | 41 | (Belgium) Marc VDS Racing Team | (Belgium) Renaud Kuppens (Finland) Markus Palttala | Ford | 2 | Clutch |
| 20 DNF | 2 | (Germany) Vitaphone Racing Team | (Portugal) Miguel Ramos (Brazil) Enrique Bernoldi | Maserati | 1 | Collision |
| 21 DNF | 7 | (Germany) Young Driver AMR | (Czech Republic) Tomáš Enge (United Kingdom) Darren Turner | Aston Martin | 1 | Collision |
| 22 DNF | 12 | (Belgium) Mad-Croc Racing | (Finland) Pertti Kuismanen (Finland) Mika Salo | Corvette | 0 | Collision |
| DNS | 34 | (Germany) Triple H Team Hegersport | (Belgium) Bert Longin (Italy) Matteo Bobbi | Maserati | 0 | Did Not Start |
| DNS | 6 | (Switzerland) Matech Competition | (Switzerland) Natacha Gachnang (Switzerland) Cyndie Allemann | Ford | 0 | Did Not Start |

=== Championship race ===
==== Race result ====
| Pos | No. | Team | Drivers | Manufacturer | Laps | Time/Retired |
|---|---|---|---|---|---|---|
| 1 | 5 | (Switzerland) Matech Competition | (Germany) Thomas Mutsch (Switzerland) Romain Grosjean | Ford | 28 | |
| 2 | 13 | (Germany) Phoenix Racing / Carsport | (Germany) Marc Hennerici (Austria) Andreas Zuber | Corvette | 28 | −23.061 |
| 3 | 14 | (Germany) Phoenix Racing / Carsport | (Netherlands) Mike Hezemans (Italy) Andrea Piccini | Corvette | 28 | −26.485 |
| 4 | 1 | (Germany) Vitaphone Racing Team | (Germany) Michael Bartels (Italy) Andrea Bertolini | Maserati | 28 | −34.075 |
| 5 | 25 | (Germany) Reiter | (Brazil) Ricardo Zonta (Brazil) Rafael Daniel | Lamborghini | 28 | −49.496 |
| 6 | 2 | (Germany) Vitaphone Racing Team | (Portugal) Miguel Ramos (Brazil) Enrique Bernoldi | Maserati | 28 | −53.059 |
| 7 | 34 | (Germany) Triple H Team Hegersport | (Belgium) Bert Longin (Italy) Matteo Bobbi | Maserati | 28 | −1:00.565 |
| 8 | 24 | (Germany) Reiter | (Netherlands) Peter Kox (Germany) Christopher Haase | Lamborghini | 28 | −1:12.694 |
| 9 | 33 | (Germany) Triple H Team Hegersport | (Germany) Altfrid Heger (Greece) Alexandros Margaritis | Maserati | 28 | −1:24.473 |
| 10 | 11 | (Belgium) Mad-Croc Racing | (Netherlands) Xavier Maassen (Germany) Alex Müller | Corvette | 28 | −1:26.254 |
| 11 | 7 | (Germany) Young Driver AMR | (Czech Republic) Tomáš Enge (United Kingdom) Darren Turner | Aston Martin | 28 | −1:26.848 |
| 12 | 22 | (United Kingdom) Sumo Power GT | (United Kingdom) Warren Hughes (United Kingdom) Jamie Campbell-Walter | Nissan | 28 | −1:28.174 |
| 13 | 40 | (Belgium) Marc VDS Racing Team | (Belgium) Bas Leinders (Belgium) Maxime Martin | Ford | 28 | −1:37.634 |
| 14 | 3 | (Switzerland) Swiss Racing Team | (Austria) Karl Wendlinger (Switzerland) Henri Moser | Nissan | 28 | −1:59.534 |
| 15 | 12 | (Belgium) Mad-Croc Racing | (Finland) Pertti Kuismanen (Finland) Mika Salo | Corvette | 28 | −2:01.150 |
| 16 | 23 | (United Kingdom) Sumo Power GT | (United Kingdom) Peter Dumbreck (Germany) Michael Krumm | Nissan | 27 | −1 Lap |
| 17 | 37 | (Germany) All-Inkl.com Münnich Motorsport | (Germany) Marc Basseng (Germany) Thomas Jäger | Lamborghini | 24 | −4 Laps |
| 18 DNF | 10 | (France) Hexis AMR | (Monaco) Clivio Piccione (Switzerland) Jonathan Hirschi | Aston Martin | 22 | Puncture |
| 19 DNF | 9 | (France) Hexis AMR | (France) Philippe Dumas (France) Frédéric Makowiecki | Aston Martin | 15 | Retired |
| 20 DNF | 38 | (Germany) All-Inkl.com Münnich Motorsport | (Netherlands) Nicky Pastorelli (Germany) Dominik Schwager | Lamborghini | 12 | Retired |
| 21 DNF | 4 | (Switzerland) Swiss Racing Team | (Sweden) Max Nilsson (Japan) Seiji Ara | Nissan | 1 | Collision |
| 22 DNF | 8 | (Germany) Young Driver AMR | (Germany) Stefan Mücke (Denmark) Christoffer Nygaard | Aston Martin | 0 | Collision |
| DNS | 41 | (Belgium) Marc VDS Racing Team | (Belgium) Renaud Kuppens (Finland) Markus Palttala | Ford | 0 | Did Not Start |
| DNS | 6 | (Switzerland) Matech Competition | (Switzerland) Natacha Gachnang (Switzerland) Cyndie Allemann | Ford | 0 | Did Not Start |

FIA GT1 World Championship
| Previous race: None | 2010 season | Next race: RAC Tourist Trophy |
