= Vitaphone Racing =

German car racing team

(Germany) Vitaphone Racing (Germany) Vita4One Racing
- Founded: 2004
- Founder(s): Michael Bartels
- Folded: 2016
- Base: (office) Olpe, Germany (technical) Oschersleben, Germany (formerly) Herborn, Germany
- Former series: FIA GT Championship; FIA GT1 Championship; Blancpain Endurance Series; ADAC GT Masters; British GT Championship; VLN Langstreckenmeisterschaft Nürburgring
- Noted drivers: (Germany) Michael Bartels (Italy) Andrea Bertolini (Italy) Thomas Biagi (Finland) Mika Salo
- Teams' Championships: 2005 FIA GT Championship; 2006 FIA GT Championship; 2007 FIA GT Championship; 2008 FIA GT Championship; 2009 FIA GT Championship; 2010 FIA GT1 World Championship
- Drivers' Championships: 2006 FIA GT Championship; 2007 FIA GT Championship; 2008 FIA GT Championship; 2009 FIA GT Championship; 2010 FIA GT1 World Championship

Vitaphone Racing, or Vita4One, was a German racing team who participated in the FIA GT Championship. The team was actually Bartels Motor & Sport GmbH, but operated under the title of its main sponsor, Vitaphone GmbH. They have successfully raced the Maserati MC12 GT1 since 2005, becoming one of the most successful GT teams in the series with five FIA GT1 Teams' Championship and four FIA GT1 Drivers' Championship. Their chief drivers were Michael Bartels and Andrea Bertolini.

== Racing history ==
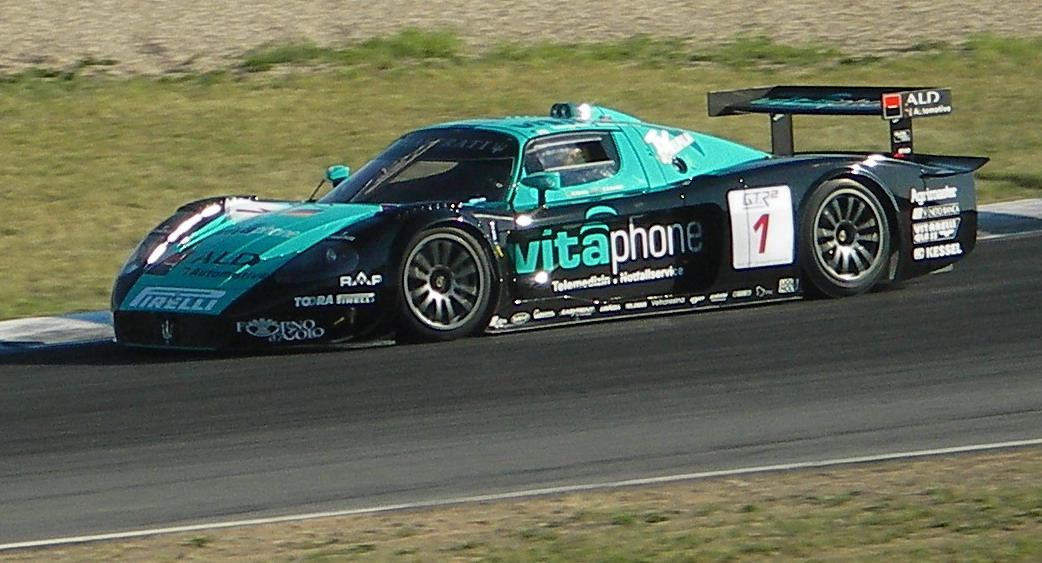
Michael Bartels racing a Maserati MC12 GT1 in the 2006 FIA GT

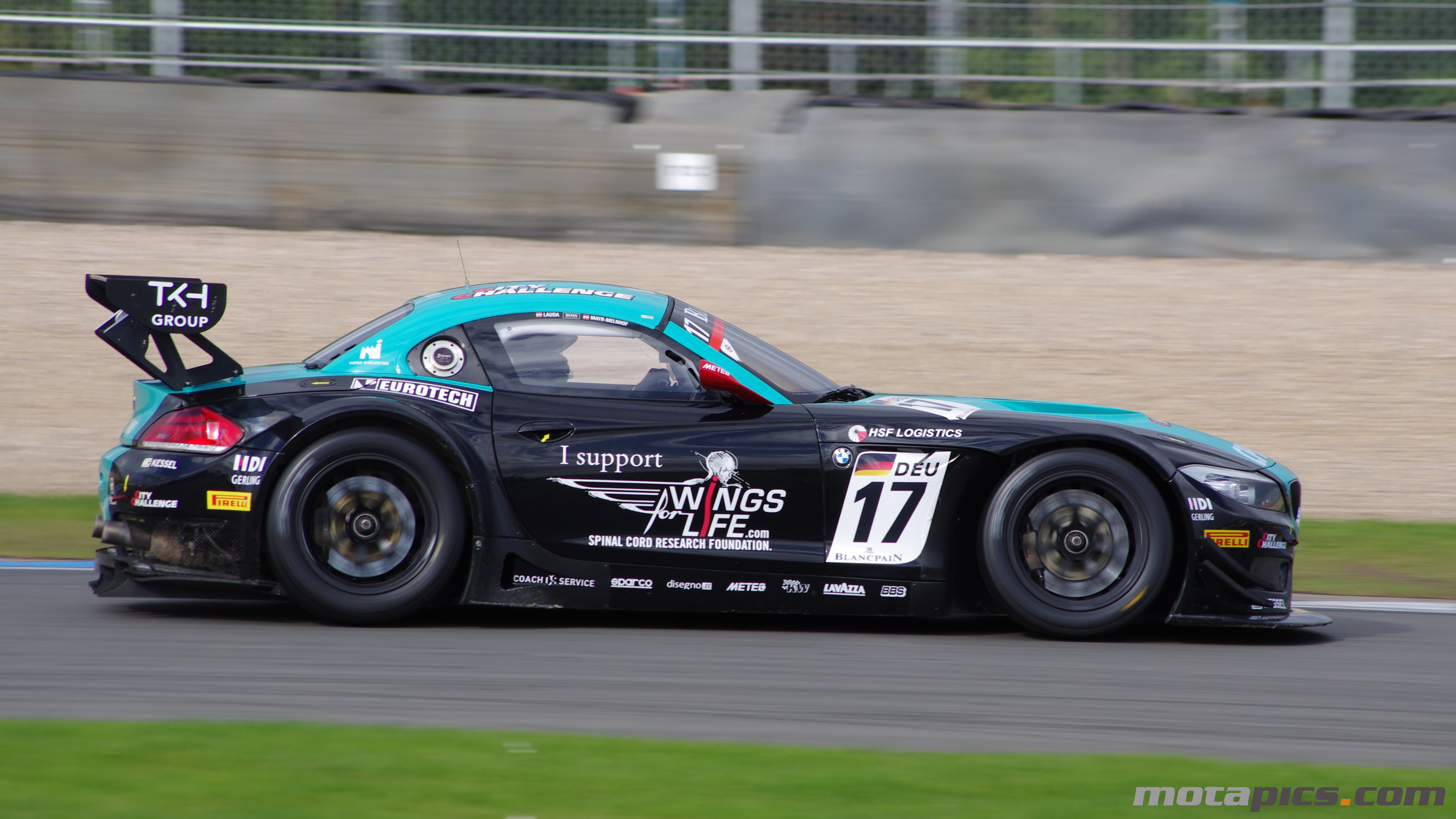
Mathias Lauda racing a BMW Z4 GT3 in the 2012 FIA GT

The Vitaphone Racing team has enjoyed success in the FIA GT, GT1 class championship. In 2004, they initially campaigned a Saleen S7-R, coming in fourth in the teams championship. Although racing under their own entrant name, the car was in actually run by Konrad Motorsport.

In 2005, they switched to the Maserati MC12 and won the FIA GT teams championship ahead of JMB Racing (also racing a Maserati MC12) allowing Maserati to win the FIA GT Manufacturers Title. In 2006 Vitaphone Racing again won the FIA GT Teams Title, and their drivers Andrea Bertolini and Michael Bartels tied each other for the Drivers' Title.

In 2007, they once again won both the Driver and Teams Championships, this time with Thomas Biagi the sole Drivers Champion, because the regular co-driver that year, Michael Bartels, missed races at Silverstone and Bucharest, with Mika Salo and Fabrizio Gollin taking his place at each of those rounds respectively. Also, Bartels did not receive the points for finishing 6th at Zhuhai, as he did not complete the required 35 minutes of time in the car.

2008 would be another successful year for the team, with Bartels and Bertolini repeating their success of 2006, and also winning the Spa 24 Hours alongside fellow Vitaphone drivers Miguel Ramos and Alexandre Negrão. Vitaphone also claimed the Teams' Championship for the fourth consecutive year.

They also entered an Aston Martin DBR9 at the 24 Hours of Le Mans in 2008, as the Maserati MC12 was not eligible as a GT1 car under ACO's technical regulations.

In 2009, they won their fifth consecutive Teams' Championship, with Bartels and Bertolini being Drivers' Champions for the third time.

They have continued their GT programme in 2010, entering two updated Maserati MC12 to contest the FIA GT1 World Championship. They became the inaugural GT1 World Champions at the 2010 FIA GT1 San Luis round winning both the Drivers and Teams Championships with Bartels and Bertolini taking the Drivers Championship.

For the 2011 season, Vitaphone withdrew from the GT1 World Championship and competed in the Blancpain Endurance Series with 2 Ferrari 458, one of which was driven by the team's owner Michael Bartels and Andrea Bertolini.

In 2012, the team (as Vita4One) entered the FIA GT1 World Championship one last time in a BMW Z4. In the following years, he competed in championships such as ADAC GT Masters, Blancpain GT Series, and British GT, without notable success. His last appearance was in 2014.

== Racing record ==
=== 24 Hours of Le Mans results ===
Year	Entrant	No.	Car	Drivers	Class	Laps	Pos.	Class Pos.
2008	(Germany) Vitaphone Racing Team (United Kingdom) Strakka Racing	53	Aston Martin DBR9	(United Kingdom) Peter Hardman (United Kingdom) Nick Leventis (Brazil) Alexandre Negrão	GT1	82	DNF	DNF

=== Complete FIA GT Championship results ===
Year	Entrant	No.	Car	Engine	Tyres	Drivers	Class	R1	R2	R3	R4	R5	R6	R7	R8	R9	R10	R11	DC	TC
2004	(Germany) Vitaphone Racing Team	5	Saleen S7-R	Saleen 7.0L V8	P	(Germany) Michael Bartels (Germany) Uwe Alzen; Spa 24h endurance driver: (Austria) Franz Konrad	GT	MON; 1st	VAL; 13th	MAG; 3rd	HOC; 1st	BRN; 13th	DON; DNF	SPA; DNF	IMO; 2nd	OSC; 1st	DUB; 16th	—	7th	4th
2004	(Germany) Vitaphone Racing Team	6	Saleen S7-R	Saleen 7.0L V8	P	(Austria) Franz Konrad (Austria) Walter Lechner Jr. Spa 24h endurance drivers: (Switzerland) Toni Seiler / (Austria) Gerold Pankl	GT	—	VAL; 15th	MAG; DNF	HOC; DNF	BRN; DNF	DON; 15th	SPA; DNF	IMO; DNF	OSC; DNF	DUB; 19th	—	19th 21st	4th
2005	(Germany) Vitaphone Racing Team	9	Maserati MC12 GT1	Maserati 6.0L V12	P	(Germany) Michael Bartels (Germany) Timo Scheider; Spa 24h endurance driver: (Belgium) Eric van de Poele	GT1	MON; 2nd	MAG; 2nd	SIL; 2nd	IMO; DNF	BRN; 5th	SPA; 1st	OSC; 4th	IST; 1st	ZHU; DNF	DUB; 2nd	BAH; 2nd	2nd	1st
2005	(Germany) Vitaphone Racing Team	10	Maserati MC12 GT1	Maserati 6.0L V12	P	(Italy) Fabio Babini (Italy) Thomas Biagi; Spa 24h endurance drivers: (United Kingdom) Jamie Davies / (Belgium) Stéphane Lémeret	GT1	MON; 4th	MAG; 4th	SIL; 1st	IMO; 2nd	BRN; DNF	SPA; DNF	OSC; DNF	IST; 2nd	ZHU; 4th	DUB; 1st	BAH; 1st	4th	1st
2006	(Germany) Vitaphone Racing Team	1	Maserati MC12 GT1	Maserati 6.0L V12	P	(Germany) Michael Bartels (Italy) Andrea Bertolini; Spa 24h endurance drivers: (Belgium) Eric van de Poele / (Italy) Andrea Montermini	GT1	SIL; 1st	BRN; 4th	OSC; 1st	SPA; 1st	RIC; 8th	DIJ; 5th	MUG; 2nd	BUD; 2nd	ADR; 1st	DUB; 5th	—	1st	1st
2006	(Germany) Vitaphone Racing Team	2	Maserati MC12 GT1	Maserati 6.0L V12	P	(Portugal) Miguel Ramos (Belgium) Stéphane Lémeret; Spa 24h endurance drivers: (Belgium) Vincent Vosse / (Germany) Dirk Müller	GT1	SIL; 4th	BRN; 7th	OSC; DNF	SPA; DNF	RIC; 5th	DIJ; 3rd	MUG; 4th	BUD; 3rd	ADR; DNF	—	—	12th	1st
2007	(Germany) Vitaphone Racing Team	1	Maserati MC12 GT1	Maserati 6.0L V12	MI	(Italy) Thomas Biagi	GT1	ZHU; 6th	SIL; 2nd	BUC; 1st	MON; 2nd	OSC; 1st	SPA; 2nd	ADR; 2nd	BRN; 7th	NOG; DNF	ZOL; 3rd	—	1st	1st
2007	(Germany) Vitaphone Racing Team	1	Maserati MC12 GT1	Maserati 6.0L V12	MI	(Germany) Michael Bartels (Rd 1–3, 5–10)	GT1	ZHU; 6th	SIL; 2nd	BUC; 1st	MON; 2nd	OSC; 1st	SPA; 2nd	ADR; 2nd	BRN; 7th	NOG; DNF	ZOL; 3rd	—	6th	1st
2007	(Germany) Vitaphone Racing Team	1	Maserati MC12 GT1	Maserati 6.0L V12	MI	(Italy) Fabrizio Gollin (Rd 4, 6); Spa 24h endurance driver	GT1	ZHU; 6th	SIL; 2nd	BUC; 1st	MON; 2nd	OSC; 1st	SPA; 2nd	ADR; 2nd	BRN; 7th	NOG; DNF	ZOL; 3rd	—	4th	1st
2007	(Germany) Vitaphone Racing Team	1	Maserati MC12 GT1	Maserati 6.0L V12	MI	(Belgium) Eric van de Poele (Rd 6); Spa 24h endurance driver	GT1	ZHU; 6th	SIL; 2nd	BUC; 1st	MON; 2nd	OSC; 1st	SPA; 2nd	ADR; 2nd	BRN; 7th	NOG; DNF	ZOL; 3rd	—	NC	1st
2007	(Germany) Vitaphone Racing Team	2	Maserati MC12 GT1	Maserati 6.0L V12	MI	(Portugal) Miguel Ramos (San Marino) Christian Montanari; Spa 24h endurance drivers: (Italy) Alessandro Pier Guidi / (Finland) Mika Salo	GT1	ZHU; DNF	SIL; 6th	BUC; 6th	MON; 4th	OSC; DNF	SPA; DNF	ADR; 5th	BRN; 5th	NOG; 3rd	ZOL; DNF	—	4th	1st
2008	(Germany) Vitaphone Racing Team	1	Maserati MC12 GT1	Maserati 6.0L V12	MI	(Germany) Michael Bartels (Italy) Andrea Bertolini; Spa 24h endurance drivers: (Belgium) Eric van de Poele / (France) Stéphane Sarrazin	GT1	SIL; 3rd	MON; 2nd	ADR; 1st	OSC; 5th	SPA; 1st	BUC; 4th	BRN; 2nd	NOG; 3rd	ZOL; 1st	SLU; 2nd	—	1st	1st
2008	(Germany) Vitaphone Racing Team	2	Maserati MC12 GT1	Maserati 6.0L V12	MI	(Portugal) Miguel Ramos (Brazil) Alexandre Negrão; Spa 24h endurance drivers: (Italy) Alessandro Pier Guidi / (Belgium) Stéphane Lémeret	GT1	SIL; 5th	MON; 4th	ADR; 3rd	OSC; DNF	SPA; DNF	BUC; DNF	BRN; 3rd	NOG; 1st	ZOL; 4th	SLU; DNF	—	4th	1st
2008	(Germany) Team Vitasystems	17	Maserati MC12 GT1	Maserati 6.0L V12	MI	(Italy) Matteo Bobbi (Portugal) Pedro Lamy	GT1	—	—	—	—	—	—	—	—	ZOL; 8th	—	—	25th	11th
2009	(Germany) Vitaphone Racing Team	1	Maserati MC12 GT1	Maserati 6.0L V12	MI	(Germany) Michael Bartels (Italy) Andrea Bertolini; Spa 24h endurance drivers: (France) Stéphane Sarrazin / (Brazil) Alexandre Negrão	GT1	SIL; 2nd	ADR; 2nd	OSC; 1st	SPA; 2nd	HUN; 4th	ALG; 4th	RIC; 3rd	ZOL; 5th	—	—	—	1st	1st
2009	(Germany) Vitaphone Racing Team	2	Maserati MC12 GT1	Maserati 6.0L V12	MI	(Portugal) Miguel Ramos (Germany) Alex Müller; Spa 24h endurance drivers: (Belgium) Eric van de Poele / (Portugal) Pedro Lamy	GT1	SIL; DNF	ADR; 3rd	OSC; 4th	SPA; DNF	HUN; 1st	ALG; DNF	RIC; DNF	—	—	—	—	6th	1st
2009	(Germany) Vitaphone Racing Team	33	Maserati MC12 GT1	Maserati 6.0L V12	MI	(Italy) Alessandro Pier Guidi (Belgium) Stéphane Lémeret; Spa 24h endurance drivers: (Sweden) Carl Rosenblad / (Belgium) Vincent Vosse	GT1	—	—	—	SPA; 2nd	—	—	—	—	—	—	—	8th	1st

== Complete FIA GT1 World Championship results ==
Year	Entrant	No.	Car	Engine	Tyres	Drivers	R1		R2		R3		R4		R5		R6		R7		R8		R9		R10		DC	TC
Year	Entrant	No.	Car	Engine	Tyres	Drivers	QR	CR	QR	CR	QR	CR	QR	CR	QR	CR	QR	CR	QR	CR	QR	CR	QR	CR	QR	CR	DC	TC
2010	(Germany) Vitaphone Racing Team	1	Maserati MC12 GT1	Maserati 6.0L V12	MI	(Germany) Michael Bartels (Italy) Andrea Bertolini	ABU; 3	ABU; 4	SIL; 3	SIL; 7	BRN; 1	BRN; 5	PRT; 1	PRT; 1	SPA; Ret	SPA; 7	NÜR; 10	NÜR; 6	ALG; 2	ALG; 1	NAV; 7	NAV; 6	INT; 8	INT; 9	SAN; 12	SAN; 7	1st	1st
2010	(Germany) Vitaphone Racing Team	2	Maserati MC12 GT1	Maserati 6.0L V12	MI	(Brazil) Enrique Bernoldi	ABU; Ret	ABU; 6	SIL; 9	SIL; 15	BRN; 7	BRN; 6	PRT; 5	PRT; Ret	SPA; 11	SPA; 4	NÜR; 7	NÜR; 12	ALG; 13	ALG; Ret	NAV; Ret	NAV; 12	INT; 4	INT; 1	SAN; 16	SAN; 14	15th	1st
2010	(Germany) Vitaphone Racing Team	2	Maserati MC12 GT1	Maserati 6.0L V12	MI	(Portugal) Miguel Ramos	ABU; Ret	ABU; 6	SIL; 9	SIL; 15	BRN; 7	BRN; 6	PRT; 5	PRT; Ret	SPA; 11	SPA; 4	NÜR; 7	NÜR; 12	ALG; 13	ALG; Ret	NAV; Ret	NAV; 12			SAN; 16	SAN; 14	21st	1st
2010	(Germany) Vitaphone Racing Team	2	Maserati MC12 GT1	Maserati 6.0L V12	MI	(Brazil) Alexandre Negrão (Rd. 9 only)																	INT; 4	INT; 1			24th	1st
2011: Vitaphone Racing Team did not participate
2012	(Germany) Vita4One Racing Team	17	BMW Z4 GT3	BMW 4.4L V8	P	(Austria) Mathias Lauda (Austria) Nikolaus Mayr-Melnhof	NOG; 12	NOG; 11	ZOL; 5	ZOL; 14	NAV; 7	NAV; 5	SVK; 10	SVK; 7	ALG; 5	ALG; 8	SVK; 2	SVK; 3	MOS; 7	MOS; 10	NÜR; 9	NÜR; 5	DON; 8	DON; Ret	—		12th	
2012	(Germany) Vita4One Racing Team	18	BMW Z4 GT3	BMW 4.4L V8	P	(Germany) Michael Bartels (Netherlands) Yelmer Buurman	NOG; 11	NOG; 10	ZOL; 1	ZOL; 2	NAV; 3	NAV; 4	SVK; 3	SVK; 1	ALG; 2	ALG; 5	SVK; 1	SVK; 1	MOS; 10	MOS; 7	NÜR; 4	NÜR; 4	DON; 9	DON; 9	—		3rd	4th
