= Sumo Power =

British car tuning company based

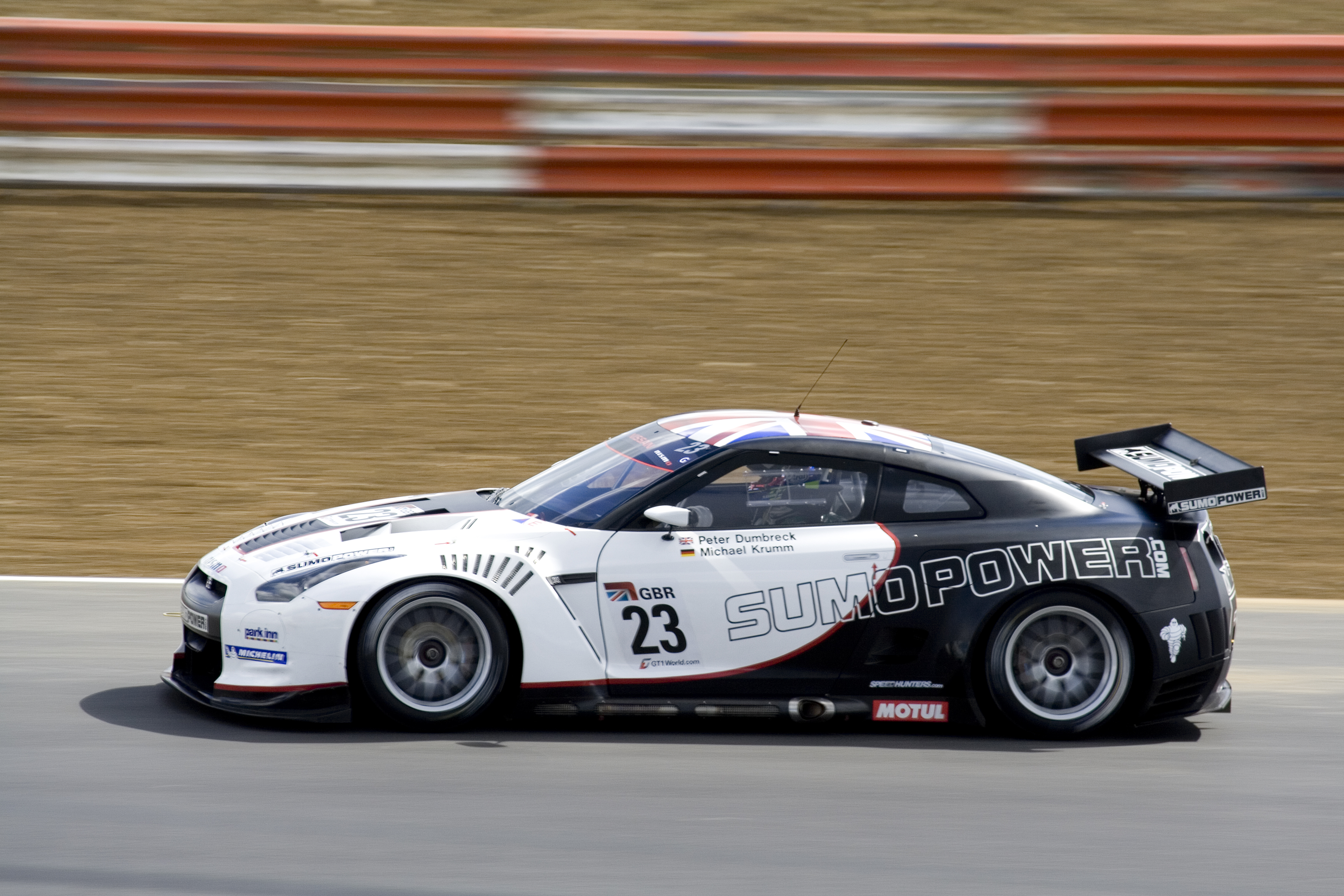
A Nissan GT-R entered by Sumo Power GT in the FIA GT1 World Championship

Sumo Power is a British car tuning company based in Rye, East Sussex, England. Founded in 2002, Sumo Power specializes in custom tuning Japanese imports, including the Nissan Skyline GT-R and Mitsubishi Lancer Evolution, as well as the importation and sale of many Japanese performance parts, including being an official British distributor for HKS Europe Ltd.

Sumo Power regularly competes in drag racing and drifting events with their tuned cars, and has recently expanded their efforts into rallying and sports car racing. In 2009 Sumo Power merged with JR Motorsports Group (JRM), an experienced motorsport development company which already served as the official team for Mitsubishi Motors UK in the British Rally Championship. Sumo Power and JRM now serve as the official importer of the Mitsubishi Lancer Evolution X to Britain.

In 2010, Sumo Power and JRM partnered with Nismo to serve as one of two teams representing Nissan in the inaugural FIA GT1 World Championship. The team, entered under the Sumo Power GT title, campaigned two Nissan GT-Rs, with a line-up including British drivers Jamie Campbell-Walter, Peter Dumbreck, and Warren Hughes, as well as Nismo factory driver Michael Krumm. Sumo Power returned for 2011 with four Nissans, with JR Motorsports representing the second squad. JR Motorsports won the Driver's Championship with Michael Krumm and Lucas Luhr, but failed to win the Team's Championship.

For 2012, the team competed in the FIA World Endurance Championship in LMP1 with an HPD ARX-03a.

As of April 2014, Sumo Power is under new ownership and based in Littleport.

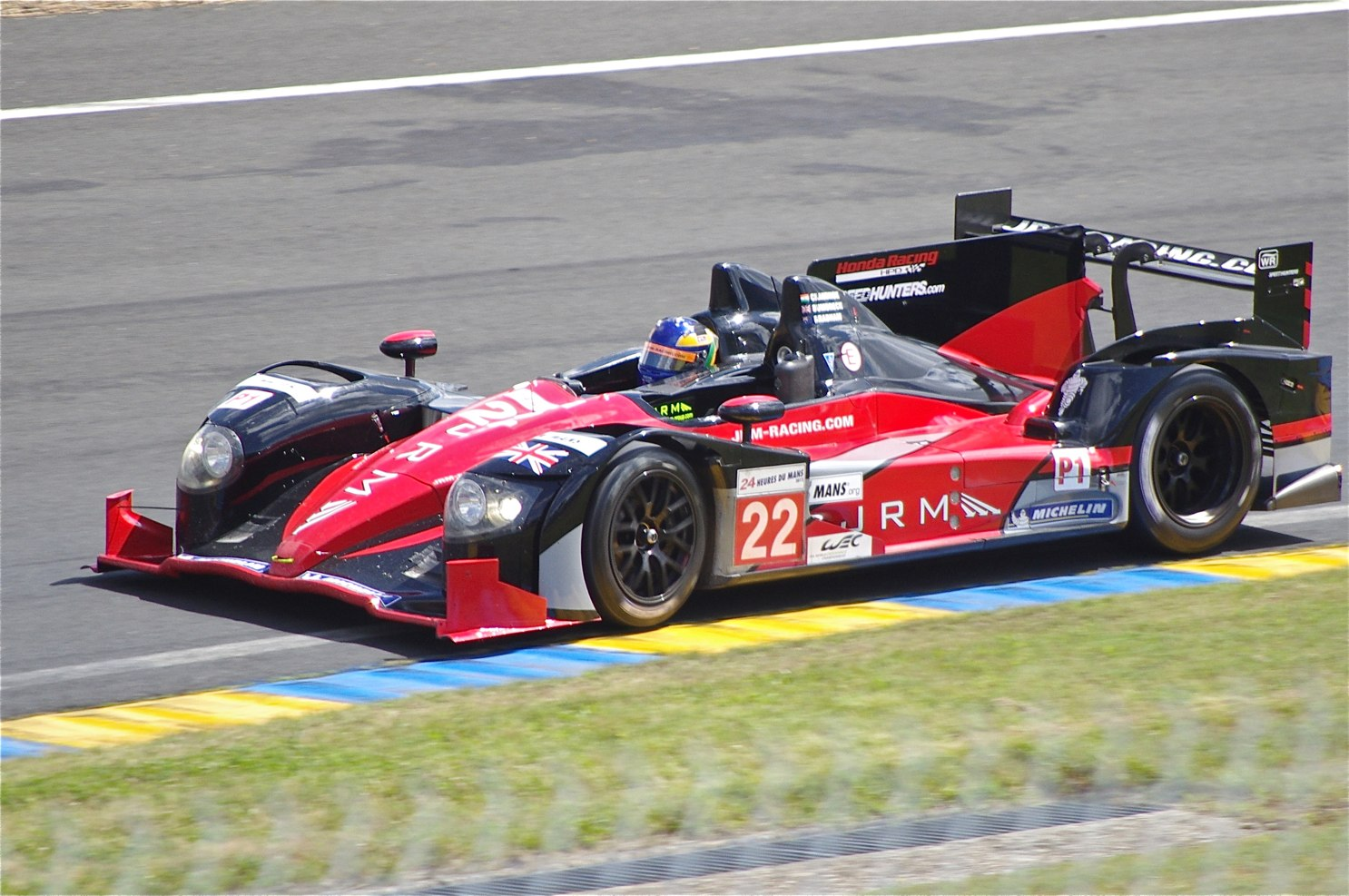
JRM's HPD LMP1 at the 2012 24 Hours of Le Mans.

== 24 Hours of Le Mans results ==
Year	Entrant	No.	Car	Drivers	Class	Laps	Pos.	Class Pos.
2012	(United Kingdom) JRM	22	HPD ARX-03a-Honda	(Australia) David Brabham (India) Karun Chandhok (United Kingdom) Peter Dumbreck	LMP1	357	6th	6th

== See also ==
- Michael Krumm
- Nissan GT-R
