= 2025 24 Hours of Zolder =

Motorsports race

The 2025 24 Hours of Zolder was an endurance racing event held on 30–31 August 2025 at Circuit Zolder, a 4 km-long motorsport track in Belgium. It marked the 47th running of the race, which has been a staple of Belgian endurance racing since 1983.

The event formed part of the 2025 Belcar Endurance Championship, attracting a diverse grid of GT and touring cars competing across multiple classes. Alongside the main race, the Belcar Skylimit Sprint Cup served as the official support series, providing additional on-track action throughout the weekend.

== Entry list ==
No.	Entrant	Car	Driver 1	Driver 2	Driver 3	Driver 4	Driver 5
GT Cup (11)
2	(Belgium) ART Racing	Porsche 992 GT3 Cup	(Belgium) Christoff Corten	(Netherlands) Nick Ho	(Netherlands) Sacha Norden	(Belgium) Benjamin Paque	(Netherlands) Bas Schouten
11	(Antigua and Barbuda) HAAS RT	Audi R8 LMS GT2	(Belgium) Nicolas Guelinckx	(Belgium) Peter Guelinckx	(Belgium) Stienes Longin	(Belgium) Matisse Lismont	
15	(Belgium) D’Ieteren Luxury Performance by NGT	Porsche 992 GT3 Cup	(Belgium) Bertrand Baguette	(Sweden) Robin Knutsson	(Belgium) Glenn Van Parijs	(Belgium) Laurens Vanthoor	(Belgium) Cédric Wauters
23	(Belgium) MM Racing	Porsche 992 GT3 Cup	(Belgium) Mick Meurrens	(Belgium) Steve Meurrens	(Belgium) Tom Meurrens		
59	(Belgium) Q1-Trackracing	Porsche 992 GT3 Cup	(Belgium) Sam Dejonghe	(France) Florian Latorre	(Belgium) David Saelens	(Belgium) Nicolas Saelens	(Belgium) Lars Zaenen
68	(Belgium) JDK by NGT	Porsche 992 GT3 Cup	(Belgium) Frédéric Bouvy	(Belgium) Benjamin De Cock	(Belgium) Juna-Jane De Keersmaecker	(Belgium) Alessandro Tudisca	(Belgium) Gilles Verleyen
92	(Belgium) VR Racing by NGT	Porsche 992 GT3 Cup	(United Kingdom) Jonny Edgar	(France) Kévin Estre	(Germany) Lars Kern	(Belgium) Dirk Van Rompuy	(Belgium) Tom Van Rompuy
93	(Belgium) RedAnt Racing	Porsche 992 GT3 Cup	(Belgium) Kobe De Breucker	(Germany) Kenneth Heyer	(Luxembourg) Dylan Pereira	(Belgium) Ayrton Redant	(Belgium) Yannick Redant
98	Belgium Racing	Porsche 992 GT3 Cup	(Belgium) Olivier Bertels	(Belgium) Michael Cool	(Netherlands) Oscar Gräper	(Belgium) Brent Verheyen	
99	Belgium Racing	Porsche 992 GT3 Cup	(Belgium) Dylan Derdaele	(Belgium) Jan Lauryssen	(Netherlands) Xavier Maassen	(Belgium) Nico Verdonck	
911	(Belgium) Q1-Trackracing	Porsche 992 GT3 Cup	(Portugal) Gonçalo Fernandes	(Belgium) Jan Ooms	(Belgium) Glenn Paenen	(Belgium) Arthur Peeters	(Belgium) Nicolas Vandierendonck
GT Sport (6)
7	(Belgium) Selleslagh Racing Team	Mercedes-AMG GT4	(Belgium) Jarne de Meulder	(Belgium) Alex de Schepper	(Belgium) Vic Stevens	(Belgium) Alec Verbergt	
19	(Belgium) Hamofa Motorsport	BMW M4 GT4 Evo (G82)	(United Kingdom) Nigel Greensall	(Belgium) Kris Verhoeven	(Belgium) Mark Verhoeven	(Belgium) Rob Verhoeven	
45	(Belgium) BMS Motorsport	BMW M4 GT4 (G82)	(Belgium) Filip Baelus	(Belgium) Yana Loeman	(Belgium) Eveline Maes	(Belgium) Dirk Mertens	(Belgium) Chris Van Woensel
69	(Belgium) Verkoyen Motorsport	BMW M6	(Belgium) Bart Stouten	(Belgium) Raf Van Belle	(Belgium) Geoffrey Verkoyen		
77	(Belgium) BE Motorsport by PG	Porsche 718 Cayman GT4 Clubsport	(Belgium) Bart Custers	(Belgium) Didier Beyens	(Belgium) Stephan Beyens	(Belgium) Hans Van Den Ouden	
246	(Belgium) LVRT	BMW M4 GT4 (F82)	(Belgium) Ruud Boffin	(Netherlands) Maik Broersen	(Belgium) Pablo Coosemans	(Belgium) Danny Luyten	(Belgium) Dominique Vanhees
Super Sport (10)
6	(Belgium) HBR Motorsport Powered by AR Performance	BMW E90 WTCC	(Belgium) René De Coninck	(Netherlands) Cor Euser	(United Kingdom) Charlie Martin	(Netherlands) Robert Van den Berg	(Netherlands) Sandra Van der Sloot
12	(Belgium) Racing Projects – Team Heiveld	BMW M240i Dayvtec	(Belgium) Kobe Claes	(Belgium) Bart Meynendonckx	(Belgium) Peter Meynendonckx	(Belgium) Robin Meynendonckx	(Belgium) Joris Van Aspers
14	(Belgium) Alnimax Racing	BMW M235i Racing	(Belgium) Alexander Borgmans	(Belgium) Maxim De Witte	(Belgium) Gary Terclavers	(Belgium) Kenny Terclavers	
39	(Belgium) R&J Racing	BMW E46 M3	(Belgium) Dries Bongaerts	(Belgium) Johan De Kerpel	(Belgium) Wouter De Vos	(Belgium) Ronald Thienpont	(Belgium) Jef Van Mechelen
40	(Belgium) Convents Racing Team	BMW 2 Series	(Belgium) Celine Convents	(Belgium) Davy Convents	(Belgium) Vincent Convents	(Belgium) Steve Raymakers	
55	(Belgium) Genius Water Racing	Lamera GT	(Belgium) Geert De Cnijf	(Belgium) Peter Houben	(Belgium) Bram Mouton	(Belgium) Dimitri Van Der Spek	
88	(Belgium) IC Motorsport by Tuinhuizen Cockaerts	BMW M240i Dayvtec	(Belgium) Cédric Baeten	(Belgium) Wouter Bollen	(Belgium) Ian Gepts	(Belgium) Gilles Molemans	(Belgium) Frank Wilsens
100	(Belgium) JuSi Racing	BMW M1	(Belgium) David Drieghe	(Belgium) Luc Janssens	(Belgium) Wouter Muylle	(Belgium) Jurgen Vermeulen	
101	(Belgium) Rova-JuSi Racing	BMW M1	(Belgium) Nic De Wilde	(Belgium) Erwin Deldime	(Belgium) Sigrid Maes	(Belgium) Roland Van Asch	
747	(Belgium) Stevens Motorsport	BMW M2	(Belgium) Jochen Stevens	(Belgium) Xavier Stevens	(Belgium) Nick Van Pelt		
Club Sport (3)
1	(Belgium) Atrex Motorsports	BMW E36 328i	(Belgium) Evertjan Alders	(Netherlands) Sidney Dieleman	(Belgium) Ben Thaens	(Belgium) Bert Theunissen	
4	(Belgium) FOUR RACING by Roos Motorsport	Toyota Yaris GR	(Belgium) Luc Branckaerts	(Belgium) Didier Dexters	(Belgium) Patrick Dubois		
57	(Belgium) IR Pwrd by GRT Motorsport	BMW G20 CS	(Belgium) Gerben De Meulder	(Belgium) Daan Dirkx	(Belgium) Benjamin Moechars	(Belgium) Gilles Puelings	(Belgium) Ive Van Der Aa
Club Challenge (6)
29	(Belgium) Fastlane Motorsports	Honda Civic	(Belgium) Tim Cloosen	(Belgium) Philippe Lowette	(Belgium) Johnnie Smeets	(Belgium) Kwinten Swennen	(Belgium) Tom Vandendael
33	(Belgium) MSTC	Mazda MX-5	(Belgium) Alain De Jong	(Belgium) Robbe Janssens	(Belgium) Ellen Leysen	(Belgium) Bert Van Gansen	(Belgium) Tom Vanderheyden
34	(Netherlands) BMW Team Van Der Horst	BMW 325i E90	(Belgium) Ben Poelmans	(Belgium) Peter S'Jongers	(Belgium) Maxim Vermeulen	(Belgium) Peter De Waegemaeker	
36	(Netherlands) BMW Team Van Der Horst	BMW 325i E90	(Netherlands) Bryan Finders	(Belgium) Johan Lambregs	(Belgium) Dieter Stevens	(Belgium) Tom Werckx	
371	(Belgium) ML Autosport	BMW E46 by ML	(Belgium) Edwin Beyers	(Belgium) Nicolas Koninckx	(Belgium) Mauro Polderman	(Belgium) "Rocco"	(Belgium) Peter Sterken
505	(Belgium) ML Autosport	BMW E36 by ML	(Belgium) Bram Hendrix	(Belgium) Jorg Hendrix	(Belgium) Rajko Pagen	(Belgium) Dennis Schroyen	(Belgium) Michiel Smulders
Total Entry's (36)

== Qualifying Results ==
=== Super Pole ===
Pole positions in each class are denoted in bold.

Pos.	Class	No.	Team	Driver	Car	Time	Gap
1	**GTC**	**93**	**(Belgium) RedAnt Racing**	**(Luxembourg) Dylan Pereira**	**Porsche 992 GT3 Cup**	**1:29.717**	-
2	GTC	15	(Belgium) D’Ieteren Luxury Performance by NGT	(Belgium) Glenn Van Parijs	Porsche 992 GT3 Cup	1:29.987	+0.270
3	GTC	11	(Antigua and Barbuda) HAAS RT	(Belgium) Stienes Longin	Audi R8 LMS GT2	1:30.508	+0.791
4	GTC	59	(Belgium) Q1-Trackracing	(France) Florian Latorre	Porsche 992 GT3 Cup	1:30.670	+0.953
5	GTC	2	(Belgium) ART Racing	(Belgium) Benjamin Paque	Porsche 992 GT3 Cup	1:30.737	+1.020
6	GTC	99	Belgium Racing	(Netherlands) Xavier Maassen	Porsche 992 GT3 Cup	1:30.986	+1.269
7	GTC	911	(Belgium) Q1-Trackracing	(Belgium) Jan Ooms	Porsche 992 GT3 Cup	1:31.821	+2.104
8	GTC	98	Belgium Racing	(Belgium) Michael Cool	Porsche 992 GT3 Cup	1:32.132	+2.415
9	GTC	23	(Belgium) MM Racing	(Belgium) Steve Meurrens	Porsche 992 GT3 Cup	1:33.264	+3.547
10	GTC	68	(Belgium) JDK by NGT	(Belgium) Benjamin De Cock	Porsche 992 GT3 Cup	1:33.337	+3.620
11	GTC	92	(Belgium) VR Racing by NGT	(Belgium) Tom Van Rompuy	Porsche 992 GT3 Cup	1:33.410	+3.693
12	**GTS**	**7**	**(Belgium) Selleslagh Racing Team**	**(Belgium) Vic Stevens**	**Mercedes-AMG GT4**	**1:35.597**	**+5.880**
13	GTS	19	(Belgium) Hamofa Motorsport	(United Kingdom) Nigel Greensall	BMW M4 GT4 Evo (G82)	1:36.548	+6.831
14	GTS	45	(Belgium) BMS Motorsport	(Belgium) Chris Van Woensel	BMW M4 GT4 (G82)	1:37.134	+7.417
15	**SS**	**6**	**(Belgium) HBR Motorsport Powered by AR Performance**	**(Netherlands) Robert Van den Berg**	**BMW E90 WTCC**	**1:37.868**	**+8.151**
16	SS	747	(Belgium) Stevens Motorsport	(Belgium) Nick Van Pelt	BMW M2	1:38.243	+8.526
17	SS	88	(Belgium) IC Motorsport by Tuinhuizen Cockaerts	(Belgium) Cédric Baeten	BMW M240i Dayvtec	1:40.410	+10.693
18	SS	12	(Belgium) Racing Projects – Team Heiveld	(Belgium) Kobe Claes	BMW M240i Dayvtec	1:40.873	+11.156
19	GTS	77	(Belgium) BE Motorsport by PG	(Belgium) Didier Beyens	Porsche 718 Cayman GT4 Clubsport	1:43.439	+13.722
20	SS	40	(Belgium) Convents Racing Team	(Belgium) Vincent Convents	BMW 2 Series	1:43.522	+13.805
21	SS	100	(Belgium) JuSi Racing	(Belgium) Jurgen Vermeulen	BMW M1	1:45.312	+15.595
22	**CS**	**4**	**(Belgium) FOUR RACING by Roos Motorsport**	**(Belgium) Didier Dexters**	**Toyota Yaris GR**	**1:46.063**	**+16.346**
23	SS	14	(Belgium) Alnimax Racing	(Belgium) Alexander Borgmans	BMW M235i Racing	1:48.738	+19.021
24	CS	1	(Belgium) Atrex Motorsports	(Belgium) Ben Thaens	BMW E36 328i	1:48.792	+19.075
25	CS	57	(Belgium) IR Pwrd by GRT Motorsport	(Belgium) Benjamin Moechars	BMW G20 CS	1:49.176	+19.459
26	GTS	246	(Belgium) LVRT	(Belgium) Danny Luyten	BMW M4 GT4 (F82)	1:49.310	+19.593
27	**CC**	**34**	**(Netherlands) BMW Team Van Der Horst**	**(Belgium) Peter De Waegemaeker**	**BMW 325i E90**	**1:52.477**	**+22.760**
28	CC	505	(Belgium) ML Autosport	(Belgium) Jorg Hendrix	BMW E36 by ML	1:52.778	+23.061
29	CC	36	(Netherlands) BMW Team Van Der Horst	(Belgium) Johan Lambregs	BMW 325i E90	1:52.918	+23.201
30	CC	33	(Belgium) MSTC	(Belgium) Tom Vanderheyden	Mazda MX-5	1:53.638	+23.921
31	SS	101	(Belgium) Rova-JuSi Racing	(Belgium) Roland Van Asch	BMW M1	1:54.315	+24.598
32	CC	29	(Belgium) Fastlane Motorsports	(Belgium) Philippe Lowette	Honda Civic	1:56.120	+26.403
33	SS	39	(Belgium) R&J Racing	(Belgium) Wouter De Vos	BMW E46 M3	1:59.436	+29.719
DNS	GTS	69	(Belgium) Verkoyen Motorsport		BMW M6		
DNS	SS	55	(Belgium) Genius Water Racing		Lamera GT		
DNS	CC	371	(Belgium) ML Autosport		BMW E46 by ML		

== Race results ==
Class winners denoted in bold and with ‡

Pos	Class	No.	Team	Drivers	Car	Laps	Time
1	GTC	**93**	**(Belgium) RedAnt Racing**	**(Belgium) Kobe De Breucker (Germany) Kenneth Heyer (Luxembourg) Dylan Pereira (Belgium) Ayrton Redant (Belgium) Yannick Redant**	**Porsche 992 GT3 Cup**	**823**	**24:01:24.381‡**
2	GTC	15	(Belgium) D’Ieteren Luxury Performance by NGT	(Belgium) Bertrand Baguette (Sweden) Robin Knutsson (Belgium) Glenn Van Parijs (Belgium) Laurens Vanthoor (Belgium) Cédric Wauters	Porsche 992 GT3 Cup	818	+5 laps
3	GTC	59	(Belgium) Q1-Trackracing	(Belgium) Sam Dejonghe (France) Florian Latorre (Belgium) David Saelens (Belgium) Nicolas Saelens (Belgium) Lars Zaenen	Porsche 992 GT3 Cup	813	+10 laps
4	GTC	98	Belgium Racing	(Belgium) Olivier Bertels (Belgium) Michael Cool (Netherlands) Oscar Gräper (Belgium) Brent Verheyen	Porsche 992 GT3 Cup	811	+12 laps
5	GTC	92	(Belgium) VR Racing by NGT	(United Kingdom) Jonny Edgar (France) Kévin Estre (Germany) Lars Kern (Belgium) Dirk Van Rompuy (Belgium) Tom Van Rompuy	Porsche 992 GT3 Cup	810	+13 laps
6	GTC	2	(Belgium) ART Racing	(Belgium) Christoff Corten (Netherlands) Nick Ho (Netherlands) Sacha Norden (Belgium) Benjamin Paque (Netherlands) Bas Schouten	Porsche 992 GT3 Cup	787	+36 laps
7	GTC	68	(Belgium) JDK by NGT	(Belgium) Frédéric Bouvy (Belgium) Benjamin De Cock (Belgium) Juna-Jane De Keersmaecker (Belgium) Alessandro Tudisca (Belgium) Gilles Verleyen	Porsche 992 GT3 Cup	774	+49 laps
8	GTS	**7**	**(Belgium) Selleslagh Racing Team**	**(Belgium) Jarne de Meulder (Belgium) Alex de Schepper (Belgium) Vic Stevens (Belgium) Alec Verbergt**	**Mercedes-AMG GT4**	**771**	**+52 laps‡**
9	GTC	911	(Belgium) Q1-Trackracing	(Portugal) Gonçalo Fernandes (Belgium) Jan Ooms (Belgium) Glenn Paenen (Netherlands) Arthur Peeters (Belgium) Nicolas Vandierendonck	Porsche 992 GT3 Cup	749	+74 laps
10	GTS	19	(Belgium) Hamofa Motorsport	(United Kingdom) Nigel Greensall (Belgium) Kris Verhoeven (Belgium) Mark Verhoeven (Belgium) Rob Verhoeven	BMW M4 GT4 Evo (G82)	745	+78 laps
11	SS	**747**	**(Belgium) Stevens Motorsport**	**(Belgium) Jochen Stevens (Belgium) Xavier Stevens (Belgium) Nick Van Pelt**	**BMW M2**	**740**	**+83 laps‡**
12	SS	88	(Belgium) IC Motorsport by Tuinhuizen Cockaert	(Belgium) Cédric Baeten (Belgium) Wouter Bollen (Belgium) Ian Gepts (Belgium) Gilles Molemans (Belgium) Frank Wilsens	BMW M240i Dayvtec	735	+88 laps
13	GTC	11	(Antigua and Barbuda) HAAS RT	(Belgium) Nicolas Guelinckx (Belgium) Peter Guelinckx (Belgium) Stienes Longin (Belgium) Matisse Lismont	Audi R8 LMS GT2	711	+112 laps
14	GTS	45	(Belgium) BMS Motorsport	(Belgium) Filip Baelus (Belgium) Yana Loeman (Belgium) Eveline Maes (Belgium) Dirk Mertens (Belgium) Chris Van Woensel	BMW M4 GT4 (G82)	710	+113 laps
15	SS	12	(Belgium) Racing Projects – Team Heiveld	(Belgium) Kobe Claes (Belgium) Bart Meynendonckx (Belgium) Peter Meynendonckx (Belgium) Robin Meynendonckx (Belgium) Joris Van Aspers	BMW M240i Dayvtec	706	+117 laps
16	SS	14	(Belgium) Alnimax Racing	(Belgium) Alexander Borgmans (Belgium) Maxim De Witte (Belgium) Gary Terclavers (Belgium) Kenny Terclavers	BMW M235i Racing	705	+118 laps
17	SS	55	(Belgium) Genius Water Racing	(Belgium) Geert De Cnijf (Belgium) Peter Houben (Belgium) Bram Mouton (Belgium) Dimitri Van Der Spek	Lamera GT	693	+130 laps
18	SS	40	(Belgium) Convents Racing Team	(Belgium) Celine Convents (Belgium) Davy Convents (Belgium) Vincent Convents (Belgium) Steve Raymakers	BMW 2 Series	687	+136 laps
19	CS	**57**	**(Belgium) IR Pwrd by GRT Motorsport**	**(Belgium) Gerben De Meulder (Belgium) Daan Dirkx (Belgium) Benjamin Moechars (Belgium) Gilles Puelings (Belgium) Ive Van Der Aa**	**BMW G20 CS**	**669**	**+154 laps‡**
20	CC	**34**	**(Netherlands) BMW Team Van Der Horst**	**(Belgium) Ben Poelmans (Belgium) Peter S'Jongers (Belgium) Maxim Vermeulen (Belgium) Peter De Waegemaeker**	**BMW 325i E90**	**637**	**+186 laps‡**
21	CC	36	(Netherlands) BMW Team Van Der Horst	(Netherlands) Bryan Finders (Belgium) Johan Lambregs (Belgium) Dieter Stevens (Belgium) Tom Werckx	BMW 325i E90	632	+191 laps
22	CS	4	(Belgium) FOUR RACING by Roos Motorsport	(Belgium) Luc Branckaerts (Belgium) Didier Dexters (Belgium) Patrick Dubois	Toyota Yaris GR	624	+199 laps
23	SS	100	(Belgium) JuSi Racing	(Belgium) David Drieghe (Belgium) Luc Janssens (Belgium) Wouter Muylle (Belgium) Jurgen Vermeulen	BMW M1	587	+236 laps
24	CC	371	(Belgium) ML Autosport	(Belgium) Edwin Beyers (Belgium) Nicolas Koninckx (Belgium) Mauro Polderman (Belgium) "Rocco" (Belgium) Peter Sterken	BMW E46 by ML	581	+242 laps
25	SS	101	(Belgium) Rova-JuSi Racing	(Belgium) Nic De Wilde (Belgium) Erwin Deldime (Belgium) Sigrid Maes (Belgium) Roland Van Asch	BMW M1	570	+253 laps
26	CC	29	(Belgium) Fastlane Motorsports	(Belgium) Tim Cloosen (Belgium) Philippe Lowette (Belgium) Johnnie Smeets (Belgium) Kwinten Swennen (Belgium) Tom Vandendael	Honda Civic	505	+318 laps
27	CS	1	(Belgium) Atrex Motorsports	(Belgium) Evertjan Alders (Netherlands) Sidney Dieleman (Belgium) Ben Thaens (Belgium) Bert Theunissen	BMW E36 328i	430	+393 laps
28	GTC	99	Belgium Racing	(Belgium) Dylan Derdaele (Belgium) Jan Lauryssen (Netherlands) Xavier Maassen (Belgium) Nico Verdonck	Porsche 992 GT3 Cup	586	+237 laps (Did not finish)
29	CC	33	(Belgium) MSTC	(Belgium) Alain De Jong (Belgium) Robbe Janssens (Belgium) Ellen Leysen (Belgium) Bert Van Gansen (Belgium) Tom Vanderheyden	Mazda MX-5	480	+343 laps (Did not finish)
30	GTS	246	(Belgium) LVRT	(Belgium) Ruud Boffin (Netherlands) Maik Broersen (Belgium) Pablo Coosemans (Belgium) Danny Luyten (Belgium) Dominique Vanhees	BMW M4 GT4 (F82)	411	+412 laps (Did not finish)
NC	SS	39	(Belgium) R&J Racing	(Belgium) Dries Bongaerts (Belgium) Johan De Kerpel (Belgium) Wouter De Vos (Belgium) Ronald Thienpont (Belgium) Jef Van Mechelen	BMW E46 M3	298	Not classified
NC	CC	505	(Belgium) ML Autosport	(Belgium) Bram Hendrix (Belgium) Jorg Hendrix (Belgium) Rajko Pagen (Belgium) Dennis Schroyen (Belgium) Michiel Smulders	BMW E36 by ML	333	Not classified (Did not finish)
NC	GTC	23	(Belgium) MM Racing	(Belgium) Mick Meurrens (Belgium) Steve Meurrens (Belgium) Tom Meurrens	Porsche 992 GT3 Cup	241	Not classified (Did not finish)
NC	GTS	77	(Belgium) BE Motorsport by PG	(Belgium) Bart Custers (Belgium) Didier Beyens (Belgium) Stephen Beyens (Belgium) Hans Van Den Ouden	Porsche 718 Cayman GT4 Clubsport	144	Not classified (Did not finish)
NC	SS	6	(Belgium) HBR Motorsport Powered by AR Performance	(Belgium) René De Coninck (Netherlands) Cor Euser (United Kingdom) Charlie Martin (Netherlands) Robert Van den Berg (Netherlands) Sandra Van der Sloot	BMW E90 WTCC	90	Not classified (Did not finish)

Icon	Class
**GTC**	GT Cup
**GTS**	GT Sport
**SS**	Super Sport
**CS**	Club Sport
**CC**	Club Challenge
