= 2025 Belcar Endurance Championship =

The 2025 Belcar Endurance Championship was the 35th season of the Belcar Endurance Series, the national endurance racing championship in Belgium. Traditionally, the season started and finished with a race at Circuit Zolder and was highlighted by the 47th running of the 24 Hours of Zolder in August.

Entries to the championship were split into five classes: GT Cup, GT Sport, Super Sport, Club Sport and Club Challenge

== Calendar ==
Rnd	Race	Circuit	Location	Date
1	New Race Festival	Circuit Zolder	(Belgium) Heusden-Zolder	18 May
2	Spa Euro Race	Circuit de Spa-Francorchamps	(Belgium) Stavelot	1 June
3	25 Hours Fun Cup	Circuit de Spa-Francorchamps	(Belgium) Stavelot	5 July
4	24 Hours of Zolder	Circuit Zolder	(Belgium) Heusden-Zolder	30–31 August
5	American Festival Nascar Finals	Circuit Zolder	(Belgium) Heusden-Zolder	12 October

== Teams and drivers ==
Team	Car	No.	Drivers	Rounds
GT Cup
(Belgium) Russell Racing by Art Racing / Pitstream	Porsche 992 GT3 Cup	2	(Belgium) Christoff Corten	All
(Belgium) Russell Racing by Art Racing / Pitstream	Porsche 992 GT3 Cup	2	(Belgium) Frank Thiers	1
(Belgium) Russell Racing by Art Racing / Pitstream	Porsche 992 GT3 Cup	2	(Belgium) Hans Thiers	1
(Belgium) Russell Racing by Art Racing / Pitstream	Porsche 992 GT3 Cup	2	(United Kingdom) Jamie Morrow	2-3
(Belgium) Russell Racing by Art Racing / Pitstream	Porsche 992 GT3 Cup	2	(Netherlands) Nick Ho	4
(Belgium) Russell Racing by Art Racing / Pitstream	Porsche 992 GT3 Cup	2	(Belgium) Benjamin Paque	4-5
(Belgium) Russell Racing by Art Racing / Pitstream	Porsche 992 GT3 Cup	2	(Netherlands) Bas Schouten	4
(Belgium) WDP by NGT Racing	Porsche 992 GT3 Cup	5	(Belgium) Graham King	3
(Belgium) WDP by NGT Racing	Porsche 992 GT3 Cup	5	(Belgium) Konstantinos Zannos	3
(Antigua and Barbuda) HAAS RT	Audi R8 LMS GT2	11	(Belgium) Nicolas Guelinckx	1-2,4-5
(Antigua and Barbuda) HAAS RT	Audi R8 LMS GT2	11	(Belgium) Peter Guelinckx	1-2,4
(Antigua and Barbuda) HAAS RT	Audi R8 LMS GT2	11	(Belgium) Stienes Longin	2,4-5
(Antigua and Barbuda) HAAS RT	Audi R8 LMS GT2	11	(Belgium) Matisse Lismont	4
(Belgium) Q1-Trackracing	Porsche 992 GT3 Cup	11	(Belgium) Nicolas Saelens	3
(Belgium) Q1-Trackracing	Porsche 992 GT3 Cup	11	(Netherlands) Dirk Schouten	3
(Belgium) Alnimax Racing	Porsche 992 GT3 Cup	14	(Belgium) Alexander Borgmans	1
(Belgium) Alnimax Racing	Porsche 992 GT3 Cup	14	(Belgium) Maxim De Witte	1
(Belgium) D'Ieteren Luxury Performance by NGT	Porsche 992 GT3 Cup	15	(Belgium) Glenn Van Parijs	All
(Belgium) D'Ieteren Luxury Performance by NGT	Porsche 992 GT3 Cup	15	(Belgium) Cédric Wauters	All
(Belgium) D'Ieteren Luxury Performance by NGT	Porsche 992 GT3 Cup	15	(Sweden) Robin Knutsson	1, 4
(Belgium) D'Ieteren Luxury Performance by NGT	Porsche 992 GT3 Cup	15	(Belgium) Bertrand Baguette	4
(Belgium) D'Ieteren Luxury Performance by NGT	Porsche 992 GT3 Cup	15	(Belgium) Laurens Vanthoor	4
(Belgium) VR Racing by NGT	Porsche 992 GT3 Cup	92	(Belgium) Dirk Van Rompuy	1, 4
(Belgium) VR Racing by NGT	Porsche 992 GT3 Cup	92	(Belgium) Tom van Rompuy	1, 4
(Belgium) VR Racing by NGT	Porsche 992 GT3 Cup	92	(United Kingdom) Jonny Edgar	4
(Belgium) VR Racing by NGT	Porsche 992 GT3 Cup	92	(France) Kévin Estre	4
(Belgium) VR Racing by NGT	Porsche 992 GT3 Cup	92	(Germany) Lars Kern	4
(Belgium) MM Racing	Porsche 992 GT3 Cup	23	(Belgium) Mick Meurrens	All
(Belgium) MM Racing	Porsche 992 GT3 Cup	23	(Belgium) Steve Meurrens	All
(Belgium) MM Racing	Porsche 992 GT3 Cup	23	(Belgium) Tom Meurrens	All
(Belgium) Rush x Roos Collective	Porsche 992 GT3 Cup	28	(Belgium) Toon Hungenaert	1
(Belgium) Rush x Roos Collective	Porsche 992 GT3 Cup	28	(Belgium) Patrick Dubois	1
(Belgium) Rush x Roos Collective	Porsche 992 GT3 Cup	28	(Belgium) Wouter Manderveld	1
(Belgium) Q1-Trackracing	Porsche 992 GT3 Cup	59	(Belgium) Sam Dejonghe	4
(Belgium) Q1-Trackracing	Porsche 992 GT3 Cup	59	(France) Florian Latorre	4
(Belgium) Q1-Trackracing	Porsche 992 GT3 Cup	59	(Belgium) David Saelens	4
(Belgium) Q1-Trackracing	Porsche 992 GT3 Cup	59	(Belgium) Nicolas Saelens	4-5
(Belgium) Q1-Trackracing	Porsche 992 GT3 Cup	59	(Belgium) Lars Zaenen	4
(Belgium) Q1-Trackracing	Porsche 992 GT3 Cup	59	(Netherlands) Paul Meijer	5
(Belgium) Q1-Trackracing	Porsche 992 GT3 Cup	911	(Portugal) Gonçalo Fernandes	4
(Belgium) Q1-Trackracing	Porsche 992 GT3 Cup	911	(Belgium) Jan Ooms	4
(Belgium) Q1-Trackracing	Porsche 992 GT3 Cup	911	(Belgium) Glenn Paenen	4
(Belgium) Q1-Trackracing	Porsche 992 GT3 Cup	911	(Belgium) Arthur Peters	4
(Belgium) Q1-Trackracing	Porsche 992 GT3 Cup	911	(Belgium) Nicolas Vandierendonck	4
(Belgium) JDK by NGT	Porsche 992 GT3 Cup	68	(Belgium) Frédéric Bouvy	4
(Belgium) JDK by NGT	Porsche 992 GT3 Cup	68	(Belgium) Benjamin De Cock	4
(Belgium) JDK by NGT	Porsche 992 GT3 Cup	68	(Belgium) Juna-Jane De Keersmaeker	4
(Belgium) JDK by NGT	Porsche 992 GT3 Cup	68	(Belgium) Alessandro Tudisca	4
(Belgium) JDK by NGT	Porsche 992 GT3 Cup	68	(Belgium) Gilles Verleyen	4
(Belgium) RedAnt Racing	Porsche 992 GT3 Cup	93	(Belgium) Kobe De Breucker	4
(Belgium) RedAnt Racing	Porsche 992 GT3 Cup	93	(Germany) Kenneth Heyer	4
(Belgium) RedAnt Racing	Porsche 992 GT3 Cup	93	(Luxembourg) Dylan Pereira	4
(Belgium) RedAnt Racing	Porsche 992 GT3 Cup	93	(Belgium) Ayrton Redant	4
(Belgium) RedAnt Racing	Porsche 992 GT3 Cup	93	(Belgium) Yannick Redant	4
Belgium Racing	Porsche 992 GT3 Cup	98	(Belgium) Michael Cool	All
Belgium Racing	Porsche 992 GT3 Cup	98	(Belgium) Brent Verheyen	All
Belgium Racing	Porsche 992 GT3 Cup	98	(Belgium) Olivier Bertels	4
Belgium Racing	Porsche 992 GT3 Cup	98	(Netherlands) Oscar Gräper	4
Belgium Racing	Porsche 992 GT3 Cup	99	(Belgium) Dylan Derdaele	All
Belgium Racing	Porsche 992 GT3 Cup	99	(Belgium) Jan Lauryssen	All
Belgium Racing	Porsche 992 GT3 Cup	99	(Netherlands) Xavier Maassen	4
Belgium Racing	Porsche 992 GT3 Cup	99	(Belgium) Nico Verdonck	4
GT Sport
(Belgium) Selleslagh Racing Team	Mercedes AMG GT4	7	(Belgium) Marnik Battryn	1, 5
(Belgium) Selleslagh Racing Team	Mercedes AMG GT4	7	(Belgium) Quinn Van Hooydonck	1
(Belgium) Selleslagh Racing Team	Mercedes AMG GT4	7	(Belgium) Alex De Schepper	4
(Belgium) Selleslagh Racing Team	Mercedes AMG GT4	7	(Belgium) Vic Stevens	4
(Belgium) Selleslagh Racing Team	Mercedes AMG GT4	7	(Belgium) Alex Verbergt	4
(Belgium) Selleslagh Racing Team	Mercedes AMG GT4	7	(Belgium) Jarne De Meulder	4-5
(Belgium) Hamofa Motorsport	BMW M4 GT4 Evo	19	(United Kingdom) Nigel Greensall	4
(Belgium) Hamofa Motorsport	BMW M4 GT4 Evo	19	(Belgium) Kris Verhoeven	4
(Belgium) Hamofa Motorsport	BMW M4 GT4 Evo	19	(Belgium) Mark Verhoeven	4
(Belgium) Hamofa Motorsport	BMW M4 GT4 Evo	19	(Belgium) Rob Verhoeven	4
(Belgium) BMS Motorsport	BMW M4 GT4	45	(Belgium) Filip Baelus	1, 4-5
(Belgium) BMS Motorsport	BMW M4 GT4	45	(Belgium) Axel Roelants	1
(Belgium) BMS Motorsport	BMW M4 GT4	45	(Belgium) Eveline Maes	4
(Belgium) BMS Motorsport	BMW M4 GT4	45	(Belgium) Dirk Mertens	4
(Belgium) BMS Motorsport	BMW M4 GT4	45	(Belgium) Chris Van Woensel	4
(Belgium) BMS Motorsport	BMW M4 GT4	45	(Belgium) Yana Loeman	1, 5
(Belgium) JDK by NGT	Porsche 718 Cayman GT4 MR	68	(Belgium) Benjamin De Cock	1-3, 5
(Belgium) JDK by NGT	Porsche 718 Cayman GT4 MR	68	(Belgium) Juna-Jane De Keersmaecker	1-3, 5
(Belgium) Verkoyen Motorsport	BMW M6	69	(Belgium) Bart Stouten	4
(Belgium) Verkoyen Motorsport	BMW M6	69	(Belgium) Raf Van Belle	4
(Belgium) Verkoyen Motorsport	BMW M6	69	(Belgium) Geoffrey Verkoyen	4
(Belgium) BE Motorsport by PG	Porsche 718 Cayman GT4 Clubsport	77	(Belgium) Bart Custers	4
(Belgium) BE Motorsport by PG	Porsche 718 Cayman GT4 Clubsport	77	(Belgium) Didier Beyens	4
(Belgium) BE Motorsport by PG	Porsche 718 Cayman GT4 Clubsport	77	(Belgium) Stephan Beyens	4
(Belgium) BE Motorsport by PG	Porsche 718 Cayman GT4 Clubsport	77	(Belgium) Hans Van Den Ouden	4
(Germany) SR Motorsport by Schnitzelalm	Porsche Cayman GT4 CS	111	(Germany) Luisa Kahler	2
(Germany) SR Motorsport by Schnitzelalm	Porsche Cayman GT4 CS	111	(Germany) Wilhelm Kühne	2
(Belgium) LVRT	BMW M4 GT4	246	(Belgium) Ruud Boffin	4
(Belgium) LVRT	BMW M4 GT4	246	(Netherlands) Maik Broersen	4
(Belgium) LVRT	BMW M4 GT4	246	(Belgium) Pablo Coosemens	4
(Belgium) LVRT	BMW M4 GT4	246	(Belgium) Danny Luyten	4
(Belgium) LVRT	BMW M4 GT4	246	(Belgium) Dominique Vanhees	4
Super Sport
(Belgium) HBR Motorsport Powered by AR Performance	BMW E90 WTCC	6	(Belgium) René De Coninck	4
(Belgium) HBR Motorsport Powered by AR Performance	BMW E90 WTCC	6	(Netherlands) Cor Euser	4
(Belgium) HBR Motorsport Powered by AR Performance	BMW E90 WTCC	6	(United Kingdom) Charlie Martin	4
(Belgium) HBR Motorsport Powered by AR Performance	BMW E90 WTCC	6	(Netherlands) Robert Van den Berg	4
(Belgium) HBR Motorsport Powered by AR Performance	BMW E90 WTCC	6	(Netherlands) Sandra Van der Sloot	4
(Belgium) Racing Projects – Team Heiveld	BMW M240i	12	(Belgium) Bart Meynendonckx	All
(Belgium) Racing Projects – Team Heiveld	BMW M240i	12	(Belgium) Robin Meynendonckx	All
(Belgium) Racing Projects – Team Heiveld	BMW M240i	12	(Belgium) Peter Meynendonckx	1-4
(Belgium) Racing Projects – Team Heiveld	BMW M240i	12	(Belgium) Kobe Claes	4
(Belgium) Racing Projects – Team Heiveld	BMW M240i	12	(Belgium) Joris Van Apers	4-5
(Belgium) Alnimax Racing	BMW M235i Racing	14	(Belgium) Alexander Borgmans	4
(Belgium) Alnimax Racing	BMW M235i Racing	14	(Belgium) Alexander De Witte	4
(Belgium) Alnimax Racing	BMW M235i Racing	14	(Belgium) Gary Terclavers	4
(Belgium) Alnimax Racing	BMW M235i Racing	14	(Belgium) Kenny Terclavers	4
(Belgium) R&J Racing	BMW E46 M3	39	(Belgium) Dries Bongaerts	4
(Belgium) R&J Racing	BMW E46 M3	39	(Belgium) Johan De Kerpel	4
(Belgium) R&J Racing	BMW E46 M3	39	(Belgium) Wouter De Vos	4
(Belgium) R&J Racing	BMW E46 M3	39	(Belgium) Ronald Thienpont	4
(Belgium) R&J Racing	BMW E46 M3	39	(Belgium) Jef Van Mechelen	4
(Belgium) Convents Racing Team	BMW 2 Series	40	(Belgium) Celine Convents	4
(Belgium) Convents Racing Team	BMW 2 Series	40	(Belgium) Davy Convents	4
(Belgium) Convents Racing Team	BMW 2 Series	40	(Belgium) Vincent Convents	4
(Belgium) Convents Racing Team	BMW 2 Series	40	(Belgium) Steve Raymakers	4
(Belgium) IC Motorsport by Tuinhuizen Cockaerts	BMW M240i	88	(Belgium) Frank Wilsens	All
(Belgium) IC Motorsport by Tuinhuizen Cockaerts	BMW M240i	88	(Belgium) Yana Loeman	1
(Belgium) IC Motorsport by Tuinhuizen Cockaerts	BMW M240i	88	(Belgium) Cédric Baeten	1, 4
(Belgium) IC Motorsport by Tuinhuizen Cockaerts	BMW M240i	88	(Belgium) René De Coninck	2
(Belgium) IC Motorsport by Tuinhuizen Cockaerts	BMW M240i	88	(Belgium) Peter Van Delm	2
(Belgium) IC Motorsport by Tuinhuizen Cockaerts	BMW M240i	88	(Belgium) Ian Gepts	3-4
(Belgium) IC Motorsport by Tuinhuizen Cockaerts	BMW M240i	88	(Belgium) Wouter Bollen	4-5
(Belgium) JuSi Racing	BMW M1	100	(Belgium) David Drieghe	4
(Belgium) JuSi Racing	BMW M1	100	(Belgium) Luc Janssens	4
(Belgium) JuSi Racing	BMW M1	100	(Belgium) Wouter Muylle	4
(Belgium) JuSi Racing	BMW M1	100	(Belgium) Jurgen Vermeulen	4
(Belgium) Rova-JuSi Racing	BMW M1	101	(Belgium) Nic De Wilde	4
(Belgium) Rova-JuSi Racing	BMW M1	101	(Belgium) Erwin Deldime	4
(Belgium) Rova-JuSi Racing	BMW M1	101	(Belgium) Sigrid Maes	4
(Belgium) Rova-JuSi Racing	BMW M1	101	(Belgium) Roland Van Asch	4
(Belgium) Dayvtec	BMW M240i	601	(Belgium) Koen Wauters	1-2
(Belgium) VP-Racing	Audi RS3	747	(Belgium) Olivier Bertels	1-3, 5
(Belgium) VP-Racing	Audi RS3	747	(Belgium) Nick Van Pelt	1-3, 5
(Belgium) Stevens Motorsport	BMW M2	747	(Belgium) Jochen Stevens	4
(Belgium) Stevens Motorsport	BMW M2	747	(Belgium) Xavier Stevens	4
(Belgium) Stevens Motorsport	BMW M2	747	(Belgium) Nick Van Pelt	4
(Belgium) Autoglass Benelux	BMW M240i	679	(Belgium) Didier Dexters	5
(Belgium) Autoglass Benelux	BMW M240i	679	(Belgium) Patrick Dubois	5
(Belgium) Autoglass Benelux	BMW M240i	679	(Belgium) Bart Stouten	5
Club Sport
(Belgium) Atrex Motorsports	BMW E36 328i	1	(Belgium) Evertjan Alders	4
(Belgium) Atrex Motorsports	BMW E36 328i	1	(Netherlands) Sidney Dieleman	4
(Belgium) Atrex Motorsports	BMW E36 328i	1	(Belgium) Ben Thaens	4
(Belgium) Atrex Motorsports	BMW E36 328i	1	(Belgium) Bert Theunissen	4
(Belgium) FOUR RACING by Roos Motorsport	Toyota Yaris GR	4	(Belgium) Luc Branckaerts	4
(Belgium) FOUR RACING by Roos Motorsport	Toyota Yaris GR	4	(Belgium) Didier Dexters	4
(Belgium) FOUR RACING by Roos Motorsport	Toyota Yaris GR	4	(Belgium) Patrick Dubois	4
(Belgium) Ducktaped NCM	BMW 125i	32	(Belgium) Laurens Cloots	1-3
(Belgium) Ducktaped NCM	BMW 125i	32	(Belgium) Bart Custers	2
(Belgium) IR Pwrd by GRT Motorsport	BMW G20 CS	57	(Belgium) Gerben De Meulder	All
(Belgium) IR Pwrd by GRT Motorsport	BMW G20 CS	57	(Belgium) David Vyncke	1-3, 5
(Belgium) IR Pwrd by GRT Motorsport	BMW G20 CS	57	(Belgium) Ive Van Der Aa	1, 3-5
(Belgium) IR Pwrd by GRT Motorsport	BMW G20 CS	57	(Belgium) Geoffrey Verkoyen	2
(Belgium) IR Pwrd by GRT Motorsport	BMW G20 CS	57	(Belgium) Benjamin Moechars	3-4
(Belgium) IR Pwrd by GRT Motorsport	BMW G20 CS	57	(Belgium) Gilles Puelings	4
(Belgium) IR Pwrd by GRT Motorsport	BMW G20 CS	57	(Belgium) Daan Dirkx	4
(Belgium) Buga-Auto/Glow/MSTC	Alfa Romeo Giulia	509	(Belgium) Peter Bens	1, 3-5
(Belgium) Buga-Auto/Glow/MSTC	Alfa Romeo Giulia	509	(Belgium) Ellen Leysen	1, 3-5
(Belgium) Buga-Auto/Glow/MSTC	Alfa Romeo Giulia	509	(Belgium) Franky Boulat	5
Club Challenge
(Belgium) Fastlane Motorsports	Honda Civic	29	(Belgium) Tim Cloosen	4
(Belgium) Fastlane Motorsports	Honda Civic	29	(Belgium) Philippe Lowette	4
(Belgium) Fastlane Motorsports	Honda Civic	29	(Belgium) Johnnie Smeets	4
(Belgium) Fastlane Motorsports	Honda Civic	29	(Belgium) Kwinten Swennen	4
(Belgium) Fastlane Motorsports	Honda Civic	29	(Belgium) Tom Vandendael	4
(Belgium) MSTC	Mazda MX-5	33	(Belgium) Alain De Jong	All
(Belgium) MSTC	Mazda MX-5	33	(Belgium) Tom Vanderheyden	All
(Belgium) MSTC	Mazda MX-5	33	(Belgium) Robbe Janssens	4
(Belgium) MSTC	Mazda MX-5	33	(Belgium) Ellen Leysen	4
(Belgium) MSTC	Mazda MX-5	33	(Belgium) Bert Van Gansen	4
(Netherlands) BMW Team Van Der Horst	BMW 325i E90	34	(Belgium) Ben Poelmans	4
(Netherlands) BMW Team Van Der Horst	BMW 325i E90	34	(Belgium) Peter S'Jongers	4
(Netherlands) BMW Team Van Der Horst	BMW 325i E90	34	(Belgium) Maxim Vermeulen	4
(Netherlands) BMW Team Van Der Horst	BMW 325i E90	34	(Belgium) Peter De Waegemaeker	4
(Netherlands) BMW Team Van Der Horst	BMW 325i E90	36	(Netherlands) Bryan Finders	4
(Netherlands) BMW Team Van Der Horst	BMW 325i E90	36	(Belgium) Johan Lambregs	4
(Netherlands) BMW Team Van Der Horst	BMW 325i E90	36	(Belgium) Dieter Stevens	4
(Netherlands) BMW Team Van Der Horst	BMW 325i E90	36	(Belgium) Tom Werckx	4
(Belgium) ADC Racing	Honda Civic	347	(Belgium) Jonathan Compere	2
(Belgium) ADC Racing	Honda Civic	347	(Belgium) Laurent De Coninck	2
(Belgium) ADC Racing	Honda Civic	347	(Belgium) Yannick Van Espen	2
(Netherlands) ML Autosport	BMW E46 by ML	371	(Belgium) "ACE"	1
(Netherlands) ML Autosport	BMW E46 by ML	371	(Belgium) Didier Dexters	1-3
(Netherlands) ML Autosport	BMW E46 by ML	371	(Belgium) Peter Sterken	1, 3-4
(Netherlands) ML Autosport	BMW E46 by ML	371	(Belgium) Edwin Beyers	4
(Netherlands) ML Autosport	BMW E46 by ML	371	(Belgium) Dries Geladé	4
(Netherlands) ML Autosport	BMW E46 by ML	371	(Belgium) Nicolas Koninckx	4
(Netherlands) ML Autosport	BMW E46 by ML	371	(Belgium) Mauro Polderman	4
(Netherlands) ML Autosport	BMW E46 by ML	436	(Belgium) Rajko Pagen	2
(Netherlands) ML Autosport	BMW E46 by ML	436	(Belgium) Dennis Schroyen	2, 5
(Netherlands) ML Autosport	BMW E36 by ML	505	(Belgium) Jorg Hendrix	All
(Netherlands) ML Autosport	BMW E36 by ML	505	(Belgium) Dries Geladé	1-3
(Netherlands) ML Autosport	BMW E36 by ML	505	(Belgium) Rajko Pagen	4
(Netherlands) ML Autosport	BMW E36 by ML	505	(Belgium) Dennis Schroyen	4
(Netherlands) ML Autosport	BMW E36 by ML	505	(Belgium) Michiel Smulders	4
(Netherlands) ML Autosport	BMW E36 by ML	505	(Belgium) Bram Hendrix	4-5

== Results ==
Rnd	Race	Pole position	Overall winners
1	New Race Festival	(Belgium) No. 15 D'Ieteren Luxury Performance by NGT	(Belgium) No. 15 D'Ieteren Luxury Performance by NGT
1	New Race Festival	(Belgium) Glenn Van Parijs	(Sweden) Robin Knutsson (Belgium) Glenn Van Parijs
2	Spa Euro Race	(Belgium) No. 15 D'Ieteren Luxury Performance by NGT	No. 99 Belgium Racing
2	Spa Euro Race	(Belgium) Cédric Wauters	(Belgium) Dylan Derdaele (Belgium) Jan Lauryssen
3	25 Hours Fun Cup	(Belgium) No. 11 Q1-Trackracing	No. 99 Belgium Racing
3	25 Hours Fun Cup	(Netherlands) Dirk Schouten	(Belgium) Dylan Derdaele (Belgium) Jan Lauryssen
4	24 Hours of Zolder	(Belgium) No. 93 RedAnt Racing	(Belgium) No. 93 RedAnt Racing
4	24 Hours of Zolder	(Luxembourg) Dylan Pereira	(Belgium) Kobe De Breucker (Germany) Kenneth Heyer (Luxembourg) Dylan Pereira (Belgium) Ayrton Redant (Belgium) Yannick Redant
5	American Festival Nascar Finals	(Belgium) No. 59 Q1-Trackracing	(Belgium) No. 15 D'Ieteren Luxury Performance by NGT
5	American Festival Nascar Finals	(Netherlands) Paul Meijer	(Belgium) Glenn Van Parijs (Belgium) Cédric Wauters

== Standings ==
Points are awarded to the number of the entered car, following below points table. Every car that finishes the race in 10th position or lower receives 1 point. An extra point is awarded in each class for the car that gets pole position and one for the car setting the fastest race lap.

For the 24 hours of Zolder, extra points are awarded after 6 and 12 hours. These will be half of a full race points total. There will also be a half point awarded for fastest lap in class.

Points systems
Position	1st	2nd	3rd	4th	5th	6th	7th	8th	9th	10th-	Pole	FL
Overall	25	18	15	12	10	8	6	4	2	1	Pole	FL
Class	25	18	15	12	10	8	6	4	2	1	1	1

=== Overall classification ===
Pos.	Nr.	Team	Class	NRF		SER		25h FC		6/24h		12/24h		24/24h		NAS		Points
Pos.	Nr.	Team	Class	Ovr	Cls	Ovr	Cls	Ovr	Cls	Ovr	Cls	Ovr	Cls	Ovr	Cls	Ovr	Cls	Points
1	15	(Belgium) D'Ieteren Luxury Performance by NGT	GTC	1	1^{PF}	2	2^{PF}	2	2	1	1	1	1	1	1^{P}	1	1	277
2	747	(Belgium) VP Racing	SS	10	1^{PF}	6	1^{PF}	8	1^{PF}	9	1^{F}	8	1^{F}	7	1^{PF}	8	1^{PF}	187
3	99	Belgium Racing	GTC	2	2	1	1	1	1	12	8	7	6	14	7	3	3	182,5
4	57	(Belgium) IR Pwrd by GRT Motorsport	CS	17	2	13	1^{F}	11	1^{F}	14	1^{F}	13	1^{F}	12	1^{PF}	13	1^{PF}	156
5	98	Belgium Racing	GTC	3	3	15	6	4	4	4	4	3	3	2	2	5	5	146
6	2	(Belgium) Russell Racing by ART Racing/Pitstream	GTC	6	6	5	5	6	6	2	2	4	4	4	4	2	2	142
7	68	(Belgium) JDK by NGT Racing	GTC/GTS	12	2	7	1^{F}	9	1^{PF}	8	7	5	5	5	5	9	2	135
8	33	(Belgium) MSTC	CC	18	1	12	3	13	1^{F}	16	2	15	2	15	2	14	1	133
9	7	(Belgium) Selleslagh Racing Team	GTS	8	1^{PF}					7	1^{F}	6	1^{F}	6	1^{PF}	7	1^{PF}	132
10	11	(Antigua and Barbuda) HAAS RT	GTC	5	5	4	4			6	6	10	7^{F}	9	6^{F}	4	4^{PF}	125
10	11	(Belgium) Q1-Trackracing	GTC					3	3^{PF}									125
11	23	(Belgium) MM Racing	GTC	4	4	3	3	5	5	5	5	17	8	NC	NC	6	6	102,5
12	12	(Belgium) Racing Projects-Team Heiveld	SS	13	2	9	3	14	3	15	3	12	3	11	3	12	3	100,5
13	88	(Belgium) IC Motorsport by Tuinhuizen Cockaerts	SS	15	4	NC	NC	10	2	11	2	9	2	8	2	11	2	92
14	505	(Belgium) ML Autosport	CC	19	2^{F}	11	2	NC	NC^{P}	13	1	14	1	NC	NC^{P}	16	2^{PF}	88
15	92	(Belgium) VR Racing by NGT	GTC	7	7					3	3^{F}	2	2	3	3			75,5
16	45	(Belgium) BMS Motorsport	GTS	DNS	DNS					10	2	11	2	10	2	10	3	54
17	32	(Belgium) Ducktaped NCM	CS	16	1^{PF}	DNS	DNS^{P}	12	2^{P}									49
18	371	(Belgium) ML Autosport	CC	NC	NC^{P}			DNS	DNS	17	3^{F}	17	3^{F}	13	1^{F}			45
19	601	(Belgium) Dayvtec	SS	14	3	8	2											38
20	509	(Belgium) Buga-Auto/Glow/MSTC	CS	NC	NC	DNS	DNS	DNS	DNS							15	2	19
21	14	(Belgium) Alnimax Racing	GTC	9	8													6

Key
Colour	Result
Gold	Winner
Silver	Second place
Bronze	Third place
Green	Other points position
Blue	Other classified position
Blue	Not classified, finished (NC)
Purple	Not classified, retired (Ret)
Red	Did not qualify (DNQ)
Black	Disqualified (DSQ)
White	Did not start (DNS)
White	Race cancelled (C)
Blank	Did not practice (DNP)
Blank	Excluded (EX)
Blank	Did not arrive (DNA)
Blank	Withdrawn (WD)
Blank	Did not enter (empty cell)
Annotation	Meaning
P	Pole position in class
F	Fastest lap in class
