= 2021 STCC TCR Scandinavia Touring Car Championship =

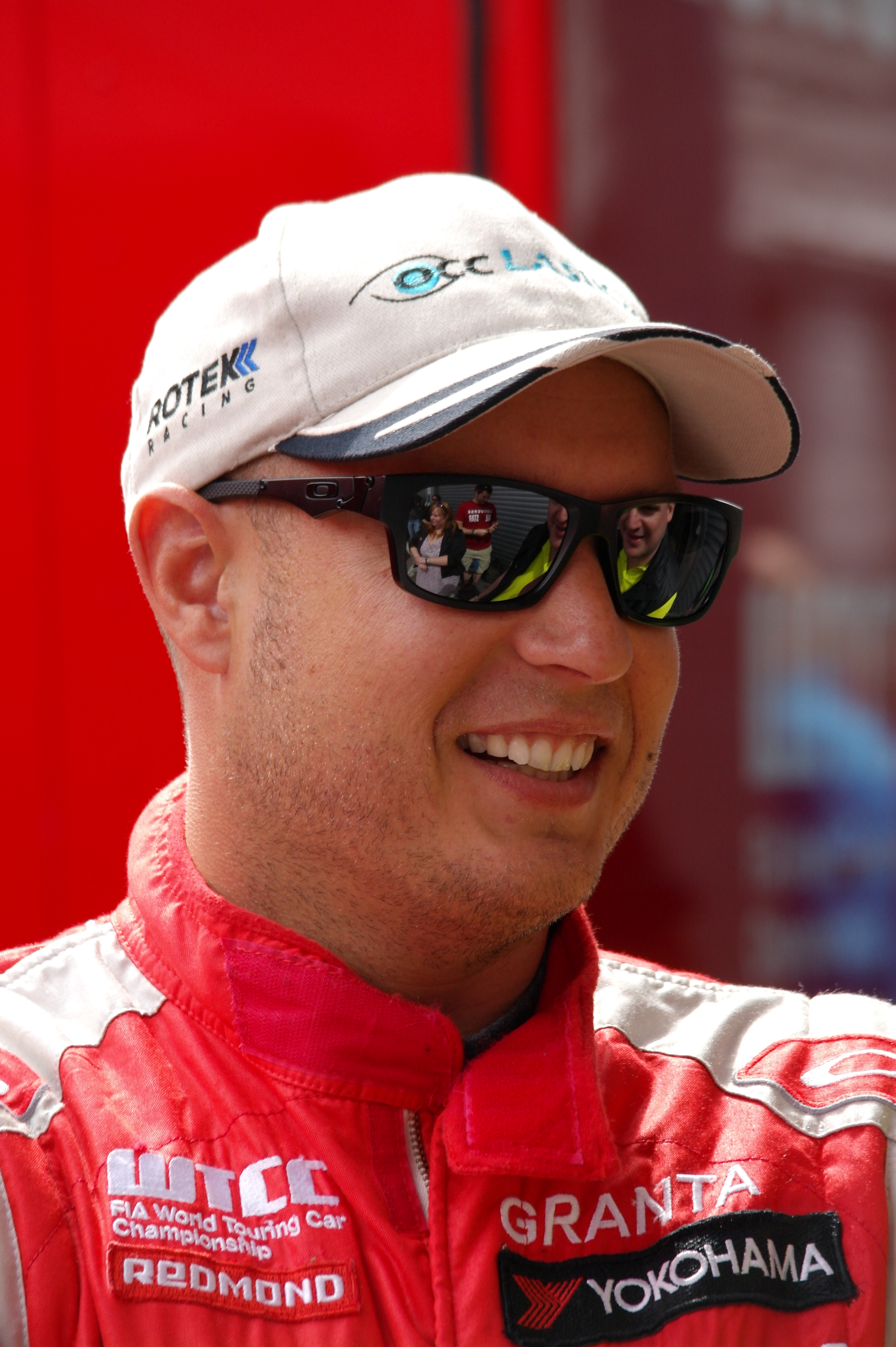
Robert Huff is the reigning Drivers' Champion.

The 2021 STCC TCR Scandinavia Touring Car Championship was the eleventh overall season of the Scandinavian Touring Car Championship and the fifth under the internationally recognised TCR formula. It is also the fourth time the championship is run under the STCC TCR Scandinavia Touring Car Championship banner. The season started on 4 June at Ljungbyheds Motorbana and ended on 9 October at Ring Knutstorp after six rounds.

== Teams and drivers ==
Entrant	Car	Race drivers		
Entrant	Car	No.	Driver name	Rounds
(Sweden) Cupra Dealer Team – PWR Racing	Cupra León Competición TCR	2	(Sweden) Robert Dahlgren	All
(Sweden) Cupra Dealer Team – PWR Racing	Cupra León Competición TCR	19	(Sweden) Mikaela Åhlin-Kottulinsky	All
(Sweden) Lestrup Racing Team by Volkswagen Stockholm (Note: Car No. 7 entered as Lestrup Racing Team by Volkswagen Stockholm and cars No. 32 and 48 entered as Lestrup Racing Team.) (Sweden) Lestrup Racing Team	Volkswagen Golf GTI TCR	7	(Sweden) Oliver Söderström	All
(Sweden) Lestrup Racing Team by Volkswagen Stockholm (Sweden) Lestrup Racing Team	Volkswagen Golf GTI TCR	32	(Sweden) Robin Knutsson	All
(Sweden) Lestrup Racing Team by Volkswagen Stockholm (Sweden) Lestrup Racing Team	Volkswagen Golf GTI TCR	48	(Sweden) Mikael Karlsson	All
(Sweden) Brink Motorsport	Audi RS3 LMS TCR	9	(Sweden) Kevin Engman	3
(Sweden) Brink Motorsport	Audi RS3 LMS TCR	26	(Sweden) Jessica Bäckman	4
(Sweden) Brink Motorsport	Audi RS3 LMS TCR	29	(Sweden) Andreas Bäckman	5
(Sweden) Brink Motorsport	Audi RS3 LMS TCR	51	(Sweden) Hannes Morin	1−2
(Sweden) Brink Motorsport	Audi RS3 LMS TCR	71	(Sweden) Tobias Brink	All
(Sweden) Brink Motorsport	Audi RS3 LMS TCR	91	(Norway) Magnus Gustavsen	6
(Sweden) MA:GP	Lynk & Co 03 TCR	20	(Sweden) Mattias Andersson	All
(Sweden) Kågered Racing	Volkswagen Golf GTI TCR	21	(Sweden) Andreas Ahlberg	All
(Sweden) Kågered Racing	Volkswagen Golf GTI TCR	69	(Sweden) Hugo Nerman	All
(Sweden) Experion Racing	Hyundai i30 N TCR	22	(Sweden) Albin Wärnelöv	All
(Sweden) FH Racing	Cupra León TCR	33	(Sweden) Rasmus Hedberg	All
(Sweden) Brovallen Design	Audi RS3 LMS TCR	70	(Sweden) Isac Aronsson	All

== Race calendar and results ==
Round		Circuit	Location	Date	Pole position	Fastest lap	Race winner	Winning team
1	R1	(Sweden) Ljungbyheds Motorbana	Ljungbyhed, Skåne	4–5 June	(Sweden) Robert Dahlgren	(Sweden) Hugo Nerman	(Sweden) Robert Dahlgren	(Sweden) Cupra Dealer Team – PWR Racing
1	R2	(Sweden) Ljungbyheds Motorbana	Ljungbyhed, Skåne	4–5 June	(Sweden) Robert Dahlgren	(Sweden) Robert Dahlgren	(Sweden) Robert Dahlgren	(Sweden) Cupra Dealer Team – PWR Racing
1	R3	(Sweden) Ljungbyheds Motorbana	Ljungbyhed, Skåne	4–5 June		(Sweden) Hugo Nerman	(Sweden) Mattias Andersson	(Sweden) MA:GP
2	R1	(Sweden) Drivecenter Arena	Skellefteå, Västerbotten	18–19 June	(Sweden) Robert Dahlgren	(Sweden) Robert Dahlgren	(Sweden) Robert Dahlgren	(Sweden) Cupra Dealer Team – PWR Racing
2	R2	(Sweden) Drivecenter Arena	Skellefteå, Västerbotten	18–19 June	(Sweden) Robert Dahlgren	(Sweden) Oliver Söderström	(Sweden) Robert Dahlgren	(Sweden) Cupra Dealer Team – PWR Racing
2	R3	(Sweden) Drivecenter Arena	Skellefteå, Västerbotten	18–19 June		(Sweden) Robert Dahlgren	(Sweden) Tobias Brink	(Sweden) Brink Motorsport
3	R1	(Sweden) Gelleråsen Arena	Karlskoga, Örebro	21–22 August	(Sweden) Robert Dahlgren	(Sweden) Robert Dahlgren	(Sweden) Robert Dahlgren	(Sweden) Cupra Dealer Team – PWR Racing
3	R2	(Sweden) Gelleråsen Arena	Karlskoga, Örebro	21–22 August	(Sweden) Robert Dahlgren	(Sweden) Robert Dahlgren	(Sweden) Robert Dahlgren	(Sweden) Cupra Dealer Team – PWR Racing
3	R3	(Sweden) Gelleråsen Arena	Karlskoga, Örebro	21–22 August		(Sweden) Oliver Söderström	(Sweden) Kevin Engman	(Sweden) Brink Motorsport
4	R1	(Sweden) Anderstorp Raceway	Anderstorp, Jönköping	4–5 September	(Sweden) Robert Dahlgren	(Sweden) Robert Dahlgren	(Sweden) Robert Dahlgren	(Sweden) Cupra Dealer Team – PWR Racing
4	R2	(Sweden) Anderstorp Raceway	Anderstorp, Jönköping	4–5 September	(Sweden) Robert Dahlgren	(Sweden) Hugo Nerman	(Sweden) Robert Dahlgren	(Sweden) Cupra Dealer Team – PWR Racing
4	R3	(Sweden) Anderstorp Raceway	Anderstorp, Jönköping	4–5 September		(Sweden) Robin Knutsson	(Sweden) Robin Knutsson	(Sweden) Lestrup Racing Team
5	R1	(Sweden) Mantorp Park	Mantorp, Östergötland	2–3 October	(Sweden) Robert Dahlgren	(Sweden) Robert Dahlgren	(Sweden) Robert Dahlgren	(Sweden) Cupra Dealer Team – PWR Racing
5	R2	(Sweden) Mantorp Park	Mantorp, Östergötland	2–3 October	(Sweden) Andreas Bäckman	(Sweden) Mikaela Åhlin-Kottulinsky	(Sweden) Robert Dahlgren	(Sweden) Cupra Dealer Team – PWR Racing
5	R3	(Sweden) Mantorp Park	Mantorp, Östergötland	2–3 October		(Sweden) Mikaela Åhlin-Kottulinsky	(Sweden) Mikaela Åhlin-Kottulinsky	(Sweden) Cupra Dealer Team – PWR Racing
6	R1	(Sweden) Ring Knutstorp	Kågeröd, Skåne	8–9 October	(Sweden) Robert Dahlgren	(Sweden) Robert Dahlgren	(Sweden) Mikaela Åhlin-Kottulinsky	(Sweden) Cupra Dealer Team – PWR Racing
6	R2	(Sweden) Ring Knutstorp	Kågeröd, Skåne	8–9 October	(Sweden) Robert Dahlgren	(Sweden) Robert Dahlgren	(Sweden) Robert Dahlgren	(Sweden) Cupra Dealer Team – PWR Racing
6	R3	(Sweden) Ring Knutstorp	Kågeröd, Skåne	8–9 October		(Sweden) Mikael Karlsson	(Sweden) Mikael Karlsson	(Sweden) Lestrup Racing Team

== Championship standings ==
A new scoring system was introduced for the season, with points now being handed to the top 15 finishers.

Position	**1st**	**2nd**	**3rd**	**4th**	**5th**	**6th**	**7th**	**8th**	**9th**	**10th**	**11th**	**12th**	**13th**	**14th**	**15th**
Qualifying 2	5	4	3	2	1	—N/a									
Race	20	17	15	13	11	10	9	8	7	6	5	4	3	2	1

=== Drivers' Championship ===
Pos.	Driver	LJU (Sweden)			SKE (Sweden)			GEL (Sweden)			AND (Sweden)			MAN (Sweden)			KNU (Sweden)			Pts
Pos.	Driver	RD1	RD2	RD3	RD1	RD2	RD3	RD1	RD2	RD3	RD1	RD2	RD3	RD1	RD2	RD3	RD1	RD2	RD3	Pts
1	(Sweden) Robert Dahlgren	**1**	**1**^{1}	3	**1**	**1**^{1}	2	**1**	**1**^{1}	5	**1**	**1**^{1}	4	**1**	1^{2}	2	**2**	**1**^{1}	5	350
2	(Sweden) Mikaela Åhlin-Kottulinsky	2	3^{3}	Ret	5	2^{3}	6	2	2^{2}	3	2	2^{5}	9	6	5	1	1	2^{3}	9	259
3	(Sweden) Tobias Brink	4	2^{2}	7	6	6	1	7	8	2	6	4^{2}	5	3	4^{3}	3	3	3^{2}	2	252
4	(Sweden) Oliver Söderström	3	4^{4}	4	NC	4	5	9	3^{3}	8	3	3^{4}	6	5	2^{4}	4	4	6^{4}	6	220
5	(Sweden) Mattias Andersson	6	6	1	3	3^{2}	9	12†	4^{5}	7	8	6	7	2	3^{5}	Ret	5	4^{5}	7	202
6	(Sweden) Hugo Nerman	12	8	2	11	13	7	3	6	4	4	5^{3}	3	9	6	DNS	6	5	3	179
7	(Sweden) Mikael Karlsson	7	5^{5}	8	4	7^{4}	11	4	5^{4}	11	7	11	12	4	11	8	7	7	1	171
8	(Sweden) Andreas Ahlberg	5	7	9	2	8	4	6	9	9	9	13	8	8	10	7	8	10	10	150
9	(Sweden) Robin Knutsson	9	9	Ret	10	9	10	5	10	6	5	8	1	7	7	6	9	9	8	149
10	(Sweden) Isac Aronsson	8	10	6	8	10	12†	13	13	12	11	9	11	13	8	11	11	11	12	99
11	(Sweden) Albin Wärnelöv	11	Ret	DNS	9	11	8	10	11	10	10	12	10	12	9	9	12	12	11	89
12	(Sweden) Rasmus Hedberg	10	12	5	Ret	12	DSQ	11	12	13	12	10	13	11	12	10	13	13	13	74
13	(Sweden) Hannes Morin	Ret	11	Ret	7	5^{5}	3													41
14	(Sweden) Kevin Engman							8	7	1										37
15	(Sweden) Jessica Bäckman										13†	7	2							29
16	(Norway) Magnus Gustavsen																10	8	4	27
17	(Sweden) Andreas Bäckman													10	**Ret**^{1}	5				22

Colour	Result
Gold	Winner
Silver	Second place
Bronze	Third place
Green	Points classification
Blue	Non-points classification
Blue	Non-classified finish (NC)
Purple	Retired, not classified (Ret)
Red	Did not qualify (DNQ)
Red	Did not pre-qualify (DNPQ)
Black	Disqualified (DSQ)
White	Did not start (DNS)
White	Withdrew (WD)
White	Race cancelled (C)
Blank	Did not practice (DNP)
Blank	Did not arrive (DNA)
Blank	Excluded (EX)

**Bold** – Pole
Italics – Fastest Lap
† — Did not finish, but classified
