= 2026 Porsche Carrera Cup Benelux =

Motorsport season

The 2026 Porsche Carrera Cup Benelux was the 14th season of Porsche Carrera Cup Benelux. It began at the Circuit de Spa-Francorchamps on 7 May and finished at the Circuit Zolder on 18 October.

Milan Marczak won the Drivers' Championship

== Teams and drivers ==
Team	No.	Driver	Class	Rounds
(Germany) a-workx by KATANA Tools	2	(Germany) Alex Hardt	P	1
(Germany) a-workx by KATANA Tools	18	(United States) Henry Wheeler	R	All
(Germany) a-workx by KATANA Tools	107	(Austria) Felix Neuhofer	P	5–6
(Belgium) Team RaceArt	5	(Netherlands) Joep Breedveld	R	All
(Belgium) Team RaceArt	63	(Belgium) Arthur Peters	R	All
(Belgium) Team RaceArt	69	(Netherlands) Jaap van Lagen	P	All
(Netherlands) PG Motorsport	8	(Netherlands) Joep Muller	R	All
(Netherlands) PG Motorsport	13	(Netherlands) Mees Muller	P	1–3, 5–6
(Belgium) Ajith – Redant Racing	10	(Belgium) Mauro Polderman	R	6
(Belgium) Ajith – Redant Racing	29	(Netherlands) Jesse Polderdijk	R	All
(Belgium) Ajith – Redant Racing	96	(Poland) Milan Marczak	P	All
(Belgium) Mama's Nightmare by NGT	11	(Belgium) Wouter Manderveld	R	6
(Netherlands) Team GP Elite	12	(Germany) Maik Rosenberg	PA	1
(Netherlands) Team GP Elite	19	(Netherlands) Dino van der Geest	R	1–2
(Netherlands) Team GP Elite	77	(Poland) David Dziwok	R	All
(Netherlands) Team GP Elite	83	(Japan) Makoto Haga	PA	1, 3
(Netherlands) Team GP Elite	95	(Netherlands) Thijn van Berkel	R	1
(Belgium) Speedlover	17	(Belgium) Nick Hunter	PA	1
(Belgium) NGT Racing	22	(Andorra) Frank Porté Ruiz	P	1–4
(Belgium) NGT Racing	32	(Sweden) Robin Knutsson	P	1
(Belgium) NGT Racing	92	(Belgium) Bertrand Baguette	P	1
(Estonia) Quanloop EST1 Racing	27	(Cyprus) Tio Ellinas	P	1–2
(Estonia) Quanloop EST1 Racing	27	(Netherlands) Paul Meijer	P	4–6
(Estonia) Quanloop EST1 Racing	28	(Estonia) Alexander Reimann	P	All
(Estonia) Quanloop EST1 Racing	72	(Saudi Arabia) Ali Al-Juffali	R	1–3, 5
(Finland) 39 Racing	39	(Finland) Jani Käkelä	PA	All
(Poland) Jachu Racing	40	(Poland) Jan Antoszewski	R	5
(Netherlands) JW Raceservice	14	(Netherlands) Boudewijn Kuster	P	4
(Netherlands) JW Raceservice	17	(Netherlands) Leon Van Verseveld	R	6
(Netherlands) JW Raceservice	44	(Poland) Jakub Twaróg	R	1–4
(Netherlands) JW Raceservice	55	(Poland) Karol Kręt	P	All
(Netherlands) JW Raceservice	67	(Singapore) Tzeyang Moh	PA	5
(Netherlands) MDM Motorsport	919	(Denmark) Hjelte Hoffner	P	All
(Netherlands) MDM Motorsport	977	(Netherlands) Levent Türkmen	PA	1, 4–6
(Netherlands) MDM Motorsport	998	(Germany) Jan Seyffert	P	1–5

Icon	Class
P	Pro Cup
PA	Pro-Am Cup
R	Rookie
	Guest Starter

== Calendar ==
Round	Circuit	Date	Supporting
1	Circuit de Spa-Francorchamps, Stavelot, Belgium	7–9 May	FIA World Endurance Championship; Legends of Le Mans Series
2	Circuit Zandvoort, Zandvoort, Netherlands	22–24 May	Deutsche Tourenwagen Masters; Formula Regional European Championship; ADAC GT Masters; Porsche Carrera Cup Germany
3	Imola Circuit, Imola, Italy	3–4 July	European Le Mans Series; Eurocup-3
4	TT Circuit Assen, Assen, Netherlands	31 July–2 August	Supercar Challenge; Big Open Single Seaters GP
5	Hockenheimring, Hockenheim, Germany	11–13 September	Formula Regional European Championship; Euroformula Open Championship; International GT Open; Supercar Challenge
6	Circuit Zolder, Heusden-Zolder, Belgium	16–18 October	NASCAR Euro Series; Belcar Endurance Championship

== Race results ==
Round		Circuit	Pole position	Overall winner	Pro-Am Winner	Rookie winner
1	R1	(Belgium) Circuit de Spa-Francorchamps	(Germany) Alex Hardt	(Germany) Alex Hardt	(Finland) Jani Käkelä	(United States) Henry Wheeler
1	R2	(Belgium) Circuit de Spa-Francorchamps	(Estonia) Alexander Reimann	(Estonia) Alexander Reimann	(Finland) Jani Käkelä	(Poland) David Dziwok
2	R3	(Netherlands) Circuit Zandvoort	(Netherlands) Jaap van Lagen	(Poland) Milan Marczak	(Finland) Jani Käkelä	(Poland) David Dziwok
2	R4	(Netherlands) Circuit Zandvoort	(Netherlands) Jaap van Lagen	(Netherlands) Jaap van Lagen	(Finland) Jani Käkelä	(Netherlands) Joep Breedveld
3	R5	(Italy) Imola Circuit	(Poland) Milan Marczak	(Poland) Milan Marczak	(Finland) Jani Käkelä	(Netherlands) Joep Muller
3	R6	(Italy) Imola Circuit	(Poland) Milan Marczak	(Netherlands) Jaap van Lagen	(Finland) Jani Käkelä	(Netherlands) Joep Muller
4	R7	(Netherlands) TT Circuit Assen	(Netherlands) Boudewijn Kuster	(Netherlands) Jaap van Lagen	(Finland) Jani Käkelä	(Poland) David Dziwok
4	R8	(Netherlands) TT Circuit Assen	(Netherlands) Boudewijn Kuster	(Poland) Milan Marczak	(Netherlands) Levent Türkmen	(Poland) David Dziwok
5	R9	(Germany) Hockenheimring	(Netherlands) Jaap van Lagen	(Poland) Milan Marczak	(Finland) Jani Käkelä	(Poland) David Dziwok
5	R10	(Germany) Hockenheimring	(Netherlands) Jaap van Lagen	(Netherlands) Jaap van Lagen	(Finland) Jani Käkelä	(Netherlands) Joep Muller
6	R11	(Belgium) Circuit Zolder	(Poland) Milan Marczak	(Poland) Milan Marczak	(Finland) Jani Käkelä	(Netherlands) Joep Muller
6	R12	(Belgium) Circuit Zolder	(Poland) Milan Marczak	(Poland) Milan Marczak	(Finland) Jani Käkelä	(Netherlands) Joep Muller

== Championship standings ==
=== Scoring system ===
Position	**1st**	**2nd**	**3rd**	**4th**	**5th**	**6th**	**7th**	**8th**	**9th**	**10th**	**11th**	**12th**	**13th**	**14th**	**15th**	Pole (R1)
Points	25	20	16	13	11	10	9	8	7	6	5	4	3	2	1	1

=== Overall ===
Pos	Driver	Team	SPA (Belgium)		ZAN (Netherlands)		IMO (Italy)		ASS (Netherlands)		HOC (Germany)		ZOL (Belgium)		Pts
Pos	Driver	Team	R1	R2	R3	R4	R5	R6	R7	R8	R9	R10	R11	R12	Pts
1	(Poland) Milan Marczak	(Belgium) Ajith – Redant Racing	6	10	1	2	**1**	**2**	3	1	1	2	**1**	**1**	248
2	(Netherlands) Jaap van Lagen	(Belgium) Team RaceArt	3	3	**2**	**1**	Ret	1	1	6	**Ret**	**1**	2	2	213
3	(Estonia) Alexander Reimann	(Estonia) Quanloop EST1 Racing	2	**1**	6	3	9	3	7	5	10	7	Ret	8	149
4	(Denmark) Hjelte Hoffner	(Netherlands) MDM Motorsport	8	4	5	5	16	6	14	4	12	9	7	3	116
5	(Netherlands) Joep Muller	(Netherlands) PG Motorsport	Ret	DNS	9	9	2	4	10	10	7	5	4	6	106
6	(Netherlands) Paul Meijer	(Estonia) Quanloop EST1 Racing							2	2	2	4	3	5	102
7	(Germany) Jan Seyffert	(Netherlands) MDM Motorsport	11	11	DSQ	6	3	5	6	14	4	3			96
8	(Andorra) Frank Porté Ruiz	(Belgium) NGT Racing	4	5	4	4	6	9	5	Ret					85
9	(Poland) David Dziwok	(Netherlands) Team GP Elite	14	7	7	10	4	Ret	8	7	3	Ret	11	19	86
10	(Netherlands) Joep Breedveld	(Belgium) Team RaceArt	17	12	8	8	8	11	9	8	9	8	Ret	9	82
11	(United States) Henry Wheeler	(Germany) a-workx by KATANA Tools	12	13	15	14	10	12	13	9	5	6	8	11	76
12	(Poland) Karol Kręt	(Netherlands) JW Raceservice	16	14	11	13	7	7	11	Ret	11	10	13	16	62
13	(Belgium) Arthur Peters	(Belgium) Team RaceArt	13	16	12	11	5	8	12	Ret	14	11	12	18	59
14	(Netherlands) Mees Muller	(Netherlands) PG Motorsport	7	15	10	12	11	10			16	Ret	10	10	52
15	(Cyprus) Tio Ellinas	(Estonia) Quanloop EST1 Racing	5	6	3	7									49
16	(Finland) Jani Käkelä	(Finland) 39 Racing	19	19	13	15	12	13	15	13	15	12	15	15	33
17	(Netherlands) Jesse Polderdijk	(Belgium) Ajith – Redant Racing	18	Ret	14	16	14	15	Ret	Ret	13	Ret	9	14	26
18	(Netherlands) Levent Türkmen	(Netherlands) MDM Motorsport	23	21					19	12	18	Ret	16	17	11
19	(Netherlands) Dino van der Geest	(Netherlands) Team GP Elite	15	17	16	19			17	15					8
20	(Saudi Arabia) Ali Al-Juffali	(Estonia) Quanloop EST1 Racing	20	Ret	17	18	15	16	18	11	17	Ret			8
21	(Poland) Jakub Twaróg	(Netherlands) JW Raceservice	22	18	18	17	13	14	16	Ret					7
22	(Netherlands) Thijn van Berkel	(Netherlands) Team GP Elite	Ret	DNS											0
Guest drivers ineligible to score points
—	(Germany) Alex Hardt	(Germany) a-workx by KATANA Tools	**1**	2											–
—	(Netherlands) Boudewijn Kuster	(Netherlands) JW Raceservice							**4**	**3**					–
—	(Austria) Felix Neuhofer	(Germany) a-workx by KATANA Tools									8	Ret	5	4	–
—	(Belgium) Mauro Polderman	(Belgium) Ajith – Redant Racing											6	7	–
—	(Poland) Jan Antoszewski	(Poland) Jachu Racing									6	Ret			–
—	(Belgium) Bertrand Baguette	(Belgium) NGT Racing	10	8											–
—	(Sweden) Robin Knutsson	(Belgium) NGT Racing	9	9											–
—	(Netherlands) Leon Van Verseveld	(Netherlands) JW Raceservice											DNS	12	–
—	(Belgium) Wouter Manderveld	(Belgium) Mama's Nightmare by NGT											14	13	–
—	(Japan) Makoto Haga	(Netherlands) Team GP Elite	24	22			17	17							–
—	(Germany) Maik Rosenberg	(Netherlands) Team GP Elite	21	20											–
—	(Singapore) Tzeyang Moh	(Netherlands) JW Raceservice									WD	WD			–
Pos	Driver	Team	SPA (Belgium)		ZAN (Netherlands)		IMO (Italy)		ASS (Netherlands)		HOC (Germany)		ZOL (Belgium)		Pts

Colour	Result
Gold	Winner
Silver	Second place
Bronze	Third place
Green	Points classification
Blue	Non-points classification
Blue	Non-classified finish (NC)
Purple	Retired, not classified (Ret)
Red	Did not qualify (DNQ)
Red	Did not pre-qualify (DNPQ)
Black	Disqualified (DSQ)
White	Did not start (DNS)
White	Withdrew (WD)
White	Race cancelled (C)
Blank	Did not practice (DNP)
Blank	Did not arrive (DNA)
Blank	Excluded (EX)

**Bold** – Pole

Italics – Fastest Lap

† — Did not finish, but classified

=== Pro-Am ===
Pos	Driver	Team	SPA (Belgium)		ZAN (Netherlands)		IMO (Italy)		ASS (Netherlands)		HOC (Germany)		ZOL (Belgium)		Pts
Pos	Driver	Team	R1	R2	R3	R4	R5	R6	R7	R8	R9	R10	R11	R12	Pts
1	(Finland) Jani Käkelä	(Finland) 39 Racing	**1**	**1**	**1**	**1**	**1**	**1**	**1**	**2**	**1**	**1**	**1**	**1**	301
2	(Netherlands) Levent Türkmen	(Netherlands) MDM Motorsport	3	3					2	1	2	Ret	2	2	145
Guest drivers ineligible to score points
—	(Japan) Makoto Haga	(Netherlands) Team GP Elite	4	4			2	2							–
—	(Germany) Maik Rosenberg	(Netherlands) Team GP Elite	2	2											–
—	(Singapore) Tzeyang Moh	(Netherlands) JW Raceservice									WD	WD			–
Pos	Driver	Team	SPA (Belgium)		ZAN (Netherlands)		IMO (Italy)		ASS (Netherlands)		HOC (Germany)		ZOL (Belgium)		Pts

=== Rookie ===
Pos	Driver	Team	SPA (Belgium)		ZAN (Netherlands)		IMO (Italy)		ASS (Netherlands)		HOC (Germany)		ZOL (Belgium)		Pts
Pos	Driver	Team	R1	R2	R3	R4	R5	R6	R7	R8	R9	R10	R11	R12	Pts
1	(Netherlands) Joep Muller	(Netherlands) PG Motorsport	**Ret**	**DNS**	3	2	**1**	**1**	**3**	4	4	1	**1**	**1**	210
2	(Netherlands) Joep Breedveld	(Belgium) Team RaceArt	5	2	**2**	**1**	4	3	2	**2**	5	3	Ret	3	195
3	(Poland) David Dziwok	(Netherlands) Team GP Elite	3	1	1	3	2	Ret	1	1	1	Ret	5	9	190
4	(United States) Henry Wheeler	(Germany) a-workx by KATANA Tools	1	3	6	5	5	4	5	3	**2**	**2**	3	4	190
5	(Belgium) Arthur Peters	(Belgium) Team RaceArt	2	4	4	4	3	2	4	Ret	7	4	6	8	153
6	(Netherlands) Jesse Polderdijk	(Belgium) Ajith – Redant Racing	6	Ret	5	6	7	6	9	Ret	7	Ret	4	7	97
7	(Saudi Arabia) Ali Al-Juffali	(Estonia) Quanloop EST1 Racing	7	Ret	8	8	8	7	8	6	8	Ret			70
8	(Poland) Jakub Twaróg	(Netherlands) JW Raceservice	8	6	9	7	6	5	6	Ret					65
9	(Netherlands) Dino van der Geest	(Netherlands) Team GP Elite	4	5	7	9			7	6					59
10	(Netherlands) Thijn van Berkel	(Netherlands) Team GP Elite	Ret	DNS											0
Guest drivers ineligible to score points
—	(Belgium) Mauro Polderman	(Belgium) Ajith – Redant Racing											2	2	–
—	(Poland) Jan Antoszewski	(Poland) Jachu Racing									3	Ret			–
—	(Netherlands) Leon Van Verseveld	(Netherlands) JW Raceservice											DNS	5	–
—	(Belgium) Wouter Manderveld	(Belgium) Mama's Nightmare by NGT											7	6	–
Pos	Driver	Team	SPA (Belgium)		ZAN (Netherlands)		IMO (Italy)		ASS (Netherlands)		HOC (Germany)		ZOL (Belgium)		Pts

=== Teams ===
==== Scoring system ====
- Results for teams are awarded independently from the drivers' championship.
- Only the best two results count for teams fielding more than two entries.

Pos	Team	Pts
1	(Estonia) Quanloop EST1 Racing	301
2	(Belgium) Team RaceArt	293
3	(Belgium) Ajith – Redant Racing	273
4	(Netherlands) MDM Motorsport	212
5	(Netherlands) PG Motorsport	95
6	(Netherlands) Team GP Elite	93
7	(Belgium) NGT Racing	85
8	(Germany) a-workx by KATANA Tools	76
9	(Netherlands) JW Raceservice	69
10	(Finland) 39 Racing	33
Pos	Team	Pts
