= Robin Knutsson =

Swedish racing driver (born 2002)

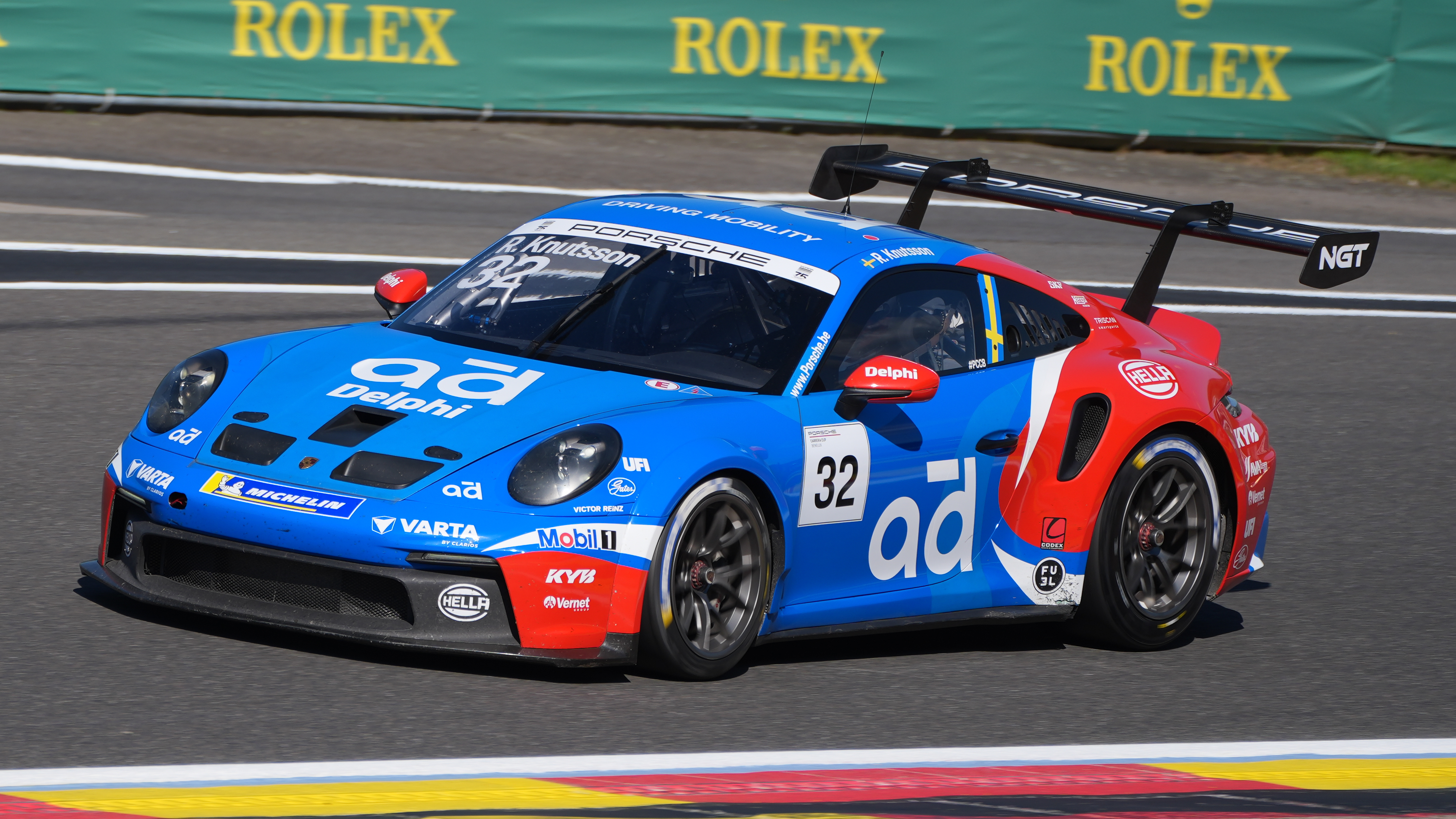
- Knutsson in 2026
- Nationality: (Sweden) Swedish
- Born: 2 March 2002 (age 24) Gothenburg, Sweden

GT World Challenge Europe career
- Debut season: 2026
- Current team: Boutsen VDS
- Categorisation: FIA Silver
- Car number: 10
- Starts: 14
- Wins: 0
- Podiums: 0
- Poles: 0
- Fastest laps: 0
- Best finish: 58th in 2026

Previous series
- 2022–2024 2021: Porsche Carrera Cup Scandinavia; STCC TCR Scandinavia

Championship titles
- 2025: Belcar

Robin Knutsson (born 2 March 2002) is a Swedish racing driver who last competed in GT World Challenge Europe for Boutsen VDS. He has won the 24 Hours of Zolder and Belcar overall for D'Ieteren Luxury Performance by NGT.

== Career ==
Knutsson began karting at the age of five, competing until 2020. Primarily racing in Sweden, Knutsson most notably finished runner-up in the 2019 Swedish Championship in Senior 125, as well as sixth in the Rotax Max Euro Trophy the same year.

In 2021, Knutsson moved up to touring car racing, joining Lestrup Racing Team to compete in the STCC TCR Scandinavia Touring Car Championship. In his debut season, Knutsson scored a lone win at Anderstorp en route to ninth in points. In 2022, Knutsson moved to sports car racing, joining WestCoast Racing for his rookie season in Porsche Carrera Cup Scandinavia, where he took a podium at Skellefteå to end the season eighth overall. Towards the end of the year, Knutsson also entered the final round of Porsche Carrera Cup Benelux at the Hockenheimring, finishing fifth and fourth in the two races.

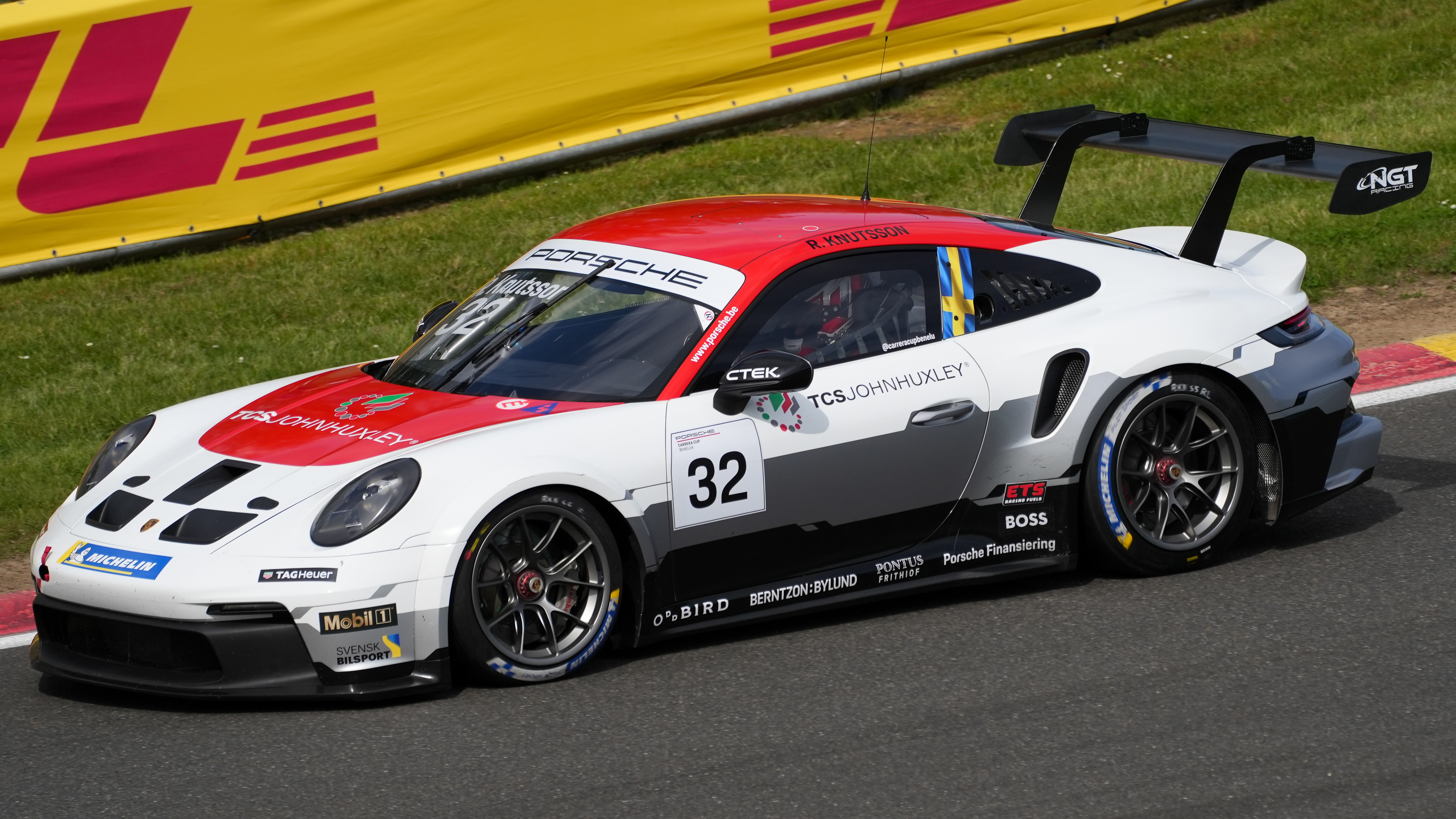
Knutsson driving for NGT in Porsche Carrera Cup Benelux at Spa in 2024.

Remaining with WestCoast Racing for 2023, Knutsson raced in Porsche Sprint Challenge Southern Europe and Porsche Carrera Cup Scandinavia. Knutsson most notably finished second overall at the headline Le Mans race in the latter to finish eighth in points again, as he also made two more Porsche Carrera Cup Benelux cameos for Revs Motorsport. Staying on for 2024, Knutsson had a breakout year in Scandinavia, winning three times across both Gelleråsen rounds to end the season fourth overall. In parallel, Knutsson ran the first four rounds of Porsche Carrera Cup Benelux for NGT Racing, in which he scored four podiums, and won the 24 Hours of Zolder overall for D'Ieteren Luxury Performance by NGT. Remaining with NGT for his first full season in Benelux in 2025, Knutsson scored wins at Spa and Assen to secure a third-place points finish. That year, Knutsson also helped D'Ieteren win the Belcar Endurance Championship with a win and a second place.

Knutsson graduated to GT3 in 2026, signing with Boutsen VDS to drive a Porsche 911 GT3 R (992.2) in the GT World Challenge Europe Endurance and Sprint Cups. His debut rounds in GTWC were marred by three consecutive lap 1 crashes, before Knutsson, Gilles Magnus and Alessandro Ghiretti bounced back with a Gold Cup podium at the 24 Hours of Spa. Knutsson and Magnus then took a class win at the sprint round in Magny-Cours. Following that, Knutsson secured a class podium at Zandvoort to take sixth in the class' sprint standings, while ending his Endurance campaign seventh in points with an additional class podium at the Nürburgring. That year, Knutsson also made a one-off return to Porsche Carrera Cup Benelux for NGT Racing.

== Karting record ==
=== Karting career summary ===
Season	Series	Team	Position
2017	Rotax Max Challenge Sweden – Junior Max		5th
2017	Juniorfestivalen – Junior 125		11th
2017	Kristianstad KK Grande Finale – Junior Max		2nd
2017	Göteborgs Stora Pris – OK		
2018	Rotax Max Euro Trophy – Senior Max		9th
2018	Swedish Karting League – OK		25th
2018	Swedish Championship – Senior 125		8th
2018	IAME Euro Series – X30 Senior	KR-Sport	
2018	Karting World Championship – OK	Ward Racing	56th
2018	IAME International Final – X30 Senior	West Speed Racing	NC
2019	IAME Winter Cup – X30 Senior		
2019	Rotax Max Euro Trophy – Senior Max		6th
2019	Swedish Championship – Senior 125		2nd
2019	IAME Euro Series – X30 Senior		56th
2019	RMC International Trophy – Senior Max	KR-Sport	18th
2019	Kartmasters British GP – Rotax Senior		
2019	IAME International Final – X30 Senior		29th
2019	SKUSA SuperNationals – X30 Senior		18th
2020	Rotax Max Euro Winter Cup – Senior Max	KR-Sport	47th
2020	Rotax Max Euro Trophy – Senior Max		27th
2020	Rotax Max Euro Trophy – DD2		
2020	Rotax Max Challenge Sweden – Senior Max		4th

== Racing record ==
=== Racing career summary ===
Season	Series	Team	Races	Wins	Poles	F/Laps	Podiums	Points	Position
2021	STCC TCR Scandinavia Touring Car Championship	Lestrup Racing Team	18	1	0	0	1	149	9th
2022	Porsche Carrera Cup Scandinavia	WestCoast Racing	14	0	0	0	1	91	8th
2022	Porsche Carrera Cup Benelux	WestCoast Racing	2	0	0	0	0		
2023	Porsche Sprint Challenge Southern Europe – Pro	WestCoast Racing	6	0	0	0	0	60	7th
2023	Porsche Carrera Cup Scandinavia	WCR-Pampas	9	0	0	0	1	85	8th
2023	Porsche Carrera Cup Benelux	Revs Motorsport	4	0	0	0	0	29	19th
2024	Porsche Sprint Challenge Southern Europe – Pro	WestCoast Racing	6	0	0	0	1	42	13th
2024	Porsche Carrera Cup Scandinavia	WestCoast Racing	10	3	1	1	6	174	4th
2024	Porsche Carrera Cup Benelux	NGT Racing	8	0	0	0	4	81	10th
2024	24 Hours of Zolder	D'Ieteren Luxury Performance by NGT	1	1	0	0	1	—N/a	**1st**
2025	Porsche Sprint Challenge Southern Europe – Pro	NGT Racing	4	0	0	0	0	21	18th
2025	Porsche Carrera Cup Benelux	NGT Racing	12	2	2	2	7	188	**3rd**
2025	Belcar Endurance Championship	D'Ieteren Luxury Performance by NGT	2	1	0	0	2	277‡	**1st‡**
2025	24 Hours of Zolder – GT Cup	D'Ieteren Luxury Performance by NGT	1	0	0	0	1	—N/a	**2nd**
2025	McLaren Trophy Europe – Pro	ALM Motorsport	4	0	0	0	0	27	7th
2025	992 Endurance Cup – Pro	EST1 Racing	1	0	0	0	0	—N/a	4th
2026	GT World Challenge Europe Endurance Cup	Boutsen VDS	5	0	0	0	0	4	30th
2026	GT World Challenge Europe Endurance Cup – Gold	Boutsen VDS	5	0	0	0	2	48	7th
2026	GT World Challenge Europe Sprint Cup	Boutsen VDS	9	0	0	0	0	3	27th
2026	GT World Challenge Europe Sprint Cup – Gold	Boutsen VDS	9	1	2	0	2	66.5	6th
2026	Intercontinental GT Challenge	Boutsen VDS	1	0	0	0	0	0	NC
2026	Porsche Carrera Cup Benelux	NGT Racing	2	0	0	0	0	0	NC†

* Season still in progress.
^{†} As Knutsson was a guest driver, he was ineligible for points.

=== Complete Scandinavian Touring Car Championship results ===
(key) (Races in bold indicate pole position) (Races in italics indicate fastest lap)

Year	Team	Car	1	2	3	4	5	6	7	8	9	10	11	12	13	14	15	16	17	18	DC	Points
2021	Lestrup Racing Team	Volkswagen Golf GTI TCR	LJU; 1; 9	LJU; 2; 9	LJU; 3 Ret	SKE; 1; 10	SKE; 2; 9	SKE; 3; 10	KAR; 1; 5	KAR; 2; 10	KAR; 3; 6	AND; 1; 5	AND; 2; 8	AND; 3; 1	MAN; 1; 7	MAN; 2; 7	MAN; 3; 6	KNU; 1; 9	KNU; 2; 9	KNU; 3; 8	9th	149

=== Complete GT World Challenge Europe results ===
==== GT World Challenge Europe Endurance Cup ====
Year	Team	Car	Class	1	2	3	4	5	6	7	Pos	Points
2026	Boutsen VDS	Porsche 911 GT3 R (992.2)	Gold	LEC; Ret	MNZ; Ret	SPA; 6H; 17	SPA; 12H; 16	SPA; 24H; 22	NÜR; 8	ALG; Ret	7th	48

==== GT World Challenge Europe Sprint Cup ====
(key) (Races in bold indicate pole position; results in italics indicate fastest lap)

Year	Team	Car	Class	1	2	3	4	5	6	7	8	9	10	Pos.	Points
2026	Boutsen VDS	Porsche 911 GT3 R (992.2)	Gold	BRH; 1 Ret	**BRH**; **2** DNS	MIS; 1; 17	MIS; 2; 19	**MAG**; **1**; 8	MAG; 2; 24	ZAN; 1; 11	ZAN; 2; 10	CAT; 1; 19	CAT; 2; 28	6th	66.5
