= Tom Van Rompuy =

Belgian racing driver (born 1987)

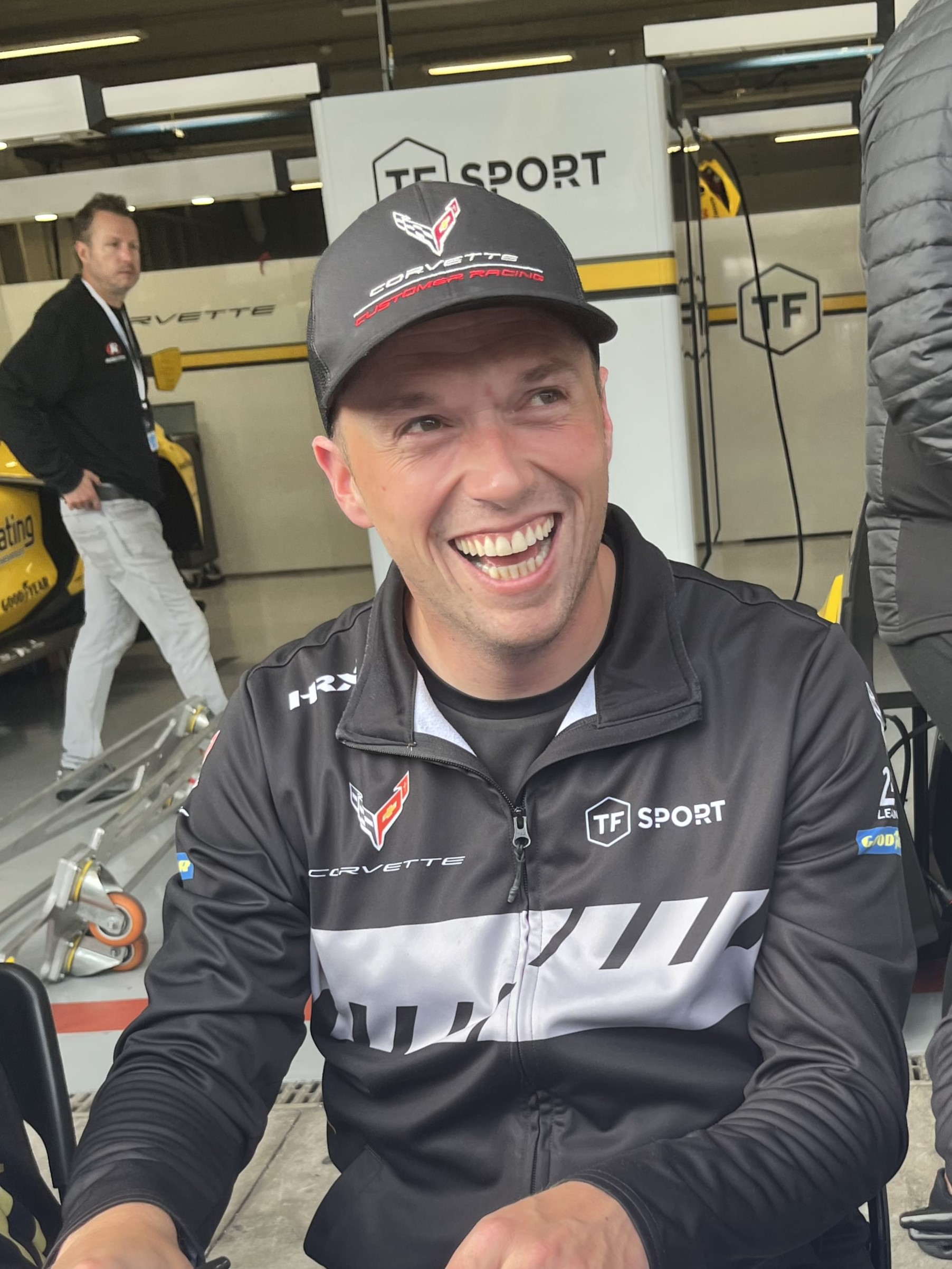
- Van Rompuy at the 2025 6 Hours of São Paulo
- Nationality: (Belgium) Belgian
- Born: Tom Karel Lily Van Rompuy; 8 September 1987 (age 39) Antwerp, Belgium

FIA World Endurance Championship career
- Debut season: 2024
- Current team: Akkodis ASP Team
- Categorisation: FIA Bronze
- Car number: 78
- Former teams: TF Sport
- Starts: 19 (19 entries)
- Wins: 1
- Podiums: 5
- Poles: 2
- Fastest laps: 0
- Best finish: 5th (LMGT3) in 2025

Tom Karel Lily Van Rompuy (born 8 September 1987) is a Belgian amateur racing driver currently competing in the FIA World Endurance Championship, driving for Akkodis ASP Team in the LMGT3 class.

Van Rompuy's career highlights include taking third place in the LMP2 Pro-Am subclass of the 2023 24 Hours of Le Mans, scoring the first ever LMGT3 pole in the WEC in Qatar, and winning the 6 Hours of Fuji.

== Racing record ==
=== Racing career summary ===
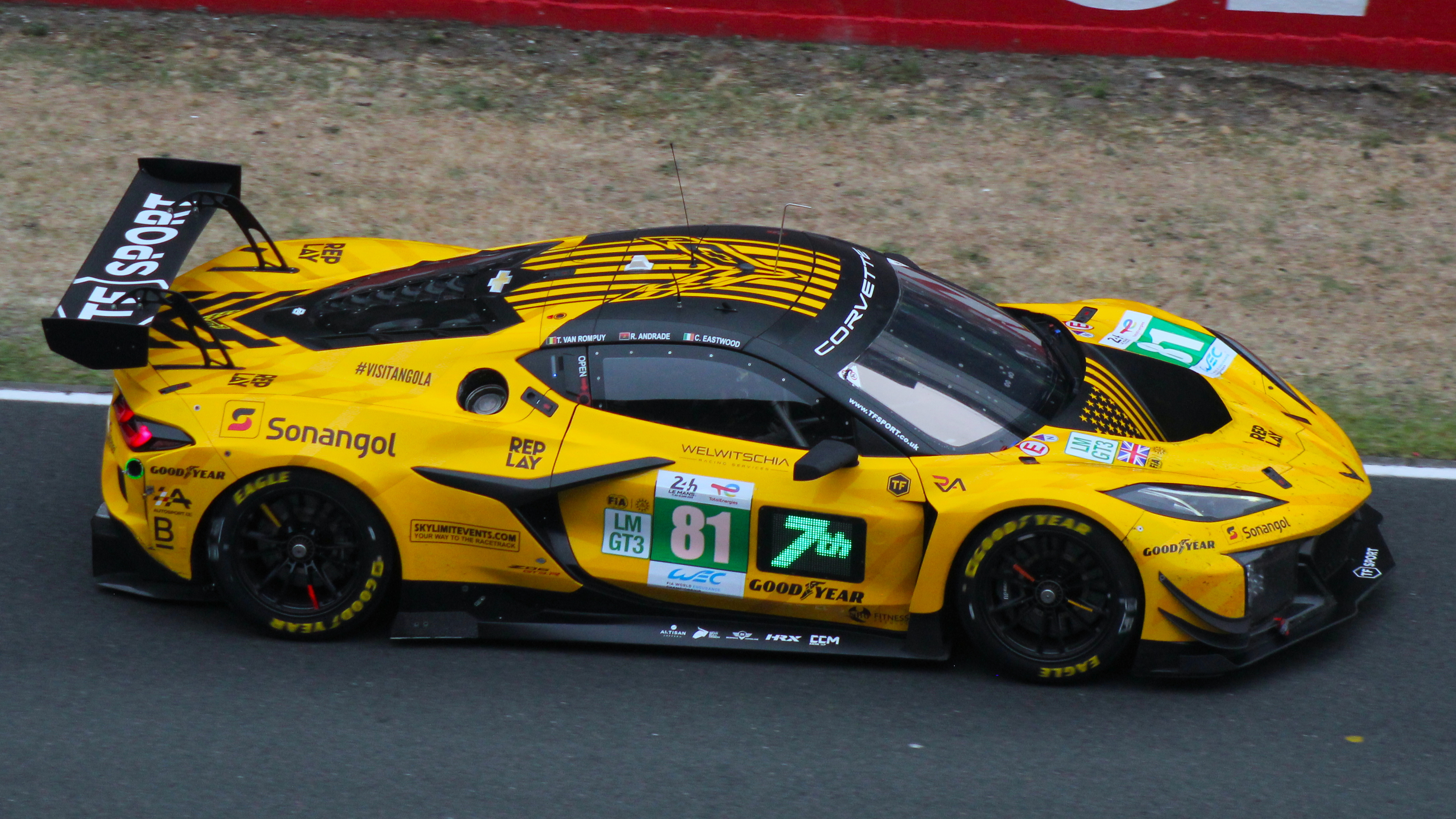
Van Rompuy's No. 81 car at the 2025 24 Hours of Le Mans

Season	Series	Team	Races	Wins	Poles	F/Laps	Podiums	Points	Position
2008	24 Hours of Zolder	First Motorsport	1	0	0	0	0	N/A	8th
2009	Belgian GT Championship	First Motorsport	1	0	0	0	0	13	27th
2009	24 Hours of Zolder	First Motorsport	1	0	0	0	0	N/A	6th
2010	Belgian Touring Car Series - T3	Denospi Racing	11	0	0	0	0	59	9th
2011	Belgian Touring Car Series - T4	Euroracing	13	7	1	1	12	148	**2nd**
2011	Belcar Endurance Championship	Belgium Racing	1	0	0	0	0	19	28th
2011	Bridgestone Special Open Trophy	Westfield Hasselt	2	0	0	0	1	0	NC†
2015	BMW M235i Racing Cup Belgium	Tuytte	1	0	0	0	0	11	36th
2015	Supercar Challenge - Supersport	EMG Motorsport	2	0	0	0	1	0	NC†
2017	24H Series - SP2	VDS Racing Adventures	1	0	0	0	1	0	NC†
2018	Belgian Endurance Championship	VR Racing/Qvick Motors	4	0	0	0	0	29.5	33rd
2018	24H GT Series - European - SP2	Qvick-VR Racing	0	0	0	0	0	0	NC
2019	24H Series - European - SPX	Vr Racing by Qvick Motors	2	1	0	0	1	0	NC†
2021	Belcar Endurance Championship - GT	VR Racing by Qvick Motorsport	1	0	0	0	1	0	NC†
2022	European Le Mans Series - LMP3	DKR Engineering	5	0	0	0	2	56	5th
2022	Ligier European Series - JS P4	DKR Engineering by HRC	2	0	0	0	0	18	12th
2023	Asian Le Mans Series - LMP3	DKR Engineering	4	1	0	0	1	43	4th
2023	European Le Mans Series - LMP2	DKR Engineering	5	0	0	0	0	28	13th
2023	24 Hours of Le Mans - LMP2	DKR Engineering	1	0	0	0	0	N/A	15th
2024	Prototype Winter Series - LMP3	DKR Engineering	2	0	0	0	2	10.715	11th
2024	FIA World Endurance Championship - LMGT3	TF Sport	8	0	1	0	1	50	10th
2024	24 Hours of Le Mans - LMGT3	TF Sport	1	0	0	0	0	N/A	15th
2025	Middle East Trophy - GT3	Comtoyou Racing	1	0	0	0	0	0	NC†
2025	FIA World Endurance Championship - LMGT3	TF Sport	8	1	0	0	3	81	5th
2025	24 Hours of Le Mans - LMGT3	TF Sport	1	0	0	0	1	N/A	**3rd**
2025	Belcar Endurance Championship - GT Cup	VR Racing by NGT	1	0	0	0	0	0	NC†
2025–26	Asian Le Mans Series - GT	Racing Team Turkey	6	0	0	0	0	13	19th
2026	FIA World Endurance Championship - LMGT3	Akkodis ASP Team	8	0	2	0	1	41	14th
2026–27	Asian Le Mans Series - LMP2	DKR Engineering							

^{†} As Van Rompuy was a guest driver, he was ineligible to score points.
^{*} Season still in progress.

=== Complete European Le Mans Series results ===
(key) (Races in bold indicate pole position; results in italics indicate fastest lap)

Year	Entrant	Class	Chassis	Engine	1	2	3	4	5	6	Rank	Points
2022	DKR Engineering	LMP3	Duqueine M30 - D08	Nissan VK56DE 5.6 L V8	LEC; 9	IMO; 5	MNZ	CAT; 2	SPA; 2	ALG; 6	5th	56
2023	DKR Engineering	LMP2 Pro-Am	Oreca 07	Gibson GK428 4.2 L V8	CAT; 11	LEC; 9	ARA; 8	SPA; 8	POR; 8	ALG; 6	12th	32

=== Complete Asian Le Mans Series results ===
(key) (Races in bold indicate pole position) (Races in italics indicate fastest lap)

Year	Team	Class	Car	Engine	1	2	3	4	5	6	Pos.	Points
2023	DKR Engineering	LMP3	Duqueine M30 - D08	Nissan VK56DE 5.6 L V8	DUB; 1; 6	DUB; 2; 1	ABU; 1; 5	ABU; 2 Ret			4th	43
2025–26	Racing Team Turkey	GT	Chevrolet Corvette Z06 GT3.R	Chevrolet LT6.R 5.5 L V8	SEP; 1; 8	SEP; 2; 19	DUB; 1; 8	DUB; 2; 9	ABU; 1 Ret	ABU; 2; 11	19th	13

=== 24 Hours of Le Mans results ===
Year	Team	Co-Drivers	Car	Class	Laps	Pos.	Class Pos.
2023	(Luxembourg) DKR Engineering	(Belgium) Maxime Martin (Belgium) Ugo de Wilde	Oreca 07-Gibson	LMP2	311	32nd	15th
2023	(Luxembourg) DKR Engineering	(Belgium) Maxime Martin (Belgium) Ugo de Wilde	Oreca 07-Gibson	LMP2 Pro-Am	311	32nd	3rd
2024	(United Kingdom) TF Sport	(Angola) Rui Andrade (Republic of Ireland) Charlie Eastwood	Chevrolet Corvette Z06 GT3.R	LMGT3	267	43rd	15th
2025	(United Kingdom) TF Sport	(Angola) Rui Andrade (Republic of Ireland) Charlie Eastwood	Chevrolet Corvette Z06 GT3.R	LMGT3	341	35th	**3rd**
2026	(France) Akkodis ASP Team	(France) Hadrien David (United Kingdom) Jack Hawksworth	Lexus RC F GT3	LMGT3	335	34th	2nd

=== Complete FIA World Endurance Championship results ===
(key) (Races in bold indicate pole position; races in italics indicate fastest lap)

Year	Entrant	Class	Car	Engine	1	2	3	4	5	6	7	8	Rank	Points
2024	TF Sport	LMGT3	Chevrolet Corvette Z06 GT3.R	Chevrolet LT6.R 5.5 L V8	**QAT**; Ret	IMO; 7	SPA; Ret	LMS; 12	SÃO; 8	COA; Ret	FUJ; 4	BHR; 2	10th	50
2025	TF Sport	LMGT3	Chevrolet Corvette Z06 GT3.R	Chevrolet LT6.R 5.5 L V8	QAT; Ret	IMO; 6	SPA; 14	LMS; 3	SÃO; 2	COA; 13	FUJ; 1	BHR; 11	5th	81
2026	Akkodis ASP Team	LMGT3	Lexus RC F GT3	Lexus 2UR-GSE 5.4 L V8	IMO; 14	**SPA**; Ret	LMS; 2	SÃO; 14	COA; Ret	FUJ; 9	CAT; 14	MNZ; 10	14th	41

^{*} Season still in progress.
