= Xavier Maassen =

Dutch racing driver (born 1980)

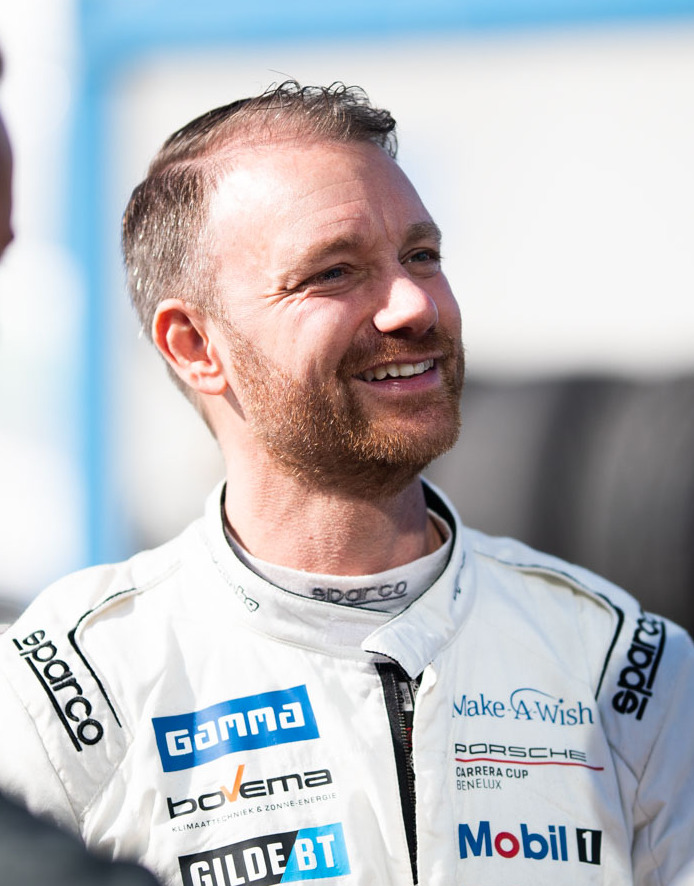
- Maassen in 2019
- Nationality: (Netherlands) Dutch
- Born: 22 June 1980 (age 46) Heerlen, Netherlands

Blancpain Endurance Series career
- Debut season: 2011
- Current team: Prospeed Competition
- Categorisation: FIA Gold (until 2018); FIA Silver (2019–)
- Car number: 75
- Former teams: Faster Racing by DB Motorspor
- Starts: 5
- Wins: 0
- Poles: 0
- Fastest laps: 0

Previous series
- 2011 2010 2009 2008–09 2007 2006 2003–06 2003–05 2002 2001–02 2001–02: Belcar; FIA GT1 World Championship; Dutch Supercar Challenge; FIA GT Championship; Formula Renault 3.5 Series; Formula Renault 2.0 NEC; Eurocup Formula Renault 2.0; Formula Renault Netherlands; Formula Ford Netherlands; Formula Ford Benelux; Formula Ford Belgium

Championship titles
- 2001–02: Formula Ford Belgium
24 Hours of Le Mans career
- Years: 2009 – 2011, 2015
- Teams: Luc Alphand Aventures; JMW Motorsport
- Best finish: 16th (2009)
- Class wins: 0

Xavier Maassen (born 22 June 1980 in Heerlen) is a Dutch racing driver who previously competed in the FIA GT1 World Championship for Mad-Croc Racing. Recently, he has participated in the Blancpain Endurance Series for Prospeed Competition. He lives in Lanaken in Belgium.

== Career ==
=== Single-seaters ===
==== Formula Ford ====
Maassen began his racing career with success in Formula Ford, winning the Belgian championship in 2001 and 2002. He also finished fifth in the Benelux series in 2001, and was runner-up to Jaap van Lagen in 2002. He also finished fifth in the Dutch series in 2002.

==== Formula Renault ====
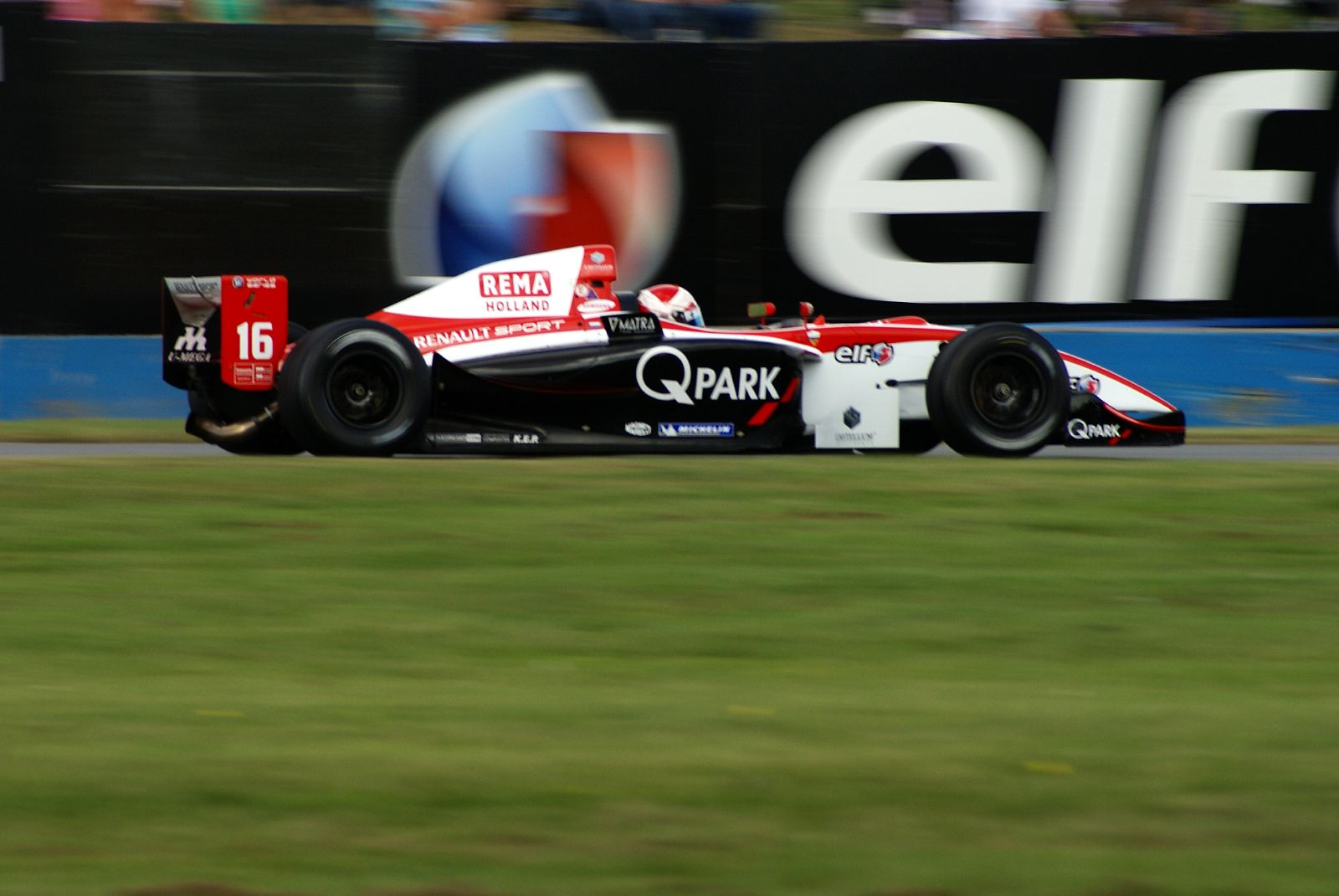
Maassen racing in the Formula Renault 3.5 Series in 2007.

Maassen stepped up to Formula Renault in 2003, finishing seventh in Formula Renault 2.0 Netherlands, before finishing runner-up to Junior Strous in 2004. Having competed in selected Eurocup Formula Renault 2.0 in the previous two seasons, Maassen moved to the series full-time in 2005, finishing tenth overall. In 2006, he combined another season in the Eurocup, where he finished 13th, with a season in the North European Championship, a merger of the Dutch and German national series. He finished third in the overall standings behind Filipe Albuquerque and Chris van der Drift.

Maassen stepped up to the Formula Renault 3.5 Series in 2007, but failed to score any points in 17 starts for Prema Powerteam.

=== GT racing ===
Maassen began racing in the FIA GT Championship in 2008 driving a Corvette C6.R for the Selleslagh Racing Team alongside Christophe Bouchut. He won just his second GT race at Monza, and the pair finished 13th in the driver's standings.

Maassen started the 2009 season driving a Corvette for Luc Alphand Aventures, but the team missed the races at Spa and Algarve, and so raced for another Corvette team, Sangari Team Brazil at those races. Maassen also raced for Luc Alphand Aventures at the 2009 24 Hours of Le Mans, finishing second in the GT1 category.

Maassen competed in the new FIA GT1 World Championship in 2010, returning to the DKR Engineering team, now under the Mad-Croc Racing banner.

== Racing record ==
=== Complete Eurocup Formula Renault 2.0 results ===
(key) (Races in bold indicate pole position; races in italics indicate fastest lap)

Year	Entrant	1	2	3	4	5	6	7	8	9	10	11	12	13	14	15	16	DC	Points
2005	JD Motorsport	ZOL; 1; 18	ZOL; 2; 10	VAL; 1; 8	VAL; 2 NC	LMS; 1; 14	LMS; 2; 10	BIL; 1; 12	BIL; 2; 15	OSC; 1; 15	OSC; 2; 10	DON; 1; 5	DON; 2 Ret	EST; 1; 9	EST; 2; 5	MNZ; 1; 3	MNZ; 2; 16	10th	32
2006	JD Motorsport	ZOL; 1; 26*	ZOL; 2; 3	IST; 1; 10	IST; 2; 19	MIS; 1 Ret	MIS; 2 Ret	NÜR; 1; 12	NÜR; 2; 9	DON; 1 Ret	DON; 2; 5	LMS; 1; 13	LMS; 2; 16	CAT; 1; 16	CAT; 2; 12			13th	21

=== Complete Formula Renault 2.0 NEC results ===
(key) (Races in bold indicate pole position) (Races in italics indicate fastest lap)

Year	Entrant	1	2	3	4	5	6	7	8	9	10	11	12	13	14	15	16	DC	Points
2006	JD Motorsport	OSC; 1; 2	OSC; 2; 3	SPA; 1; 18	SPA; 2; 1	NÜR; 1; 13	NÜR; 2; 5	ZAN; 1; 3	ZAN; 2; 2	**OSC**; **1**; 1	OSC; 2; 5	ASS; 1	ASS; 2	AND; 1; 5	AND; 2; 8	SAL; 1; 4	SAL; 2; 6	3rd	252

=== Complete Formula Renault 3.5 Series results ===
(key) (Races in bold indicate pole position) (Races in italics indicate fastest lap)

Year	Team	1	2	3	4	5	6	7	8	9	10	11	12	13	14	15	16	17	Pos	Points
2007	Prema Powerteam	MNZ; 1 Ret	MNZ; 2; 17	NÜR; 1; 22	NÜR; 2; 17	MON; 1; 17	HUN; 1; 14	HUN; 2; 13	SPA; 1; 14	SPA; 2 Ret	DON; 1 Ret	DON; 2; 14	MAG; 1 Ret	MAG; 2 Ret	EST; 1; 22	EST; 2 Ret	CAT; 1; 23	CAT; 2; 17	32nd	0

=== Complete GT1 World Championship results ===
Year	Team	Car	1	2	3	4	5	6	7	8	9	10	11	12	13	14	15	16	17	18	19	20	Pos	Points
2010	Mad-Croc Racing	Corvette C6.R	ABU; QR; 14	ABU; CR; 10	SIL; QR; 12	SIL; CR; 11	BRN; QR; 5	BRN; CR; 15	PRI; QR; 4	PRI; CR; 6	SPA; QR; 1	SPA; CR; Ret	NÜR; QR; 18	NÜR; CR; 18	ALG; QR; 7	ALG; CR; 14	NAV; QR	NAV; CR	INT; QR	INT; CR	SAN; QR	SAN; CR	31st	17

=== 24 Hours of Le Mans results ===
Year	Team	Co-Drivers	Car	Class	Laps	Pos.	Class Pos.
2009	(France) Luc Alphand Aventures	(France) Julien Jousse (France) Yann Clairay	Chevrolet Corvette C6.R	GT1	336	16th	**2nd**
2010	(France) Luc Alphand Aventures	(France) Julien Jousse (France) Patrice Goueslard	Chevrolet Corvette C6.R	GT1	238	DNF	DNF
2011	(United Kingdom) JMW Motorsport	(United Kingdom) Rob Bell (United Kingdom) Tim Sugden	Ferrari 458 Italia GTC	GTE; Pro	290	24th	9th
2015	(Taiwan) Team AAI	(Taiwan) Jun-San Chen (United Kingdom) Alex Kapadia	Porsche 911 GT3-RSR	GTE; Am	316	37th	8th
