= 2011 FIA GT1 Sachsenring round =

The Sachsenring

The 2011 FIA GT1 Sachsenring round is an auto racing event held at the Sachsenring, Saxony, Germany on 13–15 May, and will be the fourth round of the 2011 FIA GT1 World Championship season. It is the FIA GT1 World Championship's first race held at the 3.7 km (2.3 mi) Sachsenring, as the circuit replaces the Nürburgring as the German round for the series. The event will be supported by the German ADAC Masters Weekend, featuring the ADAC GT Masters, ATS Formel 3 Cup, ADAC Formel Masters, and ADAC Procar Series, as well as the German Mini Challenge.

== Background ==
Success Ballast
Entry	Ballast
No. 38 All-Inkl.com Münnich Motorsport	45 kg (99 lb)
No. 23 JR Motorsports	35 kg (77 lb)
No. 8 Young Driver AMR	20 kg (44 lb)
No. 21 Sumo Power GT	10 kg (22 lb)
No. 37 All-Inkl.com Münnich Motorsport	5 kg (11 lb)

Marc Basseng and Markus Winkelhock of Münnich Motorsport retained their championship lead following the Algarve round and further extended their advantage to twenty points over both Young Driver's Darren Turner and Stefan Mücke and Algarve Championship Race-winners Michael Krumm and Lucas Luhr of JR Motorsports. Basseng and Winkelhock's car also has lost five kilograms of the 50 kg (110 lb) of success ballast they carried at Algarve. Luhr and Krumm have gained 35 kg, while Turner and Mücke carry only 20 kg into Sachsenring. Luhr and Krumm also have the addition of 15 kg which have been added to the minimum weight for all Nissans as part of the FIA's balance of performance. The Ford GT teams have also had their minimum weights altered, losing 10 kg. In the Teams' Championship Hexis AMR has taken over the title lead, a single point ahead of both Münnich and JR Motorsports, while Young Driver is two points further behind in fourth.

With only a week between the Algarve and Sachsenring, the majority of teams have retained the line-ups. Frédéric Makowiecki returns to Marc VDS after being absent in the Algarve, while Yann Clairay moves from Marc VDS to Belgian Racing to replace Martin Matzke. Warren Hughes rejoins the Sumo Power GT team he drove for in 2010, replacing Ricardo Zonta in the team's No. 20 car, partnering Enrique Bernoldi. The sole DKR Engineering Corvette has withdrawn from the Sachsenring event due to a lack of spare parts after the team has suffered three accidents in past four races, reducing the field to seventeen cars.

== Qualifying ==
=== Qualifying result ===
For qualifying, Driver 1 participates in the first and third sessions while Driver 2 participates in only the second session. The fastest lap for each session is indicated with bold.

Pos	No.	Driver 1	Team	Session 1	Session 2	Session 3	Grid
Pos	No.	Driver 2	Team	Session 1	Session 2	Session 3	Grid
1	37	(Germany) Dominik Schwager	(Germany) All-Inkl.com Münnich Motorsport	1:19.941	1:19.308	1:18.763	1
1	37	(Netherlands) Nicky Pastorelli	(Germany) All-Inkl.com Münnich Motorsport	1:19.941	1:19.308	1:18.763	1
2	3	(Netherlands) Stef Dusseldorp	(France) Hexis AMR	1:19.337	1:19.449	1:19.028	2
2	3	(Monaco) Clivio Piccione	(France) Hexis AMR	1:19.337	1:19.449	1:19.028	2
3	8	(Germany) Stefan Mücke	(Germany) Young Driver AMR	1:19.591	1:19.119	1:19.471	3
3	8	(United Kingdom) Darren Turner	(Germany) Young Driver AMR	1:19.591	1:19.119	1:19.471	3
4	20	(United Kingdom) Warren Hughes	(United Kingdom) Sumo Power GT	1:19.657	1:19.503	1:19.605	4
4	20	(Brazil) Enrique Bernoldi	(United Kingdom) Sumo Power GT	1:19.657	1:19.503	1:19.605	4
5	22	(United Kingdom) Richard Westbrook	(United Kingdom) JR Motorsports	1:20.007	1:19.599	1:19.634	5
5	22	(United Kingdom) Peter Dumbreck	(United Kingdom) JR Motorsports	1:20.007	1:19.599	1:19.634	5
6	40	(Belgium) Bas Leinders	(Belgium) Marc VDS Racing Team	1:19.832	1:19.295	1:19.739	6
6	40	(Germany) Marc Hennerici	(Belgium) Marc VDS Racing Team	1:19.832	1:19.295	1:19.739	6
7	11	(Netherlands) Mike Hezemans	Exim Bank Team China	1:19.143	1:19.135	1:18.714^{1}	7
7	11	(Netherlands) Nick Catsburg	Exim Bank Team China	1:19.143	1:19.135	1:18.714^{1}	7
8	23	(Germany) Lucas Luhr	(United Kingdom) JR Motorsports	1:19.885	1:19.300	No Time	8
8	23	(Germany) Michael Krumm	(United Kingdom) JR Motorsports	1:19.885	1:19.300	No Time	8
9	5	(Austria) Karl Wendlinger	(Switzerland) Swiss Racing Team	1:19.859	1:19.605		17^{2}
9	5	(Netherlands) Peter Kox	(Switzerland) Swiss Racing Team	1:19.859	1:19.605		17^{2}
10	7	(Czech Republic) Tomáš Enge	(Germany) Young Driver AMR	1:19.522	1:19.652		9
10	7	(Germany) Alex Müller	(Germany) Young Driver AMR	1:19.522	1:19.652		9
11	21	(Australia) David Brabham	(United Kingdom) Sumo Power GT	1:19.598	1:19.820		10
11	21	(United Kingdom) Jamie Campbell-Walter	(United Kingdom) Sumo Power GT	1:19.598	1:19.820		10
12	10	(France) Yann Clairay	(Belgium) Belgian Racing	1:19.883	1:19.992		11
12	10	(France) Antoine Leclerc	(Belgium) Belgian Racing	1:19.883	1:19.992		11
13	4	(Germany) Christian Hohenadel	(France) Hexis AMR	1:19.229	1:20.075		16
13	4	(Italy) Andrea Piccini	(France) Hexis AMR	1:19.229	1:20.075		16
14	41	(Belgium) Maxime Martin	(Belgium) Marc VDS Racing Team	1:18.889	No Time		12
14	41	(France) Frédéric Makowiecki	(Belgium) Marc VDS Racing Team	1:18.889	No Time		12
15	38	(Germany) Markus Winkelhock	(Germany) All-Inkl.com Münnich Motorsport	1:20.015			13
15	38	(Germany) Marc Basseng	(Germany) All-Inkl.com Münnich Motorsport	1:20.015			13
16	9	(Belgium) Vanina Ickx	(Belgium) Belgian Racing	1:20.165			14
16	9	(Denmark) Christoffer Nygaard	(Belgium) Belgian Racing	1:20.165			14
17	6	(Sweden) Max Nilsson	(Switzerland) Swiss Racing Team	1:21.115			15
17	6	(Czech Republic) Jiří Janák	(Switzerland) Swiss Racing Team	1:21.115			15

1. The No. 11 Exim Bank Corvette had its Qualifying Session 3 times cancelled for stopping in the pit lane instead of returning to its garage during the session.
2. The No. 5 Swiss Racing Lamborghini was penalized ten grid spots for overtaking during a red flag period in the Qualifying sessions.

== Races ==
=== Qualifying Race ===
Following a penalty handed to the Corvette of Exim Bank Team China, the No. 37 Münnich Lamborghini of Nicky Pastorelli lead the field at the start, quickly getting a clear hold on first ahead of Clivio Piccione's Hexis Aston Martin. Entering Turn 1, Antoine Leclerc's Belgian Racing Ford tipped the Marc VDS Ford into a spin. Facing backwards, Marc Hennerici was then collected by the second Belgian car of Christoffer Nygaard. With both cars unable to get moving again, the safety car was dispatched for a full course caution to gather the field at the end of the first lap. The safety car was recalled at the start of Lap 4 and Pastorelli resumed his lead of the race. A lap later Nicky Catsburg in the Exim Corvette started to make a pass for seventh place on the JR Motorsports Nissan of Michael Krumm in the first sequence of corners, but spun into the gravel after getting ahead of Krumm exiting Turn 3, stranding the car in the gravel trap.

After the restarting the race in 12th place, Marc VDS's Frédéric Makowiecki began to make his way through the field, passing five cars on track in the next ten laps. As Makowiecki challenged Young Driver's Alex Müller for fifth place into Turn 3 the two made contact and Müller spun his car around, resuming at the back of the field, while Makowiecki continued to race on without being slowed by the incident. At the front of the field, Piccini closed on the rear of Pastorelli and began to challenge for the race lead, followed closely by Darren Turner in third. On Lap 18, the pit window opened and the top three all made their pit stops at the end of that lap. Hexis made the quickest pit stop of the three, allowing Stef Dusseldorp to exit the pits first, followed by Young Driver's Stefan Mücke. Münnich Motorsport suffered a problem with their tire challenge, slowing their pit stop and losing Dominik Schwager three positions as he returned to the track. Enrique Bernoldi briefly held the race lead for Sumo Power for one lap before making his pit stop, handing the lead to Makowiecki. Marc VDS brought the Ford into the pits as the last car to make a pit stop and Maxime Martin was able to exit in the race lead, but he was immediately challenged by Dusseldorp into Turn 1. After Martin defended the race lead he was able to pull away from Dusseldorp, while Warren Hughes had taken over third place after the completion of all pit stops.

With twenty minutes remaining in the race, Max Nilsson went wide in Turn 9 and hit the safety barriers, retiring on the spot. Yann Clairay of Belgian Racing attempted to challenge Markus Winkelhock for tenth place, but spun on his own in Turn 4 and fell to 12th. In the closing five minutes of the race, Mücke caught Hughes to challenge for third place and passed for the position. Further behind them, Christian Hohenadel and Schwager challenged Peter Dumbreck's Nissan for fifth position, but Schwager braked too late for Turn 1 while attempting to pass Dumbreck and went into the gravel trap, eventually falling to seventh. Hohenadel then took over the challenge to Dumbreck and successfully passed him on the final lap of the race. Martin cross the finish line 6.6 seconds ahead of Dusseldorp, followed by Hughes and Mücke, and finally Hohenadel and Dumbreck completed the final two positions for championship points.

==== Race result ====
Pos	No.	Team	Drivers	Manufacturer	Laps	Time/Retired
1	41	(Belgium) Marc VDS Racing Team	(Belgium) Maxime Martin (France) Frédéric Makowiecki	Ford	43	
2	3	(France) Hexis AMR	(Monaco) Clivio Piccione (Netherlands) Stef Dusseldorp	Aston Martin	43	−6.683
3	8	(Germany) Young Driver AMR	(United Kingdom) Darren Turner (Germany) Stefan Mücke	Aston Martin	43	−20.166
4	20	(United Kingdom) Sumo Power GT	(Brazil) Enrique Bernoldi (United Kingdom) Warren Hughes	Nissan	43	−24.041
5	4	(France) Hexis AMR	(Germany) Christian Hohenadel (Italy) Andrea Piccini	Aston Martin	43	−33.083
6	22	(United Kingdom) JR Motorsport	(United Kingdom) Peter Dumbreck (United Kingdom) Richard Westbrook	Nissan	43	−34.907
7	37	(Germany) All-Inkl.com Münnich Motorsport	(Netherlands) Nicky Pastorelli (Germany) Dominik Schwager	Lamborghini	43	−38.325
8	21	(United Kingdom) Sumo Power GT	(Australia) David Brabham (United Kingdom) Jamie Campbell-Walter	Nissan	43	−39.884
9	38	(Germany) All-Inkl.com Münnich Motorsport	(Germany) Marc Basseng (Germany) Markus Winkelhock	Lamborghini	43	−39.884
10	7	(Germany) Young Driver AMR	(Czech Republic) Tomáš Enge (Germany) Alex Müller	Aston Martin	43	−40.376
11	23	(United Kingdom) JR Motorsport	(Germany) Michael Krumm (Germany) Lucas Luhr	Nissan	43	−48.863
12	5	(Switzerland) Swiss Racing Team	(Austria) Karl Wendlinger (Netherlands) Peter Kox	Lamborghini	43	−48.991
13	10	(Belgium) Belgian Racing	(France) Yann Clairay (France) Antoine Leclerc	Ford	43	−51.058
14 DNF	6	(Switzerland) Swiss Racing Team	(Sweden) Max Nilsson (Czech Republic) Jiří Janák	Lamborghini	25	Accident
15 DNF	11	Exim Bank Team China	(Netherlands) Mike Hezemans (Netherlands) Nick Catsburg	Corvette	4	Spun
16 DNF	9	(Belgium) Belgian Racing	(Belgium) Vanina Ickx (Denmark) Christoffer Nygaard	Ford	0	Collision
17 DNF	40	(Belgium) Marc VDS Racing Team	(Belgium) Bas Leinders (Germany) Marc Hennerici	Ford	0	Collision

=== Championship Race ===
==== Race result ====
Pos	No.	Team	Drivers	Manufacturer	Laps	Time/Retired
1	4	(France) Hexis AMR	(Germany) Christian Hohenadel (Italy) Andrea Piccini	Aston Martin	42	
2	37	(Germany) All-Inkl.com Münnich Motorsport	(Netherlands) Nicky Pastorelli (Germany) Dominik Schwager	Lamborghini	42	−2.523
3	8	(Germany) Young Driver AMR	(United Kingdom) Darren Turner (Germany) Stefan Mücke	Aston Martin	42	−4.218
4	20	(United Kingdom) Sumo Power GT	(Brazil) Enrique Bernoldi (United Kingdom) Warren Hughes	Nissan	42	−22.861
5	21	(United Kingdom) Sumo Power GT	(Australia) David Brabham (United Kingdom) Jamie Campbell-Walter	Nissan	42	−23.547
6	11	Exim Bank Team China	(Netherlands) Mike Hezemans (Netherlands) Nick Catsburg	Corvette	42	−23.867
7	22	(United Kingdom) JR Motorsport	(United Kingdom) Peter Dumbreck (United Kingdom) Richard Westbrook	Nissan	42	−24.287
8	40	(Belgium) Marc VDS Racing Team	(Belgium) Bas Leinders (Germany) Marc Hennerici	Ford	42	−25.272
9	23	(United Kingdom) JR Motorsport	(Germany) Michael Krumm (Germany) Lucas Luhr	Nissan	42	−26.477
10	10	(Belgium) Belgian Racing	(France) Yann Clairay (France) Antoine Leclerc	Ford	42	−29.419
11	3	(France) Hexis AMR	(Monaco) Clivio Piccione (Netherlands) Stef Dusseldorp	Aston Martin	42	−55.554
12 DNF	38	(Germany) All-Inkl.com Münnich Motorsport	(Germany) Marc Basseng (Germany) Markus Winkelhock	Lamborghini	19	Puncture
13 DNF	41	(Belgium) Marc VDS Racing Team	(Belgium) Maxime Martin (France) Yann Clairay	Ford	9	Puncture
14 DNF	9	(Belgium) Belgian Racing	(Belgium) Vanina Ickx (Denmark) Christoffer Nygaard	Ford	2	Damage
15 DNF	5	(Switzerland) Swiss Racing Team	(Austria) Karl Wendlinger (Netherlands) Peter Kox	Lamborghini	0	Collision
16 DNF	7	(Germany) Young Driver AMR	(Czech Republic) Tomáš Enge (Germany) Alex Müller	Aston Martin	0	Collision
17 DNF	6	(Switzerland) Swiss Racing Team	(Sweden) Max Nilsson (Czech Republic) Jiří Janák	Lamborghini	0	Collision

FIA GT1 World Championship
Previous race: Algarve	2011 season	Next race: RAC Tourist Trophy
