= Max Nilsson =

Swedish racing driver (born 1980)

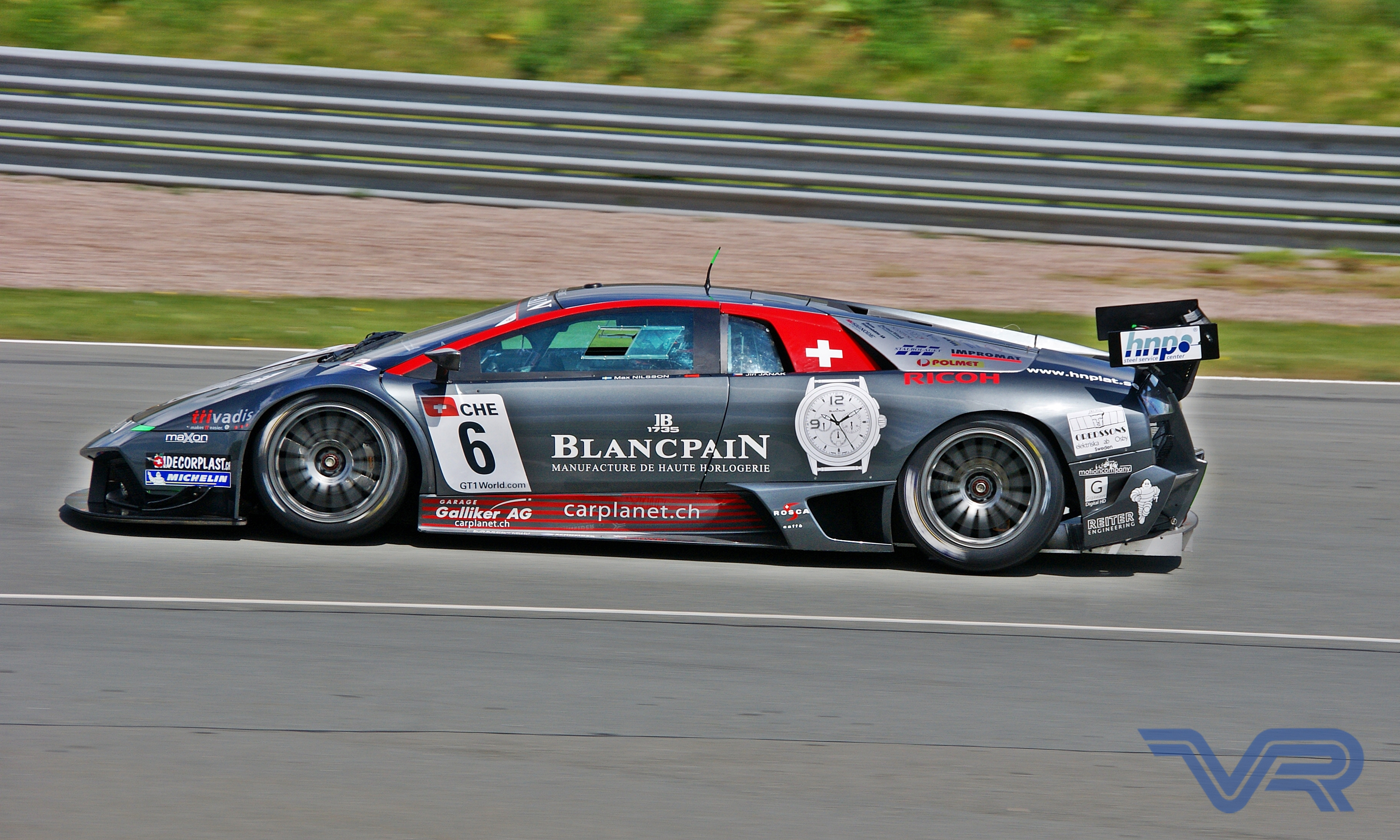
- Nilsson in 2011
- Nationality: (Sweden) Swedish
- Born: Max Emil Nilsson; February 10, 1980 (age 46) Osby, Sweden

FIA GT3 European Championship career
- Categorisation: FIA Silver
- Years active: 2011–2012
- Teams: Reiter Engineering; Heico Gravity-Charouz Team
- Starts: 14
- Wins: 1
- Podiums: 3
- Poles: 0
- Fastest laps: 0
- Best finish: 6th in 2012

Previous series
- 2010–2011 2009 2006–2009: FIA GT1 World Championship; FIA GT Championship; German Formula Three Championship

Max Emil Nilsson (born 10 February 1980) is a Swedish racing driver.

A mainstay of the Swiss Racing Team, Nilsson competed for SRT in four German F3 seasons before turning professional in 2010, racing a Nissan GT-R in the FIA GT1 World Championship. He placed 42nd with two points, scored at Silverstone alongside former Le Mans winner Seiji Ara. He achieved more success in the FIA GT3 European Championship, winning once at Navarra and helping Heico Gravity-Charouz to the 2012 title.

== Racing record ==
=== Career summary ===
Season	Series	Team	Races	Wins	Poles	F/Laps	Podiums	Points	Position
2000	Formula Ford Sweden – Zetec	AB Heintz Nilsson Plåtbearbetning	16	0	0	?	0	22	12th
2001	Formula Ford Sweden – Zetec	H Nilssons Plåtbearbetning	16	0	0	?	0	31	11th
2002	Formula Ford Sweden – Zetec	AB Heintz Nilsson Plåtbearbetning	12	0	0	?	1	56	9th
2002	Formula Ford Nordic – Zetec		2	0	0	?	0	9	14th
2003	Formula Ford Sweden – Zetec	HNP Steelservice Center	?	?	?	?	?	92	**3rd**
2003	Formula Ford Denmark		?	?	?	?	?	132	6th
2004	Formula Renault 2000 Scandinavia	HNP Steelservice	16	0	0	?	2	97	7th
2004	Formula Renault 2000 Germany	Max Racing	6	0	0	0	0	23	27th
2004	Formula Renault 2000 Netherlands		?	0	0	0	0	14	22nd
2005	Formula Renault 2000 Germany	Max Racing	14	0	0	0	0	125	14th
2005	Formula Renault 2000 Netherlands	Max Racing	2	0	0	0	0	6	30th
2006	German Formula 3 Championship	Swiss Racing Team	12	0	0	0	0	0	NC
2006	Masters of Formula 3	Swiss Racing Team	1	0	0	0	0	N/A	33rd
2007	German Formula 3 Championship	Swiss Racing Team	16	0	0	0	0	15	8th
2008	German Formula 3 Championship	Swiss Racing Team	17	0	0	0	0	20	10th
2009	German Formula 3 Championship	Swiss Racing Team	18	0	0	0	1	30	10th
2009	FIA GT Championship	K plus K Motorsport	1	0	0	0	0	1	25th
2010	FIA GT1 World Championship	Swiss Racing Team	20	0	0	0	0	2	42nd
2010	Belgian Touring Car Series – S1	KS Motorsport	1	0	?	?	0	6.5	33rd
2011	FIA GT1 World Championship	Swiss Racing Team	7	0	0	0	0	0	36th
2011	FIA GT3 European Championship	Reiter Engineering	2	0	0	0	0	0	48th
2012	24 Hours of Dubai – A6	Heico Motorsport	1	0	0	0	1	N/A	**2nd**
2012	FIA GT3 European Championship	Heico Gravity-Charouz Team	12	1	0	0	3	111	6th

=== Complete FIA GT Championship results ===
(key) (Races in bold indicate pole position) (Races in italics indicate fastest lap)

Year	Team	Car	Class	1	2	3	4	5	6	7	8	Pos.	Pts
2009	K plus K Motorsport	Saleen S7-R	GT1	SIL	ADR	OSC	SPA	HUN; 8	ALG	LEC	ZOL	25th	1

=== Complete FIA GT1 World Championship results ===
(key) (Races in bold indicate pole position) (Races in italics indicate fastest lap)

Year	Team	Car	1	2	3	4	5	6	7	8	9	10	11	12	13	14	15	16	17	18	19	20	Pos	Points
2010	Swiss Racing Team	Nissan	ABU; QR; 12	ABU; CR; Ret	SIL; QR; 14	SIL; CR; 9	BRN; QR; 15	BRN; CR; 14	PRI; QR; 12	PRI; CR; Ret	SPA; QR; 17	SPA; CR; 16	NÜR; QR; 17	NÜR; CR; 21	ALG; QR; 11	ALG; CR; 18	NAV; QR; 13	NAV; CR; Ret	INT; QR; 13	INT; CR; 16	SAN; QR; Ret	SAN; CR; 13	42nd	2
2011	Swiss Racing Team	Lamborghini	ABU; QR; 13	ABU; CR; Ret	ZOL; QR; 8	ZOL; CR; DNS	ALG; QR; 12	ALG; CR; Ret	SAC; QR; Ret	SAC; CR; Ret	SIL; QR	SIL; CR	NAV; QR	NAV; CR	PRI; QR	PRI; CR	ORD; QR	ORD; CR	BEI; QR	BEI; CR	SAN; QR	SAN; CR	36th	0

=== Complete FIA GT3 European Championship results ===
(key) (Races in bold indicate pole position; races in italics indicate fastest lap)

Year	Entrant	Chassis	Engine	1	2	3	4	5	6	7	8	9	10	11	12	Pos.	Points
2011	Reiter Engineering	Lamborghini Gallardo LP600+	Lamborghini 5.2 L V10	ALG; 1	ALG; 2	SIL; 1	SIL; 2	NAV; 1	NAV; 2	LEC; 1	LEC; 2	SLO; 1	SLO; 2	ZAN; 1 Ret	ZAN; 2; 15	48th	0
2012	Heico Gravity-Charouz Team	Mercedes-Benz SLS AMG GT3	Mercedes-Benz M159 6.2 L V8	NOG; 1; 6	NOG; 2; 5	ZOL; 1; 4	ZOL; 2; 9	NAV; 1; 1	NAV; 2; 5	ALG; 1; 2	ALG; 2; 10	MOS; 1 Ret	MOS; 2; 7	NÜR; 1; 3	NÜR; 2; 8	6th	111
