= 2011 FIA GT1 Algarve round =

The Autódromo Internacional do Algarve

The 2011 FIA GT1 Algarve round is an auto racing event held at the Autódromo Internacional do Algarve in Portimão, Portugal on 6–8 May 2011. The event is the third round of the 2011 FIA GT1 World Championship season. FIA GT1 previously visited the Algarve circuit in autumn 2010, with drivers Peter Dumbreck and Michael Krumm of Sumo Power Nissan winning the Qualifying Race, and Michael Bartels and Andrea Bertolini of Vitaphone Maserati winning the Championship Race. The event is supported by the FIA GT3 European Championship, the Mini Challenge, and local Portuguese racing series.

The race weekend was swept by Nissan, whose teams won pole position and both races. JR Motorsports' Richard Westbrook and Peter Dumbreck won pole on qualifying, while the rest of Nissan locked out the front two rows of the grid. In the Qualifying Race Westbrook and Dumbreck won by less than a second over teammates Michael Krumm and Lucas Luhr, and Sumo Power's David Brabham and Jamie Campbell-Walter earned Nissan a podium sweep. In the Championship Race, Westbrook and Dumbreck's car suffered gearbox failure, allowing Krumm and Luhr to take the race victory, ahead of Darren Turner and Stefan Mücke for Young Driver Aston Martin, and Brabham and Campbell-Walter once again finishing third.

== Background ==
Success Ballast
Entry	Ballast
No. 38 All-Inkl.com Münnich Motorsport	50 kg (110 lb)
No. 3 Hexis AMR	25 kg (55 lb)
No. 4 Hexis AMR	10 kg (22 lb)
No. 7 Young Driver AMR	10 kg (22 lb)
No. 5 Swiss Racing Team	5 kg (11 lb)
No. 11 Exim Bank Team China	5 kg (11 lb)

Following the sweep of both races in the second round at Zolder, Markus Winkelhock and Marc Basseng come to the Algarve as the Drivers' Championship leaders, thirteen points clear of Abu Dhabi winners Clivio Piccione and Stef Dusseldorp, and a further six points ahead of the other Hexis AMR drivers Christian Hohenadel and Andrea Piccini. Winkelhock and Basseng's success has however hampered their car with 50 kg (110 lb) of success ballast, while Piccione and Dusseldorp have lost 5 kg (11 lb) from what they carried at Zolder. In the Teams' Championship, Münnich Lamborghini has a 19-point lead over Hexis Aston Martin. The second Aston Martin squad of Young Driver AMR is three points behind Hexis.

Following scheduling conflicts for several drivers involved other racing series, three teams have made changes to their line-ups for this round. DKR Engineering has replaced Jaime Camara with experienced GT1 driver Matteo Bobbi, who drove for both Hegersport and Marc VDS in 2010, while Frédéric Makowiecki is replaced by former Hexis driver Yann Clairay at Marc VDS. Belgian Racing has made changes to the line-ups of both of their cars; Christoffer Nygaard joins the team after campaigning for Young Driver in 2010 to partner Vanina Ickx in the Mo. 9 Ford, while Antoine Leclerc, who drove for the team in Abu Dhabi earlier this season, moves to the No. 10 car to partner Martin Matzke.

== Qualifying ==
=== Qualifying result ===
For qualifying, Driver 1 participates in the first and third sessions while Driver 2 participates in only the second session. The fastest lap for each session is indicated with bold.

Pos	No.	Driver 1	Team	Session 1	Session 2	Session 3	Grid
Pos	No.	Driver 2	Team	Session 1	Session 2	Session 3	Grid
1	22	(United Kingdom) Richard Westbrook	(United Kingdom) JR Motorsports	1:43.088	1:42.399	1:42.427	1
1	22	(United Kingdom) Peter Dumbreck	(United Kingdom) JR Motorsports	1:43.088	1:42.399	1:42.427	1
2	20	(Brazil) Enrique Bernoldi	(United Kingdom) Sumo Power GT	1:43.001	1:43.256	1:42.517	2
2	20	(Brazil) Ricardo Zonta	(United Kingdom) Sumo Power GT	1:43.001	1:43.256	1:42.517	2
3	23	(Germany) Lucas Luhr	(United Kingdom) JR Motorsports	1:42.990	1:41.959	1:42.574	3
3	23	(Germany) Michael Krumm	(United Kingdom) JR Motorsports	1:42.990	1:41.959	1:42.574	3
4	21	(United Kingdom) Jamie Campbell-Walter	(United Kingdom) Sumo Power GT	1:43.111	1:42.845	1:43.061	4
4	21	(Australia) David Brabham	(United Kingdom) Sumo Power GT	1:43.111	1:42.845	1:43.061	4
5	5	(Austria) Karl Wendlinger	(Switzerland) Swiss Racing Team	1:43.789	1:43.288	1:43.733	5
5	5	(Netherlands) Peter Kox	(Switzerland) Swiss Racing Team	1:43.789	1:43.288	1:43.733	5
6	3	(Monaco) Clivio Piccione	(France) Hexis AMR	1:43.604	1:43.265	1:44.157	6
6	3	(Netherlands) Stef Dusseldorp	(France) Hexis AMR	1:43.604	1:43.265	1:44.157	6
7	41	(France) Yann Clairay	(Belgium) Marc VDS Racing Team	1:44.081	1:43.147	No Time	7
7	41	(Belgium) Maxime Martin	(Belgium) Marc VDS Racing Team	1:44.081	1:43.147	No Time	7
8	8	(Germany) Stefan Mücke	(Germany) Young Driver AMR	1:42.966	1:42.248	1:42.726^{1}	13^{2}
8	8	(United Kingdom) Darren Turner	(Germany) Young Driver AMR	1:42.966	1:42.248	1:42.726^{1}	13^{2}
9	7	(Czech Republic) Tomáš Enge	(Germany) Young Driver AMR	1:43.958	1:43.534		8
9	7	(Germany) Alex Müller	(Germany) Young Driver AMR	1:43.958	1:43.534		8
10	40	(Germany) Marc Hennerici	(Belgium) Marc VDS Racing Team	1:43.908	1:43.579		9
10	40	(Belgium) Bas Leinders	(Belgium) Marc VDS Racing Team	1:43.908	1:43.579		9
11	7	(Germany) Christian Hohenadel	(France) Hexis AMR	1:43.837	1:43.646		10
11	7	(Italy) Andrea Piccini	(France) Hexis AMR	1:43.837	1:43.646		10
12	11	(Netherlands) Mike Hezemans	Exim Bank Team China	1:44.042	1:43.727		11
12	11	(Netherlands) Nick Catsburg	Exim Bank Team China	1:44.042	1:43.727		11
13	38	(Germany) Markus Winkelhock	(Germany) All-Inkl.com Münnich Motorsport	1:42.832	1:43.795		12
13	38	(Germany) Marc Basseng	(Germany) All-Inkl.com Münnich Motorsport	1:42.832	1:43.795		12
14	6	(Sweden) Max Nilsson	(Switzerland) Swiss Racing Team	1:43.988	1:43.966		14
14	6	(Czech Republic) Jiří Janák	(Switzerland) Swiss Racing Team	1:43.988	1:43.966		14
15	47	(Italy) Matteo Bobbi	(Luxembourg) DKR Engineering	1:44.182			15
15	47	(France) Michaël Rossi	(Luxembourg) DKR Engineering	1:44.182			15
16	9	(Denmark) Christoffer Nygaard	(Belgium) Belgian Racing	1:44.650			16
16	9	(Belgium) Vanina Ickx	(Belgium) Belgian Racing	1:44.650			16
17	10	(Czech Republic) Martin Matzke	(Belgium) Belgian Racing	1:45.359			17
17	10	(France) Antoine Leclerc	(Belgium) Belgian Racing	1:45.359			17
–	37	(Netherlands) Nicky Pastorelli	(Germany) All-Inkl.com Münnich Motorsport	No Time			18
–	37	(Germany) Dominik Schwager	(Germany) All-Inkl.com Münnich Motorsport	No Time			18

1. The No. 8 Young Driver Aston Martin's Session 3 times were cancelled after Stefan Mücke returned to the team's pit stall at the end of the session instead of entering parc fermé. Their qualifying position was demoted to eighth.
2. The No. 8 Young Driver Aston Martin received a five grid place penalty for changing an engine during the event.

== Races ==
=== Qualifying Race ===
The quartet of Nissans which had locked out the front two rows led away from the rolling start, with pole sitter Peter Dumbreck entering the first corner in the lead. The No. 5 Swiss Lamborghini of Peter Kox was able to get amongst the Nissans, but made contact with the No. 20 Sumo Power Nissan of Ricardo Zonta, spinning Zonta to a stop on the inside of the corner. Entering the fourth turn, Kox's Lamborghini was then spun by Alex Müller's Young Driver Aston Martin and collecting the Hexis Aston Martin of Clivio Piccione. Müller's car suffered suspension failure and retired after being vaulted into the air by the Lamborghini, while the rest of the field following behind was forced to use runoff and gravel areas on the outside of the turn to avoid the three spun cars. Following the first lap melee, Dumbreck held his lead over teammate Michael Krumm, and Sumo Power's David Brabham maintained third. Stefan Mücke used the incidents to his advantage to move from thirteenth to sixth, while Dominik Schwager was elevated to seventh position after starting last.

At the opening of the pit window Dumbreck's lead was nearly a second over Krumm, while Mücke, Schwager, and Yann Clairay had all managed to pass the Exim Bank Corvette of Nick Catsburg to take fourth, fifth, and sixth places respectively. After the leading pair made their individual stops on consecutive laps, Lucas Luhr was able to take over the race lead from his teammate Richard Westbrook, but two laps later Westbrook passed Luhr down the inside into Turn 1. Westbrook and Luhr maintained their positions within a second of each other to the end of the race, while Jamie Campbell-Walter secured a Nissan sweep of the podium by holding third place fifteen seconds behind the leaders.

==== Race result ====
Pos	No.	Team	Drivers	Manufacturer	Laps	Time/Retired
1	22	(United Kingdom) JR Motorsport	(United Kingdom) Peter Dumbreck (United Kingdom) Richard Westbrook	Nissan	34	
2	23	(United Kingdom) JR Motorsport	(Germany) Michael Krumm (Germany) Lucas Luhr	Nissan	34	−0.388
3	21	(United Kingdom) Sumo Power GT	(Australia) David Brabham (United Kingdom) Jamie Campbell-Walter	Nissan	34	−11.239
4	8	(Germany) Young Driver AMR	(United Kingdom) Darren Turner (Germany) Stefan Mücke	Aston Martin	34	−16.218
5	37	(Germany) All-Inkl.com Münnich Motorsport	(Netherlands) Nicky Pastorelli (Germany) Dominik Schwager	Lamborghini	34	−25.994
6	41	(Belgium) Marc VDS Racing Team	(Belgium) Maxime Martin (France) Yann Clairay	Ford	34	−32.599
7	38	(Germany) All-Inkl.com Münnich Motorsport	(Germany) Marc Basseng (Germany) Markus Winkelhock	Lamborghini	34	−39.688
8	20	(United Kingdom) Sumo Power GT	(Brazil) Enrique Bernoldi (Brazil) Ricardo Zonta	Nissan	34	−40.999
9	11	Exim Bank Team China	(Netherlands) Mike Hezemans (Netherlands) Nick Catsburg	Corvette	34	−45.470
10	5	(Switzerland) Swiss Racing Team	(Austria) Karl Wendlinger (Netherlands) Peter Kox	Lamborghini	34	−1:00.389
11	4	(France) Hexis AMR	(Germany) Christian Hohenadel (Italy) Andrea Piccini	Aston Martin	34	−1:01.718
12	6	(Switzerland) Swiss Racing Team	(Sweden) Max Nilsson (Czech Republic) Jiří Janák	Lamborghini	34	−1:10.533
13	3	(France) Hexis AMR	(Monaco) Clivio Piccione (Netherlands) Stef Dusseldorp	Aston Martin	34	−1:14.432
14	9	(Belgium) Belgian Racing	(Belgium) Vanina Ickx (Denmark) Christoffer Nygaard	Ford	34	−1:20.638
15	47	(Luxembourg) DKR Engineering	(France) Michaël Rossi (Italy) Matteo Bobbi	Corvette	34	−1:33.815
16	10	(Belgium) Belgian Racing	(Czech Republic) Martin Matzke (France) Antoine Leclerc	Ford	33	−1 Lap
17 DNF	40	(Belgium) Marc VDS Racing Team	(Belgium) Bas Leinders (Germany) Marc Hennerici	Ford	20	Puncture
18 DNF	7	(Germany) Young Driver AMR	(Czech Republic) Tomáš Enge (Germany) Alex Müller	Aston Martin	0	Collision

=== Championship Race ===
==== Race result ====
Pos	No.	Team	Drivers	Manufacturer	Laps	Time/Retired
1	23	(United Kingdom) JR Motorsport	(Germany) Michael Krumm (Germany) Lucas Luhr	Nissan	34	
2	8	(Germany) Young Driver AMR	(United Kingdom) Darren Turner (Germany) Stefan Mücke	Aston Martin	34	−5.497
3	21	(United Kingdom) Sumo Power GT	(Australia) David Brabham (United Kingdom) Jamie Campbell-Walter	Nissan	34	−6.273
4	37	(Germany) All-Inkl.com Münnich Motorsport	(Netherlands) Nicky Pastorelli (Germany) Dominik Schwager	Lamborghini	34	−8.095
5	5	(Switzerland) Swiss Racing Team	(Austria) Karl Wendlinger (Netherlands) Peter Kox	Lamborghini	34	−19.651
6	38	(Germany) All-Inkl.com Münnich Motorsport	(Germany) Marc Basseng (Germany) Markus Winkelhock	Lamborghini	34	−28.713
7	20	(United Kingdom) Sumo Power GT	(Brazil) Enrique Bernoldi (Brazil) Ricardo Zonta	Nissan	34	−29.045
8	4	(France) Hexis AMR	(Germany) Christian Hohenadel (Italy) Andrea Piccini	Aston Martin	34	−31.111
9	11	Exim Bank Team China	(Netherlands) Mike Hezemans (Netherlands) Nick Catsburg	Corvette	34	−31.929
10	40	(Belgium) Marc VDS Racing Team	(Belgium) Bas Leinders (Germany) Marc Hennerici	Ford	34	−55.248
11	9	(Belgium) Belgian Racing	(Belgium) Vanina Ickx (Denmark) Christoffer Nygaard	Ford	34	−1:34.717
12	22	(United Kingdom) JR Motorsport	(United Kingdom) Peter Dumbreck (United Kingdom) Richard Westbrook	Nissan	26	−8 Laps
13 DNF	7	(Germany) Young Driver AMR	(Czech Republic) Tomáš Enge (Germany) Alex Müller	Aston Martin	20	Alternator
14 DNF	47	(Luxembourg) DKR Engineering	(France) Michaël Rossi (Italy) Matteo Bobbi	Corvette	6	Gearbox
15 DNF	41	(Belgium) Marc VDS Racing Team	(Belgium) Maxime Martin (France) Yann Clairay	Ford	3	Transmission
16 DNF	6	(Switzerland) Swiss Racing Team	(Sweden) Max Nilsson (Czech Republic) Jiří Janák	Lamborghini	2	Gearbox
17 DNF	10	(Belgium) Belgian Racing	(Czech Republic) Martin Matzke (France) Antoine Leclerc	Ford	1	Damage
18 DNF	3	(France) Hexis AMR	(Monaco) Clivio Piccione (Netherlands) Stef Dusseldorp	Aston Martin	0	Transmission

FIA GT1 World Championship
Previous race: Zolder	2011 season	Next race: Sachsenring
