= Jiří Janák =

Czech racing driver

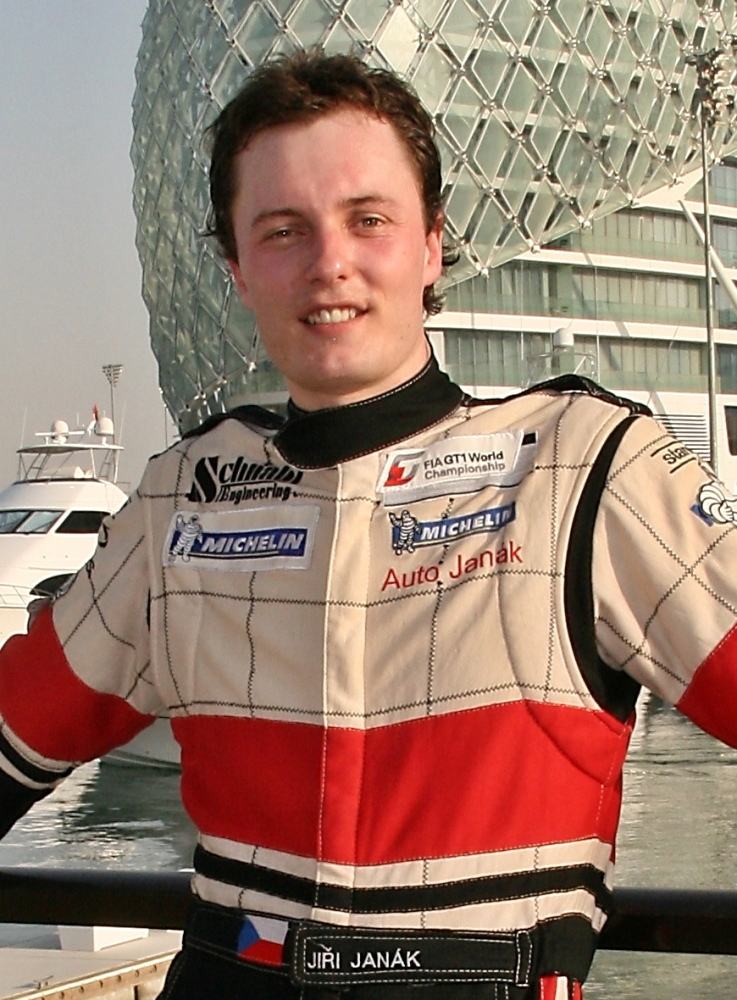
Jiří Janák - FIA GT1 2011, GP Abu Dhabi, Swiss Racing Team

Jiří Janák (born August 1, 1983 in Olomouc) is a Czech former auto racing driver.

== Career ==
Janák began competing in the Czech Skoda Octavia Cup in 2003. He progressed to win the series in 2005 and 2006.

In 2005, Janák competed in selected rounds of the Megane Trophy Eurocup. In 2006, he competed in the first round of the World Touring Car Championship for Československý Motorsport. He also competed in the Porsche Carrera Cup Germany in 2006.

In 2007, Janák began competing in the Porsche Supercup alongside his Carrera Cup Germany campaign, and currently competes in both series.

== Racing record ==
=== Complete World Touring Car Championship results ===
(key) (Races in bold indicate pole position) (Races in italics indicate fastest lap)

Year	Team	Car	1	2	3	4	5	6	7	8	9	10	11	12	13	14	15	16	17	18	19	20	DC	Points
2006	Československý Motorsport	Alfa Romeo 156 Gta	ITA; 1; 21	ITA; 2; 18	FRA; 1	FRA; 2	GBR; 1	GBR; 2	GER; 1	GER; 2	BRA; 1	BRA; 2	MEX; 1	MEX; 2	CZE; 1	CZE; 2	TUR; 1	TUR; 2	ESP; 1	ESP; 2	MAC; 1	MAC; 2	NC	0

=== Complete Porsche Supercup results ===
(key) (Races in bold indicate pole position – 2 points awarded 2008 onwards in all races) (Races in italics indicate fastest lap)

Year	Team	Car	1	2	3	4	5	6	7	8	9	10	11	12	13	DC	Points
2007	Schnabl Engineering	Porsche 997 GT3	BHR; Ret	BHR; 14	ESP; Ret	MON; Ret	FRA; Ret	GBR; Ret	GER; 14	HUN; 5	TUR; 20	ITA; 13	BEL; 11			18th	30
2008	Schnabl Engineering	Porsche 997 GT3	BHR; 9	BHR; DNS	ESP; 14	TUR; 12	MON; 13	FRA; Ret	GBR; Ret	GER; 11	HUN					18th	36
2008	Konrad Motorsport	Porsche 997 GT3										ESP; 13	BEL; 8	ITA		18th	36
2009	Konrad Motorsport	Porsche 997 GT3	BHR; Ret	BHR; 11	ESP; 9	MON; 10	TUR; 3	GBR; 7	GER; 10	HUN; 8	ESP; Ret	BEL; 10	ITA; 8	UAE	UAE	10th	77

=== Complete FIA GT Championship results ===
Year	Team	Class	SIL (United Kingdom)	MON (Italy)	ADR (Italy)	OSC (Germany)	SPA (Belgium)			BUC (Romania)		BRN (Czech Republic)	NOG (France)	ZOL (Belgium)	SAN (Argentina)	Total points
Year	Team	Class	SIL (United Kingdom)	MON (Italy)	ADR (Italy)	OSC (Germany)	6H	12H	24H	R1	R2	BRN (Czech Republic)	NOG (France)	ZOL (Belgium)	SAN (Argentina)	Total points
2008	Jetalliance Racing	GT1	-	-	-	-	-	-	-	-	-	-	DNS	-	-	**0**
2008	K plus K Motorsport	GT2	-	-	-	-	-	-	-	-	-	2	-	-	-	**8**

=== Complete GT1 World Championship results ===
Year	Team	Car	1	2	3	4	5	6	7	8	9	10	11	12	13	14	15	16	17	18	19	20	Pos	Points
2011	Swiss Racing Team	Lamborghini	ABU; QR; 13	ABU; CR; Ret	ZOL; QR; 8	ZOL; CR; DNS	ALG; QR; 12	ALG; CR; Ret	SAC; QR; Ret	SAC; CR; Ret	SIL; QR	SIL; CR	NAV; QR	NAV; CR	PRI; QR	PRI; CR	ORD; QR	ORD; CR	BEI; QR	BEI; CR	SAN; QR	SAN; CR	36th	0
