= Ballast =

Material that is used to provide stability to a vehicle or structure

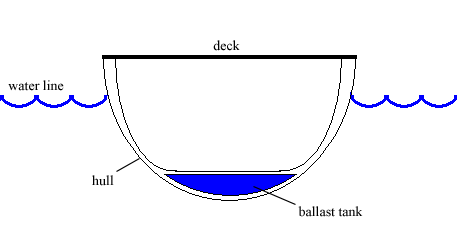
Cross section of a vessel with a single ballast tank at the bottom

Ballast is dense material used as a weight to provide stability to a vehicle or structure. Ballast, other than cargo, may be placed in a vehicle, often a ship or the gondola of a balloon or airship, to provide stability. A compartment within a boat, ship, submarine, or other floating structure that holds water is called a ballast tank. Water can be moved in and out from the ballast tank to balance the ship. In a vessel that travels on the water, the ballast will be kept below the water level, to counteract the effects of weight above the water level. The ballast may be redistributed in the vessel or disposed of altogether to change its effects on the movement of the vessel.

== History ==
The basic concept behind the ballast tank can be seen in many forms of aquatic life, such as the blowfish or members of the argonaut group of octopus. The concept has been invented and reinvented many times by humans to serve a variety of purposes.

In the fifteenth and sixteenth century, the ballast "did not consist entirely of leakage, but of urine, vomit, and various foul food leavings that lazy sailors discharged into the ballast contrary to orders, in the belief that the pumps would take care of it." In the eighteenth and nineteenth century, cargo boats returning from Europe to North America would carry quarried stone as ballast, contributing to the architectural heritage of some east coast cities (for example Montreal), where this stone was used in building. Stone ballast was also responsible for introducing hundreds of new plant species to North America.

During World War 2 ships returning from Great Britain to the United States used rubble as ballast. The ballast would be dumped in New York and used for construction projects such as FDR Drive and an outcrop colloquially named Bristol Basin since it was made from rubble from bombed-out Bristol.

== Uses ==
One of the functions of a yacht's keel is to provide ballast.

Ballast takes many forms, for example:

- Sailing ballast, or ship's ballast, used to lower the centre of gravity of a ship to increase stability
  - Ballast tank, a device used on ships and submarines and other submersibles to control buoyancy and stability
- Ballast (car racing), metallic plates used to bring auto racing vehicles up to the minimum mandated weight
- in underwater diving, a diver weighting system comprises blocks of heavy material, usually lead, used to compensate for excess buoyancy of the diver and their equipment.
- in gliding, weights added to maximise the average speed in cross-country competition, especially when thermal convection is strong
- in a balloon, as part of a buoyancy compensator

Sailing ballast is used in sailboats to provide righting moment to resist the overturning moment generated by lateral forces on the sail. Insufficiently ballasted boats will tend to tip, or heel, excessively in high winds. Too much heel may result in the boat capsizing. If a sailing vessel should need to voyage without cargo then ballast of little or no value would be loaded to keep the vessel upright. Some or all of this ballast would then be discarded when cargo was loaded.

Ballast weight is also added to a race car to alter its performance. In most racing series, cars have a minimum allowable weight. Often, the actual weight of the car is lower, so ballast is used to bring it up to the minimum. The advantage is that the ballast can be positioned to affect the car's handling by changing its load distribution. This is near-universal in Formula 1. It is also common in other racing series that ballast may only be located in certain positions on the car. In some racing series, for example the British Touring Car Championship, ballast is used as a handicap, the leading drivers at the end of one race being given more ballast for the next race.

Ballast may also be carried aboard an aircraft. For example, in gliding it may be used to increase speed or adjust the aircraft's center of gravity, or in a balloon as a buoyancy compensator.
