= 2011 RAC Tourist Trophy =

Map of the Silverstone Circuit

The 2011 RAC Tourist Trophy was an auto racing event held at the Silverstone Circuit, Silverstone, England on 3–5 June, and was the fifth round of the 2011 FIA GT1 World Championship season. It was the FIA GT1 World Championship's second race held at the 5.901 km (3.667 mi) Silverstone, although it is the first international racing series to use the brand new pit complex which was being built at the time of last years race. The event was supported by the FIA GT3 European Championship, GT4 European Cup and Lamborghini Blancpain Super Trofeo.

== Background ==
Success Ballast
Entry	Ballast
No. 4 Hexis AMR	30 kg (66 lb)
No. 8 Young Driver AMR	30 kg (66 lb)
No. 37 All-Inkl.com Münnich Motorsport	25 kg (55 lb)
No. 20 Sumo Power GT	5 kg (11 lb)
No. 21 Sumo Power GT	5 kg (11 lb)
No. 38 All-Inkl.com Münnich Motorsport	5 kg (11 lb)

After a collision between the two Swiss Racing Team Lamborghini's, the team decided to miss the Tourist Trophy as they could not repair the damage in time for the weekend. DKR Engineering returned to the grid with the one car after missing the Sachsenring round due to lack of spare parts available. Markus Palttala and Andreas Zuber return to the series. Palttala returns behind the wheel of a Ford GT replacing Yann Clairay in the No. 10 Belgian Racing machine, racing alongside Antoine Leclerc. He raced a full season for Marc VDS Racing Team in 2010. Zuber raced for Exim Bank Team China alongside Mike Hezemans, replacing Nick Catsburg. Zuber raced only the first two rounds in 2010 for Phoenix Racing / Carsport who also ran a Corvette similar to the one he used at Silverstone. Dimitri Enjalbert makes his GT1 début for DKR Engineering alongside French compatriot Michaël Rossi, replacing Matteo Bobbi.

== Qualifying ==
=== Qualifying result ===
For qualifying, Driver 1 participates in the first and third sessions while Driver 2 participates in only the second session. The fastest lap for each session is indicated with bold.

Pos	No.	Driver 1	Team	Session 1	Session 2	Session 3	Grid
Pos	No.	Driver 2	Team	Session 1	Session 2	Session 3	Grid
1	11	(Netherlands) Mike Hezemans	Exim Bank Team China	1:59.584	1:59.334	1:58.967	1
1	11	(Austria) Andreas Zuber	Exim Bank Team China	1:59.584	1:59.334	1:58.967	1
2	23	(Germany) Michael Krumm	(United Kingdom) JR Motorsports	1:59.384	1:59.506	1:59.140	2
2	23	(Germany) Lucas Luhr	(United Kingdom) JR Motorsports	1:59.384	1:59.506	1:59.140	2
3	7	(Czech Republic) Tomáš Enge	(Germany) Young Driver AMR	1:59.344	1:59.799	1:59.361	3
3	7	(Germany) Alex Müller	(Germany) Young Driver AMR	1:59.344	1:59.799	1:59.361	3
4	8	(Germany) Stefan Mücke	(Germany) Young Driver AMR	1:59.510	1:59.816	1:59.595	4
4	8	(United Kingdom) Darren Turner	(Germany) Young Driver AMR	1:59.510	1:59.816	1:59.595	4
5	22	(United Kingdom) Richard Westbrook	(United Kingdom) JR Motorsports	1:59.376	1:59.803	2:00.043	5
5	22	(United Kingdom) Peter Dumbreck	(United Kingdom) JR Motorsports	1:59.376	1:59.803	2:00.043	5
6	21	(United Kingdom) Jamie Campbell-Walter	(United Kingdom) Sumo Power GT	2:00.091	1:59.727	2:00.068	6
6	21	(Australia) David Brabham	(United Kingdom) Sumo Power GT	2:00.091	1:59.727	2:00.068	6
7	20	(United Kingdom) Warren Hughes	(United Kingdom) Sumo Power GT	1:59.843	1:59.823	2:00.105	7
7	20	(Brazil) Enrique Bernoldi	(United Kingdom) Sumo Power GT	1:59.843	1:59.823	2:00.105	7
8	41	(France) Frédéric Makowiecki	(Belgium) Marc VDS Racing Team	2:00.364	1:59.683	2:00.592	8
8	41	(Belgium) Maxime Martin	(Belgium) Marc VDS Racing Team	2:00.364	1:59.683	2:00.592	8
9	3	(Netherlands) Stef Dusseldorp	(France) Hexis AMR	2:00.053	2:00.043		9
9	3	(Monaco) Clivio Piccione	(France) Hexis AMR	2:00.053	2:00.043		9
10	4	(Germany) Christian Hohenadel	(France) Hexis AMR	2:00.149	2:00.139		10
10	4	(Italy) Andrea Piccini	(France) Hexis AMR	2:00.149	2:00.139		10
11	37	(Netherlands) Nicky Pastorelli	(Germany) All-Inkl.com Münnich Motorsport	2:01.586	2:00.516		11
11	37	(Germany) Dominik Schwager	(Germany) All-Inkl.com Münnich Motorsport	2:01.586	2:00.516		11
12	40	(Belgium) Bas Leinders	(Belgium) Marc VDS Racing Team	2:00.792	2:00.786		12
12	40	(Germany) Marc Hennerici	(Belgium) Marc VDS Racing Team	2:00.792	2:00.786		12
13	47	(France) Dimitri Enjalbert	(Luxembourg) DKR Engineering	2:00.360	2:00.962		13
13	47	(France) Michaël Rossi	(Luxembourg) DKR Engineering	2:00.360	2:00.962		13
14	38	(Germany) Marc Basseng	(Germany) All-Inkl.com Münnich Motorsport	2:01.738	2:01.194		14
14	38	(Germany) Markus Winkelhock	(Germany) All-Inkl.com Münnich Motorsport	2:01.738	2:01.194		14
15	9	(Belgium) Vanina Ickx	(Belgium) Belgian Racing	2:01.986			15
15	9	(Denmark) Christoffer Nygaard	(Belgium) Belgian Racing	2:01.986			15
16	10	(France) Antoine Leclerc	(Belgium) Belgian Racing	2:02.490			16
16	10	(Finland) Markus Palttala	(Belgium) Belgian Racing	2:02.490			16

== Races ==
=== Qualifying Race ===
==== Race result ====
Pos	No.	Team	Drivers	Manufacturer	Laps	Time/Retired
1	7	(Germany) Young Driver AMR	(Czech Republic) Tomáš Enge (Germany) Alex Müller	Aston Martin	30	
2	23	(United Kingdom) JR Motorsports	(Germany) Michael Krumm (Germany) Lucas Luhr	Nissan	30	−1.840
3	11	Exim Bank Team China	(Netherlands) Mike Hezemans (Austria) Andreas Zuber	Corvette	30	−18.923
4	20	(United Kingdom) Sumo Power GT	(United Kingdom) Warren Hughes (Brazil) Enrique Bernoldi	Nissan	30	−26.681
5	3	(France) Hexis AMR	(Netherlands) Stef Dusseldorp (Monaco) Clivio Piccione	Aston Martin	30	−32.758
6	37	(Germany) All-Inkl.com Münnich Motorsport	(Netherlands) Nicky Pastorelli (Germany) Dominik Schwager	Lamborghini	30	−55.936
7	9	(Belgium) Belgian Racing	(Belgium) Vanina Ickx (Denmark) Christoffer Nygaard	Ford	30	−1:21.843
8	10	(Belgium) Belgian Racing	(France) Antoine Leclerc (Finland) Markus Palttala	Ford	30	−1:41.562
9	47	(Luxembourg) DKR Engineering	(France) Dimitri Enjalbert (France) Michaël Rossi	Corvette	30	−1:50.177
10	4	(France) Hexis AMR	(Germany) Christian Hohenadel (Italy) Andrea Piccini	Aston Martin	29	−1 lap
11 DNF	40	(Belgium) Marc VDS Racing Team	(Belgium) Bas Leinders (Germany) Marc Hennerici	Ford	23	Retired
12 NC	41	(Belgium) Marc VDS Racing Team	(France) Frédéric Makowiecki (Belgium) Maxime Martin	Ford	12	Not Classified
13 DNF	38	(Germany) All-Inkl.com Münnich Motorsport	(Germany) Marc Basseng (Germany) Markus Winkelhock	Lamborghini	8	Retired
14 DNF	21	(United Kingdom) Sumo Power GT	(United Kingdom) Jamie Campbell-Walter (Australia) David Brabham	Nissan	1	Collision
15 DNF	8	(Germany) Young Driver AMR	(Germany) Stefan Mücke (United Kingdom) Darren Turner	Aston Martin	1	Collision
16 DNF	22	(United Kingdom) JR Motorsport	(United Kingdom) Richard Westbrook (United Kingdom) Peter Dumbreck	Nissan	0	Collision

=== Championship Race ===
==== Race result ====
Pos	No.	Team	Drivers	Manufacturer	Laps	Time/Retired
1	23	(United Kingdom) JR Motorsports	(Germany) Michael Krumm (Germany) Lucas Luhr	Nissan	28	
2	7	(Germany) Young Driver AMR	(Czech Republic) Tomáš Enge (Germany) Alex Müller	Aston Martin	28	−0.220
3	11	Exim Bank Team China	(Netherlands) Mike Hezemans (Austria) Andreas Zuber	Corvette	28	−0.491
4	3	(France) Hexis AMR	(Monaco) Clivio Piccione (Netherlands) Stef Dusseldorp	Aston Martin	28	−2.417
5	38	(Germany) All-Inkl.com Münnich Motorsport	(Germany) Marc Basseng (Germany) Markus Winkelhock	Lamborghini	28	−7.436
6	40	(Belgium) Marc VDS Racing Team	(Belgium) Bas Leinders (Germany) Marc Hennerici	Ford	28	−10.831
7	20	(United Kingdom) Sumo Power GT	(United Kingdom) Warren Hughes (Brazil) Enrique Bernoldi	Nissan	28	−13.063
8	10	(Belgium) Belgian Racing	(France) Antoine Leclerc (Finland) Markus Palttala	Ford	28	−24.117
9	9	(Belgium) Belgian Racing	(Belgium) Vanina Ickx (Denmark) Christoffer Nygaard	Ford	28	−58.515
10 DNF	37	(Germany) All-Inkl.com Münnich Motorsport	(Germany) Dominik Schwager (Netherlands) Nicky Pastorelli	Lamborghini	25	Engine
11 DNF	41	(Belgium) Marc VDS Racing Team	(Belgium) Maxime Martin (France) Frédéric Makowiecki	Ford	17	Collision
12 DNF	21	(United Kingdom) Sumo Power GT	(Australia) David Brabham (United Kingdom) Jamie Campbell-Walter	Nissan	16	Collision
13 DNF	4	(France) Hexis AMR	(Germany) Christian Hohenadel (Italy) Andrea Piccini	Aston Martin	16	Collision
14 DNF	47	(Luxembourg) DKR Engineering	(France) Michaël Rossi (France) Dimitri Enjalbert	Corvette	16	Collision
15 DNF	8	(Germany) Young Driver AMR	(Germany) Stefan Mücke (United Kingdom) Darren Turner	Aston Martin	10	Collision
16 DNF	22	(United Kingdom) JR Motorsport	(United Kingdom) Richard Westbrook (United Kingdom) Peter Dumbreck	Nissan	10	Collision

FIA GT1 World Championship
Previous race: Sachsenring	2011 season	Next race: Navarra
