= Antoine Leclerc =

French racing driver (born 1981)

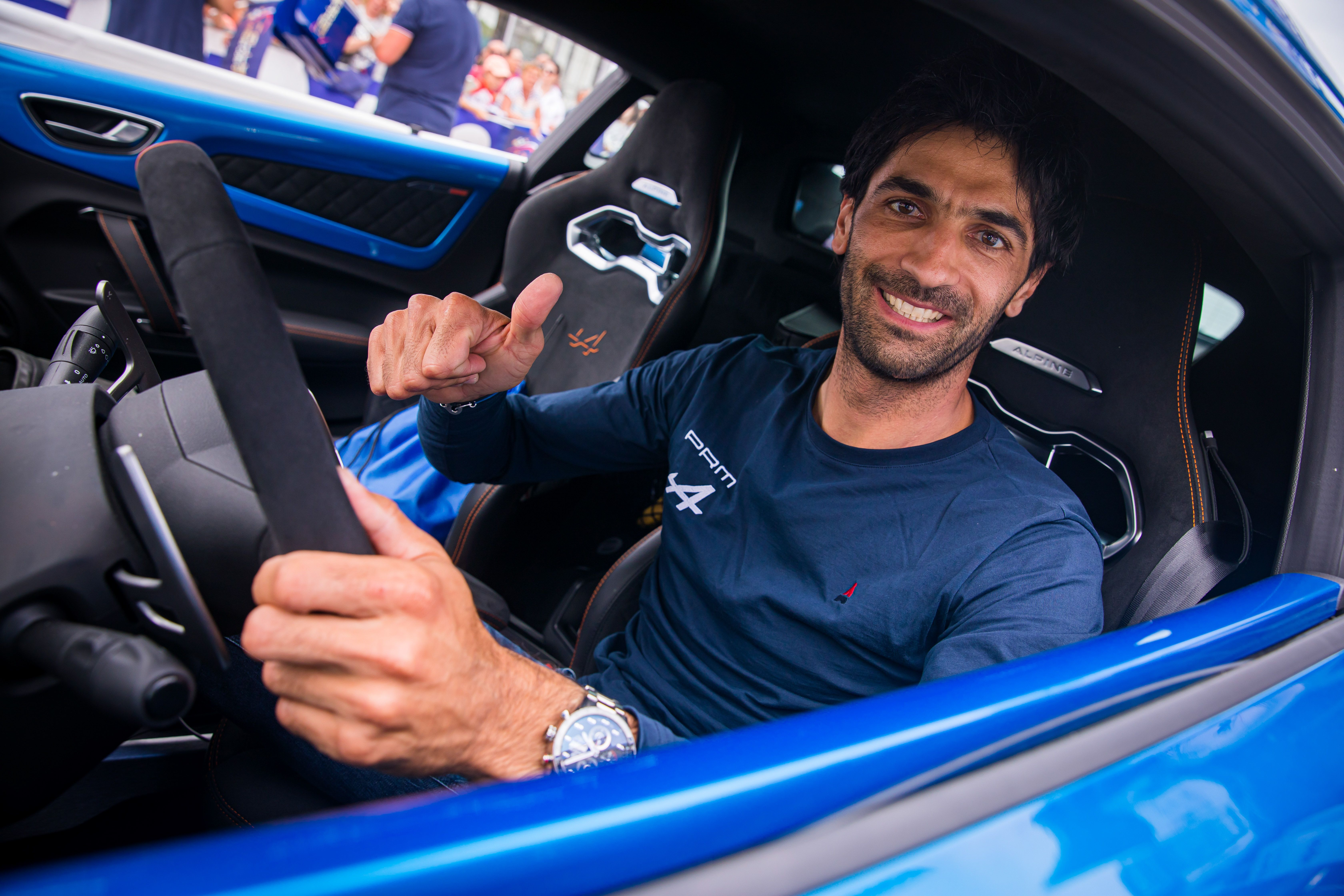
- Leclerc in 2022
- Nationality: (France) French
- Born: 10 December 1981 (age 44) Épinal, France
- Categorisation: FIA Gold (until 2023); FIA Silver (2024–)

Championship titles
- 2008: French GT Championship – GT3

Antoine Leclerc (born 10 December 1981) is a French racing driver who last competed for Code Racing Development in the GT4 European Series.

== Career ==
Leclerc made his single-seater debut in 2001, racing in the French Formula Renault Campus series, before moving to its Formula Renault 2.0 counterpart for the following two years. After making his sportscar debut in the 2004 Bahrain GT Festival, Leclerc joined Force One to race in the following year's French GT Championship, in which he scored a lone podium at Nogaro as he finished the year 17th in points.

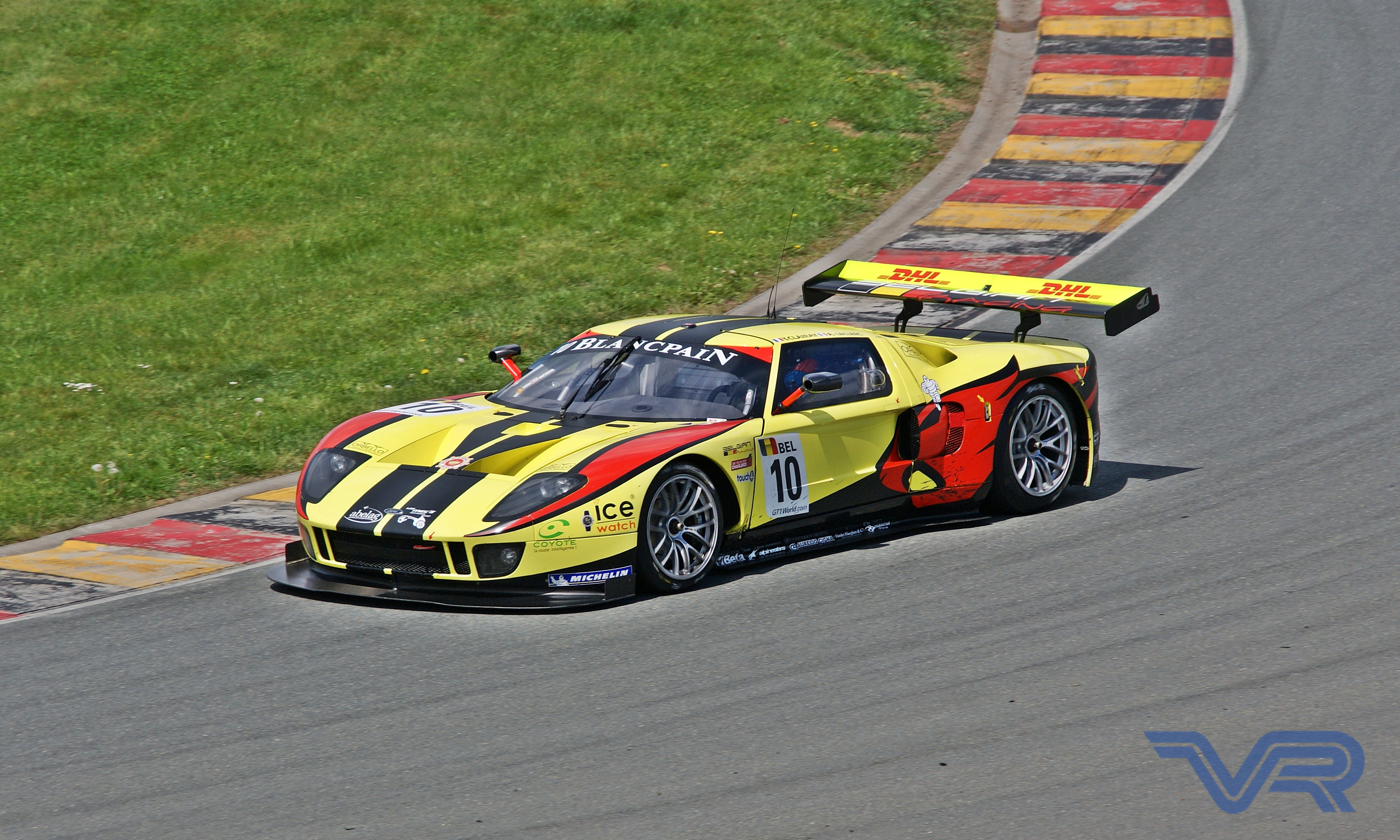
Leclerc's Belgian Racing Ford GT1 at Sachsenring in 2011.

Following his sophomore year in the series in 2007 for First Racing, Leclerc remained with the team for 2008, taking two wins and six more podiums en route to the GT3 title. Leclerc then continued with the team for his title defence the following year, before making one-off appearances in the FIA GT3 European Championship and 2010 ADAC GT Masters for Mühlner Motorsport in 2010. Transitioning to the FIA GT1 World Championship with Belgian Racing for 2011, Leclerc took a best result of sixth at San Luis to end the year 24th in points. After racing in the 2012 Blancpain Endurance Series for Pro GT by Alméras, Leclerc joined McLaren-fielding ART Grand Prix to race in the Blancpain Endurance Series and the French GT Championship the following year. In his sophomore season in the series, Leclerc finished second in the season-opening race at Monza, before ending the year with a third-place finish at the Nürburgring en route to a fifth-place points finish in the Pro standings.

In 2014, Leclerc joined M-Sport to continue in the Blancpain Endurance Series ad a new addition to the Bentley factory roster. In his only season in the roster, Leclerc scored a best result of seventh at Monza and two other points finishes to round out the year 17th in the Pro standings. During 2014, Leclerc also finished third in the Electric Pau Grand Prix, and sampled Formula E machinery. Leclerc then raced in the 2015 VLN Series and competed in the 2016 RallyCircuit Paul Ricard, before taking a year out of racing as he founded Performance Racing Motorsport.

One-off appearances in the French GT4 Cup and the GT4 International Cup then followed in 2018, as well as a one-off appearance in the Alpine Elf Europa Cup in 2020, before returning to full-time racing the following year by joining Arkadia Racing to compete in the GT4 European Series. Racing in the Pro-Am class, Leclerc scored a best class finish of third in race one at Barcelona as he ended the year sixth in class. Switching to Code Racing Development for 2022, Leclerc won overall in race one at Spa, as well as winning in class at Misano to round out the season seventh in Pro-Am. Remaining with Code Racing Development for 2023, Leclerc opened up the season with class wins at Monza and Le Castellet, before taking his third class win of the year at Barcelona to secure runner-up honors in Pro-Am. Continuing with the team as he stepped up to the Silver Cup for 2024, Leclerc took a lone overall win in race two at the Hockenheimring en route to a ninth-place points finish.

Following a year on the sidelines, Leclerc returned to Code Racing Development to race in the GT3 class of the 2026 Le Mans Cup, but was replaced prior to the season.

== Racing record ==
=== Racing career summary ===
Season	Series	Team	Races	Wins	Poles	F/Laps	Podiums	Points	Position
2001	Championnat de France de Formule Renault Elf Campus							55	14th
2002	Formule Renault 2.0 Cup France	TCS Racing	3	0	0	0	0	0	NC
2002	Formula Renault 2.0 Fran-Am	TCS Racing	1	0	0	0	0	16	16th
2003	Formule Renault 2.0 Cup France	Tech 1 Racing	8	0	0	0	0	18	19th
2005	French GT Championship	Force One	11	0	0	0	1	65	17th
2006	Peugeot RC Cup		5	0	0	0	0	27	14th
2007	French GT Championship – GT3	First Racing	12	0	0	1	3	115	9th
2007	Spa 24 Hours	S-Berg Racing	1	0	0	0	0	—N/a	DNF
2008	French GT Championship – GT3	First Racing	14	2	0	2	8	220	**1st**
2008	FIA GT3 European Championship	S-Berg Racing	1	0	0	0	0	0	NC
2009	French GT Championship – GT3	First Racing	14	0	0	0	3	160	5th
2010	FIA GT3 European Championship	Mühlner Motorsport	2	0	0	0	1	21	21st
2010	ADAC GT Masters	Mühlner Motorsport	2	0	0	0	0	2	31st
2011	FIA GT1 World Championship	Belgian Racing	18	0	0	0	0	13	24th
2011	Blancpain Endurance Series – Pro	Marc VDS Racing Team	1	0	0	0	0	11	26th
2012	Blancpain Endurance Series – Pro-Am	Pro GT by Alméras	5	0	0	0	0	0	NC
2012	Speed EuroSeries	JMP Racing	1	0	0	0	0	7	44th
2013	Blancpain Endurance Series – Pro	ART Grand Prix	5	0	0	0	2	41	5th
2013	French GT Championship – GT3	ART Grand Prix	13	0	0	0	1	81	10th
2014	Blancpain Endurance Series – Pro	M-Sport Bentley	5	0	0	0	0	15	17th
2015	VLN Series – SP10	STADAvita Racing Team	1	0	0	0	1	0	NC
2018	French GT4 Cup – Pro-Am	Riviera Motorsport	2	0	0	0	0	0	NC
2018	GT4 International Cup – Pro-Am	Classic and Modern Racing	1	0	0	0	0	—N/a	DNF
2020	Alpine Elf Europa Cup	Racing Technology	1	0	0	0	0	0	NC
2021	GT4 European Series – Pro-Am	Arkadia Racing	12	0	0	0	1	76	6th
2022	24H GT Series – GT4	Orchid Racing Team	1	0	0	0	1	15	NC
2022	GT4 European Series – Pro-Am	Code Racing Development	11	2	3	0	3	85	7th
2022	GT World Challenge Europe Endurance Cup	Boutsen Racing	1	0	0	0	0	0	NC
2022	GT World Challenge Europe Endurance Cup – Gold	Boutsen Racing	1	0	0	0	0	0	NC
2023	GT4 European Series – Pro-Am	Code Racing Development	12	1	3	1	8	145	**2nd**
2024	GT4 European Series – Silver	Code Racing Development	12	1	0	0	1	56	9th
2026	24H Series – 992	Orchid Racing Team	1	0	0	0	1	32	21st

=== Complete FIA GT3 European Championship results ===
(key) (Races in bold indicate pole position; races in italics indicate fastest lap)

Year	Entrant	Chassis	Engine	1	2	3	4	5	6	7	8	9	10	11	12	Pos.	Points
2008	S-Berg Racing	Lamborghini Gallardo GT3	Lamborghini 07L1 5.0 L V10	SIL; 1	SIL; 2	MNZ; 1	MNZ; 2	OSC; 1	OSC; 2	BRN; 1	BRN; 2	NOG; 1	NOG; 2	DUB; 1 Ret	DUB; 2 DNS	NC	0
2010	Mühlner Motorsport	Porsche 997 GT3-R	Porsche 4.0 L Flat-6	SIL; 1	SIL; 2	BRN; 1	BRN; 2	JAR; 1	JAR; 2	LEC; 1; 3	LEC; 2; 7	ALG; 1	ALG; 2	ZOL; 1	ZOL; 2	21st	21

=== Complete ADAC GT Masters results ===
(key) (Races in bold indicate pole position) (Races in italics indicate fastest lap)

Year	Team	Car	1	2	3	4	5	6	7	8	9	10	11	12	13	14	DC	Points
2010	Mühlner Motorsport	Porsche 997 GT3-R	OSC1; 1	OSC1; 2	SAC; 1	SAC; 2	HOC; 1	HOC; 2	ASS; 1; 7	ASS; 2; 11	LAU; 1	LAU; 2	NÜR; 1	NÜR; 2	OSC2; 1	OSC2; 2	31st	2

=== Complete FIA GT1 World Championship results ===
Year	Team	Car	1	2	3	4	5	6	7	8	9	10	11	12	13	14	15	16	17	18	19	20	Pos.	Pts
2011	Belgian Racing	Ford	ABU; QR; 14	ABU; CR; Ret	ZOL; QR	ZOL; CR	ALG; QR; 16	ALG; CR; Ret	SAC; QR; 13	SAC; CR; 10	SIL; QR; 8	SIL; CR; 8	NAV; QR; Ret	NAV; CR; Ret	LEC; QR; Ret	LEC; CR; Ret	ORD; QR; 13	ORD; CR; 11	BEI; QR; Ret	BEI; CR; Ret	SAN; QR; 10	SAN; CR; 6	24th	13

=== Complete GT World Challenge results ===
==== GT World Challenge Europe Endurance Cup ====
(Races in bold indicate pole position) (Races in italics indicate fastest lap)

Year	Team	Car	Class	1	2	3	4	5	6	7	8	Pos.	Points
2011	Marc VDS Racing Team	Ford GT GT3	GT3 Pro	MNZ	NAV	SPA; 6H ?	SPA; 12H ?	SPA; 24H; 11	MAG	SIL		26th	11
2012	Pro GT by Alméras	Porsche 997 GT3-R	Pro-Am	MNZ; 26	SIL; 25	LEC; DNS	SPA; 6H ?	SPA; 12H ?	SPA; 24H; Ret	NÜR; 23	NAV; Ret	NC	0
2013	ART Grand Prix	McLaren MP4-12C GT3	Pro	MNZ; 2	SIL; 46†	LEC; 8	SPA; 6H; Ret	SPA; 12H; Ret	SPA; 24H; Ret	NÜR; 3		5th	41
2014	M-Sport Bentley	Bentley Continental GT3	Pro	MNZ; 7	SIL; 15	LEC; Ret	SPA; 6H; 43	SPA; 12H; 25	SPA; 24H; 17	NÜR; 12		17th	15
2022	Boutsen Racing	Audi R8 LMS Evo II	Gold	IMO	LEC	SPA; 6H; 56	SPA; 12H; Ret	SPA; 24H; Ret	HOC	CAT		NC	0

=== Complete GT4 European Series results ===
(key) (Races in bold indicate pole position) (Races in italics indicate fastest lap)

Year	Team	Car	Class	1	2	3	4	5	6	7	8	9	10	11	12	Pos	Points
2021	Arkadia Racing	Alpine A110 GT4	Pro-Am	MNZ; 1; 19	MNZ; 2; 12	LEC; 1; 19	LEC; 2 Ret	ZAN; 1; 24	ZAN; 2; 30	SPA; 1; 15	SPA; 2; 15	NÜR; 1; 20	NÜR; 2 Ret	CAT; 1; 7	CAT; 2; 16	6th	76
2022	Code Racing Development	Alpine A110 GT4	Pro-Am	IMO; 1 DNS	IMO; 2; 40†	LEC; 1; 7	LEC; 2; 42†	MIS; 1 Ret	MIS; 2; 5	**SPA**; **1**; 1	**SPA**; **2**; 6	HOC; 1; 21	HOC; 2; 22	CAT; 1 Ret	CAT; 2 Ret	7th	85
2023	Code Racing Development	Alpine A110 GT4	Pro-Am	MNZ; 1; 38	MNZ; 2; 10	LEC; 1; 13	LEC; 2; 10	SPA; 1; 11	SPA; 2; 38	MIS; 1; 21	MIS; 2; 36	HOC; 1; 14	HOC; 2; 9	CAT; 1; 3	CAT; 2; 10	2nd	169
2024	Code Racing Development	Alpine A110 GT4	Silver	LEC; 1; 4	LEC; 2; 8	MIS; 1 Ret	MIS; 2; 27	SPA; 1; 6	SPA; 2; 15	HOC; 1; 11	HOC; 2; 1	MNZ; 1 Ret	MNZ; 2 WD	JED; 1; 10	JED; 2; 8	9th	56
