= 2011 FIA GT3 European Championship =

Seasons
- ← 2010 2012 →

The 2011 FIA GT3 European Championship season was the sixth season of the FIA GT3 European Championship. The season commenced on May 8 at Algarve and ended on October 16 at Zandvoort. The season featured six double-header rounds, with each race lasting for a duration of 60 minutes. Most of the events were support races to the 2011 FIA GT1 World Championship season.

== Calendar ==
On December 10, 2010, the FIA World Motor Sport Council announced the 2010 calendar in co-ordinance with the FIA GT1 World Championship. On 30 May 2011, the round in Smolensk was dropped from the schedule. On 21 July, a replacement round at the Slovakiaring was announced.

Rnd	Circuit	Date
1	Autódromo Internacional do Algarve, Portimão, Portugal	8 May
2	Silverstone Circuit, United Kingdom	5 June
3	Circuito de Navarra, Los Arcos, Spain	3 July
4	Circuit Paul Ricard, Le Castellet, France	17 July
5	Automotodróm Slovakia Ring, Orechová Potôň, Slovakia	21 August
6	Circuit Park Zandvoort, Zandvoort, Netherlands	16 October

== Entries ==
2011 sees a new manufacturer in the series with Mercedes-Benz joining the GT3 grid with their SLS-AMG sports cars. Ferrari have replaced the F430 with the brand new 458 Italia. The F430 is still eligible to race in this year's season, as is the Chevrolet Corvette Z06.R and BMW Alpina B6 GT3 that competed last year. The only car switch from a team has come from Graff Racing who have switched from racing a Corvette last year to the new Mercedes-Benz SLS. There are also a few new teams on the entry list from round one mostly from the new cars that Ferrari and Mercedes-Benz have produced.

Team	Chassis	Engine	No.	Drivers	Rounds	Tyres
(Belgium) Prospeed Competition	Porsche 997 GT3-R	Porsche 4.0 L Flat-6	1	(Netherlands) Paul van Splunteren	All	M
(Belgium) Prospeed Competition	Porsche 997 GT3-R	Porsche 4.0 L Flat-6	1	(Belgium) Maxime Soulet	All	M
(Belgium) Prospeed Competition	Porsche 997 GT3-R	Porsche 4.0 L Flat-6	2	(Belgium) Jan Heylen	All	M
(Belgium) Prospeed Competition	Porsche 997 GT3-R	Porsche 4.0 L Flat-6	2	(Finland) Petri Lappalainen	All	M
(France) Graff Racing	Mercedes-Benz SLS AMG GT3	Mercedes-Benz 6.2 L V8	3	(Switzerland) Philippe Giauque	1–5	M
(France) Graff Racing	Mercedes-Benz SLS AMG GT3	Mercedes-Benz 6.2 L V8	3	(France) Mike Parisy	All	M
(France) Graff Racing	Mercedes-Benz SLS AMG GT3	Mercedes-Benz 6.2 L V8	3	(France) Grégoire Demoustier	6	M
(France) Graff Racing	Mercedes-Benz SLS AMG GT3	Mercedes-Benz 6.2 L V8	4	(Switzerland) Joakim Lambotte	1–5	M
(France) Graff Racing	Mercedes-Benz SLS AMG GT3	Mercedes-Benz 6.2 L V8	4	(Switzerland) Gary Hirsch	1–2	M
(France) Graff Racing	Mercedes-Benz SLS AMG GT3	Mercedes-Benz 6.2 L V8	4	(France) Grégoire Demoustier	3–5	M
(France) Graff Racing	Mercedes-Benz SLS AMG GT3	Mercedes-Benz 6.2 L V8	4	(Switzerland) Philippe Giauque	6	M
(France) Graff Racing	Mercedes-Benz SLS AMG GT3	Mercedes-Benz 6.2 L V8	4	(Germany) Thomas Jäger	6	M
(Monaco) JMB Racing	Ferrari 458 Italia GT3	Ferrari 4.5 L V8	5	(France) Edouard Gravereaux	4	M
(Monaco) JMB Racing	Ferrari 458 Italia GT3	Ferrari 4.5 L V8	5	(France) Nicolas Marroc	4	M
(Germany) Need for Speed Team Schubert	BMW Z4 GT3	BMW 4.4 L V8	6	(Saudi Arabia) Abdulaziz Al-Faisal	All	D M
(Germany) Need for Speed Team Schubert	BMW Z4 GT3	BMW 4.4 L V8	6	(Sweden) Edward Sandström	All	D M
(Germany) Need for Speed Team Schubert	BMW Z4 GT3	BMW 4.4 L V8	7	(Germany) Claudia Hürtgen	All	D M
(Germany) Need for Speed Team Schubert	BMW Z4 GT3	BMW 4.4 L V8	7	(Hungary) Csaba Walter	All	D M
(France) Team LMP Motorsport	Aston Martin DBRS9	Aston Martin 6.0 L V12	8	(France) Dimitri Enjalbert	1–2	M
(France) Team LMP Motorsport	Aston Martin DBRS9	Aston Martin 6.0 L V12	8	(Belgium) Bernard Delhez	1–2	M
(France) Team LMP Motorsport	Aston Martin DBRS9	Aston Martin 6.0 L V12	8	(France) Frédéric Gabillon	3	M
(France) Team LMP Motorsport	Aston Martin DBRS9	Aston Martin 6.0 L V12	8	(France) Jean-Charles Battut	3	M
(France) Team LMP Motorsport	Aston Martin DBRS9	Aston Martin 6.0 L V12	8	(France) Jean-Charles Miginiac	4	M
(France) Team LMP Motorsport	Aston Martin DBRS9	Aston Martin 6.0 L V12	8	(France) Grégory Guilvert	4	M
(France) Team LMP Motorsport	Aston Martin DBRS9	Aston Martin 6.0 L V12	8	(Belgium) Edouard Mondron	6	M
(France) Team LMP Motorsport	Aston Martin DBRS9	Aston Martin 6.0 L V12	8	(France) Gael Castelli	6	M
(France) Team LMP Motorsport	Aston Martin DBRS9	Aston Martin 6.0 L V12	9	(Belgium) Maxime Martin	All	M
(France) Team LMP Motorsport	Aston Martin DBRS9	Aston Martin 6.0 L V12	9	(France) Gaël Lesoudier	All	M
(Czech Republic) Gravity Charouz Racing	Mercedes-Benz SLS AMG GT3	Mercedes-Benz 6.2 L V8	11	(Czech Republic) Tomáš Kostka	1–2	M
(Czech Republic) Gravity Charouz Racing	Mercedes-Benz SLS AMG GT3	Mercedes-Benz 6.2 L V8	11	(Russia) Leonid Machitski	All	M
(Czech Republic) Gravity Charouz Racing	Mercedes-Benz SLS AMG GT3	Mercedes-Benz 6.2 L V8	11	(Czech Republic) Jarek Janiš	3–5	M
(Czech Republic) Gravity Charouz Racing	Mercedes-Benz SLS AMG GT3	Mercedes-Benz 6.2 L V8	11	(Slovakia) Štefan Rosina	6	M
(Czech Republic) Gravity Charouz Racing	Mercedes-Benz SLS AMG GT3	Mercedes-Benz 6.2 L V8	12	(Czech Republic) Jan Stoviček	All	M
(Czech Republic) Gravity Charouz Racing	Mercedes-Benz SLS AMG GT3	Mercedes-Benz 6.2 L V8	12	(Czech Republic) Jakub Knoll	All	M
(Germany) Fischer Racing	Ford GT GT3	Ford Cammer 5.0 L V8	13	(Finland) Markus Palttala	1–2, 4–6	M
(Germany) Fischer Racing	Ford GT GT3	Ford Cammer 5.0 L V8	13	(Brazil) Paulo Bonifácio	1	M
(Germany) Fischer Racing	Ford GT GT3	Ford Cammer 5.0 L V8	13	(Belgium) Stéphane Lémeret	2	M
(Germany) Fischer Racing	Ford GT GT3	Ford Cammer 5.0 L V8	13	(United Kingdom) James Emmett	4	M
(Germany) Fischer Racing	Ford GT GT3	Ford Cammer 5.0 L V8	13	(Czech Republic) Martin Matzke	5	M
(Germany) Fischer Racing	Ford GT GT3	Ford Cammer 5.0 L V8	13	(Finland) Jesse Krohn	6	M
(Germany) Fischer Racing	Ford GT GT3	Ford Cammer 5.0 L V8	14	(Finland) Mikko Eskelinen	All	M
(Germany) Fischer Racing	Ford GT GT3	Ford Cammer 5.0 L V8	14	(Denmark) Christoffer Nygaard	All	M
(France) Saintéloc Racing	Audi R8 LMS	Audi 5.2 L V10	15	(France) Jérôme Demay	All	M
(France) Saintéloc Racing	Audi R8 LMS	Audi 5.2 L V10	15	(France) Dino Lunardi	All	M
(France) Saintéloc Racing	Audi R8 LMS	Audi 5.2 L V10	16	(Switzerland) Pierre Hirschi	All	M
(France) Saintéloc Racing	Audi R8 LMS	Audi 5.2 L V10	16	(France) Grégory Guilvert	1, 6	M
(France) Saintéloc Racing	Audi R8 LMS	Audi 5.2 L V10	16	(France) Michaël Rossi	2	M
(France) Saintéloc Racing	Audi R8 LMS	Audi 5.2 L V10	16	(France) Lionel Mazars	3	M
(France) Saintéloc Racing	Audi R8 LMS	Audi 5.2 L V10	16	(France) Marc Sourd	4	M
(France) Saintéloc Racing	Audi R8 LMS	Audi 5.2 L V10	16	(France) Adrien Tambay	5	M
(United Kingdom) MTECH Motorsport	Ferrari 458 Italia GT3	Ferrari 4.5 L V8	20	(Italy) Luca Pirri	1–2	M
(United Kingdom) MTECH Motorsport	Ferrari 458 Italia GT3	Ferrari 4.5 L V8	20	(United Kingdom) Paul Rees	1	M
(United Kingdom) MTECH Motorsport	Ferrari 458 Italia GT3	Ferrari 4.5 L V8	20	(United Kingdom) Michael Lyons	2	M
(United Kingdom) MTECH Motorsport	Ferrari 458 Italia GT3	Ferrari 4.5 L V8	20	(Slovakia) Jan Danis	5	M
(United Kingdom) MTECH Motorsport	Ferrari 458 Italia GT3	Ferrari 4.5 L V8	20	(Slovakia) Zdeno Mikulasko	5	M
(United Kingdom) MTECH Motorsport	Ferrari 458 Italia GT3	Ferrari 4.5 L V8	21	(Republic of Ireland) Matt Griffin	All	M
(United Kingdom) MTECH Motorsport	Ferrari 458 Italia GT3	Ferrari 4.5 L V8	21	(United Kingdom) Duncan Cameron	All	M
(United States) United Autosports	Audi R8 LMS	Audi 5.2 L V10	22	(United States) Mark Patterson	All	D M
(United States) United Autosports	Audi R8 LMS	Audi 5.2 L V10	22	(United Kingdom) Joe Osborne	All	D M
(United States) United Autosports	Audi R8 LMS	Audi 5.2 L V10	23	(United States) Zak Brown	All	D M
(United States) United Autosports	Audi R8 LMS	Audi 5.2 L V10	23	(United Kingdom) Matt Bell	All	D M
(Germany) Reiter Engineering	Lamborghini Gallardo LP600+	Lamborghini 5.2 L V10	24	(Germany) Albert von Thurn und Taxis	3–6	M
(Germany) Reiter Engineering	Lamborghini Gallardo LP600+	Lamborghini 5.2 L V10	24	(Austria) Nikolaus Mayr-Melnhof	3–6	M
(Germany) Reiter Engineering	Lamborghini Gallardo LP600+	Lamborghini 5.2 L V10	25	(Germany) Albert von Thurn und Taxis	1–2	M
(Germany) Reiter Engineering	Lamborghini Gallardo LP600+	Lamborghini 5.2 L V10	25	(Austria) Nikolaus Mayr-Melnhof	1–2	M
(Germany) Reiter Engineering	Lamborghini Gallardo LP600+	Lamborghini 5.2 L V10	25	(Netherlands) Nico Pronk	4	M
(Germany) Reiter Engineering	Lamborghini Gallardo LP600+	Lamborghini 5.2 L V10	25	(Canada) Eugenio Amos	4	M
(Germany) Reiter Engineering	Lamborghini Gallardo LP600+	Lamborghini 5.2 L V10	25	(Slovakia) Anton Kiaba	5	M
(Germany) Reiter Engineering	Lamborghini Gallardo LP600+	Lamborghini 5.2 L V10	25	(Slovakia) Štefan Rosina	5	M
(Germany) Reiter Engineering	Lamborghini Gallardo LP600+	Lamborghini 5.2 L V10	25	(Sweden) Max Nilsson	6	M
(Germany) Reiter Engineering	Lamborghini Gallardo LP600+	Lamborghini 5.2 L V10	25	(Netherlands) Henry Zumbrink	6	M
(Belgium) Belgian Audi Club Team WRT	Audi R8 LMS	Audi 5.2 L V10	32	(France) Didier André	All	M
(Belgium) Belgian Audi Club Team WRT	Audi R8 LMS	Audi 5.2 L V10	32	(France) David Hallyday	1	M
(Belgium) Belgian Audi Club Team WRT	Audi R8 LMS	Audi 5.2 L V10	32	(Germany) Tobias Neuser	2–3	M
(Belgium) Belgian Audi Club Team WRT	Audi R8 LMS	Audi 5.2 L V10	32	(France) Gary Chalandon	4	M
(Belgium) Belgian Audi Club Team WRT	Audi R8 LMS	Audi 5.2 L V10	32	(Slovakia) Jirko Malchárek	5	M
(Belgium) Belgian Audi Club Team WRT	Audi R8 LMS	Audi 5.2 L V10	32	(Belgium) Gregory Franchi	6	M
(Belgium) Belgian Audi Club Team WRT	Audi R8 LMS	Audi 5.2 L V10	33	(Belgium) Enzo Ide	All	M
(Belgium) Belgian Audi Club Team WRT	Audi R8 LMS	Audi 5.2 L V10	33	(Belgium) Gregory Franchi	1–5	M
(Belgium) Belgian Audi Club Team WRT	Audi R8 LMS	Audi 5.2 L V10	33	(Germany) Christopher Haase	6	M
(Netherlands) Faster Racing by DB Motorsport	BMW Z4 GT3	BMW 4.4 L V8	35	(Netherlands) Jeroen de Boer	All	M
(Netherlands) Faster Racing by DB Motorsport	BMW Z4 GT3	BMW 4.4 L V8	35	(Netherlands) Hoevert Vos	All	M
(Netherlands) Faster Racing by DB Motorsport	BMW Z4 GT3	BMW 4.4 L V8	36	(Netherlands) Nick Catsburg	All	M
(Netherlands) Faster Racing by DB Motorsport	BMW Z4 GT3	BMW 4.4 L V8	36	(Netherlands) Harrie Kolen	All	M
(United Kingdom) Scuderia Vittoria	Ferrari 458 Italia GT3	Ferrari 4.5 L V8	38	(Italy) Giacomo Petrobelli	3	M
(United Kingdom) Scuderia Vittoria	Ferrari 458 Italia GT3	Ferrari 4.5 L V8	38	(Brazil) Carlos Iaconelli	3	M
(United Kingdom) Scuderia Vittoria	Ferrari 458 Italia GT3	Ferrari 4.5 L V8	38	(United Kingdom) Michael Lyons	6	M
(United Kingdom) Scuderia Vittoria	Ferrari 458 Italia GT3	Ferrari 4.5 L V8	38	(Czech Republic) Filip Salaquarda	6	M
(France) Team Cine Cascade	Lamborghini Gallardo LP600+	Lamborghini 5.2 L V10	39	(France) Jean-Claude Lagniez	6	M
(France) Team Cine Cascade	Lamborghini Gallardo LP600+	Lamborghini 5.2 L V10	39	(France) Julien Briché	6	M
(Portugal) Paulo Pinheiro	Mercedes-Benz SLS AMG GT3	Mercedes-Benz 6.2 L V8	43	(Portugal) Paulo Pinheiro	1	M
(Portugal) Paulo Pinheiro	Mercedes-Benz SLS AMG GT3	Mercedes-Benz 6.2 L V8	43	(United Kingdom) Roger Green	1	M
(Germany) Heico Motorsport	Mercedes-Benz SLS AMG GT3	Mercedes-Benz 6.2 L V8	44	(Luxembourg) Brice Bosi	All	M
(Germany) Heico Motorsport	Mercedes-Benz SLS AMG GT3	Mercedes-Benz 6.2 L V8	44	(Austria) Dominik Baumann	All	M
(Germany) Heico Motorsport	Mercedes-Benz SLS AMG GT3	Mercedes-Benz 6.2 L V8	45	(Austria) Patrick Hirsch	All	M
(Germany) Heico Motorsport	Mercedes-Benz SLS AMG GT3	Mercedes-Benz 6.2 L V8	45	(Slovakia) Filip Sladecka	1–5	M
(Germany) Heico Motorsport	Mercedes-Benz SLS AMG GT3	Mercedes-Benz 6.2 L V8	45	(Netherlands) Christiaan Frankenhout	6	M
(Netherlands) Aevitae Bleekemolen Racing	Porsche 997 GT3-R	Porsche 4.0 L Flat-6	46	(Netherlands) Ronald van de Laar	6	M
(Netherlands) Aevitae Bleekemolen Racing	Porsche 997 GT3-R	Porsche 4.0 L Flat-6	46	(Netherlands) Dennis van de Laar	6	M
(Italy) AF Corse	Ferrari 458 Italia GT3	Ferrari 4.5 L V8	50	(Italy) Francesco Castellacci	All	M
(Italy) AF Corse	Ferrari 458 Italia GT3	Ferrari 4.5 L V8	50	(Italy) Federico Leo	All	M
(Italy) AF Corse	Ferrari 458 Italia GT3	Ferrari 4.5 L V8	51	(United Kingdom) Daniel Brown	All	M
(Italy) AF Corse	Ferrari 458 Italia GT3	Ferrari 4.5 L V8	51	(United Kingdom) Glynn Geddie	All	M
(Italy) Ombra Racing	Ferrari 458 Italia GT3	Ferrari 4.5 L V8	52	(France) Yannick Mallegol	4	M
(Italy) Ombra Racing	Ferrari 458 Italia GT3	Ferrari 4.5 L V8	52	(France) Jean-Marc Bachelier	4	M

== Results and standings ==
=== Race results ===
Rnd.	Race	Circuit	Pole position	Fastest lap	Winner
1	R1	Algarve	(Italy) No. 50 AF Corse	(Germany) No. 6 Need for Speed Team Schubert	(Germany) No. 6 Need for Speed Team Schubert
1	R1	Algarve	(Italy) Francesco Castellacci (Italy) Federico Leo	(Sweden) Edward Sandström (Saudi Arabia) Abdulaziz Al-Faisal	(Sweden) Edward Sandström (Saudi Arabia) Abdulaziz Al-Faisal
1	R2	Algarve	(France) No. 3 Graff Racing	(France) No. 3 Graff Racing	(Belgium) No. 33 Belgian Audi Club Team WRT
1	R2	Algarve	(Switzerland) Philippe Giauque (France) Mike Parisy	(Switzerland) Philippe Giauque (France) Mike Parisy	(Belgium) Gregory Franchi (Belgium) Enzo Ide
2	R1	Silverstone	(Italy) No. 50 AF Corse	(Netherlands) No. 36 Faster Racing by DB Motorsport	(Italy) No. 50 AF Corse
2	R1	Silverstone	(Italy) Francesco Castellacci (Italy) Federico Leo	(Netherlands) Harrie Kolen (Netherlands) Nick Catsburg	(Italy) Francesco Castellacci (Italy) Federico Leo
2	R2	Silverstone	(Netherlands) No. 36 Faster Racing by DB Motorsport	(Netherlands) No. 36 Faster Racing by DB Motorsport	(Netherlands) No. 35 Faster Racing by DB Motorsport
2	R2	Silverstone	(Netherlands) Harrie Kolen (Netherlands) Nick Catsburg	(Netherlands) Harrie Kolen (Netherlands) Nick Catsburg	(Netherlands) Hoevert Vos (Netherlands) Jeroen de Boer
3	R1	Navarra	(Italy) No. 50 AF Corse	(Germany) No. 24 Reiter Engineering	(Germany) No. 24 Reiter Engineering
3	R1	Navarra	(Italy) Francesco Castellacci (Italy) Federico Leo	(Germany) Albert von Thurn und Taxis (Austria) Nikolaus Mayr-Melnhof	(Germany) Albert von Thurn und Taxis (Austria) Nikolaus Mayr-Melnhof
3	R2	Navarra	(Netherlands) No. 36 Faster Racing by DB Motorsport	(Netherlands) No. 36 Faster Racing by DB Motorsport	(Belgium) No. 33 Belgian Audi Club Team WRT
3	R2	Navarra	(Netherlands) Harrie Kolen (Netherlands) Nick Catsburg	(Netherlands) Harrie Kolen (Netherlands) Nick Catsburg	(Belgium) Gregory Franchi (Belgium) Enzo Ide
4	R1	Paul Ricard	(Germany) No. 24 Reiter Engineering	(Netherlands) No. 36 Faster Racing by DB Motorsport	(Germany) No. 24 Reiter Engineering
4	R1	Paul Ricard	(Germany) Albert von Thurn und Taxis (Austria) Nikolaus Mayr-Melnhof	(Netherlands) Harrie Kolen (Netherlands) Nick Catsburg	(Germany) Albert von Thurn und Taxis (Austria) Nikolaus Mayr-Melnhof
4	R2	Paul Ricard	(France) No. 3 Graff Racing	(France) No. 9 Team LMP Motorsport	(Belgium) No. 1 Prospeed Competition
4	R2	Paul Ricard	(Switzerland) Philippe Giauque (France) Mike Parisy	(Belgium) Maxime Martin (France) Gaël Lesoudier	(Netherlands) Paul van Splunteren (Belgium) Maxime Soulet
5	R1	Slovakiaring	(Germany) No. 24 Reiter Engineering	(France) No. 3 Graff Racing	(Germany) No. 44 Heico Motorsport
5	R1	Slovakiaring	(Germany) Albert von Thurn und Taxis (Austria) Nikolaus Mayr-Melnhof	(Switzerland) Philippe Giauque (France) Mike Parisy	(Austria) Dominik Baumann (Luxembourg) Brice Bosi
5	R2	Slovakiaring	(Germany) No. 25 Reiter Engineering	(Germany) No. 25 Reiter Engineering	(France) No. 3 Graff Racing
5	R2	Slovakiaring	(Slovakia) Anton Kiaba (Slovakia) Štefan Rosina	(Slovakia) Anton Kiaba (Slovakia) Štefan Rosina	(Switzerland) Philippe Giauque (France) Mike Parisy
6	R1	Zandvoort	(Germany) No. 44 Heico Motorsport	(United Kingdom) No. 38 Scuderia Vittoria	(Belgium) No. 1 Prospeed Competition
6	R1	Zandvoort	(Austria) Dominik Baumann (Luxembourg) Brice Bosi	(United Kingdom) Michael Lyons (Czech Republic) Filip Salaquarda	(Netherlands) Paul van Splunteren (Belgium) Maxime Soulet
6	R2	Zandvoort	(Belgium) No. 33 Belgian Audi Club Team WRT	(Belgium) No. 33 Belgian Audi Club Team WRT	(Belgium) No. 33 Belgian Audi Club Team WRT
6	R2	Zandvoort	(Germany) Christopher Haase (Belgium) Enzo Ide	(Germany) Christopher Haase (Belgium) Enzo Ide	(Germany) Christopher Haase (Belgium) Enzo Ide

=== Championships ===
Championship points will be awarded to the first ten positions in each race. Entries must complete 75% of the winning car's race distance in order to be classified and earn points. Individual drivers are required to participate for a minimum of 25 minutes in order to earn championship points in any race.

Points System
Position
1st	2nd	3rd	4th	5th	6th	7th	8th	9th	10th
25	18	15	12	10	8	6	4	2	1

==== Drivers' Championship ====
Pos	Driver	Team	ALG (Portugal)		SIL (United Kingdom)		NAV (Spain)		PRI (France)		SLO (Slovakia)		ZAN (Netherlands)		Total
Pos	Driver	Team	R1	R2	R1	R2	R1	R2	R1	R2	R1	R2	R1	R2	Total
1=	(Italy) Francesco Castellacci	(Italy) AF Corse	DNS	2	1	11	7	Ret	2	4	2	21	9	4	111
1=	(Italy) Federico Leo	(Italy) AF Corse	DNS	2	1	11	7	Ret	2	4	2	21	9	4	111
2	(France) Mike Parisy	(France) Graff Racing	4	Ret	3	8	16	3	4	Ret	11	1	8	3	102
3	(Belgium) Enzo Ide	(Belgium) Belgian Audi Club Team WRT	9	1	20	Ret	6	1	12	3	15	22	17	1	100
4=	(Luxembourg) Brice Bosi	(Germany) Heico Motorsport	Ret	3	12	Ret	4	7	6	Ret	1	10	5	2	95
4=	(Austria) Dominik Baumann	(Germany) Heico Motorsport	Ret	3	12	Ret	4	7	6	Ret	1	10	5	2	95
5	(Switzerland) Philippe Giauque	(France) Graff Racing	4	Ret	3	8	16	3	4	Ret	11	1	15	5	93
6=	(Netherlands) Jeroen den Boer	(Netherlands) Faster Racing by DB Motorsport	3	11	5	1	3	9	Ret	Ret	Ret	4	10	8	84
6=	(Netherlands) Hoevert Vos	(Netherlands) Faster Racing by DB Motorsport	3	11	5	1	3	9	Ret	Ret	Ret	4	10	8	84
7=	(Belgium) Maxime Martin	(France) Team LMP Motorsport	Ret	7	2	3	21	5	9	2	4	12	25	Ret	81
7=	(France) Gaël Lesoudier	(France) Team LMP Motorsport	Ret	7	2	3	21	5	9	2	4	12	25	Ret	81
8=	(Austria) Nikolaus Mayr-Melnhof	(Germany) Reiter Engineering	Ret	4	11	15	1	12	1	Ret	Ret	16	3	12	77
8=	(Germany) Albert von Thurn und Taxis	(Germany) Reiter Engineering	Ret	4	11	15	1	12	1	Ret	Ret	16	3	12	77
9	(Belgium) Gregory Franchi	(Belgium) Belgian Audi Club Team WRT	9	1	20	Ret	6	1	12	3	15	22	18	Ret	75
10=	(Saudi Arabia) Abdulaziz Al-Faisal	(Germany) Need for Speed Team Schubert	1	Ret	4	6	2	13	Ret	5	17	9	13	13	75
10=	(Sweden) Edward Sandström	(Germany) Need for Speed Team Schubert	1	Ret	4	6	2	13	Ret	5	17	9	13	13	75
11=	(Germany) Claudia Hürtgen	(Germany) Need for Speed Team Schubert	2	5	6	EX	15	17	Ret	6	3	3	12	10	75
11=	(Hungary) Csaba Walter	(Germany) Need for Speed Team Schubert	2	5	6	EX	15	17	Ret	6	3	3	12	10	75
12=	(Netherlands) Paul van Splunteren	(Belgium) Prospeed Competition	12	14	18	10	Ret	Ret	5	1	19	5	1	Ret	71
12=	(Belgium) Maxime Soulet	(Belgium) Prospeed Competition	12	14	18	10	Ret	Ret	5	1	19	5	1	Ret	71
13	(Germany) Patrick Hirsch	(Germany) Heico Motorsport	5	8	13	9	5	10	Ret	Ret	5	Ret	4	6	57
14=	(Netherlands) Nick Catsburg	(Netherlands) Faster Racing by DB Motorsport	DNS	DNS	7	2	10	2	12	16	Ret	7	7	11	55
14=	(Netherlands) Harrie Kolen	(Netherlands) Faster Racing by DB Motorsport	DNS	DNS	7	2	10	2	12	16	Ret	7	7	11	55
15	(Slovakia) Filip Sladecka	(Germany) Heico Motorsport	5	8	13	9	5	10	Ret	Ret	5	Ret			37
16=	(France) Jérôme Demay	(France) Saintéloc Racing	11	17	14	7	9	4	3	Ret	16	11	16	17	35
16=	(France) Dino Lunardi	(France) Saintéloc Racing	11	17	14	7	9	4	3	Ret	16	11	16	17	35
17	(Switzerland) Joakim Lambotte	(France) Graff Racing	6	Ret	9	5	Ret	11	7	Ret	Ret	6			34
18	(France) Grégoire Demoustier	(France) Graff Racing					Ret	11	7	Ret	Ret	6	8	3	33
19	(Russia) Leonid Machitski	(Czech Republic) Gravity Charouz Racing	Ret	Ret	19	17	13	21	15	8	8	2	11	24	26
20	(Czech Republic) Jaroslav Janiš	(Czech Republic) Gravity Charouz Racing					13	21	15	8	8	2			26
21	(Germany) Christopher Haase	(Belgium) Belgian Audi Club Team WRT											17	1	25
22=	(Republic of Ireland) Matt Griffin	(United Kingdom) MTECH Motorsport	13	12	8	Ret	11	6	11	7	7	17	24	14	24
22=	(United Kingdom) Duncan Cameron	(United Kingdom) MTECH Motorsport	13	12	8	Ret	11	6	11	7	7	17	24	14	24
23	(Netherlands) Christiaan Frankenhout	(Germany) Heico Motorsport											4	6	20
24	(Switzerland) Gary Hirsch	(France) Graff Racing	6	Ret	9	5									20
25	(United Kingdom) Michael Lyons	(United Kingdom) MTECH Motorsport			10	Ret									19
25	(United Kingdom) Michael Lyons	(United Kingdom) Scuderia Vittoria											2	Ret	19
26	(Czech Republic) Filip Salaquarda	(United Kingdom) Scuderia Vittoria											2	Ret	18
27=	(Belgium) Jan Heylen	(Belgium) Prospeed Competition	16	9	17	12	12	8	8	Ret	9	13	Ret	7	18
27=	(Finland) Petri Lappalainen	(Belgium) Prospeed Competition	16	9	17	12	12	8	8	Ret	9	13	Ret	7	18
28=	(United Kingdom) Glynn Geddie	(Italy) AF Corse	8	Ret	Ret	4	14	18	20	Ret	13	24	14	18	16
28=	(United Kingdom) Daniel Brown	(Italy) AF Corse	8	Ret	Ret	4	14	18	20	Ret	13	24	14	18	16
29=	(Finland) Mikko Eskelinen	(Germany) Fischer Racing	7	Ret	16	13	Ret	15	10	Ret	Ret	8	DNS	DNS	11
29=	(Denmark) Christoffer Nygaard	(Germany) Fischer Racing	7	Ret	16	13	Ret	15	10	Ret	Ret	8	DNS	DNS	11
30	(Germany) Thomas Jäger	(France) Graff Racing											15	5	10
31=	(Finland) Markus Palttala	(Germany) Fischer Racing	14	Ret	23	DSQ			17	15	Ret	19	6	9	10
31=	(Finland) Jesse Krohn	(Germany) Fischer Racing											6	9	10
32	(Slovakia) Štefan Rosina	(Germany) Reiter Engineering									6	Ret			8
32	(Slovakia) Štefan Rosina	(Czech Republic) Gravity Charouz Racing											11	24	8
33	(France) Didier André	(Belgium) Belgian Audi Club Team WRT	Ret	6	24	18			16	12	Ret	23	18	Ret	8
34=	(France) David Hallyday	(Belgium) Belgian Audi Club Team WRT	Ret	6											8
34=	(Slovakia) Anton Kiaba	(Germany) Reiter Engineering									6	Ret			8
35=	(Brazil) Carlos Iaconelli	(United Kingdom) Scuderia Vittoria					8	Ret							4
35=	(Italy) Giacomo Petrobelli	(United Kingdom) Scuderia Vittoria					8	Ret							4
36=	(United States) Mark Patterson	(United States) United Autosports	Ret	18	15	14	18	14	14	9	14	14	19	21	2
36=	(United Kingdom) Joe Osborne	(United States) United Autosports	Ret	18	15	14	18	14	14	9	14	14	19	21	2
37=	(United Kingdom) Matthew Bell	(United States) United Autosports	10	10	21	16	19	20	Ret	11	12	Ret	20	20	2
37=	(United States) Zak Brown	(United States) United Autosports	10	10	21	16	19	20	Ret	11	12	Ret	20	20	2
38=	(Czech Republic) Jan Stoviček	(Czech Republic) Gravity Charouz Racing	17	16	25	19	17	19	19	13	10	20	Ret	22	1
38=	(Czech Republic) Jakub Knoll	(Czech Republic) Gravity Charouz Racing	17	16	25	19	17	19	19	13	10	20	Ret	22	1
39=	(France) Yannick Mallegol	(Italy) Ombra Racing							18	10					1
39=	(France) Jean-Marc Bachelier	(Italy) Ombra Racing							18	10					1
40	(Italy) Luca Pirri	(United Kingdom) MTECH Motorsport	Ret	DNS	10	Ret									1
41	(France) Gary Chalandon	(Belgium) Belgian Audi Club Team WRT							16	12					0
42	(France) Greg Guilvert	(France) Saintéloc Racing	18	13									21	16	0
42	(France) Greg Guilvert	(France) Team LMP Motorsport							DNS	14					0
43	(Switzerland) Pierre Hirschi	(France) Saintéloc Racing	18	13	22	20	20	16	21	EX	Ret	15	21	16	0
44	(Brazil) Paulo Bonifácio	(Germany) Fischer Racing	14	Ret											0
45	(France) Jean-Charles Miginiac	(France) Team LMP Motorsport							DNS	14					0
46=	(France) Dimitri Enjalbert	(France) Team LMP Motorsport	15	15	26	Ret									0
46=	(Belgium) Bernard Delhez	(France) Team LMP Motorsport	15	15	26	Ret									0
47	(United Kingdom) James Emmett	(Germany) Fischer Racing							17	15					0
48=	(France) Adrien Tambay	(France) Saintéloc Racing									Ret	15			0
48=	(Sweden) Max Nilsson	(Germany) Reiter Engineering											Ret	15	0
48=	(Netherlands) Henry Zumbrink	(Germany) Reiter Engineering											Ret	15	0
49	(France) Lionel Mazars	(France) Saintéloc Racing					20	16							0
50	(Czech Republic) Tomáš Kostka	(Czech Republic) Gravity Charouz Racing	Ret	Ret	19	17									0
51=	(France) Edouard Gravereaux	(Monaco) JMB Racing							Ret	17					0
51=	(France) Nicolas Marroc	(Monaco) JMB Racing							Ret	17					0
52=	(Slovakia) Jan Danis	(United Kingdom) MTECH									18	18			0
52=	(Slovakia) Zdeno Mikulasko	(United Kingdom) MTECH									18	18			0
53	(Germany) Tobias Neuser	(Belgium) Belgian Audi Club Team WRT			24	18									0
54=	(Netherlands) Dennis Van de Laar	(Netherlands) Aevitae Bleekemolen Racing											23	19	0
54=	(Netherlands) Ronald Van de Laar	(Netherlands) Aevitae Bleekemolen Racing											23	19	0
55=	(Portugal) Paulo Pinheiro	(Portugal) Paulo Pinheiro	Ret	19											0
55=	(United Kingdom) Roger Green	(Portugal) Paulo Pinheiro	Ret	19											0
55=	(Czech Republic) Martin Matzke	(Germany) Fischer Racing									Ret	19			0
56	(France) Michaël Rossi	(France) Saintéloc Racing			22	20									0
57	(France) Marc Sourd	(France) Saintéloc Racing							21	EX					0
58=	(France) Julien Briché	(France) Team Cine Cascade											22	23	0
58=	(France) Jean-Claude Lagniez	(France) Team Cine Cascade											22	23	0
59	(Slovakia) Jirko Malchárek	(Belgium) Belgian Audi Club Team WRT									Ret	23			0
60	(Belgium) Stéphane Lemeret	(Germany) Fischer Racing			23	DSQ									0
—	(United Kingdom) Paul Rees	(United Kingdom) MTECH Motorsport	Ret	DNS											0
—	(France) Jean-Charles Battut	(France) Team LMP Motorsport					Ret	DNS							0
—	(France) Frédéric Gabillon	(France) Team LMP Motorsport					Ret	DNS							0
—	(Netherlands) Nico Pronk	(Germany) Reiter Engineering							DNS	DNS					0
—	(Canada) Eugenio Amos	(Germany) Reiter Engineering							DNS	DNS					0

Key
Colour	Result
Gold	Race winner
Silver	2nd place
Bronze	3rd place
Green	Points finish
Blue	Non-points finish
Blue	Non-classified finish (NC)
Purple	Did not finish (Ret)
Black	Disqualified (DSQ)
Black	Excluded (EX)
White	Did not start (DNS)
White	Race cancelled (C)
White	Withdrew (WD)
Blank	Did not participate

==== Teams' Championship ====
Pos	Team	Manufacturer	Car	ALG (Portugal)		SIL (United Kingdom)		NAV (Spain)		PRI (France)		SLO (Slovakia)		ZAN (Netherlands)		Total
Pos	Team	Manufacturer	Car	R1	R2	R1	R2	R1	R2	R1	R2	R1	R2	R1	R2	Total
1	(Germany) Heico Motorsport	Mercedes-Benz	44	Ret	3	12	Ret	4	7	6	Ret	1	10	5	2	167
1	(Germany) Heico Motorsport	Mercedes-Benz	45	5	8	13	9	5	10	Ret	Ret	5	Ret	4	6	167
2	(Germany) Need for Speed Team Schubert	BMW	6	1	Ret	4	6	2	13	Ret	5	17	9	13	13	159
2	(Germany) Need for Speed Team Schubert	BMW	7	2	5	6	EX	15	17	Ret	6	3	3	12	10	159
3	(Netherlands) Faster Racing by DB Motorsport	BMW	35	3	11	5	1	3	9	Ret	Ret	Ret	4	10	8	151
3	(Netherlands) Faster Racing by DB Motorsport	BMW	36	DNS	DNS	7	2	10	2	12	16	Ret	7	7	11	151
4	(France) Graff Racing	Mercedes-Benz	3	4	Ret	3	8	16	3	3	Ret	11	1	8	3	149
4	(France) Graff Racing	Mercedes-Benz	4	6	Ret	9	5	Ret	11	7	Ret	Ret	6	15	5	149
5	(Italy) AF Corse	Ferrari	50	DNS	2	1	11	7	Ret	2	4	2	21	9	4	131
5	(Italy) AF Corse	Ferrari	51	8	Ret	Ret	4	14	18	20	Ret	13	24	14	18	131
6	(Belgium) Belgian Audi Club Team WRT	Audi	32	Ret	6	24	18			16	12	Ret	23	18	Ret	113
6	(Belgium) Belgian Audi Club Team WRT	Audi	33	9	1	20	Ret	6	1	13	3	15	22	17	1	113
7	(Belgium) Prospeed Competition	Porsche	1	12	14	18	10	Ret	Ret	5	1	19	5	1	Ret	95
7	(Belgium) Prospeed Competition	Porsche	2	16	9	17	12	12	8	8	Ret	9	13	Ret	7	95
8	(France) Team LMP Motorsport	Aston Martin	8	15	15	26	Ret	Ret	DNS	DNS	14					83
8	(France) Team LMP Motorsport	Aston Martin	9	7	Ret	2	3	21	5	9	2	4	12	25	Ret	83
9	(Germany) Reiter Engineering	Lamborghini	24					1	12	1	Ret	Ret	16	3	12	51
9	(Germany) Reiter Engineering	Lamborghini	25	Ret	4	11	15			DNS	DNS	6	Ret	Ret	15	51
10	(France) Saintéloc Racing	Audi	15	11	Ret	14	7	9	4	3	Ret	16	11	16	17	39
10	(France) Saintéloc Racing	Audi	16	18	13	22	20	20	16	21	EX	Ret	15	21	16	39
11	(Czech Republic) Gravity Charouz Racing	Mercedes-Benz	11	Ret	Ret	19	17	13	21	15	8	8	2	11	24	31
11	(Czech Republic) Gravity Charouz Racing	Mercedes-Benz	12	17	16	25	19	17	19	19	13	10	20	Ret	22	31
12	(Germany) Fischer Racing	Ford	13	14	Ret	23	DSQ			17	15	Ret	19	6	9	23
12	(Germany) Fischer Racing	Ford	14	7	Ret	16	13	Ret	15	10	Ret	Ret	8	DNS	DNS	23
13	(United Kingdom) MTECH Motorsport	Ferrari	20	Ret	DNS	10	Ret					18	18			11
13	(United Kingdom) MTECH Motorsport	Ferrari	21	13	12	8	Ret	11	6	11	7	7	17	24	14	11
14	(United States) United Autosports	Audi	22	Ret	18	15	14	18	14	14	9	14	14	19	21	9
14	(United States) United Autosports	Audi	23	10	10	21	16	19	20	Ret	11	12	Ret	20	20	9

Key
Colour	Result
Gold	Race winner
Silver	2nd place
Bronze	3rd place
Green	Points finish
Blue	Non-points finish
Blue	Non-classified finish (NC)
Purple	Did not finish (Ret)
Black	Disqualified (DSQ)
Black	Excluded (EX)
White	Did not start (DNS)
White	Race cancelled (C)
White	Withdrew (WD)
Blank	Did not participate
