= Yann Clairay =

French racing driver

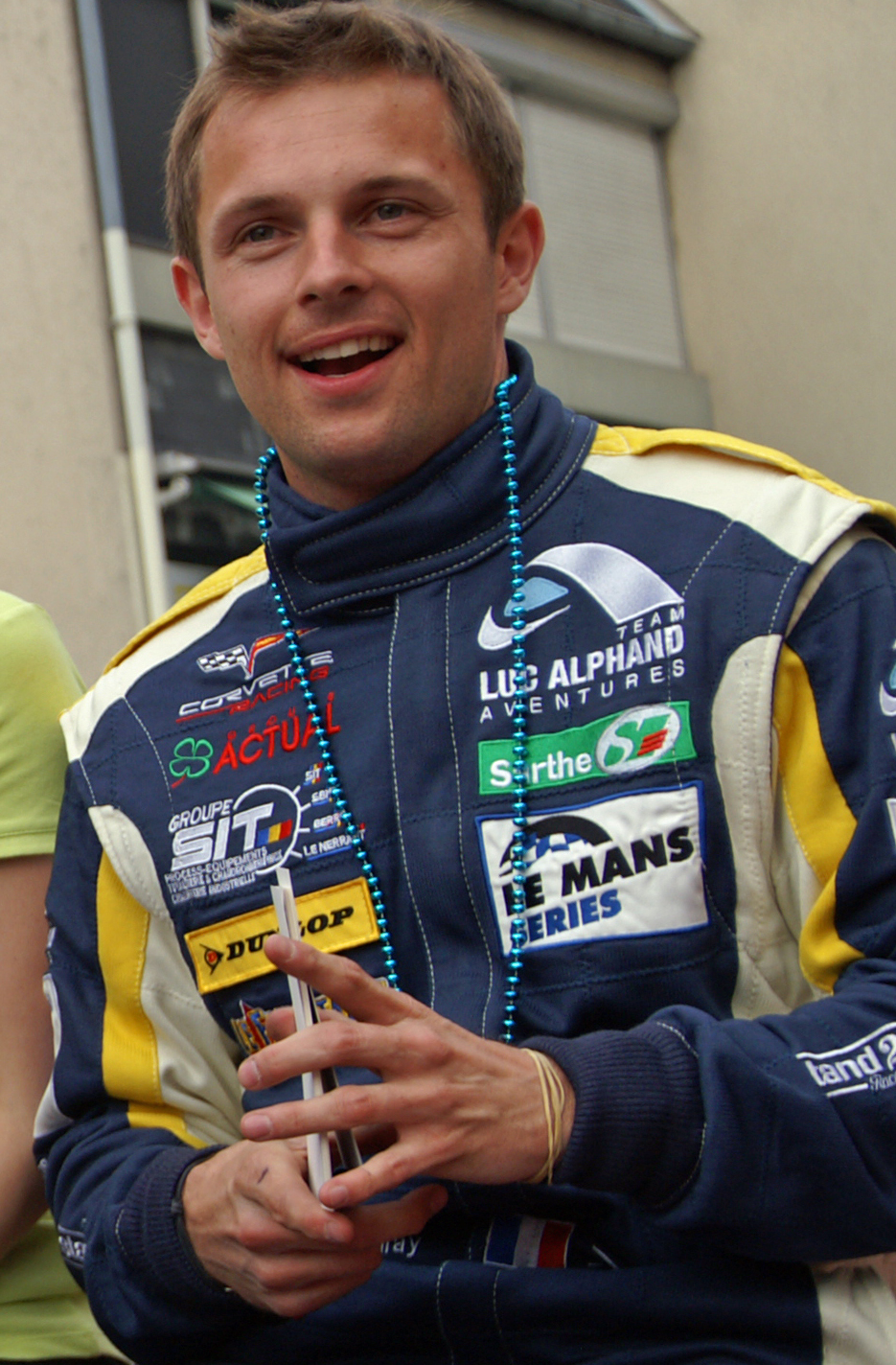
- Nationality: (France) French
- Born: Yann Dominique André Clairay; 2 December 1983 (age 42) Laval, Mayenne, France

Le Mans Series career
- Current team: Luc Alphand Aventures
- Categorisation: FIA Gold (until 2015); FIA Silver (2016–)
- Car number: 72

Yann Dominique André Clairay (born 2 December 1983 in Laval, Mayenne) is a French racing driver. He has competed in such series as Eurocup Formula Renault 2.0 and the Formula Three Euroseries. Clairay won the GT1 class of the 2009 Le Mans Series along with Patrice Goueslard.

== Racing record ==
=== Complete Eurocup Formula Renault 2.0 results ===
(key) (Races in bold indicate pole position; races in italics indicate fastest lap)

Year	Entrant	1	2	3	4	5	6	7	8	9	10	11	12	13	14	15	16	DC	Points
2005	SG Formula	ZOL; 1; 17	ZOL; 2; 4	VAL; 1; 4	VAL; 2; 28	**LMS**; **1**; 2	**LMS**; **2**; 1	BIL; 1; 2	BIL; 2 Ret	**OSC**; **1**; 2	OSC; 2; 2	DON; 1 Ret	DON; 2; 19	EST; 1; 3	**EST**; **2**; 1	MNZ; 1; 11	**MNZ**; **2**; 1	3rd	125
2006	SG Formula	ZOL; 1	ZOL; 2	IST; 1	IST; 2	MIS; 1	MIS; 2	NÜR; 1	NÜR; 2	DON; 1	DON; 2	LMS; 1; 26	LMS; 2; 2	CAT; 1	CAT; 2			NC†	0

† As Clairay was a guest driver, he was ineligible for points

=== 24 Hours of Le Mans results ===
Year	Team	Co-Drivers	Car	Class	Laps	Pos.	Class Pos.
2006	(France) Paul Belmondo Racing	(France) Patrice Roussel (France) Didier André	Courage C65-Ford	LMP2	48	DNF	DNF
2009	(France) Luc Alphand Aventures	(Netherlands) Xavier Maassen (France) Julien Jousse	Chevrolet Corvette C6.R	GT1	336	16th	**2nd**

=== Complete GT1 World Championship results ===
Year	Team	Car	1	2	3	4	5	6	7	8	9	10	11	12	13	14	15	16	17	18	19	20	Pos	Points
2010	Hexis AMR	Aston Martin	ABU; QR	ABU; CR	SIL; QR	SIL; CR	BRN; QR	BRN; CR	PRI; QR	PRI; CR	SPA; QR	SPA; CR	NÜR; QR; Ret	NÜR; CR; 7	ALG; QR; 10	ALG; CR; 6	NAV; QR; 9	NAV; CR; 2	INT; QR; 15	INT; CR; 13	SAN; QR; 1	SAN; CR; 1	10th	65
2011	Marc VDS Racing Team	Ford	ABU; QR	ABU; CR	ZOL; QR	ZOL; CR	ALG; QR; 6	ALG; CR; Ret													SAN; QR; 15	SAN; CR; 11	32nd	2
2011	Belgian Racing	Ford							SAC; QR; 13	SAC; CR; 10	SIL; QR	SIL; CR	NAV; QR; Ret	NAV; CR; Ret	PRI; QR; Ret	PRI; CR; Ret	ORD; QR; 13	ORD; CR; 11	BEI; QR; Ret	BEI; CR; Ret			32nd	2
