= Christian Hohenadel =

German race car driver (born 1976)

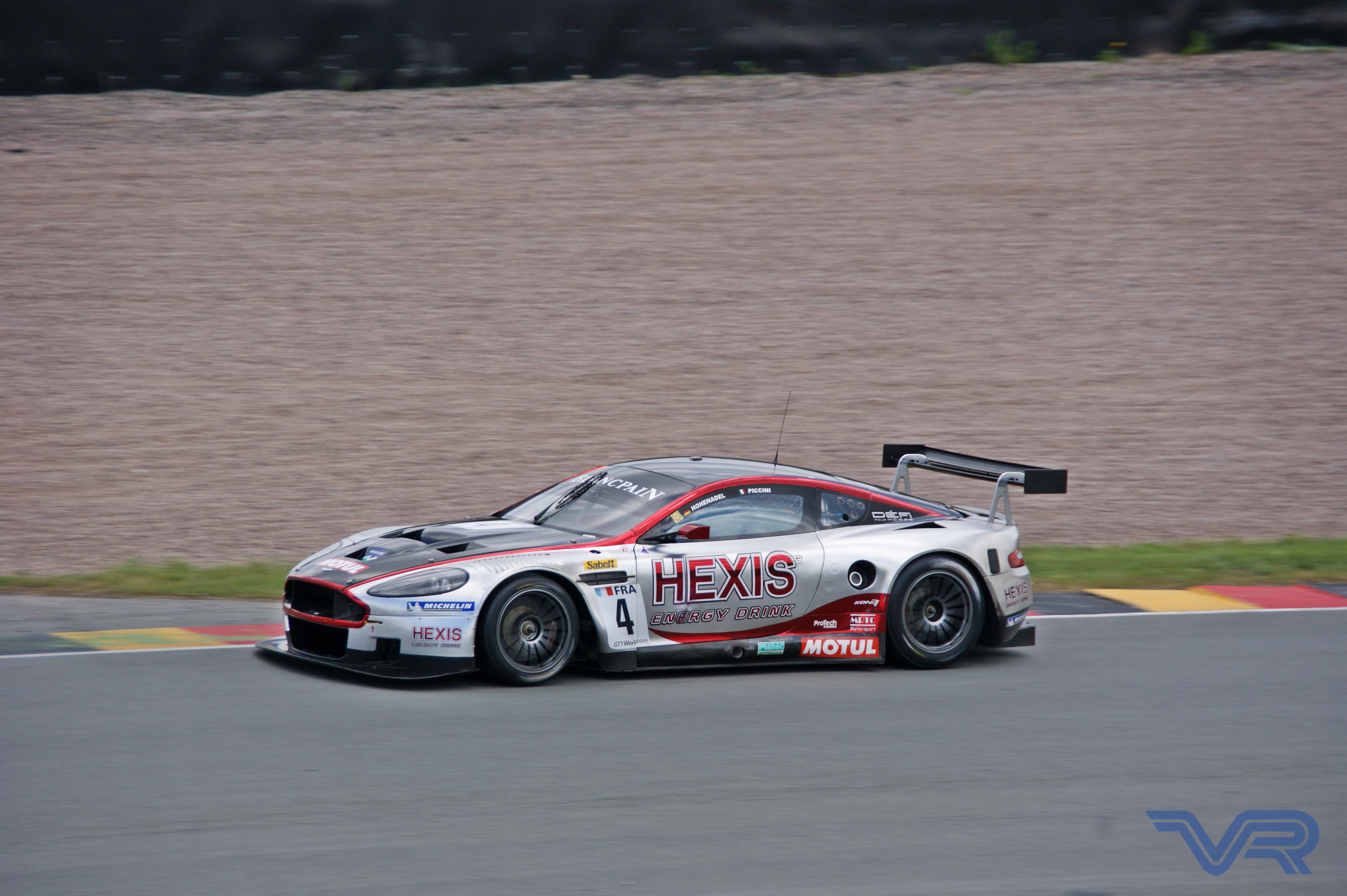
- Hohenadel in 2011
- Nationality: (Germany) German
- Born: 20 September 1976 (age 50) Dudweiler, Germany
- Categorisation: FIA Gold (until 2019); FIA Silver (2020–)

Christian Hohenadel (born 20 September 1976 in Dudweiler) is a German former racing driver. In 2019, Hohenadel joined the senior management of Winward Racing as the team prepared to expand its Mercedes-AMG GT3 program in North America.

Together with Daniel Keilwitz, Hohenadel won four races and the drivers championship of the 2010 FIA GT3 championship, driving a Callaway Corvette Z06.R GT3.

In the 2011 FIA GT1 World Championship season, Hohenadel and Andrea Piccini compete for Hexis AMR in an Aston Martin DBR9. They won the fourth event, at the German Sachsenring.

On the Nürburgring, Hohenadel was part of the Audi TT RS team that set the first VLN pole with a FWD car on 27 August 2011.

Hohenadel was a Mercedes-AMG factory driver from 2015 until his retirement in 2019, and soon after took on the role of team principal at HTP Winward Motorsport.

== Career ==
- 1987–1996: Kart
- 1993: Deutsche Formula BMW
- 1997: Deutsche Formel BMW
- 1998: Deutsche Formula Ford
- 1999: Deutsche Formel Ford (8th)
- 2000: Formula Palmer Audi
- 2001: V8Star Series (22nd)
- 2002: V8Star Series (Platz 19)
- 2003: Deutscher Alfa 147 Cup (3rd)
- 2004: Deutscher Alfa 147 Cup
- 2005: Deutscher SEAT Leon Supercopa (5th)
- 2006: Deutscher SEAT Leon Supercopa (5th)
- 2007: Deutscher SEAT Leon Supercopa (7th)
- 2007: ADAC GT Masters (17th)
- 2008: ADAC GT Masters (5th)
- 2009: ADAC GT Masters (4th)
- 2009 FIA GT3 European Championship season
- 2010 FIA GT3 European Championship season: champion
- 2010: ADAC GT Masters (14th)
- 2011 FIA GT1 World Championship season

=== Complete GT1 World Championship results ===
Year	Team	Car	1	2	3	4	5	6	7	8	9	10	11	12	13	14	15	16	17	18	19	20	Pos	Points
2011	Hexis AMR	Aston Martin	ABU; QR; 9	ABU; CR; 4	ZOL; QR; 10	ZOL; CR; 2	ALG; QR; 11	ALG; CR; 8	SAC; QR; 5	SAC; CR; 1	SIL; QR; 10	SIL; CR; Ret	NAV; QR; 5	NAV; CR; 5	PRI; QR; 6	PRI; CR; 5	ORD; QR; 8	ORD; CR; 4	BEI; QR; 3	BEI; CR; 10	SAN; QR; 14	SAN; CR; 5	3rd	111

Sporting positions
Preceded by Christopher Haase; Christopher Mies	FIA GT3 European Champion; 2010 with: Daniel Keilwitz	Succeeded by Federico Leo; Francesco Castellacci
