= Ballast (car racing) =

Ballast weights may be added to a race car to alter its performance. In most racing series, cars have a minimum weight. Often, the actual weight of the car is lower, so ballast is used to bring it up to the minimum. The advantage is that the ballast can be positioned to affect the car's handling by changing its weight distribution. This is near-universal in Formula 1. It is also common in other racing series that ballast may only be located in certain positions on the car.

In some racing series, for example the British Touring Car Championship, ballast was used as a handicap, the leading drivers at the end of one race being given more ballast for the next race.
