= Christoffer Nygaard =

Danish racing driver

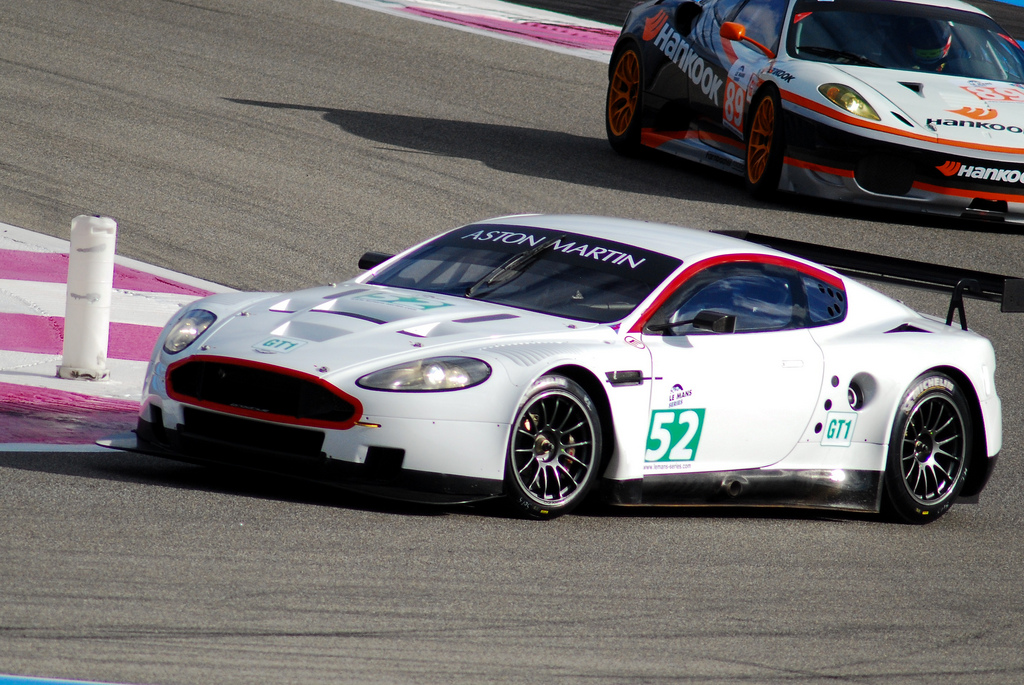
- Nationality: (Denmark) Danish
- Born: 24 March 1986 (age 40) Gentofte, Denmark

FIA World Endurance Championship career
- Debut season: 2012
- Current team: Aston Martin Racing
- Categorisation: FIA Silver (until 2014); FIA Gold (2015–)
- Car number: 95

Previous series
- 2001–2004 2005–2006 2007–2008 2009, 2012 2009-2011 2010-2011: Karting; ADAC Volkswagen Polo Cup; SEAT Leon Supercopa Germany; ADAC GT Masters; FIA GT3 European Championship; FIA GT1 World Championship
24 Hours of Le Mans career
- Years: 2010, 2012-
- Teams: Young Driver AMR, Aston Martin Racing
- Best finish: 3rd (2010)

Christoffer Nygaard (born 24 March 1986, in Gentofte) is a Danish auto racing driver who drove in the FIA World Endurance Championship.

== Racing career ==
=== Karting ===
Nygaard started his karting career in 2001. His best result while karting was third in the Nordic Formula A Championship in his last season in 2004.

=== Touring Car racing ===
After karting for four years, Nygaard made his auto racing debut in 2005 in the German ADAC Volkswagen Polo Cup. After racing in the ADAC Volkswagen Polo Cup from 2005 to 2006, Nygaard switched to SEAT Leon Supercopa Germany for the 2007 season, racing for Fischer Racing. In 2008, he finished third in the championship.

=== GT racing ===
For 2009, Nygaard switched from the SEAT Leon Supercopa to a Ford GT GT3, still driving for Fischer Racing, in ADAC GT Masters and the FIA GT3 European Championship. He continued in FIA GT3 for 2010 and debuted in the FIA GT1 World Championship and the 24 Hours of Le Mans the same year. Nygaard continued racing in the FIA GT3 and FIA GT1 for 2011.

In 2012, Nygaard returned to ADAC GT Masters. Since 2012, he has been racing in the FIA World Endurance Championship for Aston Martin Racing.

== Racing record ==
=== 24 Hours of Le Mans results ===
Year	Team	Co-Drivers	Car	Class	Laps	Pos.	Class Pos.
2010	(Germany) Young Driver AMR	(Czech Republic) Tomáš Enge (Netherlands) Peter Kox	Aston Martin DBR9	GT1	311	22nd	3rd
2012	(United Kingdom) Aston Martin Racing	(Denmark) Kristian Poulsen (Denmark) Allan Simonsen	Aston Martin Vantage GTE	GTE; Am	31	DNF	DNF
2013	(United Kingdom) Aston Martin Racing	(Denmark) Kristian Poulsen (Denmark) Allan Simonsen†	Aston Martin Vantage GTE	GTE; Am	2	DNF†	DNF†
2014	(United Kingdom) Aston Martin Racing	(Canada) Paul Dalla Lana (Portugal) Pedro Lamy	Aston Martin Vantage GTE	GTE; Am	329	26th	6th
2015	(United Kingdom) Aston Martin Racing	(Denmark) Nicki Thiim (Denmark) Marco Sørensen	Aston Martin Vantage GTE	GTE; Pro	330	27th	4th

†Simonsen was killed on Lap 3 of the race. Neither Poulsen nor Nygaard had driven in the race at the time of the crash.

=== Complete FIA World Endurance Championship results ===
Year	Entrant	Class	Chassis	Engine	1	2	3	4	5	6	7	8	Rank	Points
2012	Aston Martin Racing	LMGTE Am	Aston Martin Vantage GTE	Aston Martin 4.5 L V8	SEB	SPA	LMS; Ret	SIL	SÃO	BHR	FUJ	SHA	NC	0
2013	Aston Martin Racing	LMGTE Am	Aston Martin Vantage GTE	Aston Martin 4.5 L V8	SIL; 1	SPA; 2	LMS; Ret	SÃO; Ret	COA; 2	FUJ; 1	SHA; Ret	BHR; 1	4th	104.5
2014	Aston Martin Racing	LMGTE Am	Aston Martin Vantage GTE	Aston Martin 4.5 L V8	SIL; 2	SPA; 3	LMS; 5	COA; 1	FUJ; 2	SHA; 1	BHR; 3	SÃO; 1	2nd	164
2015	Aston Martin Racing	LMGTE Pro	Aston Martin Vantage GTE	Aston Martin 4.5 L V8	SIL; 4	SPA; 6	LMS; 6	NÜR; 4	COA; 5	FUJ; 5	SHA	BHR; 4	8th	81

== Coaching ==
Nygaard is currently an instructor at Power Racing Gokart Academy in Herlev, Denmark, where he runs the Race Club, a regularly held class where he provides coaching services to novice and advanced Gokart drivers.
