= Swiss Racing Team =

(Switzerland) Swiss Racing Team
- Founded: 2000
- Team principal(s): Othmar Welti; Erich Kolb
- Former series: German Formula Three Championship; Formula 3 Euro Series; FIA GT1 World Championship
- Drivers' Championships: German Formula 3: 2008: Frédéric Vervisch

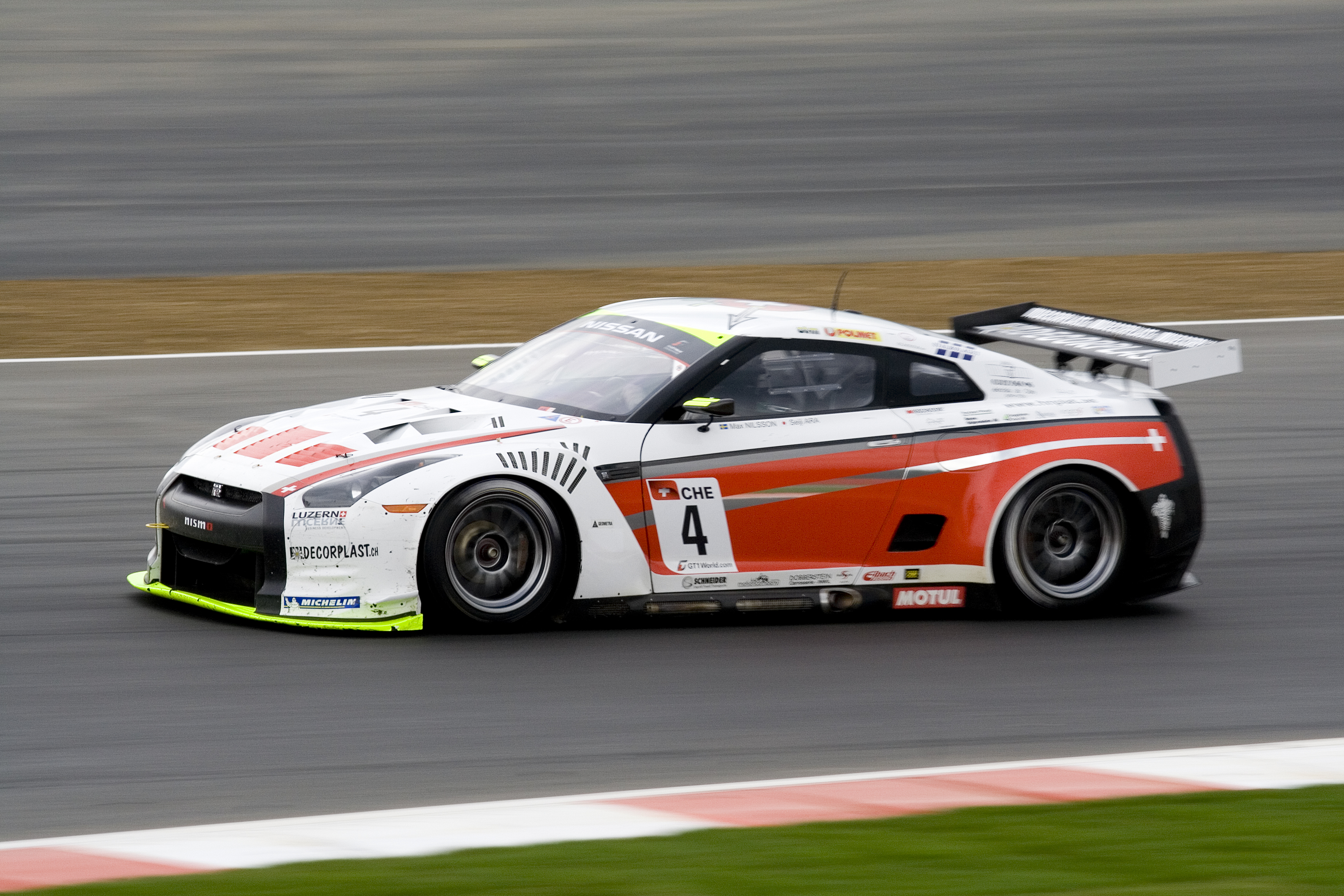
A Nissan GT-R entered by Swiss Racing Team in the 2010 FIA GT1 World Championship

Swiss Racing Team (SRT) is an auto racing team based in Inwil, Lucerne, Switzerland. Formed by Othmar Welti and Erich Kolb in 2000, Swiss Racing Team initially competed in the German Formula Three Championship before also joining the Formula Three Euroseries from 2003 to 2004. Frédéric Vervisch won the German Championship in 2008 earning SRT their only championship. In 2007, the team also explored grand tourer racing, providing technical aid to Jetalliance Racing and KplusK Motorsport in the FIA GT Championship.

In 2010 Swiss Racing Team entered a partnership with Nissan to be one of two teams to race the Nissan GT-R in the inaugural FIA GT1 World Championship. SRT's drivers for the World Championship include Karl Wendlinger, former FIA GT Championship race winner with both Jetalliance and KplusK, former SRT Formula Three driver Max Nilsson, Le Mans winner Seiji Ara, and Henri Moser.

In 2011, the team announced they will be racing a pair of Lamborghini Murciélago's for the upcoming season, replacing the Nissan GT-R's. Karl Wendlinger and Max Nilsson are currently the only confirmed drivers to be signed with SRT for their upcoming 2011 programme.

== Former series results ==
=== Formula 3 Euro Series ===
Formula 3 Euro Series
Year	Car	Drivers	Races	Wins	Poles	F/Laps	Points	D.C.
2003	Dallara F302-Opel	(Switzerland) Gilles Tinguely	5	0	0	0	0	33rd
2003	Dallara F302-Opel	(Portugal) César Campaniço	14	0	0	0	13	16th†
2003	Dallara F302-Opel	(Australia) James Manderson	8	0	0	0	0	29th
2003	Dallara F302-Opel	(Italy) Stefano Proetto	4	0	0	0	0	30th
2003	Dallara F302-Opel	(Germany) Marcel Lasée	8	0	0	0	3	23rd
2004	Dallara F302-Opel	(Brazil) Fernando Rees	2	0	0	0	0	NC
2004	Dallara F302-Opel	(Germany) Peter Elkmann	12	0	0	0	0	30th
2004	Dallara F302-Opel	(Germany) Dennis Furchheim	4	0	0	0	5	18th
2004	Dallara F302-Opel	(Spain) Alejandro Núñez	10	0	0	0	0	31st

† Shared results with Signature Plus

=== German Formula 3 ===
German Formula 3
Year	Car	Drivers	Races	Wins	Poles	F/Laps	Points	D.C.
2000	Dallara F399-Opel	(Switzerland) Giorgio Mecattaf	18	0	0	0	2	27th
2000	Dallara F399-Opel	(Italy) Armin Pörnbacher	17	0	0	0	16	19th
2001	Dallara F399-Opel	(United Kingdom) Andrew Kirkaldy	2	0	0	0	3	27th
2001	Dallara F399-Opel	(Finland) Kari Mäenpää	16	0	0	0	32	16th
2001	Dallara F399-Opel	(Switzerland) Gilles Tinguely	2	0	0	0	0	40th
2001	Dallara F399-Opel	(Brazil) João Paulo de Oliveira	20	1	3	1	116	7th
2002	Dallara F302-Opel	(Austria) Norbert Siedler	18	1	0	0	28	6th
2002	Dallara F302-Opel	(Switzerland) Marc Benz	13	0	0	0	0	23rd
2002	Dallara F302-Opel	(Italy) Stefano Proetto	4	0	0	0	0	30th
2002	Dallara F302-Opel	(Switzerland) Gilles Tinguely	18	0	0	0	0	29th
2005	Dallara F302-Opel	(Germany) Dominik Schraml	16	0	0	0	7	13th
2005	Dallara F302-Opel	(Switzerland) Radi Müller	10	0	0	0	0	37th
2006	Dallara F305-Opel	(Germany) Dominik Schraml	4	0	0	0	8	16th
2006	Dallara F305-Opel	(Sweden) Max Nilsson	12	0	0	0	0	30th
2006	Dallara F305-Opel; Dallara F302-Opel	(Japan) Hiroyuki Matsumura	6	0	0	0	3	21st
2006	SLC R1-Opel	(Brazil) Marcello Thomaz	14	0	0	0	17	12th
2006	Dallara F302-Opel	(Germany) Michael Klein [T]	6	0	0	0	18	9th [T]
2007	Dallara F305-OPC-Challenge	(Sweden) Max Nilsson	16	0	0	0	15	8th
2007	Dallara F305-OPC-Challenge	(Switzerland) Patrick Cicchiello	4	0	0	0	3	14th
2007	Dallara F305-OPC-Challenge	(Brazil) Marcello Thomaz	2	0	0	0	6	13th
2007	Dallara F305-OPC-Challenge	(Netherlands) Dominick Muermans	9	0	0	0	12	10th
2008	Dallara F306-Mercedes	(Latvia) Karline Stala	6	0	0	0	0	17th†
2008	Dallara F305-OPC-Challenge	(Sweden) Max Nilsson	17	0	0	0	20	10th
2008	Dallara F305-OPC-Challenge	(Belgium) Frédéric Vervisch	10	1	0	2	120	1st†
2008	Dallara F305-OPC-Challenge	(Finland) Tomi Limmonen [G]	2	0	0	0	0	NC‡
2009	Dallara F305-OPC-Challenge	(Sweden) Max Nilsson	18	0	0	0	30	10th

† – Shared results with other teams ‡ – As Limmonen was a guest driver, he was ineligible for points.

=== British Formula 3 ===
British Formula 3
Year	Car	Drivers	Races	Wins	Poles	F/Laps	Points	D.C.
2007	Dallara F305-OPC-Challenge	(Netherlands) Dominick Muermans	2	0	0	0	0	NC‡

‡ – As Muermans was a guest driver, he was ineligible for points.
