= Fabien Giroix =

French racing driver (born 1960)

- Nationality: (France) French
- Born: 17 September 1960 (age 66) Saint-Maur-des-Fossés, France
- Categorisation: FIA Gold (until 2012); FIA Silver (2013–2015); FIA Bronze (2016–)
24 Hours of Le Mans career
- Years: 1995 – 1996, 2011 – 2013
- Teams: Giroix Racing Team; Kokusai Kaihatsu Racing; Gulf AMR Middle East
- Best finish: 5th (1995)
- Class wins: 0

Fabien Giroix (born 17 September 1960) is a French racing driver from Saint-Maur-des-Fossés, Paris.

== Racing career ==
=== Formula cars ===
Giroix began his career in French Formula Renault in 1984, finishing fourth. In 1985, he drove in the French Formula Three Championship and finished 12th. In 1986, he only participated in a handful of Formula 3 races in the British and German series. In 1987, he drove in two major F3 races (Monaco and Macau) and made his World Touring Car Championship and made his DTM debut in an Alpina BMW M3. In 1988, he drove in the first five races of the International Formula 3000 season for Sport Auto Racing, starting second and finishing fourth in his first start at Circuito de Jerez. The points from that race were good enough for 17th in the championship.

=== Touring cars ===
In 1989, Giroix joined the DTM circuit full-time driving a BMW M3 for Schnitzer Motorsport, finishing third in points with ten podium finishes in 21 starts. He also drove in the 24 Hours of Nürburgring and with teammates Emanuele Pirro and Roberto Ravaglia won the race in their Team Bigazzi BMW M3. In 1990, he dropped to ninth in points for the same team but won the Spa 24 Hours with teammates Johnny Cecotto and Markus Oestreich. In 1991, he made ten starts for Zakspeed in their Mercedes 190E Evo, finishing 23rd in points.

In 1992, Giroix drove in the French Supertouring Championship in a Garage du BAC BMW M3 and finished fourth in points. In 1993, he got a factory drive in a Seat Toledo for seven races and finished 16th in points. He also finished third in the Porsche Carrera Cup France. That same year, he returned to the Seat factory team full-time in French Supertouring and finished 11th as well as finishing sixth in French Carrera Cup.

=== Sports cars ===
In 1995, Giroix moved to high-level sports car racing with his own Giroix Racing Team that campaigned a McLaren F1 GTR in the BPR Global GT Series, where he finished on the podium twice in five starts and competed in his first 24 Hours of Le Mans where his team finished fifth overall and fourth in class in a race uncharacteristically dominated by GT1-class McLaren F1 GTR's. In 1996 he split his time in Global GT between his own GTR and a factory Lotus Esprit. The Giroix McLaren F1 GTR failed to finish at Le Mans in 1996. In 1997, Giroix's team became the factory-backed outfit for the Lotus Elise GT1 in the FIA GT Championship but the season was not successful. In 1998, he only made one start in a Zakspeed Porsche 911 in FIA GT. Giroix drove in a handful of sports car races throughout most of the 2000s before resurfacing in the Speedcar Series in 2008, where he competed in all eight races and finished tenth in points. As of 2010, he remains an active driver, having made four starts in a Lamborghini Gallardo in the French GT Championship.

== Racing record ==
=== Complete Deutsche Tourenwagen Meisterschaft results ===
(key) (Races in bold indicate pole position) (Races in italics indicate fastest lap)

| Year | Team | Car | 1 | 2 | 3 | 4 | 5 | 6 | 7 | 8 | 9 | 10 | 11 | 12 | 13 | 14 | 15 | 16 | 17 | 18 | 19 | 20 | 21 | 22 | 23 | 24 | Pos. | Pts |
|---|---|---|---|---|---|---|---|---|---|---|---|---|---|---|---|---|---|---|---|---|---|---|---|---|---|---|---|---|
| 1987 | BMW Alpina | BMW M3 | HOC | ZOL | NÜR | AVU | MFA | NOR | NÜR; 2 | WUN | DIE; 1 | SAL | | | | | | | | | | | | | | | 16th | 40 |
| 1989 | BMW M Team Schnitzer | BMW M3 Evo | ZOL; 1; 2 | ZOL; 2; 2 | HOC; 1; 9 | HOC; 2; 4 | NÜR; 1; 2 | NÜR; 2; 2 | MFA; 1; 8 | MFA; 2 Ret | AVU; 1; 10 | AVU; 2; 2 | NÜR; 1; 10 | NÜR; 2; 8 | NOR; 1; 6 | NOR; 2; 3 | HOC; 1; 8 | HOC; 2; 3 | DIE; 1; 3 | DIE; 2; 3 | NÜR; 1; 7 | NÜR; 2; 7 | HOC; 1; 11 | HOC; 2; 3 | | | 3rd | 265 |
| 1990 | BMW M Team Schnitzer | BMW M3 Sport Evo | ZOL; 1; 3 | ZOL; 2 Ret | HOC; 1; 5 | HOC; 2; 8 | NÜR; 1; 5 | NÜR; 2; 2 | AVU; 1; 7 | AVU; 2; 3 | MFA; 1 Ret | MFA; 2; 21 | WUN; 1; 8 | WUN; 2; 6 | NÜR; 1 Ret | NÜR; 2 DNS | NOR; 1; 7 | NOR; 2; 7 | DIE; 1; 3 | DIE; 2; 18 | NÜR; 1; 12 | NÜR; 2; 8 | HOC; 1; 12 | HOC; 2 DNS | | | 9th | 94 |
| 1991 | Zakspeed Racing | Mercedes 190 E 2.5–16 Evo II | ZOL; 1; 11 | ZOL; 2; 9 | HOC; 1 Ret | HOC; 2; 8 | NÜR; 1 Ret | NÜR; 2; 17 | AVU; 1; 17 | AVU; 2; 19 | WUN; 1; 11 | WUN; 2; 12 | NOR; 1 | NOR; 2 | DIE; 1 | DIE; 2 | NÜR; 1 | NÜR; 2 | ALE; 1 | ALE; 2 | HOC; 1 | HOC; 2 | BRN; 1 | BRN; 2 | DON; 1 | DON; 2 | 23rd | 5 |

=== Complete International Formula 3000 results ===
(key) (Races in bold indicate pole position; races in italics indicate fastest lap.)

| Year | Entrant | Chassis | Engine | 1 | 2 | 3 | 4 | 5 | 6 | 7 | 8 | 9 | 10 | 11 | Pos. | Pts |
|---|---|---|---|---|---|---|---|---|---|---|---|---|---|---|---|---|
| 1988 | Sport Auto Racing | Lola T88/50 | Cosworth | JER; 4 | VAL; 17 | PAU; 8 | SIL; Ret | MNZ; Ret | PER | BRH | BIR | BUG | ZOL | DIJ | 17th | 3 |

=== 24 Hours of Le Mans results ===
| Year | Team | Co-Drivers | Car | Class | Laps | Pos. | Class Pos. |
|---|---|---|---|---|---|---|---|
| 1995 | (France) Giroix Racing Team | (Switzerland) Jean-Denis Délétraz (France) Olivier Grouillard | McLaren F1 GTR | GT1 | 290 | 5th | 4th |
| 1996 | (United Kingdom) Kokusai Kaihatsu Racing (France) Giroix Racing Team | (Switzerland) Jean-Denis Délétraz (Brazil) Maurizio Sandro Sala | McLaren F1 GTR | GT1 | 146 | DNF | DNF |
| 1997 | (United Kingdom) GT1 Lotus Racing | (Switzerland) Jean-Denis Délétraz (Thailand) Ratanakul Prutirat | Lotus Elise GT1-Chevrolet | GT1 | – | DNQ | DNQ |
| 2011 | (United Arab Emirates) Gulf AMR Middle East | (Germany) Roald Goethe (United Kingdom) Michael Wainwright | Aston Martin V8 Vantage GT2 | GTE; Am | 141 | DNF | DNF |
| 2012 | (United Arab Emirates) Gulf Racing Middle East | (France) Ludovic Badey (Sweden) Stefan Johansson | Lola B12/80-Nissan | LMP2 | 92 | DNF | DNF |
| 2013 | (United Arab Emirates) Gulf Racing Middle East | (France) Philippe Haezebrouck (Japan) Keiko Ihara | Lola B12/80-Nissan | LMP2 | 22 | DNF | DNF |

=== Complete FIA GT Championship results ===
(key) (Races in bold indicate pole position) (Races in italics indicate fastest lap)

| Year | Team | Car | Class | 1 | 2 | 3 | 4 | 5 | 6 | 7 | 8 | 9 | 10 | 11 | Pos. | Pts |
|---|---|---|---|---|---|---|---|---|---|---|---|---|---|---|---|---|
| 1997 | GT1 Lotus Racing | Lotus Elise GT1 | GT1 | HOC; Ret | SIL; Ret | HEL; 12 | NÜR; Ret | SPA; 8 | A1R; Ret | SUZ; Ret | DON; Ret | MUG | SEB; Ret | LAG; Ret | NC | 0 |
| 1998 | Zakspeed Racing | Porsche 911 GT1-98 | GT1 | OSC | SIL | HOC | DIJ | HUN | SUZ; 8 | DON | A1R | HOM | LAG | | NC | 0 |
| 2000 | First Racing | Ferrari 550 Maranello | GT | VAL; Ret | EST | MNZ; Ret | SIL | HUN | ZOL; Ret | A1R | LAU | BRN; Ret | MAG; Ret | | NC | 0 |

=== Complete GT1 World Championship results ===
| Year | Team | Car | 1 | 2 | 3 | 4 | 5 | 6 | 7 | 8 | 9 | 10 | 11 | 12 | 13 | 14 | 15 | 16 | 17 | 18 | 19 | 20 | Pos. | Pts |
|---|---|---|---|---|---|---|---|---|---|---|---|---|---|---|---|---|---|---|---|---|---|---|---|---|
| 2011 | Belgian Racing | Ford | ABU; QR; 14 | ABU; CR; Ret | ZOL; QR | ZOL; CR | ALG; QR | ALG; CR | SAC; QR | SAC; CR | SIL; QR | SIL; CR | NAV; QR | NAV; CR | PRI; QR | PRI; CR | ORD; QR | ORD; CR | BEI; QR | BEI; CR | SAN; QR | SAN; CR | 41st | 0 |

=== Complete FIA World Endurance Championship results ===
(key) (Races in bold indicate pole position; races in italics indicate fastest lap)

| Year | Entrant | Class | Car | Engine | 1 | 2 | 3 | 4 | 5 | 6 | 7 | 8 | Pos. | Pts |
|---|---|---|---|---|---|---|---|---|---|---|---|---|---|---|
| 2012 | Gulf Racing Middle East | LMP2 | Lola B12/80 | Nissan VK45DE 4.5 V8 | SEB; 22 | SPA; 10 | LMS; Ret | SIL; 15 | SÃO; 24 | BHR; Ret | FUJ; 13 | SHA; Ret | 60th | 3 |
| 2013 | Gulf Racing Middle East | LMP2 | Lola B12/80 | Nissan VK45DE 4.5 V8 | SIL | SPA; 9 | LMS; Ret | SÃO | COA | FUJ | SHA | | 17th | 16 |
| 2013 | Delta-ADR | LMP2 | Oreca 03 | Nissan VK45DE 4.5 V8 | | | | | | | | BHR; 6 | 17th | 16 |

=== Complete WeatherTech SportsCar Championship results ===
(key) (Races in bold indicate pole position) (Races in italics indicate fastest lap)

| Year | Team | Class | Make | Engine | 1 | 2 | 3 | 4 | 5 | 6 | 7 | 8 | 9 | 10 | 11 | Pos. | Pts |
|---|---|---|---|---|---|---|---|---|---|---|---|---|---|---|---|---|---|
| 2014 | Action Express Racing | P | Coyote Corvette DP | Chevrolet 5.5L V8 | DAY; 3 | SEB | LBH | LAG | DET | WGL | MOS | IMS | ROA | COA | PET | 43rd | 31 |
