= Nico Verdonck =

Belgian racing driver (born 1985)

Nicolas Verdonck
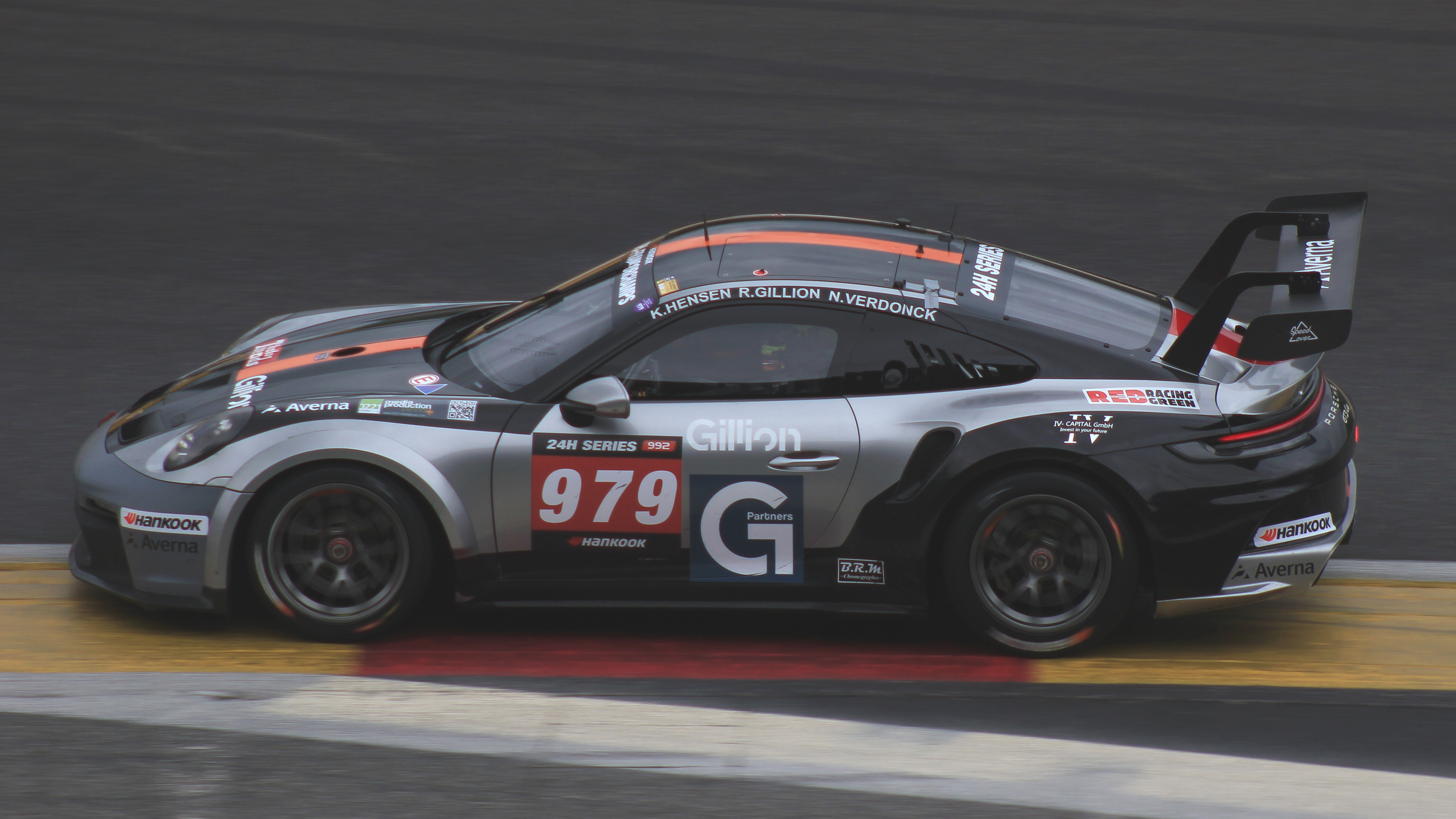
- Nationality: (Belgium) Belgian
- Born: Nicolas Blanca Joseph Mathilde Verdonck; 5 December 1985 (age 40) Brussels, Belgium

Formula Le Mans Cup career
- Debut season: 2009
- Current team: DAMS
- Categorisation: FIA Gold (until 2015); FIA Silver (2016–)
- Car number: 8
- Starts: 12
- Wins: 8
- Poles: 1
- Fastest laps: 1
- Best finish: 1st in 2009

Previous series
- 2008 2008 2007 2006 2005 2004: Italian Formula Three; Belgian GT Championship; German Formula Three; Spanish Formula Three; Formula Three Euroseries; International Formula 3000

Championship titles
- 2009: Formula Le Mans Cup

Nicolas Blanca Joseph Mathilde Verdonck (born 5 December 1985) is a Belgian racing driver. He was born in Brussels.

== Career ==
=== Formula Renault ===
Verdonck competed in Formula Renault 1600 in 2003, his first year in single seaters. His race engineer was Tim Wright.

=== Formula 3000 ===
Verdonck rose to prominence when he competed in the 2004 International Formula 3000 season with the Astromega team. Although the step up in power and downforce from FRenault to F3000 is a big one, Verdonck was given a degree of stability by the fact that he kept Wright as his race engineer. However, he only scored one point, which was not enough to get him a drive in the new GP2 Series for 2005. After his home race at Circuit de Spa-Francorchamps, he won a competition for the best driving style.

=== Formula Three ===
Verdonck took a step back in 2005, competing part-time in the Formula Three Euroseries without scoring any points. He also took part in the Masters of Formula 3 race. In 2006, he competed in two races in the Spanish Formula Three series, and then moved to the German Formula Three Championship for 2007, where he finished third overall. He moved country again in 2008, driving in the Italian Formula Three Championship.

=== Formula Le Mans Cup ===
For 2009, Verdonck switched disciplines to sports car racing by competing in the inaugural season of the Formula Le Mans Cup. He shared a DAMS-run car with Gavin Cronje and won the drivers' championship.

== Racing record ==
=== Complete International Formula 3000 results ===
(key) (Races in bold indicate pole position; races in italics indicate fastest lap.)

Year	Entrant	1	2	3	4	5	6	7	8	9	10	DC	Points
2004	Team Astromega	IMO; 15	CAT; 9	MON; 12	NÜR; 12	MAG; 11	SIL; 12	HOC; 8	HUN; 12	SPA; 11	MNZ	15th	1

=== Complete GT1 World Championship results ===
Year	Team	Car	1	2	3	4	5	6	7	8	9	10	11	12	13	14	15	16	17	18	19	20	Pos	Points
2010	Triple H Team Hegersport	Maserati	ABU; QR	ABU; CR	SIL; QR	SIL; CR	BRN; QR	BRN; CR	PRI; QR	PRI; CR	SPA; QR; 4	SPA; CR; 8	NÜR; QR	NÜR; CR	ALG; QR	ALG; CR	NAV; QR; 2	NAV; CR; 11	INT; QR	INT; CR	SAN; QR; 8	SAN; CR; Ret	36th	10
2011	Exim Bank Team China	Corvette	ABU; QR	ABU; CR	ZOL; QR	ZOL; CR	ALG; QR	ALG; CR	SAC; QR	SAC; CR	SIL; QR	SIL; CR	NAV; QR; Ret	NAV; CR; Ret	PRI; QR	PRI; CR	ORD; QR	ORD; CR	BEI; QR; 8	BEI; CR; 5	SAN; QR; 11	SAN; CR; Ret	27th	10

Sporting positions
Preceded by Inaugural season	Formula Le Mans Cup; Drivers' Champion; 2009	Succeeded by Incumbent
