= Vanina Ickx =

Belgian racing driver (born 1975)

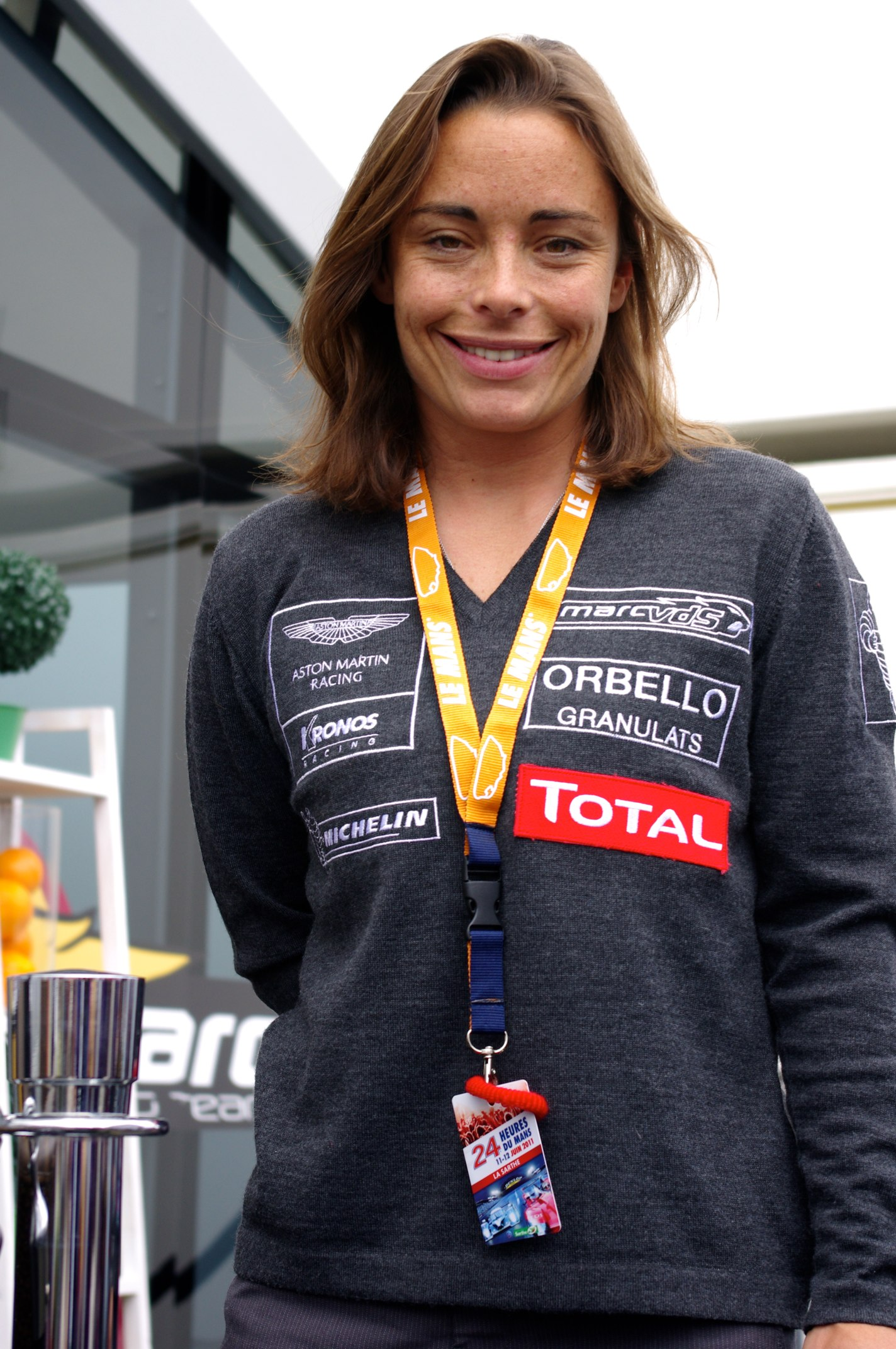
- Ickx at Le Mans in 2011
- Nationality: Belgian
- Born: Vanina Catherine Célia Ickx; 16 February 1975 (age 51) Brussels, Belgium
- Categorisation: FIA Silver (until 2024); FIA Bronze (2025–)

24 Hours of Le Mans career
- Years: 2001, 2003, 2005, 2008–2011
- Teams: Paul Belmondo Racing, T2M Motorsports, Rollcentre Racing, Creation Autosportif, Signature-Plus
- Best finish: 7th (2011)

Vanina Catherine Célia Ickx (born 16 February 1975) is a Belgian racing driver.

== Career ==
Vanina Catherine Célia Ickx was born in Brussels on 16 February 1975. She is the daughter of racing driver Jacky Ickx and his first wife Catherine. Ickx started racing at a relatively late age, entering the BMW Compact Cup in 1996, partnering the Cup's most successful entrant, Stéphane De Groodt. For 1997, she got a Cup racer of her own, before she moved up to the Belgian Procar series in 1998, which ran to Super Production regulations. She shared a BMW 320i with Sylvie Delcour. In 1998, Ickx transferred to the Renault team, partnered by Frenchman Franck Lagorce. She scored her first podium that year, but on the downside, when sharing a car with her father Jacky, she crashed out of the Spa 24 Hours, admittedly by her own fault. She remained a part of the Renault team in 1999. In 2000, she joined Peugeot, resulting in a career-high third place overall in that year's Spa 24 Hours. That same year she would also score her first victory in the Ferrari Challenge.

Already having participated in two Rally Raid events the year before, Ickx entered the Dakar Rally for the first time in 2000, co-driving with her father, Jacky. Since then she has entered the raid two more times, the last time being in 2002.

In 2001, Ickx tried her hand at single-seater racing for the first time, participating in the U.S. F2000 National Championship. The rest of the year she filled with guest appearances in races in Europe: the 24 Hours of Le Mans, the Belgian Toyota Yaris Cup, the Porsche Supercup, and the Spa 24 Hours. With the exception of the Formula 2000 and the 24 Hours of Le Mans, Ickx's 2002 racing schedule was pretty similar to the one she had in 2001.

2003 proved to be a rather quiet year with participation at Le Mans and Spa-Francorchamps, another Ferrari Challenge event and a guest-outing in the Formula Renault V6 Eurocup at Estoril.

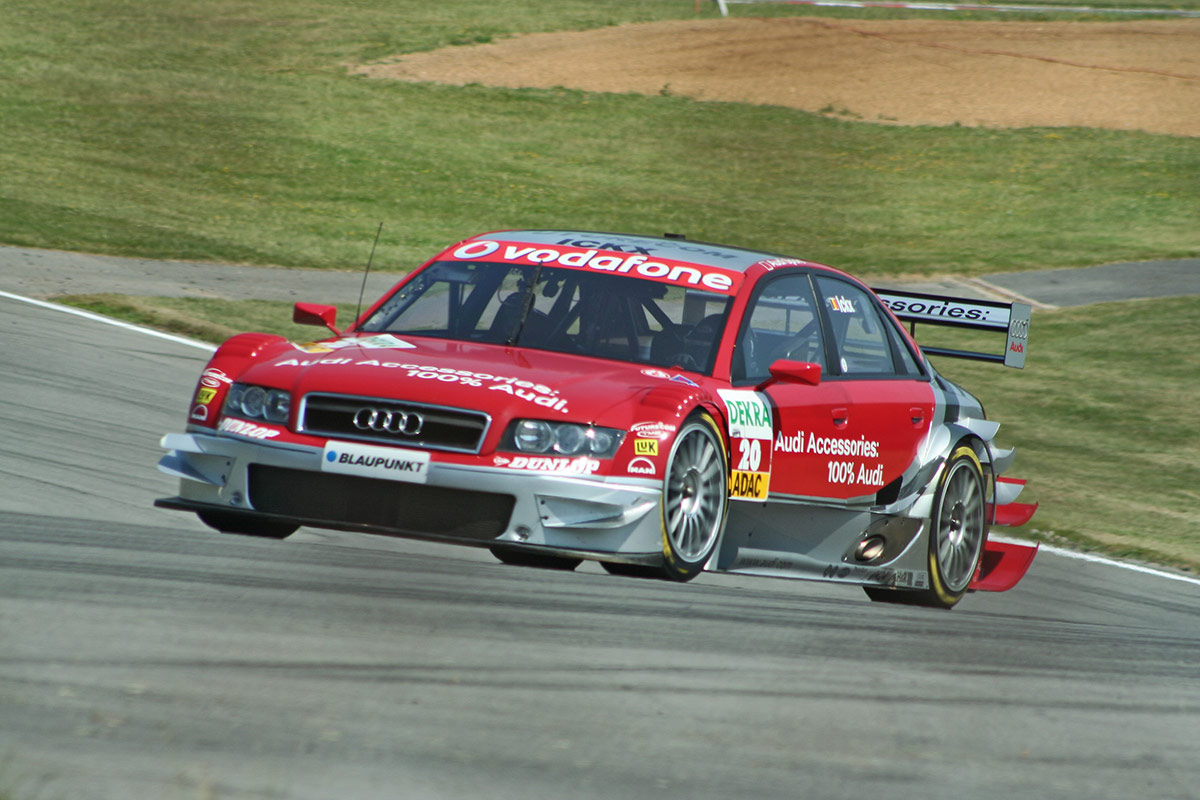
Ickx driving for Audi (Futurecom TME) in the 2006 DTM season.

For 2004, Ickx once again had a full-time program, this time in the Belcar championship. The Belcar campaign proved successful as the year ended with Ickx taking home the Ladies Trophy. She scored another victory in the Ferrari Challenge, while finishing on the podium at the Oman Desert Rally Raid and the Monza round of the short-lived Formula X championship. She collected a class victory in the Spa 24 Hours and made a guest appearance in the Porsche Supercup at the Belgian Grand Prix. 2005 saw Ickx continue in the Belcar championship, racing the same Mini Cooper she did the year before, and she netted her first class victory in the Tourisme division. At the same time, having made her debut in the Le Mans Endurance Series the year before in the GT class, she entered the LMP1 division by finishing third three times in a row, driving the Rollcentre Racing Dallara SP1. Another class victory came her way at the Chinese round of the FIA GT Championship, racing a Belgian-made Gillet Vertigo in the invitation class.

Ickx was hired by Audi to race in the Deutsche Tourenwagen Masters in 2006 and 2007, but was replaced by Katherine Legge for 2008.

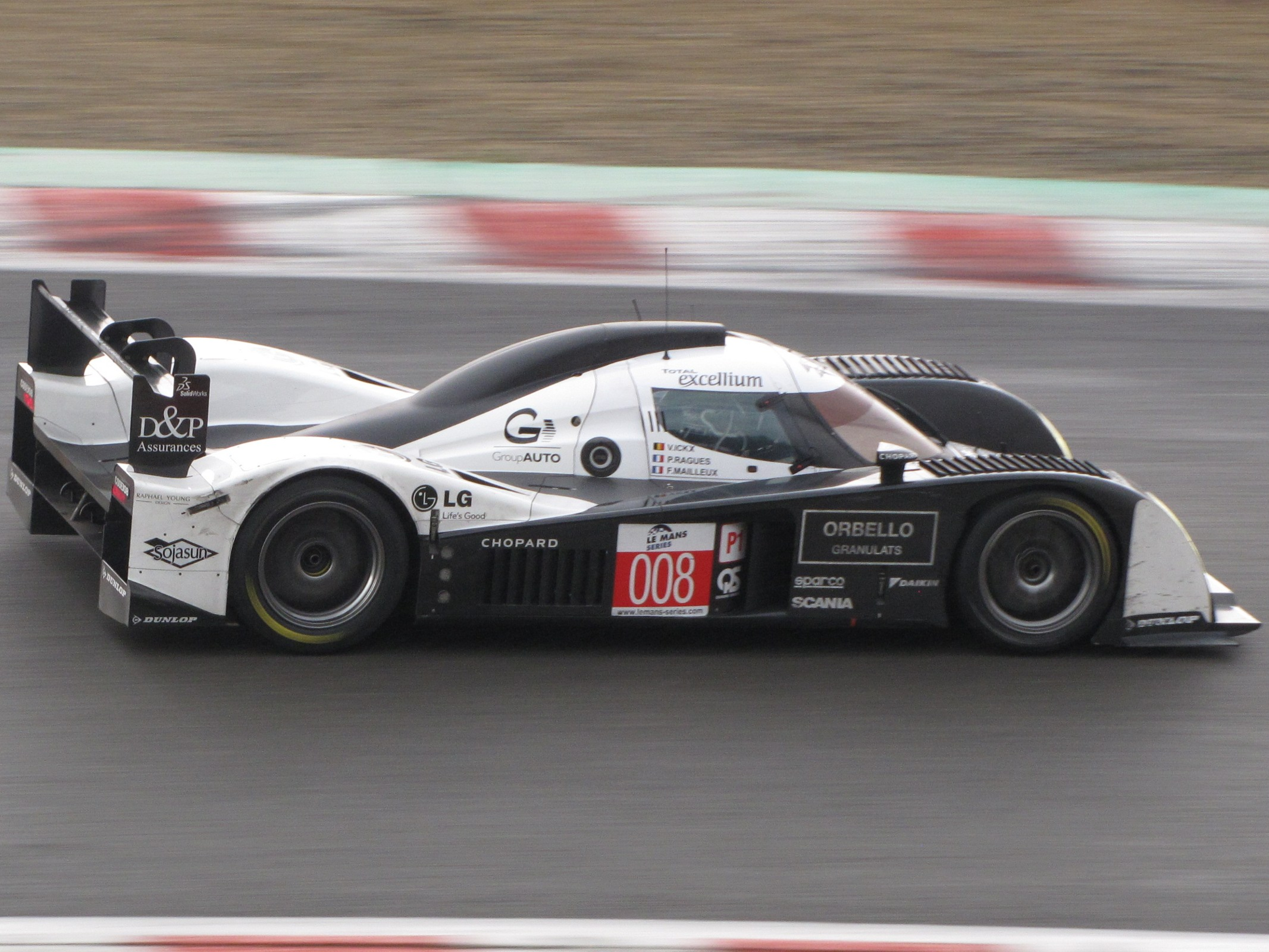
Ickx driving a Lola-Aston Martin for Signature Plus in the 2010 LMS season.

In October 2011, Ickx participated in the World Solar Challenge for the Umicore Solar Team. and in the Intercontinental Le Mans Cup.

Ickx was the first driver to get behind the wheel of the Citroën Survolt (a concept electric racing car) at Le Mans on 12 July 2010.

Ickx married Benjamin de Broqueville in 2014. Together, they have one son named Ado who was born in April 2013 and a daughter Khadija born in 2017.

== Career results ==
=== 24 Hours of Spa results ===
Year	Team	Co-Drivers	Car	Class	Laps	Pos.	Class Pos.
1996	(Japan) Team Honda Challenge	(Belgium) Christian Jupsin (Belgium) Pascal Tillekaerts	Honda Civic VTi	Procar	442	16th	**2nd**
1997	(Belgium) BMW Fina	(Switzerland) Florence Duez (Italy) Kathe Rafanelli	BMW M3	Spa +3.0	214	DNF	DNF
1998	Renault Sport Belgium	(Belgium) Jacky Ickx	Renault Mégane	SP	?	DNF	DNF
1999	Team Renault Sport Belgium	(Belgium) Martial Chouvel (Belgium) Mathias Viaene	Renault Mégane	SP	479	5th	5th
2000	(Belgium) Peugeot Team Belgique Luxembourg	(France) Anthony Beltoise (Belgium) Thierry van Dalen	Peugeot 306 GTi	SP	463	**3rd**	**2nd**
2001	(Germany) Freisinger Motorsport	(France) Xavier Pompidou (France) Christophe Tinseau (Belgium) Tim Verbergt	Porsche 911 GT3-RS	N-GT	136	DNF	DNF
2002	Racing Team Belgium	(Belgium) Renaud Kuppens (Belgium) David Saelens	Gillet Vertigo Streiff	National GT	350	DNF	DNF
2003	(France) Larbre Compétition	(France) Jean-Luc Blanchemain (Finland) Pertti Kuismanen (Italy) Stefano Zonca	Chrysler Viper GTS-R	GT	234	DNF	DNF
2004	(Belgium) Mühlner Motorsport	(Belgium) Jean-François Hemroulle (Switzerland) Peter Wyss	Porsche 911 GT3 Cup	G3	507	10th	**1st**
2005	(Belgium) Mühlner Motorsport	(Germany) Heinz-Josef Bermes (Belgium) Jean-François Hemroulle (Germany) Helmut Reis	Porsche 911 GT3 Cup	G3	198	DNF	DNF

=== 24 Hours of Nürburgring results ===
Year	Team	Co-Drivers	Car	Class	Laps	Pos.	Class Pos.
2000	(Germany) Sakura 2000	(Germany) Ellen Lohr (Germany) Sabine Schmitz (Italy) Tamara Vidali	Honda S2000	A7	64	DNF	DNF
2005	(Belgium) Mühlner Motorsport	(Germany) André Duve (Belgium) Jean-François Hemroulle (Belgium) Bert Lambrecht	Porsche 911 GT3 Cup	A7	129	6th	**3rd**
2009	(Germany) Volkswagen Motorsport	(Germany) Thomas Klenke (Germany) Klaus Niedzwiedz (Germany) Peter Terting	Volkswagen Scirocco GT24-CNG	AT	140	17th	**1st**
2010	(Germany) Volkswagen Motorsport	(Qatar) Nasser Al-Attiyah (Germany) Dieter Depping (Germany) Klaus Niedzwiedz	Volkswagen Scirocco GT24-CNG	AT	143	16th	**1st**
2011	(Germany) Volkswagen Motorsport	(Germany) Klaus Niedzwiedz (Germany) Bernd Ostmann (Switzerland) Peter Wyss	Volkswagen Scirocco GT24-CNG	AT	132	46th	**2nd**

=== 24 Hours of Le Mans results ===
Year	Team	Co-Drivers	Car	Class	Laps	Pos.	Class Pos.
2001	(France) Paul Belmondo Racing	(Belgium) Vincent Vosse (Sweden) Carl Rosenblad	Chrysler Viper GTS-R	GTS	61	DNF	DNF
2003	(Germany) T2M Motorsport	(France) Roland Bervillé (France) Patrick Bourdais	Porsche 911 GT3-RS	GT	264	27th	9th
2005	(United Kingdom) Rollcentre Racing	(Portugal) João Barbosa (United Kingdom) Martin Short	Dallara SP1-Judd	LMP1	318	16th	8th
2008	(United Kingdom) Rollcentre Racing	(Portugal) João Barbosa (France) Stéphan Grégoire	Pescarolo 01-Judd	LMP1	352	11th	10th
2009	(United Kingdom) Creation Autosportif	(United Kingdom) Jamie Campbell-Walter (France) Romain Iannetta	Creation CA07-Judd	LMP1	319	24th	15th
2010	(France) Signature Plus	(France) Franck Mailleux (France) Pierre Ragues	Lola-Aston Martin B09/60	LMP1	302	DNF	DNF
2011	(Belgium) Kronos Racing (Belgium) Marc VDS Racing Team	(Belgium) Bas Leinders (Belgium) Maxime Martin	Lola-Aston Martin B09/60	LMP1	328	7th	7th

=== Complete Le Mans Series results ===
(key) (Races in bold indicate pole position; results in italics indicate fastest lap)

Year	Entrant	Class	Chassis	Engine	1	2	3	4	5	Rank	Points
2004	T2M Motorsport	GT	Porsche 911 GT3-RS	Porsche 3.6 L Flat-6	MNZ; Ret	NÜR; 13	SIL	SPA; 6		29th	3
2005	Rollcentre Racing	LMP1	Dallara SP1	Judd GV4 4.0 L V10	SPA; 3	MNZ; 3	SIL; 3	NÜR; 5	IST; 6	4th	25
2008	Rollcentre Racing	LMP1	Pescarolo 01	Judd GV5.5 S2 5.5 L V10	CAT; 7	MNZ; 7	SPA; 9	NÜR; 9	SIL; 8	16th	5
2010	Signature Plus	LMP1	Lola-Aston Martin B09/60	Aston Martin AM04 6.0 L V12	LEC; 6	SPA; 8	ALG; 3	HUN; 3	SIL; 6	4th	55

=== Complete DTM results ===
(key) (Races in bold indicate pole position) (Races in italics indicate fastest lap)

Year	Team	Car	1	2	3	4	5	6	7	8	9	10	Pos	Points
2006	Futurecom TME	Audi A4 DTM 2004	HOC; 15	LAU; 16	OSC; 18	BRH; Ret	NOR; 13	NÜR; 18	ZAN; Ret	CAT; Ret	BUG; 16	HOC; 11	19th	0
2007	Futurecom TME	Audi A4 DTM 2005	HOC; 15	OSC; Ret	LAU; 15	BRH; 17	NOR; Ret	MUG; Ret	ZAN; Ret	NÜR; 19	CAT; 13	HOC; 18	21st	0

=== Complete GT1 World Championship results ===
Year	Team	Car	1	2	3	4	5	6	7	8	9	10	11	12	13	14	15	16	17	18	19	20	Pos	Points
2011	Belgian Racing	Ford	ABU; QR	ABU; CR	ZOL; QR; Ret	ZOL; CR; Ret	ALG; QR; 14	ALG; CR; 11	SAC; QR; Ret	SAC; CR; Ret	SIL; QR; 7	SIL; CR; 9	NAV; QR; 11	NAV; CR; 11	PRI; QR; Ret	PRI; CR; 13	ORD; QR	ORD; CR	BEI; QR	BEI; CR	SAN; QR	SAN; CR	33rd	2

=== Pikes Peak International Hill Climb ===
Year	Car	Time	Pos.	Class Pos.	Ref
2018	Gillet Vertigo	10:54.901	34th	6th	

=== Complete Le Mans Cup results ===
(key) (Races in bold indicate pole position) (Races in italics indicate the fastest lap)

Year	Entrant	Car	Class	1	2	3	4	5	6	7	DC	Points
2025	Iron Dames	Porsche 911 GT3 R (992)	GT3	BAR; Ret	LEC; 4	LMS; WD	LMS; WD	SPA; 3	**SIL**; 1	ALG; 5	4th	63

^{*} Season still in progress.
