= Alex Müller (racing driver) =

German racing driver

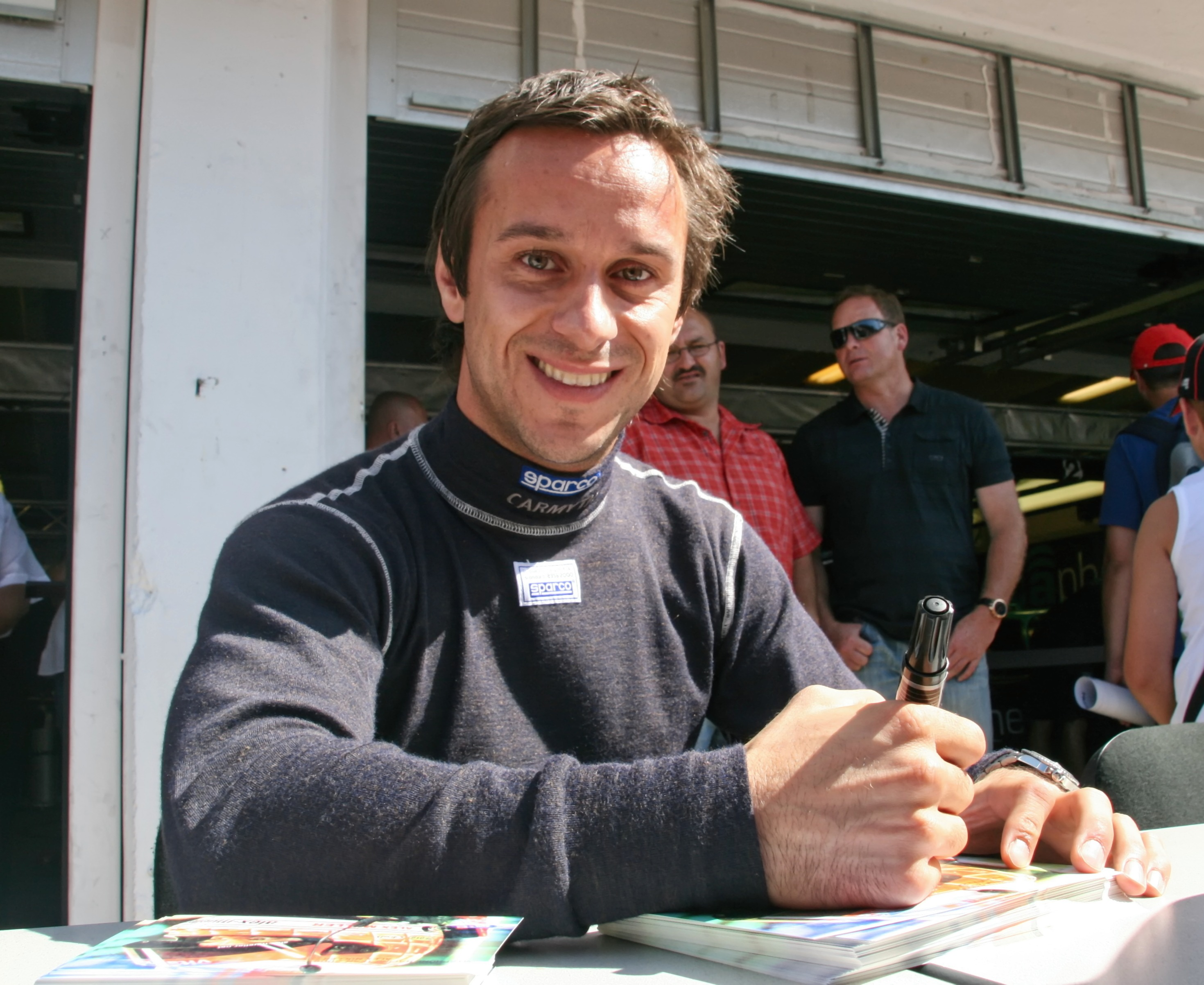
- Nationality: (Germany) German
- Born: Alexander Müller; 20 January 1979 (age 47) Emmerich, West Germany

FIA GT1 World Championship career
- Debut season: 2010
- Current team: Triple H Team Hegersport
- Categorisation: FIA Platinum (until 2013); FIA Gold (2014–2019); FIA Silver (2020–)
- Car number: 33
- Former teams: Mad-Croc Racing
- Starts: 14
- Wins: 0
- Poles: 0
- Fastest laps: 1
- Best finish: 26th in 2010

Previous series
- 2004, 2007–09 2005 2003 2001 1999 1998, 2002 1997–98, 2000 1996 1996 1995: FIA GT Championship; Italian F3; NASCAR Craftsman Trucks; Euro Formula 3000; French F3; International F3000; German F3; Formula Renault Europe; Formula Renault Germany; BMW Formula Junior

Championship titles
- 1996: Formula Renault Germany

NASCAR FedEx Freight Truck Series career
- 2 races run over 1 year
- Best finish: 88th (2003)
- First race: 2003 Power Stroke Diesel 200 (IRP
- Last race: 2003 Advance Auto Parts 200 (Martinsville)
Wins	Top tens	Poles
0	0	0

Alexander Müller (born 20 January 1979) is a German racing driver.

== Career ==
Müller stepped up from karting in 1995, and finished third in BMW Formula Junior driving for Abt Sportsline. In 1996 he won Formula Renault Germany. Müller stepped up to Formula Three for 1997, finishing third in the German Formula Three Championship.

Müller stepped up to International Formula 3000 for 1998 driving as a BMW Junior for the Oreca team, but only finished in 20th position. He opted to race in the French Formula Three Championship in 1999, and finished seventh. He then returned to the German championship in 2000, and finished as runner-up to Giorgio Pantano, driving for Team Ghinzani. In 2001, he raced for the team in Euro 3000, and finished third in the standings behind Felipe Massa and Thomas Biagi. Müller returned to International F3000 in 2002, driving the first five rounds for Durango before moving to European Minardi for the next four rounds, but he failed to score any points during his nine races and separated from the team with three rounds remaining.

Müller tested with IndyCar Series team PDM Racing at the beginning of 2003. He competed at two NASCAR Craftsman Truck Series short tracks before the end of the season. He finished 26th in the No. 23 Team Racing at Indianapolis Raceway Park and finished 25th in the No. 07 Green Light Racing at Martinsville Speedway.

Having failed to find sponsorship for NASCAR or IndyCar campaigns, Müller returned to Europe in 2004. He was due to race for Taurus Sports at the opening round of the inaugural Le Mans Series season, but the car did not start the race. He did race in the 2004 Spa 24 Hours for JMB Racing with Karl Wendlinger, Bert Longin and Pierre-Yves Corthals. The team finished the race in 16th place.

Müller returned to Formula Three in 2005, racing for his old team Ghinzani in the Italian Formula Three Championship. He finished as runner-up to Luigi Ferrara, nine points behind, having had twenty points taken away for a technical irregularity.

After sitting out the 2006 season, Müller once again raced in the Spa 24 Hours, this time for Scuderia Playteam Sarafree, finishing 18th in a Maserati MC12.

For 2008, Müller raced full-time in the FIA GT Championship for Jetalliance Racing in their second Aston Martin DBR9, alongside owner Lukas Lichtner-Hoyer. Müller set pole position for the second race of the season at Monza, but the car did not finish the race. The car did finish second at Oschersleben behind its sister car driven by Ryan Sharp and Karl Wendlinger.

Müller was signed by the Vitaphone Racing Team for the 2009 season, to race its second Maserati MC12, as teammate to Miguel Ramos. The pair finished eighth in the standings, after scoring three pole positions. They helped Vitaphone to win the teams championship. Müller also finished third in the GT1 class at the 24 Hours of Le Mans with Jetalliance, having set class pole position.

Müller competed in the new FIA GT1 World Championship in 2010, driving a Corvette C6.R for the Mad-Croc Racing banner alongside Xavier Maassen for the first round before being replaced by Nicolas Armindo for the second round. At the fifth round at Spa-Francorchamps, he replaced Alexandros Margaritis at Triple H Team Hegersport and reached for them until the end of the season.

== Racing record ==
=== NASCAR ===
(key) (Bold – Pole position awarded by qualifying time. Italics – Pole position earned by points standings or practice time. * – Most laps led.)

==== Craftsman Truck Series ====
NASCAR Craftsman Truck Series results
Year	Team	No.	Make	1	2	3	4	5	6	7	8	9	10	11	12	13	14	15	16	17	18	19	20	21	22	23	24	25	NCTC	Pts	Ref
2003	Team Racing	23	Chevy	DAY	DAR	MMR	MAR	CLT	DOV	TEX	MEM	MLW	KAN	KEN	GTW	MCH	IRP; 26	NSH	BRI	RCH	NHA	CAL	LVS	SBO	TEX				88th	173	
2003	Green Light Racing	07	Chevy																							MAR; 25	PHO	HOM	88th	173	

=== Complete 24 Hours of Le Mans results ===
Year	Team	Co-Drivers	Car	Class	Laps	Pos.	Class Pos.
2009	(Austria) Jetalliance Racing	(Austria) Lukas Lichtner-Hoyer (Austria) Thomas Gruber	Aston Martin DBR9	GT1	294	31st	**3rd**

=== Complete GT1 World Championship results ===
Year	Team	Car	1	2	3	4	5	6	7	8	9	10	11	12	13	14	15	16	17	18	19	20	Pos	Points
2010	Mad-Croc Racing	Corvette	ABU; QR; 14	ABU; CR; 10	SIL; QR	SIL; CR	BRN; QR	BRN; CR	PRI; QR	PRI; CR													26th	24
2010	Triple H Team Hegersport	Maserati									SPA; QR; 12	SPA; CR; 2	NÜR; QR; 13	NÜR; CR; 20	ALG; QR; 6	ALG; CR; 9	NAV; QR; 6	NAV; CR; Ret	INT; QR; 10	INT; CR; 10	SAN; QR; 11	SAN; CR; 9	26th	24
2011	Young Driver AMR	Aston Martin	ABU; QR; Ret	ABU; CR; 6	ZOL; QR; 3	ZOL; CR; 3	ALG; QR; Ret	ALG; CR; Ret	SAC; QR; 10	SAC; CR; Ret	SIL; QR; 1	SIL; CR; 2	NAV; QR; Ret	NAV; CR; 13	PRI; QR; 2	PRI; CR; 3	ORD; QR; 16	ORD; CR; 14	BEI; QR; 1	BEI; CR; 2	SAN; QR; 5	SAN; CR; 10	4th	103

=== Complete International Formula 3000 results ===
(key) (Races in bold indicate pole position) (Races in italics indicate fastest lap)

Year	Entrant	1	2	3	4	5	6	7	8	9	10	11	12	DC	Points
1998	RTL Team Oreca	OSC; Ret	IMO; Ret	CAT; 10	SIL; 11	MON; Ret	PAU; Ret	A1R; 11	HOC; Ret	HUN; 20	SPA; 5	PER; 20	NÜR; 13	20th	2
1999	Cica Team Oreca	IMO	MON	CAT	MAG	SIL; DNQ	A1R; DNQ	HOC; DNQ	HUN; DNQ	SPA	NÜR			NC	-
2002	Durango Formula	INT; 11	IMO; Ret	CAT; Ret	A1R; 13	MON; DSQ								20th	0
2002	European Minardi F3000						NÜR; Ret	SIL; 11	MAG; 14	HOC; Ret	HUN	SPA	MNZ	20th	0

Sporting positions
Preceded by Ralf Druckenmüller	German Formula Renault champion 1996	Succeeded by Robert Lechner
