= 2011 FIA GT1 Beijing round =

The Goldenport Park Circuit

The 2011 FIA GT1 Beijing round was an auto racing event held at the Goldenport Park Circuit, Beijing, China on 8–10 September, and was the ninth round of the 2011 FIA GT1 World Championship season. It was the FIA GT1 World Championship's second race held in China, a week after the Ordos round as well as at the 3.30 km (2.05 mi) Goldenport Park. This was a stand-alone event with no support races.

== Background ==
Success Ballast
Entry	Ballast
No. 41 Marc VDS Racing Team	40 kg (88 lb)
No. 22 JR Motorsports	25 kg (55 lb)
No. 8 Young Driver AMR	20 kg (44 lb)
No. 3 Hexis AMR	10 kg (22 lb)

Ordos Championship Race winner Frédéric Makowiecki was at the 6 Hours of Silverstone and was replaced by Bertrand Baguette who had previously raced for Marc VDS in 2011 at the Navarra round. Jonathan Hirschi replaced Vanina Ickx in the No. 9 Belgian Racing Ford GT alongside regular Christoffer Nygaard. Nico Verdonck returns to Exim Bank Team China replacing Sérgio Jimenez in the No. 12 car. Like Baguette, he had previously raced for the Chinese team at Navarra behind the wheel of the No. 11 car.

Michael Krumm and Lucas Luhr went into this weekend as championship leaders in the Drivers Championship, twelve points ahead of All-Inkl drivers Marc Basseng and Markus Winkelhock. In the Teams Championship, JR Motorsport] remained on top with a five-point lead over second place Hexis AMR and All-Inkl.com another three points behind Hexis.

== Qualifying ==
=== Qualifying result ===
For qualifying, Driver 1 participates in the first and third sessions while Driver 2 participates in only the second session. The fastest lap for each session is indicated with bold.

Pos	No.	Driver 1	Team	Session 1	Session 2	Session 3	Grid
Pos	No.	Driver 2	Team	Session 1	Session 2	Session 3	Grid
1	41	(Belgium) Maxime Martin	(Belgium) Marc VDS Racing Team	1:00.992	1:00.947	1:00.344	1
1	41	(Belgium) Bertrand Baguette	(Belgium) Marc VDS Racing Team	1:00.992	1:00.947	1:00.344	1
2	8	(United Kingdom) Darren Turner	(Germany) Young Driver AMR	1:00.818	1:00.778	1:00.441	2
2	8	(Germany) Stefan Mücke	(Germany) Young Driver AMR	1:00.818	1:00.778	1:00.441	2
3	7	(Czech Republic) Tomáš Enge	(Germany) Young Driver AMR	1:01.370	1:00.800	1:00.465	3
3	7	(Germany) Alex Müller	(Germany) Young Driver AMR	1:01.370	1:00.800	1:00.465	3
4	38	(Germany) Marc Basseng	(Germany) All-Inkl.com Münnich Motorsport	1:00.999	1:00.853	1:00.588	4
4	38	(Germany) Markus Winkelhock	(Germany) All-Inkl.com Münnich Motorsport	1:00.999	1:00.853	1:00.588	4
5	12	(France) Michaël Rossi	Exim Bank Team China	1:01.413	1:00.873	1:00.741	5
5	12	(Belgium) Nico Verdonck	Exim Bank Team China	1:01.413	1:00.873	1:00.741	5
6	40	(Belgium) Bas Leinders	(Belgium) Marc VDS Racing Team	1:01.396	1:00.602	1:00.943	6
6	40	(Germany) Marc Hennerici	(Belgium) Marc VDS Racing Team	1:01.396	1:00.602	1:00.943	6
7	9	(Denmark) Christoffer Nygaard	(Belgium) Belgian Racing	1:01.304	1:01.044	1:01.253	7
7	9	(Switzerland) Jonathan Hirschi	(Belgium) Belgian Racing	1:01.304	1:01.044	1:01.253	7
8	21	(Australia) David Brabham	(United Kingdom) Sumo Power GT	1:01.512	1:00.847	1:01.390	8
8	21	(United Kingdom) Jamie Campbell-Walter	(United Kingdom) Sumo Power GT	1:01.512	1:00.847	1:01.390	8
9	22	(United Kingdom) Peter Dumbreck	(United Kingdom) JR Motorsports	1:01.267	1:01.074		9
9	22	(United Kingdom) Richard Westbrook	(United Kingdom) JR Motorsports	1:01.267	1:01.074		9
10	37	(Germany) Dominik Schwager	(Germany) All-Inkl.com Münnich Motorsport	1:01.263	1:01.118		10
10	37	(Netherlands) Nicky Pastorelli	(Germany) All-Inkl.com Münnich Motorsport	1:01.263	1:01.118		10
11	11	(China) Ho-Pin Tung	Exim Bank Team China	1:01.472	1:01.173		10
11	11	(Netherlands) Jeroen den Boer	Exim Bank Team China	1:01.472	1:01.173		10
12	4	(Italy) Andrea Piccini	(France) Hexis AMR	1:01.349	1:01.285		12
12	4	(Germany) Christian Hohenadel	(France) Hexis AMR	1:01.349	1:01.285		12
13	48	(United Kingdom) Jonathan Kennard	(Luxembourg) DKR www-discount.de	1:01.160	1:01.335		13
13	48	(Germany) Christopher Brück	(Luxembourg) DKR www-discount.de	1:01.160	1:01.335		13
14	10	(France) Yann Clairay	(Belgium) Belgian Racing	1:01.621	1:01.453		14
14	10	(France) Antoine Leclerc	(Belgium) Belgian Racing	1:01.621	1:01.453		14
15	47	(Switzerland) Benjamin Leuenberger	(Luxembourg) DKR www-discount.de	1:01.713			15
15	47	(Germany) Manuel Lauck	(Luxembourg) DKR www-discount.de	1:01.713			15
16	23	(Germany) Michael Krumm	(United Kingdom) JR Motorsports	1:02.054			16
16	23	(Germany) Lucas Luhr	(United Kingdom) JR Motorsports	1:02.054			16
17	3	(Monaco) Clivio Piccione	(France) Hexis AMR	9:08.775			17
17	3	(Netherlands) Stef Dusseldorp	(France) Hexis AMR	9:08.775			17
18	20	(Brazil) Enrique Bernoldi	(United Kingdom) Sumo Power GT	No Time			18
18	20	(Netherlands) Nick Catsburg	(United Kingdom) Sumo Power GT	No Time			18

== Races ==
=== Qualifying Race ===
==== Race result ====
Pos	No.	Team	Drivers	Manufacturer	Laps	Time/Retired
1	7	(Germany) Young Driver AMR	(Czech Republic) Tomáš Enge (Germany) Alex Müller	Aston Martin	46	
2	8	(Germany) Young Driver AMR	(United Kingdom) Darren Turner (Germany) Stefan Mücke	Aston Martin	46	−1.089
3	4	(France) Hexis AMR	(Italy) Andrea Piccini (Germany) Christian Hohenadel	Aston Martin	46	−1.673
4	23	(United Kingdom) JR Motorsports	(Germany) Michael Krumm (Germany) Lucas Luhr	Nissan	46	−2.177
5	3	(France) Hexis AMR	(Monaco) Clivio Piccione (Netherlands) Stef Dusseldorp	Aston Martin	46	−2.859
6	9	(Belgium) Belgian Racing	(Denmark) Christoffer Nygaard (Switzerland) Jonathan Hirschi	Ford	46	−3.166
7	22	(United Kingdom) JR Motorsports	(United Kingdom) Peter Dumbreck (United Kingdom) Richard Westbrook	Nissan	46	−4.455
8	12	Exim Bank Team China	(France) Michaël Rossi (Belgium) Nico Verdonck	Corvette	46	−4.974
9	37	(Germany) All-Inkl.com Münnich Motorsport	(Germany) Dominik Schwager (Netherlands) Nicky Pastorelli	Lamborghini	46	−5.931
10	20	(United Kingdom) Sumo Power GT	(Brazil) Enrique Bernoldi (Netherlands) Nick Catsburg	Nissan	46	−6.401
11	21	(United Kingdom) Sumo Power GT	(Australia) David Brabham (United Kingdom) Jamie Campbell-Walter	Nissan	46	−7.188
12	38	(Germany) All-Inkl.com Münnich Motorsport	(Germany) Marc Basseng (Germany) Markus Winkelhock	Lamborghini	46	−7.531
13	47	(Luxembourg) DKR www-discount.de	(Switzerland) Benjamin Leuenberger (Germany) Manuel Lauck	Lamborghini	46	−8.833
14 DNF	11	Exim Bank Team China	(China) Ho-Pin Tung (Netherlands) Jeroen den Boer	Corvette	39	Accident
15 DNF	40	(Belgium) Marc VDS Racing Team	(Belgium) Bas Leinders (Germany) Marc Hennerici	Ford	15	Retired
16 DNF	41	(Belgium) Marc VDS Racing Team	(Belgium) Maxime Martin (Belgium) Bertrand Baguette	Ford	3	Accident
17 DNF	10	(Belgium) Belgian Racing	(France) Yann Clairay (France) Antoine Leclerc	Ford	1	Transmission
DNS	48	(Luxembourg) DKR www-discount.de	(United Kingdom) Jonathan Kennard (Germany) Christopher Brück	Lamborghini	–	Engine

=== Championship Race ===
==== Race result ====
Pos	No.	Team	Drivers	Manufacturer	Laps	Time/Retired
1	8	(Germany) Young Driver AMR	(United Kingdom) Darren Turner (Germany) Stefan Mücke	Aston Martin	42	
2	7	(Germany) Young Driver AMR	(Czech Republic) Tomáš Enge (Germany) Alex Müller	Aston Martin	42	−0.972
3	23	(United Kingdom) JR Motorsports	(Germany) Michael Krumm (Germany) Lucas Luhr	Nissan	42	−1.593
4	41	(Belgium) Marc VDS Racing Team	(Belgium) Maxime Martin (Belgium) Bertrand Baguette	Ford	42	−2.726
5	12	Exim Bank Team China	(France) Michaël Rossi (Belgium) Nico Verdonck	Corvette	42	−2.955
6	20	(United Kingdom) Sumo Power GT	(Brazil) Enrique Bernoldi (Netherlands) Nick Catsburg	Nissan	42	−3.387
7	22	(United Kingdom) JR Motorsports	(United Kingdom) Peter Dumbreck (United Kingdom) Richard Westbrook	Nissan	42	−3.723
8	21	(United Kingdom) Sumo Power GT	(Australia) David Brabham (United Kingdom) Jamie Campbell-Walter	Nissan	42	−4.838
9	47	(Luxembourg) DKR www-discount.de	(Switzerland) Benjamin Leuenberger (Germany) Manuel Lauck	Lamborghini	42	−6.160
10 DNF	4	(France) Hexis AMR	(Italy) Andrea Piccini (Germany) Christian Hohenadel	Aston Martin	37	Accident
11 DNF	11	Exim Bank Team China	(China) Ho-Pin Tung (Netherlands) Jeroen den Boer	Corvette	37	Accident
12 DNF	40	(Belgium) Marc VDS Racing Team	(Belgium) Bas Leinders (Germany) Marc Hennerici	Ford	25	Retired
13 DNF	10	(Belgium) Belgian Racing	(France) Yann Clairay (France) Antoine Leclerc	Ford	21	Retired
14 DNF	48	(Luxembourg) DKR www-disount.de	(United Kingdom) Jonathan Kennard (Germany) Christopher Brück	Lamborghini	18	Spun
15 DNF	37	(Germany) All-Inkl.com Münnich Motorsport	(Germany) Dominik Schwager (Netherlands) Nicky Pastorelli	Lamborghini	7	Retired
16 DNF	9	(Belgium) Belgian Racing	(Denmark) Christoffer Nygaard (Switzerland) Jonathan Hirschi	Ford	4	Damage
17 DNF	3	(France) Hexis AMR	(Monaco) Clivio Piccione (Netherlands) Stef Dusseldorp	Aston Martin	3	Collision
18 DNF	38	(Germany) All-Inkl.com Münnich Motorsport	(Germany) Marc Basseng (Germany) Markus Winkelhock	Lamborghini	3	Collision

FIA GT1 World Championship
Previous race: Ordos	2011 season	Next race: San Luis
