= 2011 FIA GT1 Zolder round =

Layout of the Circuit Zolder

The 2011 FIA GT1 Zolder round is an auto racing event held at the Circuit Zolder in Heusden-Zolder, Belgium. Taking place over 8–10 April 2011, the Zolder event will be the second round of the 2011 FIA GT1 World Championship season. It is the first time the series has visited Zolder, replacing the previous Belgian round at Circuit de Spa-Francorchamps, although the FIA GT Championship previously utilized Zolder in 2009. The race weekend is shared with rounds of the Belcar Endurance Championship and the Belgian Touring Car Series.

== Background ==
Success Ballast
Entry	Ballast
No. 3 Hexis AMR	30 kg (66 lb)
No. 22 JR Motorsports	25 kg (55 lb)
No. 38 All-Inkl.com Münnich Motorsport	10 kg (22 lb)

Much of the teams that featured in Abu Dhabi return two weeks later for Zolder, with only the No. 9 Belgian Ford making an alteration to their driver line-up. Fabien Giroix and Antoine Leclerc are replaced by Mathias Beche and local driver Vanina Ickx. Ickx had previously planned to drive in Abu Dhabi, but seating issues forced her to withdraw prior to the event. Following their Championship Race victory in Abu Dhabi, Clivio Piccione and Stef Dusseldorp enter Zolder at the leaders in the Drivers' Championship by three points over Peter Dumbreck and Richard Westbrook, while their Hexis AMR team leads the Teams' Championship over JR Motorsports by eleven points. As a result of their success in Abu Dhabi, Hexis' No. 3 Aston Martin will carry 30 kg (66 lb) of success ballast. The No. 22 JR Motorsports Nissan will carry 25 kg (55 lb) after finishing on the podium in both Qualifying and Championship races, while the No. 38 Münnich Motorsport Lamborghini will carry 10 kg (22 lb).

== Qualifying ==
=== Qualifying result ===
For qualifying, Driver 1 participates in the first and third sessions while Driver 2 participates in only the second session. The fastest lap for each session is indicated with bold.

Pos	No.	Driver 1	Team	Session 1	Session 2	Session 3	Grid
Pos	No.	Driver 2	Team	Session 1	Session 2	Session 3	Grid
1	37	(Germany) Dominik Schwager	(Germany) All-Inkl.com Münnich Motorsport	1:28.422	1:27.913	1:27.691	1
1	37	(Netherlands) Nicky Pastorelli	(Germany) All-Inkl.com Münnich Motorsport	1:28.422	1:27.913	1:27.691	1
2	7	(Germany) Alex Müller	(Germany) Young Driver AMR	1:28.306	1:27.546	1:28.119	4^{1}
2	7	(Czech Republic) Tomáš Enge	(Germany) Young Driver AMR	1:28.306	1:27.546	1:28.119	4^{1}
3	8	(United Kingdom) Darren Turner	(Germany) Young Driver AMR	1:28.000	1:27.779	1:28.170	2
3	8	(Germany) Stefan Mücke	(Germany) Young Driver AMR	1:28.000	1:27.779	1:28.170	2
4	11	(Netherlands) Mike Hezemans	Exim Bank Team China	1:28.864	1:28.098	1:28.283	6^{1}
4	11	(Netherlands) Nick Catsburg	Exim Bank Team China	1:28.864	1:28.098	1:28.283	6^{1}
5	22	(United Kingdom) Peter Dumbreck	(United Kingdom) JR Motorsports	1:28.754	1:28.181	1:28.359	3
5	22	(United Kingdom) Richard Westbrook	(United Kingdom) JR Motorsports	1:28.754	1:28.181	1:28.359	3
6	4	(Germany) Christian Hohenadel	(France) Hexis AMR	1:28.126	1:28.100	1:28.424	5
6	4	(Italy) Andrea Piccini	(France) Hexis AMR	1:28.126	1:28.100	1:28.424	5
7	23	(Germany) Lucas Luhr	(United Kingdom) JR Motorsports	1:28.756	1:27.981	1:28.521	9^{1}
7	23	(Germany) Michael Krumm	(United Kingdom) JR Motorsports	1:28.756	1:27.981	1:28.521	9^{1}
8	21	(United Kingdom) Jamie Campbell-Walter	(United Kingdom) Sumo Power GT	1:28.095	1:28.021	1:28.555	7
8	21	(Australia) David Brabham	(United Kingdom) Sumo Power GT	1:28.095	1:28.021	1:28.555	7
9	5	(Austria) Karl Wendlinger	(Switzerland) Swiss Racing Team	1:28.918	1:28.408		8
9	5	(Netherlands) Peter Kox	(Switzerland) Swiss Racing Team	1:28.918	1:28.408		8
10	38	(Germany) Marc Basseng	(Germany) All-Inkl.com Münnich Motorsport	1:28.969	1:28.546		12^{1}
10	38	(Germany) Markus Winkelhock	(Germany) All-Inkl.com Münnich Motorsport	1:28.969	1:28.546		12^{1}
11	20	(Brazil) Ricardo Zonta	(United Kingdom) Sumo Power GT	1:28.628	1:28.595		14^{1}
11	20	(Brazil) Enrique Bernoldi	(United Kingdom) Sumo Power GT	1:28.628	1:28.595		14^{1}
12	41	(Belgium) Maxime Martin	(Belgium) Marc VDS Racing Team	1:27.912	1:28.665		10
12	41	(France) Frédéric Makowiecki	(Belgium) Marc VDS Racing Team	1:27.912	1:28.665		10
13	40	(Germany) Marc Hennerici	(Belgium) Marc VDS Racing Team	1:29.027	1:28.897		16^{1}
13	40	(Belgium) Bas Leinders	(Belgium) Marc VDS Racing Team	1:29.027	1:28.897		16^{1}
14	47	(France) Michaël Rossi	(Luxembourg) DKR Engineering	1:28.555	1:30.743		11
14	47	(Brazil) Jaime Camara	(Luxembourg) DKR Engineering	1:28.555	1:30.743		11
15	3	(Monaco) Clivio Piccione	(France) Hexis AMR	1:29.258			13
15	3	(Netherlands) Stef Dusseldorp	(France) Hexis AMR	1:29.258			13
16	10	(Serbia) Miloš Pavlović	(Belgium) Belgian Racing	1:29.664			15
16	10	(Czech Republic) Martin Matzke	(Belgium) Belgian Racing	1:29.664			15
17	9	(Switzerland) Mathias Beche	(Belgium) Belgian Racing	1:29.686			17
17	9	(Belgium) Vanina Ickx	(Belgium) Belgian Racing	1:29.686			17
18	6	(Sweden) Max Nilsson	(Switzerland) Swiss Racing Team	1:29.857			18
18	6	(Czech Republic) Jiří Janák	(Switzerland) Swiss Racing Team	1:29.857			18

1. The No. 7 Young Driver Aston Martin, No. 11 Exim Bank Corvette, No. 23 JR Motorsport Nissan, No. 38 Münnich Lamborghini, No. 20 Sumo Power Nissan, and No. 40 Marc VDS Ford were all penalized three grid spaces for the Qualifying Race for failing to slow for a yellow flag during the pre-qualifying practice session.

== Races ==
=== Qualifying Race ===
==== Race result ====
Pos	No.	Team	Drivers	Manufacturer	Laps	Time/Retired
1	38	(Germany) All-Inkl.com Münnich Motorsport	(Germany) Marc Basseng (Germany) Markus Winkelhock	Lamborghini	39	
2	11	Exim Bank Team China	(Netherlands) Mike Hezemans (Netherlands) Nick Catsburg	Corvette	39	−3.251
3	7	(Germany) Young Driver AMR	(Germany) Alex Müller (Czech Republic) Tomáš Enge	Aston Martin	39	−6.715
4	5	(Switzerland) Swiss Racing Team	(Austria) Karl Wendlinger (Netherlands) Peter Kox	Lamborghini	39	−6.778
5	41	(Belgium) Marc VDS Racing Team	(Belgium) Maxime Martin (France) Frédéric Makowiecki	Ford	39	−7.055
6	3	(France) Hexis AMR	(Monaco) Clivio Piccione (Netherlands) Stef Dusseldorp	Aston Martin	39	−11.128
7	23	(United Kingdom) JR Motorsports	(Germany) Lucas Luhr (Germany) Michael Krumm	Nissan	39	−33.588
8	6	(Switzerland) Swiss Racing Team	(Sweden) Max Nilsson (Czech Republic) Jiří Janák	Lamborghini	39	−1:12.490
9	47	(Luxembourg) DKR Engineering	(France) Michaël Rossi (Brazil) Jaime Camara	Corvette	39	−1:17.326
10 DNF	4	(France) Hexis AMR	(Germany) Christian Hohenadel (Italy) Andrea Piccini	Aston Martin	36	Suspension
11 DNF	21	(United Kingdom) Sumo Power GT	(United Kingdom) Jamie Campbell-Walter (Australia) David Brabham	Nissan	33	Mechanical
12 DNF	20	(United Kingdom) Sumo Power GT	(Brazil) Ricardo Zonta (Brazil) Enrique Bernoldi	Nissan	29	Mechanical
13 DNF	10	(Belgium) Belgian Racing	(Serbia) Miloš Pavlović (Czech Republic) Martin Matzke	Ford	10	Collision
14 DNF	9	(Belgium) Belgian Racing	(Switzerland) Mathias Beche (Belgium) Vanina Ickx	Ford	10	Collision
15 DNF	8	(Germany) Young Driver AMR	(United Kingdom) Darren Turner (Germany) Stefan Mücke	Aston Martin	3	Suspension
16 DNF	22	(United Kingdom) JR Motorsports	(United Kingdom) Peter Dumbreck (United Kingdom) Richard Westbrook	Nissan	1	Damage
17 DNF	37	(Germany) All-Inkl.com Münnich Motorsport	(Germany) Dominik Schwager (Netherlands) Nicky Pastorelli	Lamborghini	1	Damage
18 DNF	40	(Belgium) Marc VDS Racing Team	(Germany) Marc Hennerici (Belgium) Bas Leinders	Ford	0	Collision

=== Championship Race ===
==== Race result ====
Pos	No.	Team	Drivers	Manufacturer	Laps	Time/Retired
1	38	(Germany) All-Inkl.com Münnich Motorsport	(Germany) Marc Basseng (Germany) Markus Winkelhock	Lamborghini	37	
2	4	(France) Hexis AMR	(Germany) Christian Hohenadel (Italy) Andrea Piccini	Aston Martin	37	−9.250
3	7	(Germany) Young Driver AMR	(Czech Republic) Tomáš Enge (Germany) Alex Müller	Aston Martin	37	−15.465
4	5	(Switzerland) Swiss Racing Team	(Austria) Karl Wendlinger (Netherlands) Peter Kox	Lamborghini	37	−17.970
5	11	Exim Bank Team China	(Netherlands) Mike Hezemans (Netherlands) Nicky Catsburg	Corvette	37	−17.995
6	3	(France) Hexis AMR	(Monaco) Clivio Piccione (Netherlands) Stef Dusseldorp	Aston Martin	37	−20.987
7	8	(Germany) Young Driver AMR	(United Kingdom) Darren Turner (Germany) Stefan Mücke	Aston Martin	37	−23.222
8	41	(Belgium) Marc VDS Racing Team	(Belgium) Maxime Martin (France) Frédéric Makowiecki	Ford	37	−23.345
9	23	(United Kingdom) JR Motorsport	(Germany) Michael Krumm (Germany) Lucas Luhr	Nissan	37	−24.936
10	40	(Belgium) Marc VDS Racing Team	(Belgium) Bas Leinders (Germany) Marc Hennerici	Ford	37	−29.170
11	10	(Belgium) Belgian Racing	(Czech Republic) Martin Matzke (Serbia) Miloš Pavlović	Ford	37	−48.558
12 DNF	22	(United Kingdom) JR Motorsport	(United Kingdom) Peter Dumbreck (United Kingdom) Richard Westbrook	Nissan	5	Damage
13 DNF	9	(Belgium) Belgian Racing	(Belgium) Vanina Ickx (Switzerland) Mathias Beche	Ford	4	Collision
14 DNF	47	(Luxembourg) DKR Engineering	(France) Michaël Rossi (Brazil) Jaime Camara	Corvette	0	Damage
15 DNF	37	(Germany) All-Inkl.com Münnich Motorsport	(Netherlands) Nicky Pastorelli (Germany) Dominik Schwager	Lamborghini	0	Drivetrain
16 DNF	21	(United Kingdom) Sumo Power GT	(Australia) David Brabham (United Kingdom) Jamie Campbell-Walter	Nissan	0	Collision
17 DNF	20	(United Kingdom) Sumo Power GT	(Brazil) Enrique Bernoldi (Brazil) Ricardo Zonta	Nissan	0	Collision
DNS	6	(Switzerland) Swiss Racing Team	(Sweden) Max Nilsson (Czech Republic) Jiří Janák	Lamborghini	—	Did Not Start

FIA GT1 World Championship
Previous race: Abu Dhabi	2011 season	Next race: Algarve
