= Michaël Rossi =

French racing driver

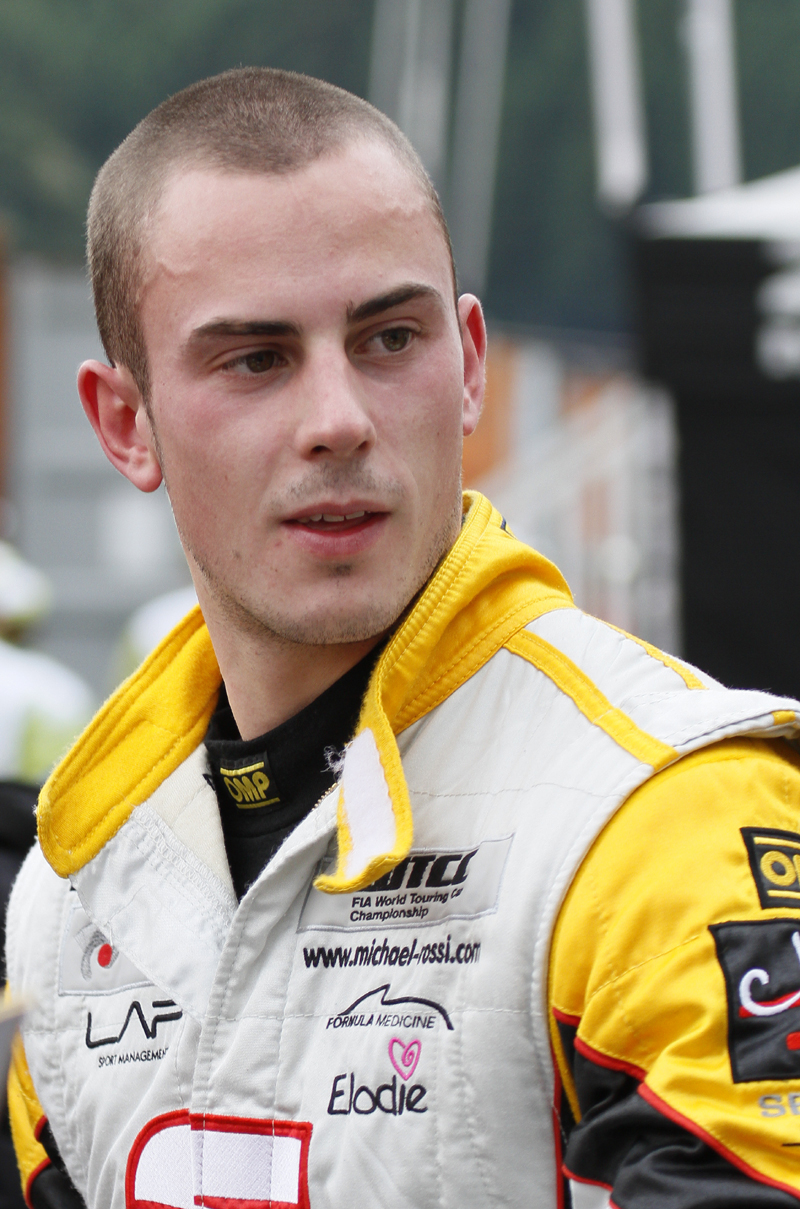
- In 2010, as a WTCC driver.
- Nationality: (France) French
- Born: 12 April 1988 (age 38) Chambéry (France)

SEAT León Eurocup career
- Current team: SUNRED Engineering
- Car number: 32
- Starts: 8
- Wins: 2
- Poles: 1
- Fastest laps: 1
- Best finish: 2nd in 2010

Previous series
- 2009 2009 2008 2007–09 2006 2006 2006: SEAT León Supercopa Spain; Formula Le Mans; THP Spider Cup; Eurocup Mégane Trophy; French Formula Renault; FR2.0 UK Winter Series; Formula Renault 2.0 Italy

Championship titles
- 2008: Eurocup Mégane Trophy

Michaël Rossi (born 12 April 1988 in Chambéry) is a French racing driver.

== Career ==
After racing in karting, Rossi raced in the Championnat de France Formula Renault 2.0 in 2006, driving for both SG Formula and Hexis Racing. However, he only scored one point in 11 races, placing him 21st in the standings.

In 2007, Rossi raced in the Eurocup Mégane Trophy with the Racing for Belgium team, finishing ninth in the standings with one victory. For 2008, he moved to the TDS Racing team, taking four wins on the way to the championship title.

In 2009, Rossi moved to the SEAT León Eurocup, a support series for the World Touring Car Championship, driving a SUNRED Engineering-prepared car. He scored a victory at Brno and at Imola. He finished sixth in the standings after missing two of the six rounds in mid-season. He did a few races of the Spanish series, and scored a podium in his one-off Mégane Trophy return.

As the overall winner of the León Eurocup weekend in Imola, Rossi made his World Touring Car Championship debut at the 2010 FIA WTCC Race of Japan at Okayama driving for SR-Sport.

== Racing record ==
=== Career summary ===
Season	Series	Team	Races	Wins	Poles	F/Laps	Podiums	Points	Position
2006	Italian Formula Renault 2.0	CO2 Motorsport	2	0	0	?	0	0	NC
2006	French Formula Renault 2.0	Hexis Racing	11	0	0	0	0	1	21st
2006	French Formula Renault 2.0	SG Formula	11	0	0	0	0	1	21st
2006	British Formula Renault 2.0 Winter Series	SL Formula Racing	4	0	0	0	0	N/A†	N/A†
2007	Eurocup Mégane Trophy	Racing for Belgium	12	1	2	0	2	41	9th
2008	Eurocup Mégane Trophy	TDS Racing	14	4	8	6	13	170	**1st**
2008	THP Spider Cup	RBA Sport	2	0	0	0	0	14	22nd
2009	SEAT León Eurocup	SUNRED Engineering	8	2	1	1	3	34	6th
2009	SEAT León Supercopa Spain	SUNRED Engineering	6	1	0	0	3	0	NC‡
2009	Eurocup Mégane Trophy	Boutsen Energy Racing	2	0	0	1	1	10	9th
2009	Formula Le Mans Cup	Exagon Engineering	2	0	0	0	0	13	23rd

† - Unlicensed driver: allowed to race without scoring. ‡ - As Rossi was a guest driver, he was ineligible for points.

=== Complete WTCC results ===
(key) (Races in bold indicate pole position) (Races in italics indicate fastest lap)

Year	Team	Car	1	2	3	4	5	6	7	8	9	10	11	12	13	14	15	16	17	18	19	20	21	22	DC	Points
2010	SR-Sport	SEAT León TDI	BRA; 1	BRA; 2	MAR; 1	MAR; 2	ITA; 1	ITA; 2	BEL; 1	BEL; 2	POR; 1	POR; 2	GBR; 1	GBR; 2	CZE; 1	CZE; 2	GER; 1	GER; 2	ESP; 1	ESP; 2	JPN; 1 Ret	JPN; 2; 12	MAC; 1	MAC; 2	**25th**	**0**

=== Complete GT1 World Championship results ===
Year	Team	Car	1	2	3	4	5	6	7	8	9	10	11	12	13	14	15	16	17	18	19	20	Pos	Points
2011	DKR Engineering	Corvette	ABU; QR; Ret	ABU; CR; 13	ZOL; QR; 9	ZOL; CR; Ret	ALG; QR; 15	ALG; CR; Ret	SAC; QR	SAC; CR	SIL; QR; 9	SIL; CR; Ret	NAV; QR; 8	NAV; CR; 7	PRI; QR; 8	PRI; CR; 10							23rd	17
2011	Exim Bank Team China	Corvette															ORD; QR; 15	ORD; CR; 16	BEI; QR; 8	BEI; CR; 5	SAN; QR; 11	SAN; CR; Ret	23rd	17

Sporting positions
Preceded by Pedro Petiz	Eurocup Mégane Trophy Champion; 2008	Succeeded by Mike Verschuur
