= 2011 FIA GT1 Navarra round =

Circuito de Navarra

The 2011 FIA GT1 Navarra round was an auto racing event held at the Circuito de Navarra, Los Arcos, Spain on 1–3 July, and was the sixth round of the 2011 FIA GT1 World Championship season. It was the FIA GT1 World Championship's second race held at the 3.933 km (2.444 mi) Navarra. The event was supported by the FIA GT3 European Championship and MINI Challenge España.

== Background ==
Success Ballast
Entry	Ballast
No. 23 JR Motorsports	35 kg (77 lb)
No. 7 Young Driver AMR	30 kg (66 lb)
No. 11 Exim Bank Team China	10 kg (22 lb)
No. 3 Hexis AMR	5 kg (11 lb)

After a collision between the two Swiss Racing Team Lamborghini's at the Sachsenring round, the team decided to miss the Navarra round which is the second round in a row they have missed an event. Exim Bank Team China recruited Belgian driver Nico Verdonck for this round, replacing Andreas Zuber. He raced in three race weekends in 2010 for Triple H Team Hegersport. Nick Catsburg returned to GT1 after being replaced by Exim Bank Team China in the previous round. He was behind the wheel of the No. 20 Sumo Power Nissan, replacing Warren Hughes. Marc VDS recruited IndyCar Series driver Bertrand Baguette for this round, replacing Frédéric Makowiecki behind the wheel of car No. 41.

== Qualifying ==
=== Qualifying result ===
For qualifying, Driver 1 participates in the first and third sessions while Driver 2 participates in only the second session. The fastest lap for each session is indicated with bold.

Pos	No.	Driver 1	Team	Session 1	Session 2	Session 3	Grid
Pos	No.	Driver 2	Team	Session 1	Session 2	Session 3	Grid
1	38	(Germany) Marc Basseng	(Germany) All-Inkl.com Münnich Motorsport	1:36.872	1:36.852	1:36.579	1
1	38	(Germany) Markus Winkelhock	(Germany) All-Inkl.com Münnich Motorsport	1:36.872	1:36.852	1:36.579	1
2	37	(Germany) Dominik Schwager	(Germany) All-Inkl.com Münnich Motorsport	1:36.729	1:36.674	1:36.583	2
2	37	(Netherlands) Nicky Pastorelli	(Germany) All-Inkl.com Münnich Motorsport	1:36.729	1:36.674	1:36.583	2
3	11	(Netherlands) Mike Hezemans	Exim Bank Team China	1:37.323	1:37.223	1:37.108	3
3	11	(Belgium) Nico Verdonck	Exim Bank Team China	1:37.323	1:37.223	1:37.108	3
4	23	(Germany) Michael Krumm	(United Kingdom) JR Motorsports	1:37.400	1:37.319	1:37.310	4
4	23	(Germany) Lucas Luhr	(United Kingdom) JR Motorsports	1:37.400	1:37.319	1:37.310	4
5	21	(Australia) David Brabham	(United Kingdom) Sumo Power GT	1:37.555	1:37.232	1:37.380	5
5	21	(United Kingdom) Jamie Campbell-Walter	(United Kingdom) Sumo Power GT	1:37.555	1:37.232	1:37.380	5
6	3	(Monaco) Clivio Piccione	(France) Hexis AMR	1:37.701	1:37.205	1:37.620	6
6	3	(Netherlands) Stef Dusseldorp	(France) Hexis AMR	1:37.701	1:37.205	1:37.620	6
7	41	(Belgium) Maxime Martin	(Belgium) Marc VDS Racing Team	1:37.510	1:36.717	1:37.659	7
7	41	(Belgium) Bertrand Baguette	(Belgium) Marc VDS Racing Team	1:37.510	1:36.717	1:37.659	7
8	4	(Germany) Christian Hohenadel	(France) Hexis AMR	1:37.708	1:37.161	1:37.714	8
8	4	(Belgium) Maxime Martin	(France) Hexis AMR	1:37.708	1:37.161	1:37.714	8
9	20	(Brazil) Enrique Bernoldi	(United Kingdom) Sumo Power GT	1:37.634	1:37.378		9
9	20	(Netherlands) Nick Catsburg	(United Kingdom) Sumo Power GT	1:37.634	1:37.378		9
10	22	(United Kingdom) Peter Dumbreck	(United Kingdom) JR Motorsports	1:37.634	1:37.546		10
10	22	(United Kingdom) Richard Westbrook	(United Kingdom) JR Motorsports	1:37.634	1:37.546		10
11	40	(Belgium) Bas Leinders	(Belgium) Marc VDS Racing Team	1:37.578	1:37.568		11
11	40	(Germany) Marc Hennerici	(Belgium) Marc VDS Racing Team	1:37.578	1:37.568		11
12	7	(Czech Republic) Tomáš Enge	(Germany) Young Driver AMR	1:37.577	1:37.998		12
12	7	(Germany) Alex Müller	(Germany) Young Driver AMR	1:37.577	1:37.998		12
13	9	(Belgium) Vanina Ickx	(Belgium) Belgian Racing	1:37.807	1:38.800		13
13	9	(Denmark) Christoffer Nygaard	(Belgium) Belgian Racing	1:37.807	1:38.800		13
14	10	(France) Antoine Leclerc	(Belgium) Belgian Racing	1:37.483	1:39.070		14
14	10	(France) Yann Clairay	(Belgium) Belgian Racing	1:37.483	1:39.070		14
15	47	(France) Michaël Rossi	(Luxembourg) DKR Engineering	1:37.941			15
15	47	(France) Dimitri Enjalbert	(Luxembourg) DKR Engineering	1:37.941			15
16	8	(United Kingdom) Darren Turner	(Germany) Young Driver AMR	1:41.662			16
16	8	(Germany) Stefan Mücke	(Germany) Young Driver AMR	1:41.662			16

== Races ==
=== Qualifying Race ===
==== Race result ====
Pos	No.	Team	Drivers	Manufacturer	Laps	Time/Retired
1	38	(Germany) All-Inkl.com Münnich Motorsport	(Germany) Marc Basseng (Germany) Markus Winkelhock	Lamborghini	36	
2	37	(Germany) All-Inkl.com Münnich Motorsport	(Germany) Dominik Schwager (Netherlands) Nicky Pastorelli	Lamborghini	36	−3.304
3	41	(Belgium) Marc VDS Racing Team	(Belgium) Maxime Martin (Belgium) Bertrand Baguette	Ford	36	−20.390
4	21	(United Kingdom) Sumo Power GT	(Australia) David Brabham (United Kingdom) Jamie Campbell-Walter	Nissan	36	−27.711
5	4	(France) Hexis AMR	(Germany) Christian Hohenadel (Italy) Andrea Piccini	Aston Martin	36	−28.361
6	8	(Germany) Young Driver AMR	(United Kingdom) Darren Turner (Germany) Stefan Mücke	Aston Martin	36	−39.480
7	22	(United Kingdom) JR Motorsports	(United Kingdom) Peter Dumbreck (United Kingdom) Richard Westbrook	Nissan	36	−40.007
8	47	(Luxembourg) DKR Engineering	(France) Michaël Rossi (France) Dimitri Enjalbert	Corvette	36	−42.396
9	23	(United Kingdom) JR Motorsports	(Germany) Michael Krumm (Germany) Lucas Luhr	Nissan	36	−44.251
10	3	(France) Hexis AMR	(Monaco) Clivio Piccione (Netherlands) Stef Dusseldorp	Aston Martin	36	−46.335
11	9	(Belgium) Belgian Racing	(Belgium) Vanina Ickx (Denmark) Christoffer Nygaard	Ford	35	−1 lap
12 DNF	40	(Belgium) Marc VDS Racing Team	(Belgium) Bas Leinders (Germany) Marc Hennerici	Ford	31	Retired
13 DNF	20	(United Kingdom) Sumo Power GT	(Brazil) Enrique Bernoldi (Netherlands) Nick Catsburg	Nissan	24	Mechanical
14 DNF	7	(Germany) Young Driver AMR	(Czech Republic) Tomáš Enge (Germany) Alex Müller	Aston Martin	22	Retired
15 DNF	11	Exim Bank Team China	(Netherlands) Mike Hezemans (Belgium) Nico Verdonck	Corvette	18	Retired
16 DNF	10	(Belgium) Belgian Racing	(France) Antoine Leclerc (France) Yann Clairay	Ford	13	Retired

=== Championship Race ===
==== Race result ====
Pos	No.	Team	Drivers	Manufacturer	Laps	Time/Retired
1	37	(Germany) All-Inkl.com Münnich Motorsport	(Germany) Dominik Schwager (Netherlands) Nicky Pastorelli	Lamborghini	36	
2	38	(Germany) All-Inkl.com Münnich Motorsport	(Germany) Marc Basseng (Germany) Markus Winkelhock	Lamborghini	36	−2.328
3	21	(United Kingdom) Sumo Power GT	(Australia) David Brabham (United Kingdom) Jamie Campbell-Walter	Nissan	36	−3.735
4	41	(Belgium) Marc VDS Racing Team	(Belgium) Maxime Martin (Belgium) Bertrand Baguette	Ford	36	−7.488
5	4	(France) Hexis AMR	(Germany) Christian Hohenadel (Italy) Andrea Piccini	Aston Martin	36	−24.104
6	23	(United Kingdom) JR Motorsports	(Germany) Michael Krumm (Germany) Lucas Luhr	Nissan	36	−24.992
7	47	(Luxembourg) DKR Engineering	(France) Michaël Rossi (France) Dimitri Enjalbert	Corvette	36	−30.473
8	3	(France) Hexis AMR	(Monaco) Clivio Piccione (Netherlands) Stef Dusseldorp	Aston Martin	36	−31.773
9	22	(United Kingdom) JR Motorsports	(United Kingdom) Peter Dumbreck (United Kingdom) Richard Westbrook	Nissan	36	−35.573
10	40	(Belgium) Marc VDS Racing Team	(Belgium) Bas Leinders (Germany) Marc Hennerici	Ford	36	−35.974
11	9	(Belgium) Belgian Racing	(Belgium) Vanina Ickx (Denmark) Christoffer Nygaard	Ford	36	−53.177
12	20	(United Kingdom) Sumo Power GT	(Brazil) Enrique Bernoldi (Netherlands) Nick Catsburg	Nissan	36	−59.299
13	7	(Germany) Young Driver AMR	(Czech Republic) Tomáš Enge (Germany) Alex Müller	Aston Martin	35	−1 lap
14 DNF	10	(Belgium) Belgian Racing	(France) Antoine Leclerc (France) Yann Clairay	Ford	20	Retired
15 DNF	8	(Germany) Young Driver AMR	(United Kingdom) Darren Turner (Germany) Stefan Mücke	Aston Martin	19	Retired
16 DNF	11	Exim Bank Team China	(Netherlands) Mike Hezemans (Belgium) Nico Verdonck	Corvette	3	Gearbox

FIA GT1 World Championship
Previous race: RAC Tourist Trophy	2011 season	Next race: Paul Ricard
