= 2011 FIA GT1 Abu Dhabi round =

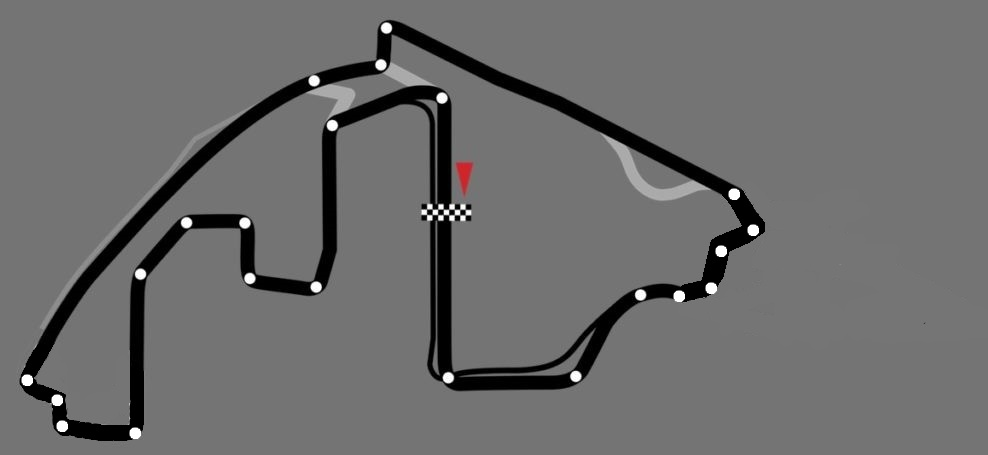
Yas Marina Circuit Corkscrew layout (2009–2021)

The 2011 FIA GT1 Abu Dhabi round was an auto racing event held at the Yas Marina Circuit in Abu Dhabi, United Arab Emirates. Taking place over 25–26 March 2011, Abu Dhabi was the opening round of the 2011 FIA GT1 World Championship season. It is the second consecutive year that FIA GT1 has opened its season in Abu Dhabi, although the 2011 event will be held on a shorter 4.730 km (2.939 mi) layout of the Yas Marina Circuit. Marc Hennerici is the only returning driver who won during the event last season, while Corvette and Ford both are defending victors. The event is also unique on the FIA GT1 calendar as it is the only one held over a two-day period rather than the normal three; Qualifying is held following Practice on Friday while the Qualifying Race and Championship race are both held on Saturday. The weekend is shared with a trio of local racing series: The UAE Sportscar series, the Cytech UAE GT series, and the Total UAE Touring Cars series.

Münnich Motorsport earned pole position in the qualifying session, only to be penalized for an infraction and handing pole to the Young Driver team of Stefan Mücke and Darren Turner. Early incidents in the Qualifying Race led to Marc VDS Ford winning their first GT1 race with Maxime Martin and Frédéric Makowiecki driving. Marc VDS was unable to hold the lead after starting from pole in the Championship Race as a quick pit stop vaulted Stef Dusseldorp and Clivio Piccione's Hexis Aston Martin into the race lead, fending off the Nissan of JR Motorsports but less than half a second at the finish.

== Background ==
Following the announcement of an entry list featuring twenty cars from ten teams for the full 2011 season, only eighteen were entered for Abu Dhabi. The two Corvette squads of Team China and DKR Engineering both entered only a single car due to each team lacking a second chassis. All eighteen cars participated in a pre-season test held at the circuit on 23 March, with the No. 37 Münnich Motorsport Lamborghini of Nicky Pastorelli and Dominik Schwager setting the fastest lap of the day, followed by their second team car.

== Qualifying ==
=== Qualifying result ===
For qualifying, Driver 1 participates in the first and third sessions while Driver 2 participates in only the second session. The fastest lap for each session is indicated with bold.

Pos	No.	Driver 1	Team	Session 1	Session 2	Session 3	Grid
Pos	No.	Driver 2	Team	Session 1	Session 2	Session 3	Grid
1	37	(Netherlands) Nicky Pastorelli	(Germany) All-Inkl.com Münnich Motorsport	1:52.705	1:52.006	1:51.668	6^{1}
1	37	(Germany) Dominik Schwager	(Germany) All-Inkl.com Münnich Motorsport	1:52.705	1:52.006	1:51.668	6^{1}
2	8	(Germany) Stefan Mücke	(Germany) Young Driver AMR	1:52.521	1:52.183	1:52.113	1
2	8	(United Kingdom) Darren Turner	(Germany) Young Driver AMR	1:52.521	1:52.183	1:52.113	1
3	41	(Belgium) Maxime Martin	(Belgium) Marc VDS Racing Team	1:52.820	1:52.603	1:52.197	2
3	41	(France) Frédéric Makowiecki	(Belgium) Marc VDS Racing Team	1:52.820	1:52.603	1:52.197	2
4	7	(Germany) Alex Müller	(Germany) Young Driver AMR	1:53.107	1:52.010	1:52.547	3
4	7	(Czech Republic) Tomáš Enge	(Germany) Young Driver AMR	1:53.107	1:52.010	1:52.547	3
5	11	(Netherlands) Mike Hezemans	Exim Bank Team China	1:52.892	1:52.521	1:52.750	4
5	11	(Netherlands) Nicky Catsburg	Exim Bank Team China	1:52.892	1:52.521	1:52.750	4
6	22	(United Kingdom) Peter Dumbreck	(United Kingdom) JR Motorsports	1:53.189	1:52.223	1:52.866	5
6	22	(United Kingdom) Richard Westbrook	(United Kingdom) JR Motorsports	1:53.189	1:52.223	1:52.866	5
7	20	(Brazil) Enrique Bernoldi	(United Kingdom) Sumo Power GT	1:52.909	1:52.631	1:53.191	7
7	20	(Brazil) Ricardo Zonta	(United Kingdom) Sumo Power GT	1:52.909	1:52.631	1:53.191	7
8	23	(Germany) Lucas Luhr	(United Kingdom) JR Motorsports	1:53.332	1:52.786	1:53.336	8
8	23	(Germany) Michael Krumm	(United Kingdom) JR Motorsports	1:53.332	1:52.786	1:53.336	8
9	21	(Australia) David Brabham	(United Kingdom) Sumo Power GT	1:52.667	1:52.804		9
9	21	(United Kingdom) Jamie Campbell-Walter	(United Kingdom) Sumo Power GT	1:52.667	1:52.804		9
10	5	(Austria) Karl Wendlinger	(Switzerland) Swiss Racing Team	1:53.355	1:52.907		10
10	5	(Netherlands) Peter Kox	(Switzerland) Swiss Racing Team	1:53.355	1:52.907		10
11	3	(Monaco) Clivio Piccione	(France) Hexis AMR	1:53.037	1:52.914		11
11	3	(Netherlands) Stef Dusseldorp	(France) Hexis AMR	1:53.037	1:52.914		11
12	40	(Germany) Marc Hennerici	(Belgium) Marc VDS Racing Team	1:53.114	1:53.159		17^{2}
12	40	(Belgium) Bas Leinders	(Belgium) Marc VDS Racing Team	1:53.114	1:53.159		17^{2}
13	47	(France) Michaël Rossi	(Luxembourg) DKR Engineering	1:53.830	1:55.549		12
13	47	(Brazil) Jaime Camara	(Luxembourg) DKR Engineering	1:53.830	1:55.549		12
14	38	(Germany) Markus Winkelhock	(Germany) All-Inkl.com Münnich Motorsport	1:53.486	No Time		13
14	38	(Germany) Marc Basseng	(Germany) All-Inkl.com Münnich Motorsport	1:53.486	No Time		13
15	4	(Germany) Christian Hohenadel	(France) Hexis AMR	1:54.178			14
15	4	(Italy) Andrea Piccini	(France) Hexis AMR	1:54.178			14
16	10	(Czech Republic) Martin Matzke	(Belgium) Belgian Racing	1:54.274			15
16	10	(Serbia) Miloš Pavlović	(Belgium) Belgian Racing	1:54.274			15
17	9	(France) Antoine Leclerc	(Belgium) Belgian Racing	1:54.564			16
17	9	(France) Fabien Giroix	(Belgium) Belgian Racing	1:54.564			16
18	6	(Sweden) Max Nilsson	(Switzerland) Swiss Racing Team	1:54.570			18
18	6	(Czech Republic) Jiří Janák	(Switzerland) Swiss Racing Team	1:54.570			18

1. The No. 37 Münnich Lamborghini was given a penalty of five grid spots for the Qualifying Race for ignoring a marshal's flag requiring the car to pits after illegally starting from an external battery during Qualifying 1.
2. The No. 40 Marc VDS Ford was given a penalty of five grid spots for the Qualifying Race for changing an engine during practice.

== Races ==
=== Qualifying Race ===
==== Race result ====
Pos	No.	Team	Drivers	Manufacturer	Laps	Time/Retired
1	41	(Belgium) Marc VDS Racing Team	(Belgium) Maxime Martin (France) Frédéric Makowiecki	Ford	31	
2	22	(United Kingdom) JR Motorsports	(United Kingdom) Peter Dumbreck (United Kingdom) Richard Westbrook	Nissan	31	−1.476
3	23	(United Kingdom) JR Motorsports	(Germany) Michael Krumm (Germany) Lucas Luhr	Nissan	31	−18.069
4	20	(United Kingdom) Sumo Power GT	(Brazil) Enrique Bernoldi (Brazil) Ricardo Zonta	Nissan	31	−21.514
5	3	(France) Hexis AMR	(Monaco) Clivio Piccione (Netherlands) Stef Dusseldorp	Aston Martin	31	−22.460
6	38	(Germany) All-Inkl.com Münnich Motorsport	(Germany) Marc Basseng (Germany) Markus Winkelhock	Lamborghini	31	−23.049
7	11	Exim Bank Team China	(Netherlands) Mike Hezemans (Netherlands) Nicky Catsburg	Corvette	31	−37.828
8	21	(United Kingdom) Sumo Power GT	(Australia) David Brabham (United Kingdom) Jamie Campbell-Walter	Nissan	31	−43.637
9	4	(France) Hexis AMR	(Germany) Christian Hohenadel (Italy) Andrea Piccini	Aston Martin	31	−48.575
10	5	(Switzerland) Swiss Racing Team	(Austria) Karl Wendlinger (Netherlands) Peter Kox	Lamborghini	31	−49.454
11	40	(Belgium) Marc VDS Racing Team	(Belgium) Bas Leinders (Germany) Marc Hennerici	Ford	31	−55.779
12	10	(Belgium) Belgian Racing	(Czech Republic) Martin Matzke (Serbia) Miloš Pavlović	Ford	31	−1:07.877
13	6	(Switzerland) Swiss Racing Team	(Sweden) Max Nilsson (Czech Republic) Jiří Janák	Lamborghini	31	−1:08.866
14	9	(Belgium) Belgian Racing	(France) Antoine Leclerc (France) Fabien Giroix	Ford	31	−1:49.703
15 DNF	8	(Germany) Young Driver AMR	(United Kingdom) Darren Turner (Germany) Stefan Mücke	Aston Martin	15	Broken wheel
16 DNF	7	(Germany) Young Driver AMR	(Czech Republic) Tomáš Enge (Germany) Alex Müller	Aston Martin	1	Damage
17 DNF	37	(Germany) All-Inkl.com Münnich Motorsport	(Netherlands) Nicky Pastorelli (Germany) Dominik Schwager	Lamborghini	0	Collision
18 DNF	47	(Luxembourg) DKR Engineering	(France) Michaël Rossi (Brazil) Jaime Camara	Corvette	0	Collision

=== Championship Race ===
==== Race result ====
Pos	No.	Team	Drivers	Manufacturer	Laps	Time/Retired
1	3	(France) Hexis AMR	(Monaco) Clivio Piccione (Netherlands) Stef Dusseldorp	Aston Martin	31	
2	22	(United Kingdom) JR Motorsports	(United Kingdom) Peter Dumbreck (United Kingdom) Richard Westbrook	Nissan	31	−0.474
3	38	(Germany) All-Inkl.com Münnich Motorsport	(Germany) Marc Basseng (Germany) Markus Winkelhock	Lamborghini	31	−14.539
4	4	(France) Hexis AMR	(Germany) Christian Hohenadel (Italy) Andrea Piccini	Aston Martin	31	−15.296
5	8	(Germany) Young Driver AMR	(United Kingdom) Darren Turner (Germany) Stefan Mücke	Aston Martin	31	−15.934
6	7	(Germany) Young Driver AMR	(Czech Republic) Tomáš Enge (Germany) Alex Müller	Aston Martin	31	−16.713
7	5	(Switzerland) Swiss Racing Team	(Austria) Karl Wendlinger (Netherlands) Peter Kox	Lamborghini	31	−17.277
8	41	(Belgium) Marc VDS Racing Team	(Belgium) Maxime Martin (France) Frédéric Makowiecki	Ford	31	−22.053
9	21	(United Kingdom) Sumo Power GT	(Australia) David Brabham (United Kingdom) Jamie Campbell-Walter	Nissan	31	−32.952
10	11	Exim Bank Team China	(Netherlands) Mike Hezemans (Netherlands) Nicky Catsburg	Corvette	31	−39.805
11	37	(Germany) All-Inkl.com Münnich Motorsport	(Netherlands) Nicky Pastorelli (Germany) Dominik Schwager	Lamborghini	31	−46.478
12	10	(Belgium) Belgian Racing	(Czech Republic) Martin Matzke (Serbia) Miloš Pavlović	Ford	31	−1:23.319
13	47	(Luxembourg) DKR Engineering	(France) Michaël Rossi (Brazil) Jaime Camara	Corvette	31	−1:38.366
14	23	(United Kingdom) JR Motorsports	(Germany) Michael Krumm (Germany) Lucas Luhr	Nissan	30	−1 Lap
15 DNF	6	(Switzerland) Swiss Racing Team	(Sweden) Max Nilsson (Czech Republic) Jiří Janák	Lamborghini	24	Retired
16 DNF	20	(United Kingdom) Sumo Power GT	(Brazil) Enrique Bernoldi (Brazil) Ricardo Zonta	Nissan	20	Retired
17 DNF	9	(Belgium) Belgian Racing	(France) Antoine Leclerc (France) Fabien Giroix	Ford	16	Retired
DNS	40	(Belgium) Marc VDS Racing Team	(Belgium) Bas Leinders (Germany) Marc Hennerici	Ford	–	Did Not Start

== Standings after the race ==
Drivers' Championship standings

Pos	Driver	Points
1=	(Monaco) Clivio Piccione	27
1=	(Netherlands) Stef Dusseldorp	27
3=	(United Kingdom) Peter Dumbreck	24
3=	(United Kingdom) Richard Westbrook	24
5=	(Germany) Marc Basseng	16
5=	(Germany) Markus Winkelhock	16

Teams' Championship standings

Pos	Constructor	Points
1	(France) Hexis AMR	39
2	(United Kingdom) JR Motorsports	28
3	(Germany) Young Driver AMR	18
4	(Germany) All-Inkl.com Münnich Motorsport	16
5	(Switzerland) Swiss Racing Team	6

- Note: Only the top five positions are included for both sets of standings.

FIA GT1 World Championship
Previous race: None	2011 season	Next race: Zolder
