= 2011 FIA GT1 San Luis round =

The Potrero de los Funes Circuit

The 2011 FIA GT1 San Luis round was an auto racing event held at the Potrero de los Funes Circuit, San Luis, Argentina on 4–6 November, and was the final round of the 2011 FIA GT1 World Championship season. It was the FIA GT1 World Championship's second race held in Argentina, a week after the 2010 San Luis round at the 6.270 km (3.896 mi) circuit. This event was supported by the TC 2000 Championship, Fiat Linea Competizione and the Argentine Formula Renault Championship.

== Background ==
Success Ballast
Entry	Ballast
No. 8 Young Driver AMR	55 kg (121 lb)
No. 41 Marc VDS Racing Team	35 kg (77 lb)
No. 7 Young Driver AMR	30 kg (66 lb)
No. 23 JR Motorsports	30 kg (66 lb)
No. 22 JR Motorsports	15 kg (33 lb)

Michael Krumm and Lucas Luhr went into this weekend as championship leaders in the Drivers Championship, eleven points ahead of Young Driver AMR drivers Darren Turner and Stefan Mücke. The Championship was up for grabs, as far down as sixth place Marc VDS driver Maxime Martin who was on 98 points and could have won the championship by winning the two races thus picking up 33 points and tying with Krumm and Luhr but only if the Germans either did not finish in the points or retired. Martin could winn the championship by picking up a possible six wins to Krumm and Luhr's four. In the Teams Championship, Young Driver AMR overtook JRM in the previous round at Beijing and led by eight points.

Markus Palttala replaced Yann Clairay for this round returning behind the wheel of the No. 10 Belgian Racing Ford GT after racing with the team at Silverstone. Clairay replaced Bertrand Baguette behind the wheel of the No. 41 Marc VDS car. Exim Bank Team China drafted in two new drivers Yelmer Buurman and Francesco Pastorelli for the Argentine round both making their FIA GT1 débuts replacing Ho-Pin Tung and Jeroen den Boer. Ricardo Risatti returned to the championship competing in the No. 40 Marc VDS Ford replacing Marc Hennerici. He made a cameo appearance in the San Luis round last season with Young Driver AMR. Christopher Haase also returns to the championship replacing Benjamin Leuenberger in the No. 47 DKR Lamborghini. The 2010 FIA GT3 champion raced for Reiter Engineering in the previous season.

== Qualifying ==
=== Qualifying result ===
For qualifying, Driver 1 participates in the first and third sessions while Driver 2 participates in only the second session. The fastest lap for each session is indicated with bold.

Pos	No.	Driver 1	Team	Session 1	Session 2	Session 3	Grid
Pos	No.	Driver 2	Team	Session 1	Session 2	Session 3	Grid
1	23	(Germany) Michael Krumm	(United Kingdom) JR Motorsports	2:15.008	2:00.947	2:14.233	1
1	23	(Germany) Lucas Luhr	(United Kingdom) JR Motorsports	2:15.008	2:00.947	2:14.233	1
2	11	(Netherlands) Yelmer Buurman	Exim Bank Team China	2:15.110	2:14.173	2:14.604	2
2	11	(Netherlands) Francesco Pastorelli	Exim Bank Team China	2:15.110	2:14.173	2:14.604	2
3	21	(Australia) David Brabham	(United Kingdom) Sumo Power GT	2:14.912	2:14.852	2:14.787	3
3	21	(Germany) Alex Müller	(United Kingdom) Sumo Power GT	2:14.912	2:14.852	2:14.787	3
4	22	(United Kingdom) Richard Westbrook	(United Kingdom) JR Motorsports	2:15.816	2:14.810	2:14.812	9
4	22	(United Kingdom) Peter Dumbreck	(United Kingdom) JR Motorsports	2:15.816	2:14.810	2:14.812	9
5	37	(Germany) Dominik Schwager	(Germany) All-Inkl.com Münnich Motorsport	2:14.762	2:14.277	2:14.891	4
5	37	(Netherlands) Nicky Pastorelli	(Germany) All-Inkl.com Münnich Motorsport	2:14.762	2:14.277	2:14.891	4
6	4	(Italy) Andrea Piccini	(France) Hexis AMR	2:15.416	2:14.716	2:15.059	5
6	4	(Germany) Christian Hohenadel	(France) Hexis AMR	2:15.416	2:14.716	2:15.059	5
7	20	(Brazil) Enrique Bernoldi	(United Kingdom) Sumo Power GT	2:15.666	2:14.901	2:15.452	6
7	20	(Netherlands) Nick Catsburg	(United Kingdom) Sumo Power GT	2:15.666	2:14.901	2:15.452	6
8	3	(Monaco) Clivio Piccione	(France) Hexis AMR	2:15.483	2:14.774	2:15.463	7
8	3	(Netherlands) Stef Dusseldorp	(France) Hexis AMR	2:15.483	2:14.774	2:15.463	7
9	7	(Czech Republic) Tomáš Enge	(Germany) Young Driver AMR	2:15.645	2:15.351		8
9	7	(Germany) Alex Müller	(Germany) Young Driver AMR	2:15.645	2:15.351		8
10	38	(Germany) Marc Basseng	(Germany) All-Inkl.com Münnich Motorsport	2:15.138	2:15.572		10
10	38	(Germany) Markus Winkelhock	(Germany) All-Inkl.com Münnich Motorsport	2:15.138	2:15.572		10
11	40	(Belgium) Bas Leinders	(Belgium) Marc VDS Racing Team	2:16.463	2:15.615		11
11	40	(Argentina) Ricardo Risatti	(Belgium) Marc VDS Racing Team	2:16.463	2:15.615		11
12	47	(Germany) Manuel Lauck	(Luxembourg) DKR www-discount.de	2:15.535	2:15.669		12
12	47	(Germany) Christopher Haase	(Luxembourg) DKR www-discount.de	2:15.535	2:15.669		12
13	10	(Finland) Markus Palttala	(Belgium) Belgian Racing	2:15.856	2:16.145		13
13	10	(France) Antoine Leclerc	(Belgium) Belgian Racing	2:15.856	2:16.145		13
14	41	(Belgium) Maxime Martin	(Belgium) Marc VDS Racing Team	2:16.091	2:16.395		18
14	41	(France) Yann Clairay	(Belgium) Marc VDS Racing Team	2:16.091	2:16.395		18
15	12	(France) Michaël Rossi	Exim Bank Team China	2:16.514			14
15	12	(Belgium) Nico Verdonck	Exim Bank Team China	2:16.514			14
16	48	(United Kingdom) Jonathan Kennard	(Luxembourg) DKR www-discount.de	2:16.678			15
16	48	(Germany) Christopher Brück	(Luxembourg) DKR www-discount.de	2:16.678			15
17	9	(Denmark) Christoffer Nygaard	(Belgium) Belgian Racing	2:16.833			16
17	9	(Switzerland) Jonathan Hirschi	(Belgium) Belgian Racing	2:16.833			16
18	8	(United Kingdom) Darren Turner	(Germany) Young Driver AMR	No Time			17
18	8	(Germany) Stefan Mücke	(Germany) Young Driver AMR	No Time			17

== Races ==
=== Qualifying Race ===
The Qualifying race saw Michael Krumm and Lucas Luhr win the Drivers Championship with the Championship Race still to run. They finished in second place behind the No. 11 Corvette with nearest rivals Turner and Mücke not starting the race due to an accident in pre-qualifying. The Corvette pairing of Buurman and Pastorelli won on their début outing in the GT1 World Championship. The Teams Championship was still up for grabs going into the Championship Race with Young Driver AMR leading over JRM by three points.

==== Race result ====
Pos	No.	Team	Drivers	Manufacturer	Laps	Time/Retired
1	11	Exim Bank Team China	(Netherlands) Yelmer Buurman (Netherlands) Francesco Pastorelli	Corvette	26	
2	23	(United Kingdom) JR Motorsports	(Germany) Michael Krumm (Germany) Lucas Luhr	Nissan	26	−0.316
3	37	(Germany) All-Inkl.com Münnich Motorsport	(Germany) Dominik Schwager (Netherlands) Nicky Pastorelli	Lamborghini	26	−17.054
4	20	(United Kingdom) Sumo Power GT	(Brazil) Enrique Bernoldi (Netherlands) Nick Catsburg	Nissan	26	−17.406
5	7	(Germany) Young Driver AMR	(Czech Republic) Tomáš Enge (Germany) Alex Müller	Aston Martin	26	−20.311
6	38	(Germany) All-Inkl.com Münnich Motorsport	(Germany) Marc Basseng (Germany) Markus Winkelhock	Lamborghini	26	−21.751
7	21	(United Kingdom) Sumo Power GT	(Australia) David Brabham (United Kingdom) Jamie Campbell-Walter	Nissan	26	−22.919
8	3	(France) Hexis AMR	(Monaco) Clivio Piccione (Netherlands) Stef Dusseldorp	Aston Martin	26	−24.404
9	47	(Luxembourg) DKR www-discount.de	(Germany) Manuel Lauck (Germany) Christopher Haase	Lamborghini	26	−43.562
10	10	(Belgium) Belgian Racing	(Finland) Markus Palttala (France) Antoine Leclerc	Ford	26	−50.890
11	12	Exim Bank Team China	(France) Michaël Rossi (Belgium) Nico Verdonck	Corvette	26	−57.282
12	9	(Belgium) Belgian Racing	(Denmark) Christoffer Nygaard (Switzerland) Jonathan Hirschi	Ford	26	−1:14.414
13	48	(Luxembourg) DKR www-discount.de	(United Kingdom) Jonathan Kennard (Germany) Christopher Brück	Lamborghini	26	−1:30.464
14	4	(France) Hexis AMR	(Italy) Andrea Piccini (Germany) Christian Hohenadel	Aston Martin	24	+2 laps
15	41	(Belgium) Marc VDS Racing Team	(Belgium) Maxime Martin (France) Yann Clairay	Ford	21	+5 laps
16 NC	22	(United Kingdom) JR Motorsports	(United Kingdom) Richard Westbrook (United Kingdom) Peter Dumbreck	Nissan	9	Not Classified
17 DNF	40	(Belgium) Marc VDS Racing Team	(Belgium) Bas Leinders (Argentina) Ricardo Risatti	Ford	1	Contact
DNS	8	(Germany) Young Driver AMR	(United Kingdom) Darren Turner (Germany) Stefan Mücke	Aston Martin	–	Damage

=== Championship Race ===
The Championship Race immediately started in chaos with a 5-way crash as soon as the race went underway. One of the cars involved was the No. 23 car which was the Drivers Championship-winning car and also the first and only retirement for that car in the season. Other cars involved were the two All-Inkl Lamborghini's, the No. 48 DKR Lamborghini and the No. 21 Sumo Power Nissan. The Championship Race was won by Qualifying Race winners Buurman and Pastorelli and was the first and only Championship Race win for the Corvette brand. JR Motorsports overtook Young Driver AMR in the Teams Championship by one point but the Championship was won by Hexis AMR who grabbed up 25 points in the Championship race and overtook the two teams. Hexis won the Teams Championship by three points.

==== Race result ====
Pos	No.	Team	Drivers	Manufacturer	Laps	Time/Retired
1	11	Exim Bank Team China	(Netherlands) Yelmer Buurman (Netherlands) Francesco Pastorelli	Corvette	22	
2	47	(Luxembourg) DKR www-discount.de	(Germany) Manuel Lauck (Germany) Christopher Haase	Lamborghini	22	−4.043
3	3	(France) Hexis AMR	(Monaco) Clivio Piccione (Netherlands) Stef Dusseldorp	Aston Martin	22	−13.224
4	20	(United Kingdom) Sumo Power GT	(Brazil) Enrique Bernoldi (Netherlands) Nick Catsburg	Nissan	22	−21.189
5	4	(France) Hexis AMR	(Italy) Andrea Piccini (Germany) Christian Hohenadel	Aston Martin	22	−24.786
6	10	(Belgium) Belgian Racing	(Finland) Markus Palttala (France) Antoine Leclerc	Ford	22	−29.243
7	9	(Belgium) Belgian Racing	(Denmark) Christoffer Nygaard (Switzerland) Jonathan Hirschi	Ford	22	−30.790
8	22	(United Kingdom) JR Motorsports	(United Kingdom) Richard Westbrook (United Kingdom) Peter Dumbreck	Nissan	22	−32.386
9	40	(Belgium) Marc VDS Racing Team	(Belgium) Bas Leinders (Argentina) Ricardo Risatti	Ford	22	−34.467
10	7	(Germany) Young Driver AMR	(Czech Republic) Tomáš Enge (Germany) Alex Müller	Aston Martin	22	−35.269
11	41	(Belgium) Marc VDS Racing Team	(Belgium) Maxime Martin (France) Yann Clairay	Ford	21	+1 lap
12 DNF	12	Exim Bank Team China	(France) Michaël Rossi (Belgium) Nico Verdonck	Corvette	6	Retired
13 DNF	21	(United Kingdom) Sumo Power GT	(Australia) David Brabham (United Kingdom) Jamie Campbell-Walter	Nissan	0	Collision
14 DNF	23	(United Kingdom) JR Motorsports	(Germany) Michael Krumm (Germany) Lucas Luhr	Nissan	0	Collision
15 DNF	37	(Germany) All-Inkl.com Münnich Motorsport	(Germany) Dominik Schwager (Netherlands) Nicky Pastorelli	Lamborghini	0	Collision
16 DNF	38	(Germany) All-Inkl.com Münnich Motorsport	(Germany) Marc Basseng (Germany) Markus Winkelhock	Lamborghini	0	Collision
17 DNF	48	(Luxembourg) DKR www-discount.de	(United Kingdom) Jonathan Kennard (Germany) Christopher Brück	Lamborghini	0	Collision
DNS	8	(Germany) Young Driver AMR	(United Kingdom) Darren Turner (Germany) Stefan Mücke	Aston Martin	–	Damage

FIA GT1 World Championship
Previous race: Beijing	2011 season	Next race: None
