= 2011 FIA GT1 Paul Ricard round =

Circuit Paul Ricard (1C-V2)

The 2011 FIA GT1 Paul Ricard round is an auto racing event held at the Circuit Paul Ricard, Le Castellet, France on 15–17 July, and was the seventh round of the 2011 FIA GT1 World Championship season. It was the FIA GT1 World Championship's second race held at the 5.842 km (3.630 mi) Paul Ricard. The event was supported by the FIA GT3 European Championship, Lamborghini Blancpain Super Trofeo and British Formula 3 Championship.

== Background ==
Success Ballast
Entry	Ballast
No. 37 All-Inkl.com Münnich Motorsport	35 kg (77 lb)
No. 38 All-Inkl.com Münnich Motorsport	30 kg (66 lb)
No. 23 JR Motorsports	20 kg (44 lb)
No. 21 Sumo Power GT	10 kg (22 lb)
No. 41 Marc VDS Racing Team	5 kg (11 lb)

The team of Marc VDS Racing Team who run four Ford GT's were doubtful to run in this round as engine supply issues could have forced them to miss the Paul Ricard round, meaning there could have been just twelve cars competing. After a collision between the two Swiss Racing Team Lamborghini's at the Sachsenring round, the team were scheduled to return at this event with one car but then decided to withdraw it from the third event in a row. Andreas Zuber is back behind the wheel of the No. 11 Exim Bank Corvette alongside regular Mike Hezemans. Frédéric Makowiecki also returns for Marc VDS Racing Team competing with Maxime Martin in car No. 41 replacing Bertrand Baguette.

== Qualifying ==
=== Qualifying result ===
For qualifying, Driver 1 participates in the first and third sessions while Driver 2 participates in only the second session. The fastest lap for each session is indicated with bold.

Pos	No.	Driver 1	Team	Session 1	Session 2	Session 3	Grid
Pos	No.	Driver 2	Team	Session 1	Session 2	Session 3	Grid
1	22	(United Kingdom) Peter Dumbreck	(United Kingdom) JR Motorsports	2:04.097	2:03.583	2:03.419	1
1	22	(United Kingdom) Richard Westbrook	(United Kingdom) JR Motorsports	2:04.097	2:03.583	2:03.419	1
2	23	(Germany) Michael Krumm	(United Kingdom) JR Motorsports	2:03.386	2:04.070	2:03.498	2
2	23	(Germany) Lucas Luhr	(United Kingdom) JR Motorsports	2:03.386	2:04.070	2:03.498	2
3	7	(Czech Republic) Tomáš Enge	(Germany) Young Driver AMR	2:04.397	2:03.752	2:03.772	3
3	7	(Germany) Alex Müller	(Germany) Young Driver AMR	2:04.397	2:03.752	2:03.772	3
4	21	(Australia) David Brabham	(United Kingdom) Sumo Power GT	2:05.015	2:04.054	2:03.800	4
4	21	(United Kingdom) Jamie Campbell-Walter	(United Kingdom) Sumo Power GT	2:05.015	2:04.054	2:03.800	4
5	8	(United Kingdom) Darren Turner	(Germany) Young Driver AMR	2:04.002	2:03.435	2:03.840	5
5	8	(Germany) Stefan Mücke	(Germany) Young Driver AMR	2:04.002	2:03.435	2:03.840	5
6	4	(Germany) Christian Hohenadel	(France) Hexis AMR	2:04.566	2:04.044	2:03.963	16
6	4	(Italy) Andrea Piccini	(France) Hexis AMR	2:04.566	2:04.044	2:03.963	16
7	11	(Netherlands) Mike Hezemans	Exim Bank Team China	2:03.973	2:03.493	2:04.137	6
7	11	(Austria) Andreas Zuber	Exim Bank Team China	2:03.973	2:03.493	2:04.137	6
8	37	(Germany) Dominik Schwager	(Germany) All-Inkl.com Münnich Motorsport	2:04.792	2:04.072	2:04.298	7
8	37	(Netherlands) Nicky Pastorelli	(Germany) All-Inkl.com Münnich Motorsport	2:04.792	2:04.072	2:04.298	7
9	41	(Belgium) Maxime Martin	(Belgium) Marc VDS Racing Team	2:04.584	2:04.080		8
9	41	(France) Frédéric Makowiecki	(Belgium) Marc VDS Racing Team	2:04.584	2:04.080		8
10	3	(Monaco) Clivio Piccione	(France) Hexis AMR	2:04.503	2:04.204		9
10	3	(Netherlands) Stef Dusseldorp	(France) Hexis AMR	2:04.503	2:04.204		9
11	47	(France) Michaël Rossi	(Luxembourg) DKR Engineering	2:04.630	2:04.293		10
11	47	(France) Dimitri Enjalbert	(Luxembourg) DKR Engineering	2:04.630	2:04.293		10
12	20	(Brazil) Enrique Bernoldi	(United Kingdom) Sumo Power GT	2:04.531	2:04.494		11
12	20	(Netherlands) Nick Catsburg	(United Kingdom) Sumo Power GT	2:04.531	2:04.494		11
13	40	(Belgium) Bas Leinders	(Belgium) Marc VDS Racing Team	2:05.024	2:04.766		12
13	40	(Germany) Marc Hennerici	(Belgium) Marc VDS Racing Team	2:05.024	2:04.766		12
14	38	(Germany) Marc Basseng	(Germany) All-Inkl.com Münnich Motorsport	2:06.579	2:05.060		13
14	38	(Germany) Markus Winkelhock	(Germany) All-Inkl.com Münnich Motorsport	2:06.579	2:05.060		13
15	9	(Belgium) Vanina Ickx	(Belgium) Belgian Racing	2:07.219			14
15	9	(Denmark) Christoffer Nygaard	(Belgium) Belgian Racing	2:07.219			14
16	10	(France) Antoine Leclerc	(Belgium) Belgian Racing	No Time			15
16	10	(France) Yann Clairay	(Belgium) Belgian Racing	No Time			15

== Races ==
=== Qualifying Race ===
==== Race result ====
Pos	No.	Team	Drivers	Manufacturer	Laps	Time/Retired
1	23	(United Kingdom) JR Motorsports	(Germany) Michael Krumm (Germany) Lucas Luhr	Nissan	27	
2	7	(Germany) Young Driver AMR	(Czech Republic) Tomáš Enge (Germany) Alex Müller	Aston Martin	27	−8.350
3	8	(Germany) Young Driver AMR	(United Kingdom) Darren Turner (Germany) Stefan Mücke	Aston Martin	27	−9.406
4	22	(United Kingdom) JR Motorsports	(United Kingdom) Peter Dumbreck (United Kingdom) Richard Westbrook	Nissan	27	−10.375
5	41	(Belgium) Marc VDS Racing Team	(Belgium) Maxime Martin (France) Frédéric Makowiecki	Ford	27	−17.171
6	4	(France) Hexis AMR	(Germany) Christian Hohenadel (Italy) Andrea Piccini	Aston Martin	27	−21.142
7	38	(Germany) All-Inkl.com Münnich Motorsport	(Germany) Marc Basseng (Germany) Markus Winkelhock	Lamborghini	27	−23.547
8	47	(Luxembourg) DKR Engineering	(France) Michaël Rossi (France) Dimitri Enjalbert	Corvette	27	−25.986
9	20	(United Kingdom) Sumo Power GT	(Brazil) Enrique Bernoldi (Netherlands) Nick Catsburg	Nissan	27	−37.111
10	21	(United Kingdom) Sumo Power GT	(Australia) David Brabham (United Kingdom) Jamie Campbell-Walter	Nissan	27	−58.282
11 DNF	11	Exim Bank Team China	(Netherlands) Mike Hezemans (Austria) Andreas Zuber	Corvette	17	Retired
12 DNF	37	(Germany) All-Inkl.com Münnich Motorsport	(Germany) Dominik Schwager (Netherlands) Nicky Pastorelli	Lamborghini	15	Engine
13 DNF	10	(Belgium) Belgian Racing	(France) Antoine Leclerc (France) Yann Clairay	Ford	15	Retired
14 DNF	40	(Belgium) Marc VDS Racing Team	(Belgium) Bas Leinders (Germany) Marc Hennerici	Ford	4	Damage
15 DNF	9	(Belgium) Belgian Racing	(Belgium) Vanina Ickx (Denmark) Christoffer Nygaard	Ford	3	Retired
16 DNF	3	(France) Hexis AMR	(Monaco) Clivio Piccione (Netherlands) Stef Dusseldorp	Aston Martin	2	Collision

=== Championship Race ===
==== Race result ====
Pos	No.	Team	Drivers	Manufacturer	Laps	Time/Retired
1	23	(United Kingdom) JR Motorsports	(Germany) Michael Krumm (Germany) Lucas Luhr	Nissan	29	
2	8	(Germany) Young Driver AMR	(United Kingdom) Darren Turner (Germany) Stefan Mücke	Aston Martin	29	−0.843
3	7	(Germany) Young Driver AMR	(Czech Republic) Tomáš Enge (Germany) Alex Müller	Aston Martin	29	−11.602
4	21	(United Kingdom) Sumo Power GT	(Australia) David Brabham (United Kingdom) Jamie Campbell-Walter	Nissan	29	−12.232
5	4	(France) Hexis AMR	(Germany) Christian Hohenadel (Italy) Andrea Piccini	Aston Martin	29	−13.832
6	41	(Belgium) Marc VDS Racing Team	(Belgium) Maxime Martin (France) Frédéric Makowiecki	Ford	29	−14.730
7	20	(United Kingdom) Sumo Power GT	(Brazil) Enrique Bernoldi (Netherlands) Nick Catsburg	Nissan	29	−27.576
8	38	(Germany) All-Inkl.com Münnich Motorsport	(Germany) Marc Basseng (Germany) Markus Winkelhock	Lamborghini	29	−28.140
9	37	(Germany) All-Inkl.com Münnich Motorsport	(Germany) Dominik Schwager (Netherlands) Nicky Pastorelli	Lamborghini	29	−34.725
10	47	(Luxembourg) DKR Engineering	(France) Michaël Rossi (France) Dimitri Enjalbert	Corvette	29	−37.893
11	3	(France) Hexis AMR	(Monaco) Clivio Piccione (Netherlands) Stef Dusseldorp	Aston Martin	29	−39.835
12	40	(Belgium) Marc VDS Racing Team	(Belgium) Bas Leinders (Germany) Marc Hennerici	Ford	29	−40.429
13	9	(Belgium) Belgian Racing	(Belgium) Vanina Ickx (Denmark) Christoffer Nygaard	Ford	28	−1 lap
14 DNF	22	(United Kingdom) JR Motorsports	(United Kingdom) Peter Dumbreck (United Kingdom) Richard Westbrook	Nissan	26	Retired
15 DNF	10	(Belgium) Belgian Racing	(France) Antoine Leclerc (France) Yann Clairay	Ford	16	Steering
16 DNF	11	Exim Bank Team China	(Netherlands) Mike Hezemans (Austria) Andreas Zuber	Corvette	0	Steering

FIA GT1 World Championship
Previous race: Navarra	2011 season	Next race: Ordos
