= 2011 FIA GT1 Ordos round =

Ordos International Circuit

The 2011 FIA GT1 Ordos round was an auto racing event held at the Ordos International Circuit, Ordos City, China on 2–4 September, and was the eighth round of the 2011 FIA GT1 World Championship season. It was the FIA GT1 World Championship's first race held in China, as well as at the 3.751 km (2.331 mi) Ordos. The event was supported by Formula Pilota, and the overall event was held under the title of the Kangbashi Cup.

== Background ==
Success Ballast
Entry	Ballast
No. 23 JR Motorsports	60 kg (130 lb)
No. 8 Young Driver AMR	20 kg (44 lb)
No. 7 Young Driver AMR	15 kg (33 lb)
No. 21 Sumo Power GT	5 kg (11 lb)

This was the home round of Exim Bank Team China who ran two Corvettes for the first time this season with four all new drivers including Chinese racer Ho-Pin Tung.

DKR Engineering replaced their single Corvette with two Lamborghini's for this round and also with four new drivers. Jonathan Hirschi replaced Vanina Ickx in the No. 9 Belgian Racing Ford GT alongside regular Christoffer Nygaard.

== Qualifying ==
=== Qualifying result ===
For qualifying, Driver 1 participates in the first and third sessions while Driver 2 participates in only the second session. The fastest lap for each session is indicated with bold.

Pos	No.	Driver 1	Team	Session 1	Session 2	Session 3	Grid
Pos	No.	Driver 2	Team	Session 1	Session 2	Session 3	Grid
1	41	(Belgium) Maxime Martin	(Belgium) Marc VDS Racing Team	1:38.940	1:38.811	1:38.535	1
1	41	(France) Frédéric Makowiecki	(Belgium) Marc VDS Racing Team	1:38.940	1:38.811	1:38.535	1
2	22	(United Kingdom) Peter Dumbreck	(United Kingdom) JR Motorsports	1:39.001	1:38.769	1:38.669	2
2	22	(United Kingdom) Richard Westbrook	(United Kingdom) JR Motorsports	1:39.001	1:38.769	1:38.669	2
3	38	(Germany) Marc Basseng	(Germany) All-Inkl.com Münnich Motorsport	1:39.270	1:39.095	1:38.768	3
3	38	(Germany) Markus Winkelhock	(Germany) All-Inkl.com Münnich Motorsport	1:39.270	1:39.095	1:38.768	3
4	20	(Brazil) Enrique Bernoldi	(United Kingdom) Sumo Power GT	1:39.603	1:38.843	1:38.909	4
4	20	(Netherlands) Nick Catsburg	(United Kingdom) Sumo Power GT	1:39.603	1:38.843	1:38.909	4
5	21	(Australia) David Brabham	(United Kingdom) Sumo Power GT	1:39.289	1:38.854	1:39.222	5
5	21	(United Kingdom) Jamie Campbell-Walter	(United Kingdom) Sumo Power GT	1:39.289	1:38.854	1:39.222	5
6	7	(Czech Republic) Tomáš Enge	(Germany) Young Driver AMR	1:39.506	1:39.139	1:39.543	6
6	7	(Germany) Alex Müller	(Germany) Young Driver AMR	1:39.506	1:39.139	1:39.543	6
7	23	(Germany) Michael Krumm	(United Kingdom) JR Motorsports	1:39.849	1:39.061	1:39.561	7
7	23	(Germany) Lucas Luhr	(United Kingdom) JR Motorsports	1:39.849	1:39.061	1:39.561	7
8	37	(Germany) Dominik Schwager	(Germany) All-Inkl.com Münnich Motorsport	1:40.201	1:38.823	1:40.002	8
8	37	(Netherlands) Nicky Pastorelli	(Germany) All-Inkl.com Münnich Motorsport	1:40.201	1:38.823	1:40.002	8
9	3	(Netherlands) Stef Dusseldorp	(France) Hexis AMR	1:39.116	1:39.141		9
9	3	(Monaco) Clivio Piccione	(France) Hexis AMR	1:39.116	1:39.141		9
10	4	(Italy) Andrea Piccini	(France) Hexis AMR	1:39.495	1:39.281		10
10	4	(Germany) Christian Hohenadel	(France) Hexis AMR	1:39.495	1:39.281		10
11	12	(France) Michaël Rossi	Exim Bank Team China	1:39.585	1:39.290		10
11	12	(Brazil) Sérgio Jimenez	Exim Bank Team China	1:39.585	1:39.290		10
12	9	(Denmark) Christoffer Nygaard	(Belgium) Belgian Racing	1:39.401	1:39.383		11
12	9	(Switzerland) Jonathan Hirschi	(Belgium) Belgian Racing	1:39.401	1:39.383		11
13	8	(Germany) Stefan Mücke	(Germany) Young Driver AMR	1:39.210	1:39.466		13
13	8	(United Kingdom) Darren Turner	(Germany) Young Driver AMR	1:39.210	1:39.466		13
14	10	(France) Yann Clairay	(Belgium) Belgian Racing	1:39.386	1:39.809		14
14	10	(France) Antoine Leclerc	(Belgium) Belgian Racing	1:39.386	1:39.809		14
15	11	(China) Ho-Pin Tung	Exim Bank Team China	1:40.204			15
15	11	(Netherlands) Jeroen den Boer	Exim Bank Team China	1:40.204			15
16	40	(Belgium) Bas Leinders	(Belgium) Marc VDS Racing Team	1:40.420			16
16	40	(Germany) Marc Hennerici	(Belgium) Marc VDS Racing Team	1:40.420			16
17	47	(Switzerland) Benjamin Leuenberger	(Luxembourg) DKR www-discount.de	1:40.642			17
17	47	(Germany) Manuel Lauck	(Luxembourg) DKR www-discount.de	1:40.642			17
18	48	(United Kingdom) Jonathan Kennard	(Luxembourg) DKR www-discount.de	1:42.683			18
18	48	(Germany) Christopher Brück	(Luxembourg) DKR www-discount.de	1:42.683			18

== Races ==
=== Qualifying Race ===
==== Race result ====
Pos	No.	Team	Drivers	Manufacturer	Laps	Time/Retired
1	41	(Belgium) Marc VDS Racing Team	(Belgium) Maxime Martin (France) Frédéric Makowiecki	Ford	36	
2	22	(United Kingdom) JR Motorsports	(United Kingdom) Peter Dumbreck (United Kingdom) Richard Westbrook	Nissan	36	−1.725
3	21	(United Kingdom) Sumo Power GT	(Australia) David Brabham (United Kingdom) Jamie Campbell-Walter	Nissan	36	−28.807
4	3	(France) Hexis AMR	(Netherlands) Stef Dusseldorp (Monaco) Clivio Piccione	Aston Martin	36	−39.768
5	20	(United Kingdom) Sumo Power GT	(Brazil) Enrique Bernoldi (Netherlands) Nick Catsburg	Nissan	36	−43.274
6	37	(Germany) All-Inkl.com Münnich Motorsport	(Germany) Dominik Schwager (Netherlands) Nicky Pastorelli	Lamborghini	36	−49.182
7	8	(Germany) Young Driver AMR	(Germany) Stefan Mücke (United Kingdom) Darren Turner	Aston Martin	36	−49.817
8	4	(France) Hexis AMR	(Italy) Andrea Piccini (Germany) Christian Hohenadel	Aston Martin	36	−50.048
9	9	(Belgium) Belgian Racing	(Denmark) Christoffer Nygaard (Switzerland) Jonathan Hirschi	Ford	36	−58.341
10	40	(Belgium) Marc VDS Racing Team	(Belgium) Bas Leinders (Germany) Marc Hennerici	Ford	36	−1:04.180
11	23	(United Kingdom) JR Motorsports	(Germany) Michael Krumm (Germany) Lucas Luhr	Nissan	36	1:15.794
12	47	(Luxembourg) DKR www-discount.de	(Switzerland) Benjamin Leuenberger (Germany) Manuel Lauck	Lamborghini	35	+1 lap
13	10	(Belgium) Belgian Racing	(France) Yann Clairay (France) Antoine Leclerc	Ford	35	+1 lap
14	48	(Luxembourg) DKR www-discount.de	(United Kingdom) Jonathan Kennard (Germany) Christopher Brück	Lamborghini	33	+3 laps
15 DNF	12	Exim Bank Team China	(France) Michaël Rossi (Brazil) Sérgio Jimenez	Corvette	32	Retired
16	7	(Germany) Young Driver AMR	(Czech Republic) Tomáš Enge (Germany) Alex Müller	Aston Martin	30	+6 laps
17 DNF	11	Exim Bank Team China	(China) Ho-Pin Tung (Netherlands) Jeroen den Boer	Corvette	2	Retired
EX	38	(Germany) All-Inkl.com Münnich Motorsport	(Germany) Marc Basseng (Germany) Markus Winkelhock	Lamborghini	36	

=== Championship Race ===
==== Race result ====
Pos	No.	Team	Drivers	Manufacturer	Laps	Time/Retired
1	41	(Belgium) Marc VDS Racing Team	(Belgium) Maxime Martin (France) Frédéric Makowiecki	Ford	34	
2	22	(United Kingdom) JR Motorsports	(United Kingdom) Peter Dumbreck (United Kingdom) Richard Westbrook	Nissan	34	−0.786
3	3	(France) Hexis AMR	(Netherlands) Stef Dusseldorp (Monaco) Clivio Piccione	Aston Martin	34	−5.570
4	4	(France) Hexis AMR	(Italy) Andrea Piccini (Germany) Christian Hohenadel	Aston Martin	34	−9.909
5	8	(Germany) Young Driver AMR	(Germany) Stefan Mücke (United Kingdom) Darren Turner	Aston Martin	34	−11.397
6	37	(Germany) All-Inkl.com Münnich Motorsport	(Germany) Dominik Schwager (Netherlands) Nicky Pastorelli	Lamborghini	34	−12.031
7	21	(United Kingdom) Sumo Power GT	(Australia) David Brabham (United Kingdom) Jamie Campbell-Walter	Nissan	34	−12.274
8	38	(Germany) All-Inkl.com Münnich Motorsport	(Germany) Marc Basseng (Germany) Markus Winkelhock	Lamborghini	34	−14.591
9	23	(United Kingdom) JR Motorsports	(Germany) Michael Krumm (Germany) Lucas Luhr	Nissan	34	−14.868
10	40	(Belgium) Marc VDS Racing Team	(Belgium) Bas Leinders (Germany) Marc Hennerici	Ford	36	−20.321
11	10	(Belgium) Belgian Racing	(France) Yann Clairay (France) Antoine Leclerc	Ford	34	−20.324
12	11	Exim Bank Team China	(China) Ho-Pin Tung (Netherlands) Jeroen den Boer	Corvette	34	−20.713
13	48	(Luxembourg) DKR www-discount.de	(United Kingdom) Jonathan Kennard (Germany) Christopher Brück	Lamborghini	34	−23.698
14	7	(Germany) Young Driver AMR	(Czech Republic) Tomáš Enge (Germany) Alex Müller	Aston Martin	34	−25.153
15	47	(Luxembourg) DKR www-discount.de	(Switzerland) Benjamin Leuenberger (Germany) Michael Lauck	Lamborghini	34	−26.056
16	12	Exim Bank Team China	(France) Michaël Rossi (Brazil) Sérgio Jimenez	Corvette	34	−30.159
17 DNF	9	(Belgium) Belgian Racing	(Denmark) Christoffer Nygaard (Switzerland) Jonathan Hirschi	Ford	13	Damage
18 DNF	20	(United Kingdom) Sumo Power GT	(Brazil) Enrique Bernoldi (Netherlands) Nick Catsburg	Nissan	2	Spun

FIA GT1 World Championship
Previous race: Paul Ricard	2011 season	Next race: Beijing
