= Fischer Racing =

German auto racing team

(Germany) Fischer Racing
- Founded: 2006
- Team principal(s): Erhard Fischer
- Current series: ADAC GT Masters
- Former series: SEAT León Supercopa; FIA GT1 World Championship; FIA GT3 European Championship

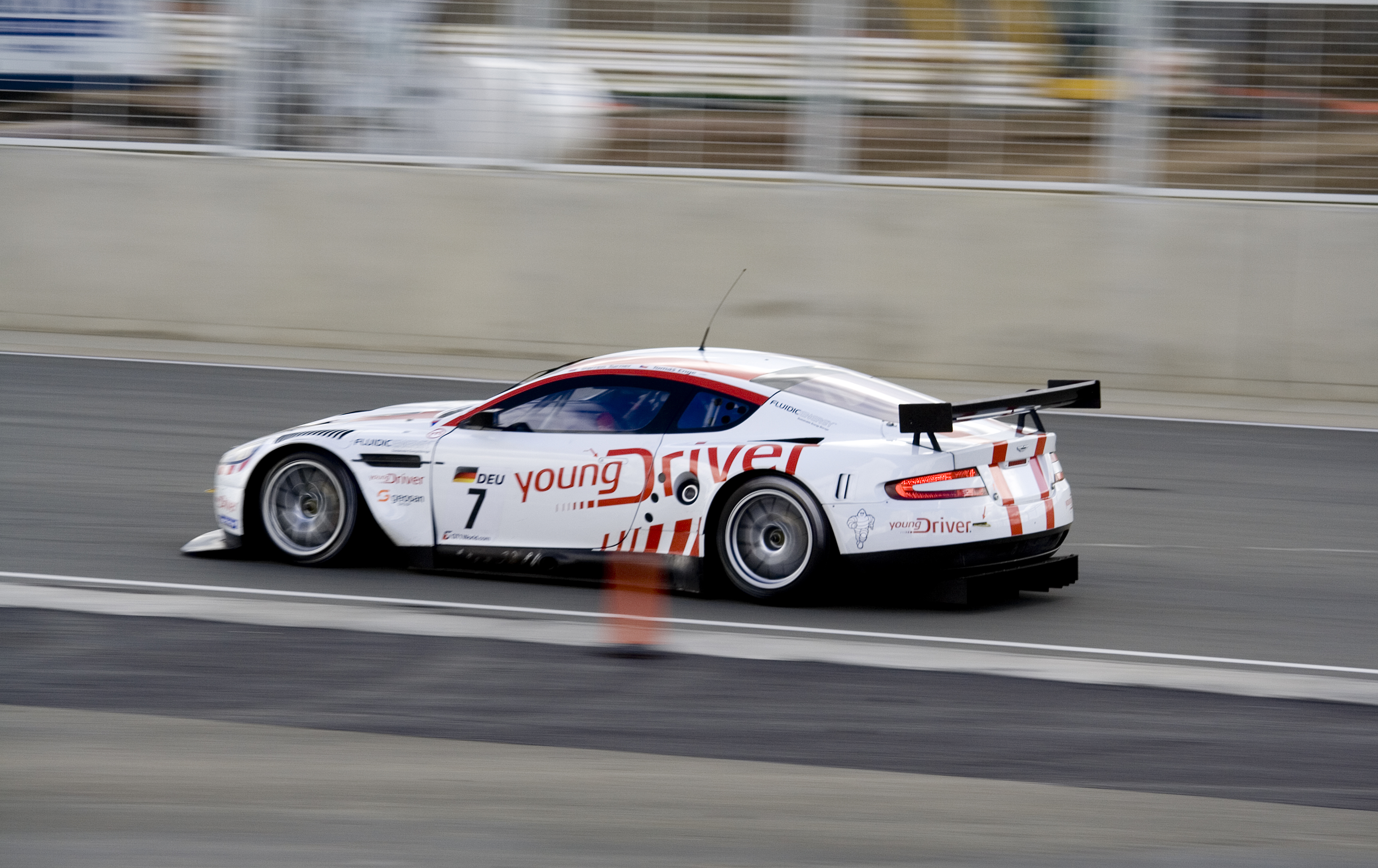
The No. 7 Young Driver AMR entry of Darren Turner and Tomáš Enge

Fischer Racing GmbH is an auto racing team founded by Erhard Fischer in 2006 and based in Paderborn, Germany. Initially created to compete in the German SEAT León Supercopa, the team expanded in 2009, purchasing Ford GTs to compete in the German ADAC GT Masters series as well as the FIA GT3 European Championship. During their 2009 European Championship campaign Fischer Racing's Florian Gruber and Christoffer Nygaard won the second race at Motorsport Arena Oschersleben.

At the end of the 2009 season Fischer Racing was named a partner with Aston Martin Racing, serving as one of two teams to campaign the Aston Martin DBR9 in the inaugural FIA GT1 World Championship in 2010. Fischer Racing will compete under the Young Driver AMR title in association with their partners Aston Martin Racing and the Young Driver program. Fischer will retain 2009 driver Nygaard while adding Aston Martin factory drivers Tomáš Enge, Darren Turner, and Stefan Mücke. Fischer have also been invited to participate in the 24 Hours of Le Mans, a first for the team. Fischer will also continue their participation in the FIA GT3 European Championship, remaining with their Ford GTs.

In 2013, Fischer Racing made an official partnership with Prodrive and Aston Martin Racing to run an Aston Martin V8 Vantage GTE in the FIA World Endurance Championship GTE-Am class. During the 2013 24 Hours of Le Mans, Danish driver Allan Simonsen crashed the Young Driver entry at Tetre Rouge and subsequently succumbed to his injuries.
