= 1990 German Formula Three Championship =

Seasons
- ← 1989 1991 →

The 1990 German Formula Three Championship (German: 1990 Deutsche Formel-3-Meisterschaft) was a multi-event motor racing championship for single-seat open wheel formula racing cars held in Germany, Belgium and Austria. The championship featured drivers competing in two-litre Formula Three racing cars which conform to the technical regulations, or formula, for the championship. It commenced on 31 March at Zolder and ended at Hockenheim on 13 October after eleven rounds.

West WTS Racing driver Michael Schumacher became a champion. He won five races and collected another two podium finishes to achieve the championship title. Otto Rensing finished as runner-up, winning at Hockenheimring and Norisring. Wolfgang Kaufmann was victorious at Zolder and Nürburgring, completing the top three in the drivers' championship. Peter Zakowski was the other race winner. Franz Binder clinched the B-Cup championship title.

== Teams and drivers ==
Entry List
Team	No.	Driver	Chassis	Engine	Rounds
Class A
(Germany) Opel Team Schübel West	2	(Germany) Wolfgang Kaufmann	Reynard 903/038	Opel	All
(Germany) Opel Team Schübel West	3	(Brazil) Eduar Neto	Reynard 903/028	Opel	1–7
(Germany) Opel Team Schübel West	3	(Germany) Markus Grossmann	Reynard 903/028	Opel	9
(Germany) Opel Team Schübel West	3	(Germany) Marc Hessel	Reynard 903/028	Opel	10–11
(Germany) West WTS Racing	4	(Germany) Thomas Rabe	Reynard 903/008	Volkswagen	All
(Germany) West WTS Racing	5	(Germany) Michael Schumacher	Reynard 903/007	Opel	All
(Germany) West WTS Racing	25	(United States) Markus Liesner	Reynard 903/001	Opel	11
(Germany) ONS Nachwuchsteam — Bongers Motorsport	7	(Germany) Jörg Müller	Reynard 903/002	Volkswagen	All
(Germany) Volkswagen Motorsport	8	(Germany) Ellen Lohr	Ralt RT34/818	Volkswagen	All
(Germany) Volkswagen Motorsport	9	(Germany) Otto Rensing	Ralt RT34/820	Volkswagen	All
(Germany) Josef Kaufmann Racing	10	(Germany) Meik Wagner	Martini MK60/02	Volkswagen	5–6, 9
(Germany) Beru Automobiltechnik – Pfeil Sportpromotion	11	(Germany) Franz Engstler	Martini MK60/02	Volkswagen	1–2
(Germany) Beru Automobiltechnik — Pfeil Sportpromotion	11	(Germany) Franz Engstler	Reynard 883/016	Volkswagen	3–4
(Germany) Beru Automobiltechnik — Pfeil Sportpromotion	12	(Germany) Franz Engstler	Eufra 390/02	Volkswagen	5–6, 8
(Germany) Beru Automobiltechnik — Pfeil Sportpromotion	12	(Germany) Mathias Arlt	Eufra 390/02	Volkswagen	10
(Germany) Aluett Zakowski F3 Team	13	(Germany) Peter Zakowski	Reynard 903/012	Mugen-Honda	All
(Germany) Eufra Racing	14	(Germany) Ralf Kelleners	Eufra 390/01	Volkswagen	All
(Germany) Eufra Racing	15	(Germany) Frank Schmickler	Eufra 390/02	Volkswagen	2–3
(Germany) Eufra Racing	15	(Japan) Sadafumi Nakajima	Eufra 390/02	Volkswagen	4
(Germany) Eufra Racing	15	(Austria) Mercedes Stermitz	Eufra 390/02	Volkswagen	7
(Germany) Eufra Racing	15	(Germany) Frank Beyerlein	Eufra 390/02	Volkswagen	11
(Germany) Marc Hessel	16	(Germany) Marc Hessel	Ralt RT34/837	Volkswagen	1–9
(Germany) Marc Hessel	16	(Germany) Markus Gutjahr	Ralt RT34/837	Volkswagen	10
(Germany) Mönninghoff Int. Sport Promotion	17	(Germany) Klaus Panchyrz	Reynard 903/014	Volkswagen	All
(Germany) Frank Beyerlein	19	(Germany) Frank Beyerlein	Martini MK60/03	Volkswagen	1–2, 5–8
(Switzerland) Jacques Isler Racing	20	(Switzerland) Jacques Isler	Dallara 390/007	Alfa Romeo	1–2, 5, 8
(Germany) G+M Motorsport	24	(Germany) Marco Werner	Ralt RT34/840	Opel	All
(Austria) Vienna Racing	26	(Germany) Frank Krämer	Eufra 390/03	Opel	2–11
(France) ASA Nevers – Serge Saulnier	27	(France) Frederic Gosparini	Dallara 390/020	Volkswagen	8–9
(Sweden) Fredrik Ekblom	28	(Sweden) Fredrik Ekblom	Reynard 903/049	Volkswagen	10
(United Kingdom) Marlboro Team West Surrey Racing	29	(Finland) Mika Häkkinen	Ralt RT34/817	Mugen-Honda	11
Class B
(Austria) Ski Zell Sport Team	50	(Austria) Franz Binder	Reynard 893/058	Volkswagen	All
(Switzerland) Formel Rennsport Club	51	(Switzerland) Rene Wartmann	Dallara 389/010	Volkswagen	1–6, 8–11
(Germany) Aluett Zakowski F3 Team	52	(Switzerland) Peter Schär	Reynard 893/078	Volkswagen	1–5
(Germany) Aluett Zakowski F3 Team	52	(Germany) Markus Grossmann	Reynard 893/078	Volkswagen	10–11
(Austria) MSC Aschau	53	(Austria) Josef Neuhauser	Reynard 893/055	Volkswagen	1–10
(Switzerland) Jacques Isler Racing	54	(Switzerland) Yolanda Surer	Dallara 388/015	Alfa Romeo	1, 6
(Germany) Mönninghoff Int. Sport Promotion	55	(Germany) Oliver Schmitt	Reynard 893/079	Volkswagen	All
(Germany) Bross Druck Chemie Racing	57	(Germany) Oliver Schäffer	Reynard 893/063	Volkswagen	1–6, 8–10
(Germany) Bross Druck Chemie Racing	57	(United Kingdom) Dave Coyne	Reynard 893/063	Volkswagen	7
(Germany) Bross Druck Chemie Racing	59	(Germany) Joachim Koscielniak	Reynard 893/121	Volkswagen	1, 3–8, 10
(Germany) Peter Katsarski	58	(Germany) Peter Katsarski	Reynard 893/120	Opel	10–11
(Germany) MSC Scuderia Mitwitz	60	(Germany) Justin Sünkel	Reynard 893/077	Volkswagen	7, 9–11
(Germany) Josef Kaufmann Racing	61	(Austria) Günter Muskovits	Martini MK55/03	Volkswagen	3
(Germany) Volkmar Löw	63	(Germany) Volkmar Löw	Ralt RT30/530	Volkswagen	4, 6
(Italy) Derichs Rennwagen	64	(Italy) Mario Novello	Derichs D385/02	Toyota	All
(Czechoslovakia) MSC "12" München	65	(Czechoslovakia) Jaroslav Vorel	KDV 4/01	Volkswagen	6–8
(Germany) Rex Autopflege	70	(Germany) Gernot Sirrenburg	Reynard 883/001	Volkswagen	4, 9–10
(Germany) Rex Autopflege	70	(Germany) Karl-Heinz Voss	Reynard 883/001	Volkswagen	6
(Germany) Rex Autopflege	72	(Switzerland) Franz Kaiser	Dallara 386/019	Volkswagen	11
(Denmark) Svend Hansen	71	(Denmark) Svend Hansen	Reynard 883/040	Volkswagen	1–2, 4–7, 10–11
(Germany) Rudi Seher	72	(Germany) Sigi Betz	Dallara 386/019	Volkswagen	2
(Germany) Rudi Seher	72	(Switzerland) Franz Kaiser	Dallara 386/019	Volkswagen	7
(Germany) Rudi Seher	72	(Germany) Karl-Heinz Voss	Dallara 386/019	Volkswagen	9, 11
(Austria) Schranz Racing Team	73	(Austria) Günter Aberer	Ralt RT30/563	Volkswagen	3
(Switzerland) Ecurie du Nord	73	(Switzerland) Philippe Brennenstuhl	Reynard 893/062	Alfa Romeo	9
(Austria) Walter Perfler	74	(Austria) Walter Perfler	Ralt RT31/701	Volkswagen	7
(Germany) Joachim Ryschka	77	(Germany) Joachim Ryschka	Ralt RT31/707	Volkswagen	1, 6–10
(Germany) Uwe Wolpert	78	(Germany) Uwe Wolpert	Reynard 893/096	Volkswagen	11
(Hungary) Külker SC	81	(Hungary) László Szász	Reynard 883/052	Volkswagen	7
(Germany) Johann Stelzer	84	(Germany) Johann Stelzer	Reynard 883/004	Volkswagen	7

== Calendar ==
Round	Location	Circuit	Date	Supporting
1	Heusden-Zolder, Belgium	Circuit Zolder	31 March	XXI. AvD "Bergischer Löwe"
2	Hockenheim, Germany	Hockenheimring	7 April	AvD/MAC Rennsport-Festival
3	Nürburg, Germany	Nürburgring	21 April	52. ADAC Eifelrennen
4	Berlin, Germany	AVUS	5 May	ADAC-Avus-Rennen
5	Wunstorf, Germany	Wunstorf	2 June	ADAC-Flugplatzrennen Wunstorf
6	Nuremberg, Germany	Norisring	30 June	200 Meilen von Nürnberg
7	Zeltweg, Austria	Österreichring	14 July	Preis des Österreichringes
8	Diepholz, Germany	Diepholz Airfield Circuit	4 August	23. ADAC-Flugplatzrennen Diepholz
9	Nürburg, Germany	Nürburgring	18 August	ADAC Sportwagen-Weltmeisterschaft
10	Nürburg, Germany	Nürburgring	1 September	ADAC Großer Preis der Tourenwagen
11	Hockenheim, Germany	Hockenheimring	13 October	ADAC-Preis Hockenheim

== Results ==
Round	Circuit	Pole position	Fastest lap	Winning driver	Winning team	B Class Winner
1	(Belgium) Circuit Zolder	(Germany) Michael Schumacher	(Germany) Klaus Panchyrz	(Germany) Wolfgang Kaufmann	(Germany) Opel Team Schübel West	(Austria) Franz Binder
2	(Germany) Hockenheimring	(Germany) Michael Schumacher	(Germany) Jörg Müller	(Germany) Otto Rensing	(Germany) Volkswagen Motorsport	(Switzerland) Rene Wartmann
3	(Germany) Nürburgring	(Germany) Wolfgang Kaufmann	(Germany) Wolfgang Kaufmann	(Germany) Wolfgang Kaufmann	(Germany) Opel Team Schübel West	(Austria) Franz Binder
4	(Germany) AVUS	(Germany) Otto Rensing	(Germany) Michael Schumacher	(Germany) Michael Schumacher	(Germany) West WTS Racing	(Denmark) Svend Hansen
5	(Germany) Wunstorf	(Germany) Michael Schumacher	(Germany) Meik Wagner	(Germany) Michael Schumacher	(Germany) West WTS Racing	(Switzerland) Rene Wartmann
6	(Germany) Norisring	(Germany) Otto Rensing	(Germany) Otto Rensing	(Germany) Otto Rensing	(Germany) Volkswagen Motorsport	(Austria) Franz Binder
7	(Austria) Österreichring	(Germany) Michael Schumacher	(Germany) Michael Schumacher	(Germany) Michael Schumacher	(Germany) West WTS Racing	(Austria) Franz Binder
8	(Germany) Diepholz Airfield Circuit	(Germany) Jörg Müller	(Germany) Michael Schumacher	(Germany) Michael Schumacher	(Germany) West WTS Racing	(Austria) Franz Binder
9	(Germany) Nürburgring	(Germany) Michael Schumacher	(Germany) Michael Schumacher	(Germany) Michael Schumacher	(Germany) West WTS Racing	(Austria) Franz Binder
10	(Germany) Nürburgring	(Germany) Michael Schumacher	(Germany) Frank Krämer	(Germany) Peter Zakowski	(Germany) Aluett Zakowski F3 Team	(Austria) Franz Binder
11	(Germany) Hockenheimring	(Finland) Mika Häkkinen	(Finland) Mika Häkkinen	(Finland) Mika Häkkinen	(United Kingdom) Marlboro Team West Surrey Racing	(Austria) Franz Binder

== Championship standings ==
=== A-Class ===
- Points are awarded as follows:

1	2	3	4	5	6	7	8	9	10
20	15	12	10	8	6	4	3	2	1

Pos	Driver	ZOL (Belgium)	HOC1 (Germany)	NÜR1 (Germany)	AVU (Germany)	WUN (Germany)	NOR (Germany)	ZEL (Austria)	DIE (Germany)	NÜR2 (Germany)	NÜR3 (Germany)	HOC2 (Germany)	Points
1	(Germany) Michael Schumacher	**Ret**	**19**	5	1	**1**	2	**1**	1	**1**	**4**	2	148
2	(Germany) Otto Rensing	9	1	2	**Ret**	2	**1**	6	3	2	DSQ	3	117
3	(Germany) Wolfgang Kaufmann	1	4	**1**	15	Ret	5	4	11	10	3	Ret	81
4	(Germany) Klaus Panchyrz	2	3	Ret	2	8	3	Ret	Ret	6	6	7	73
5	(Germany) Jörg Müller	Ret	2	8	5	5	6	12	**2**	12	9	5	65
6	(Germany) Peter Zakowski	12	8	7	Ret	Ret	10	10	4	3	1	4	61
7	(Germany) Ralf Kelleners	DNS	Ret	Ret	6	3	9	3	Ret	5	7	6	50
8	(Germany) Marco Werner	DSQ	Ret	6	Ret	4	7	2	5	7	Ret	Ret	47
9	(Germany) Ellen Lohr	11	15	3	3	Ret	4	Ret	15	9	8	9	41
10	(Germany) Frank Krämer		20	DNS	10	6	8	7	10	4	2	Ret	40
11	(Germany) Marc Hessel	Ret	5	9	4	Ret	11	9	6	8	Ret	8	34
12	(Austria) Franz Binder	3	11	10	16	DNS	13	13	7	11	5	10	26
13	(Brazil) Eduar Neto	Ret	Ret	4	7	10	Ret	5					23
14	(Finland) Mika Häkkinen											**1**	20
15	(Germany) Thomas Rabe	4	7	13	8	Ret	12	8	Ret	21	Ret	12	20
16	(Switzerland) Rene Wartmann	5	10	Ret	Ret	9	14		8	14	16	13	14
17	(Germany) Franz Engstler	6	9	14	Ret	Ret	Ret		Ret				8
18	(Switzerland) Jacques Isler	Ret	6			Ret			DNS				6
19	(Denmark) Svend Hansen	7	21		9	12	Ret	13			11	11	6
20	(Austria) Josef Neuhauser	8	17	15	DNS	Ret	DNQ	14	9	17	Ret		5
21	(Germany) Meik Wagner					7	15			19			4
22	(Switzerland) Yolanda Surer	10					17						1
23	(Sweden) Fredrik Ekblom										10		1
	(Germany) Oliver Schmitt	Ret	13	11	11	11	16	Ret	16	16	12	14	0
	(Germany) Frank Beyerlein	DNS	Ret			Ret	19	11	12			Ret	0
	(Germany) Oliver Schäffer	13	12	16	12	Ret	Ret			18	15		0
	(Switzerland) Peter Schär	Ret	18	12	18	DNS							0
	(Germany) Joachim Koscielniak	Ret		DNS	DNS	Ret	18	Ret	DNS		13		0
	(France) Frédéric Gosparini								13	15			0
	(Japan) Sadafumi Nakajima				13								0
	(Germany) Joachim Ryschka	Ret					DNQ	15	14	Ret	Ret		0
	(Germany) Gernot Sirrenburg				14					25	19		0
	(Germany) Markus Grossmann									Ret	14	Ret	0
	(Germany) Frank Schmickler		14	Ret									0
	(United States) Markus Liesner											15	0
	(Germany) Justin Sünkel							19		22	17	16	0
	(Austria) Mercedes Stermitz							16					0
	(Germany) Sigi Betz		16										0
	(Switzerland) Franz Kaiser							17				17	0
	(Germany) Volkmar Löw				17		DNQ						0
	(Germany) Johann Stelzer							18					0
	(Germany) Mathias Arlt										18		0
	(Germany) Uwe Wolpert											18	0
	(Italy) Mario Novello				19		DNQ		Ret				0
	(Switzerland) Philippe Brennenstuhl									20			0
	(Germany) Karl-Heinz Voss						DNQ			23		Ret	0
	(Germany) Peter Katsarski									24	Ret		0
	(Germany) Markus Gutjahr										Ret		0
	(United Kingdom) Dave Coyne							Ret					0
	(Austria) Günter Aberer			Ret									0
	(Czechoslovakia) Jaroslav Vorel						DNQ	DNS	DNS				0
	(Austria) Günter Muskovits			DNS									0
	(Austria) Walter Perfler							DNS					0
	(Hungary) László Szász							DNS					0
Pos	Driver	ZOL (Belgium)	HOC1 (Germany)	NÜR1 (Germany)	AVU (Germany)	WUN (Germany)	NOR (Germany)	ZEL (Austria)	DIE (Germany)	NÜR2 (Germany)	NÜR3 (Germany)	HOC2 (Germany)	Points

Colour	Result
Gold	Winner
Silver	Second place
Bronze	Third place
Green	Points classification
Blue	Non-points classification
Blue	Non-classified finish (NC)
Purple	Retired, not classified (Ret)
Red	Did not qualify (DNQ)
Red	Did not pre-qualify (DNPQ)
Black	Disqualified (DSQ)
White	Did not start (DNS)
White	Withdrew (WD)
White	Race cancelled (C)
Blank	Did not practice (DNP)
Blank	Did not arrive (DNA)
Blank	Excluded (EX)

**Bold** – Pole
Italics – Fastest Lap
