= Tom Kristensen =

Danish racing driver (born 1967)

Tom Kristensen "Mr. Le Mans"
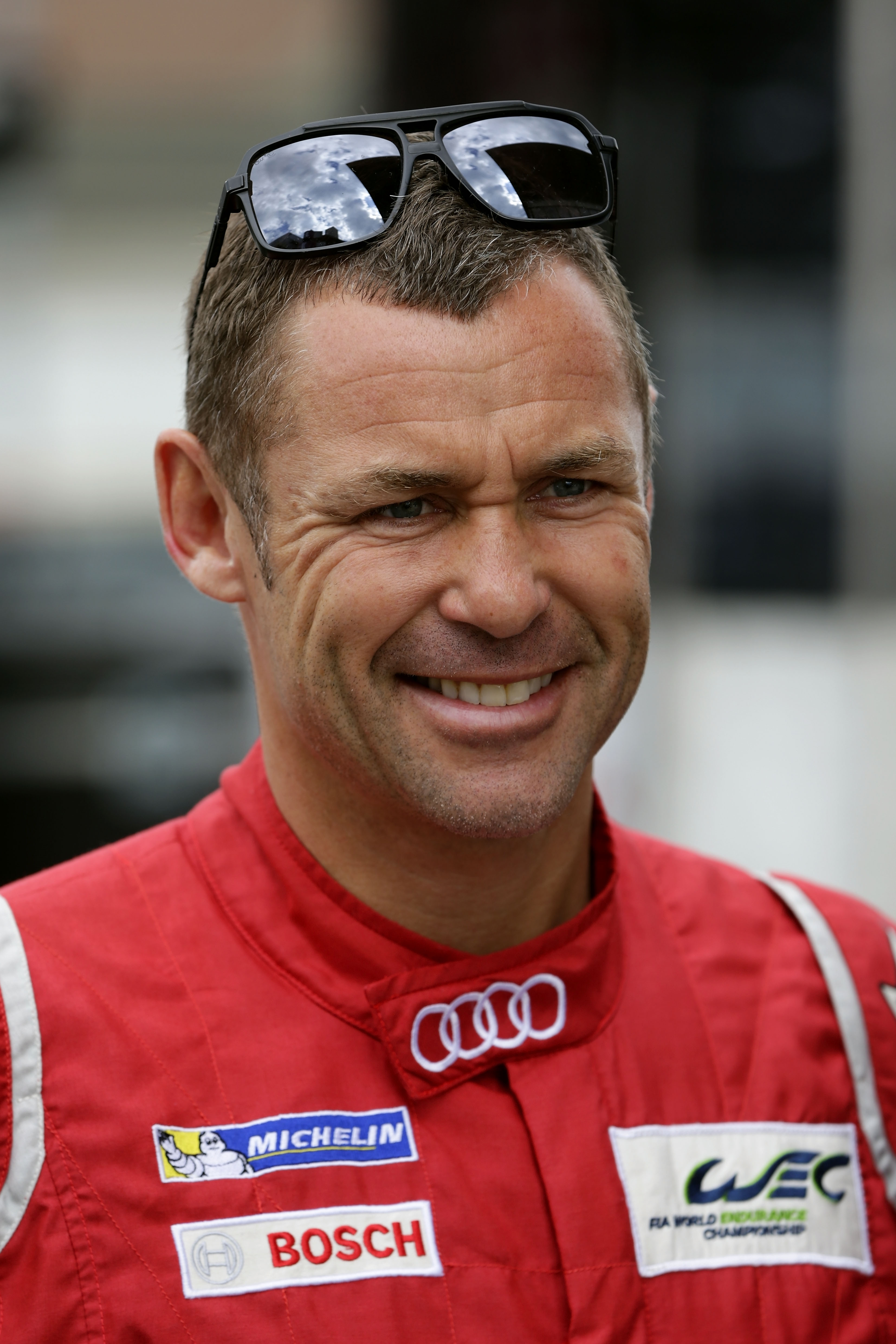
- Kristensen in 2014
- Nationality: (Denmark) Danish
- Born: 7 July 1967 (age 59) Hobro, Denmark

FIA World Endurance Championship
- Categorisation: FIA Platinum
- Years active: 2012–2014
- Former teams: Audi Sport Team Joest
- Starts: 24
- Championships: 1 (2013)
- Wins: 6
- Podiums: 19
- Poles: 4

24 Hours of Le Mans career
- Years: 1997–2014
- Teams: Audi Sport Team Joest; Audi Sport North America; ADT Champion Racing; Audi Sport Japan Team Goh; Team Bentley; Team BMW Motorsport; Joest Racing
- Best finish: 1st (1997, 2000, 2001, 2002, 2003, 2004, 2005, 2008, 2013)
- Class wins: 9 (1997, 2000, 2001, 2002, 2003, 2004, 2005, 2008, 2013)

DTM
- Years active: 2004–2009, 2011
- Former teams: Abt Sportsline
- Starts: 61
- Wins: 4
- Podiums: 18
- Poles: 7
- Fastest laps: 4
- Best finish: 3rd in 2005, 2006

Previous series
- 2004–2011 2001–2002 2000 1998–1999 1996–1997 1994–1995 1994–1995 1992–1993 1989, 1991: American Le Mans Series; BTCC; German Supertouring; International Formula 3000; Japanese Formula 3000; JTCC; Japanese Formula Three; German Formula Three

Championship titles
- 2013 2001 1993 1991: FIA World Endurance Championship; American Le Mans Series; Japanese Formula Three; German Formula Three

Tom Kristensen (born 7 July 1967) is a Danish former racing driver. He holds the record for the most wins at the 24 Hours of Le Mans with nine, six of which were consecutive (from 2000 to 2005). In 1997, he won the race with the Joest Racing team, driving a Tom Walkinshaw Racing-designed Porsche WSC-95, after being a late inclusion in the team following Davy Jones' accident that eventually ruled him out of the race. All of his subsequent wins came driving an Audi prototype, except in 2003, when he drove a Bentley prototype. In both 1999 and 2007 Kristensen's teammates crashed out of comfortable leads in the closing hours of the race. He is considered by many to be the greatest driver ever to have raced in the 24 Hours of Le Mans.

Elsewhere, Kristensen holds the record for most wins at the 12 Hours of Sebring with a total of six. In August 2014, Kristensen was appointed Knight of the Order of the Dannebrog by the Queen of Denmark. In January 2018, he was inducted into the Danish Sports Hall of Fame.

== Early career ==
=== Beginnings in Europe (1984–91) ===
Kristensen was born in Hobro. His career began in 1984, whereafter he won several karting titles, including the 1985 Nordic Formula A series where he beat Mika Häkkinen. After entering his first open-wheel races in Formula Ford during 1987, Kristensen made his German Formula Three debut at Brno in 1989, entering three events. Aside from that however, Kristensen did not race until 1991, completing training to become a bank clerk. In 1991, he was given the chance to race in German F3 on a full-time basis by Bertram Schäfer and won the opening race at Zolder from pole. From there, seven further podiums, including two more wins at the Nürburgring and Hockenheimring, allowed Kristensen to win the championship in controlling fashion.

=== Move to Japan (1992–95) ===
Subsequently, Kristensen relocated his racing career to Japan, where he drove concurrently in Japanese Formula 3 and the Japanese Touring Car Championship; he would score his maiden win in the latter at Suzuka and finished second in the teams' standings. He also made his Japanese Formula 3000 debut during 1992. The following year, Kristensen drove in Japanese F3 and the JTCC again, taking a dominant title in the former driving for the TOM'S outfit.

In 1994, driving for Toyota Team Cerumo, Kristensen won at Sugo, twice at Suzuka, and twice at Aida to place second in the JTCC once again. He lost out on the title to Masanori Sekiya by a single point. Additionally, Kristensen finished ninth in his first full-time season of Japanese Formula 3000, driving for Navi Connection Racing. For his final year in Japan, 1995, Kristensen contested both championships with team Cerumo: he won thrice in the JTCC and finished fifth in the championship, whilst claiming his maiden victory in Japanese F3000 at the Mine Circuit to finish the season third.

=== International F3000 (1996–97) ===
Kristensen returned to Europe in 1996, entering the International F3000 Championship with Shannon Racing. However, following just two rounds which included a pole at the Pau Grand Prix, which ended in a mid-race accident, Kristensen left the team. He contested five of the remaining eight rounds with Edenbridge Racing, finishing second at Silverstone and scoring third at Spa-Francorchamps after another pole position; this left him seventh in the standings. For the 1997 season, Kristensen switched to Auto Sport Racing. At the opening round in Silverstone, Kristensen finished second, but inherited the win after a disqualification for Ricardo Zonta. He finished second at the next event in Pau, but retired from an attrition-filled race in Helsinki. Following a podium at the Nürburgring, Kristensen only scored one more point throughout the season and dropped to sixth in the standings.

== Professional career ==
=== Touring car racing (1998–2000) ===
Following his debut Le Mans success, Kristensen entered the 1998 Super Tourenwagen Cup as part of JAS Team Honda Sport. He was outscored by teammate Gabriele Tarquini and only scored a sole podium, third at Wunstorf, on his way to 11th overall. He also became a test driver for Tyrrell in their final Formula One season that year, testing at Magny-Cours in view of a potential race seat — he was around half a second slower than regular driver Ricardo Rosset, albeit whilst using an older engine. In 1999, Kristensen returned to the Super Tourenwagen Cup and improved his results, winning two races at the Nürburgring and one at Hockenheim to finish third in the standings, narrowly ahead of teammate Tarquini.

Kristensen's touring car exploits continued in 2000, when Kristensen entered the British Touring Car Championship with the Honda factory team. His maiden win came at Oulton Park in the middle of the campaign, before Kristensen capped off the year by winning both races at the Silverstone season finale, thus placing seventh overall. He was also a Michelin test driver in 2000 as they prepared their F1 tyres using an older Williams car as well as a year-old Stewart car on European circuits.

=== Focus on endurance racing (1999–2003) ===
Parallel to his touring car career, Kristensen entered multiple endurance events in 1999 and 2000. This included the 12 Hours of Sebring, which he won in 1999 whilst piloting a BMW V12 LMR alongside Jörg Müller and JJ Lehto, and in 2000, where his Audi R8 shared with Emanuele Pirro and Frank Biela led a 1-2 for Audi. The latter trio also raced at Petit Le Mans, finishing second despite damaging the car's diffuser in a collision. In 2001, Kristensen and Audi competed in the American Le Mans Series and finished fourth in the drivers' standings during a dominant season for Audi, which locked out the top four positions in the table. During the campaign, Kristensen claimed two pole positions and won four races alongside Rinaldo Capello, but missed out on the title following a crash at the season finale caused by a delaminated tyre.

Kristensen returned to the ALMS in 2002, driving the No. 2 car for Audi Sport North America together with Capello. The pair almost won at Mid-Ohio thanks to a fuel-saving strategy, but Kristensen, having driven without pitting for over one-and-a-half hours, ran out of fuel coming towards the finish line and coasted home in second. Their first win of the season came at Road America, where Kristensen battled for the lead with Pirro during the race's first half and penalties for Capello were later negated by a puncture for the leading Audi of Biela. Another victory followed at Trois-Rivières, as a late pit stop for fresh tyres allowed Capello to take first place from Biela. A heavy crash from Pirro whilst fighting with Kristensen allowed the Dane to coast to a commanding win at Mosport, before he clinched the ALMS title with a win at the season-ending Petit Le Mans.

A truncated 2003 campaign followed, in which Kristensen claimed a commanding victory in the rain at Spa and triumphed at the 1000 km of Le Mans held on the Bugatti Circuit, both alongside Seiji Ara. Kristensen also continued his Le Mans success story that year, claiming pole and winning for Team Bentley with Capello and Guy Smith.

=== DTM commitments alongside endurance successes (2004–06) ===
In 2004, Kristensen joined Abt Sportsline in the Deutsche Tourenwagen Masters. At the seventh round in Oschersleben, Kristensen beat fellow Audi driver Martin Tomczyk to claim his maiden DTM win. He scored another podium in Brno to finish fourth in the standings. Having won the 12 Hours of Sebring alongside Lehto and Marco Werner at the start of 2005, Kristensen returned to the DTM. A strong opening season, where Kristensen claimed podiums at the Lausitzring, Spa, and Brno — which saw him complete an Audi 1-2 behind Mattias Ekström — helped the Dane to ascend towards the front of the standings. Kristensen scored a pair of pole positions at Oschersleben and the Norisring thereafter, before finishing second at the Nürburgring. Though he fell out of the title hunt due to a lack of wins, Kristensen, who made his final rostrum appearance at the second Lausitzring round, finished third in the championship.

At the start of 2006, Kristensen repeated his victory at Sebring together with Capello and Allan McNish in the new Audi R10 TDI, making it the first win for a diesel-powered car in a major sports car race. The momentum from this win carried forward into his third DTM season, as two runner-up finishes at Hockenheim and the Lausitzring preceded a victory from pole at Oschersleben, which put Kristensen into the lead of the championship. The following race at Brands Hatch looked to yield another run from pole position to the top step, before the leading Kristensen encountered a suspension failure that threw him out of the race. After two fifth places in the next two events, Kristensen won at Zandvoort thanks to a strong start and in spite of a fuel can problem at his pit stop, thus cutting down his gap to points leader Bernd Schneider to ten points. However, a non-score at the next race in Barcelona proved to be a setback, and despite two third places in the final two rounds Kristensen dropped to third in the standings, in what turned out to be his most successful DTM season.

=== Hockenheim accident & final DTM seasons (2007–09) ===
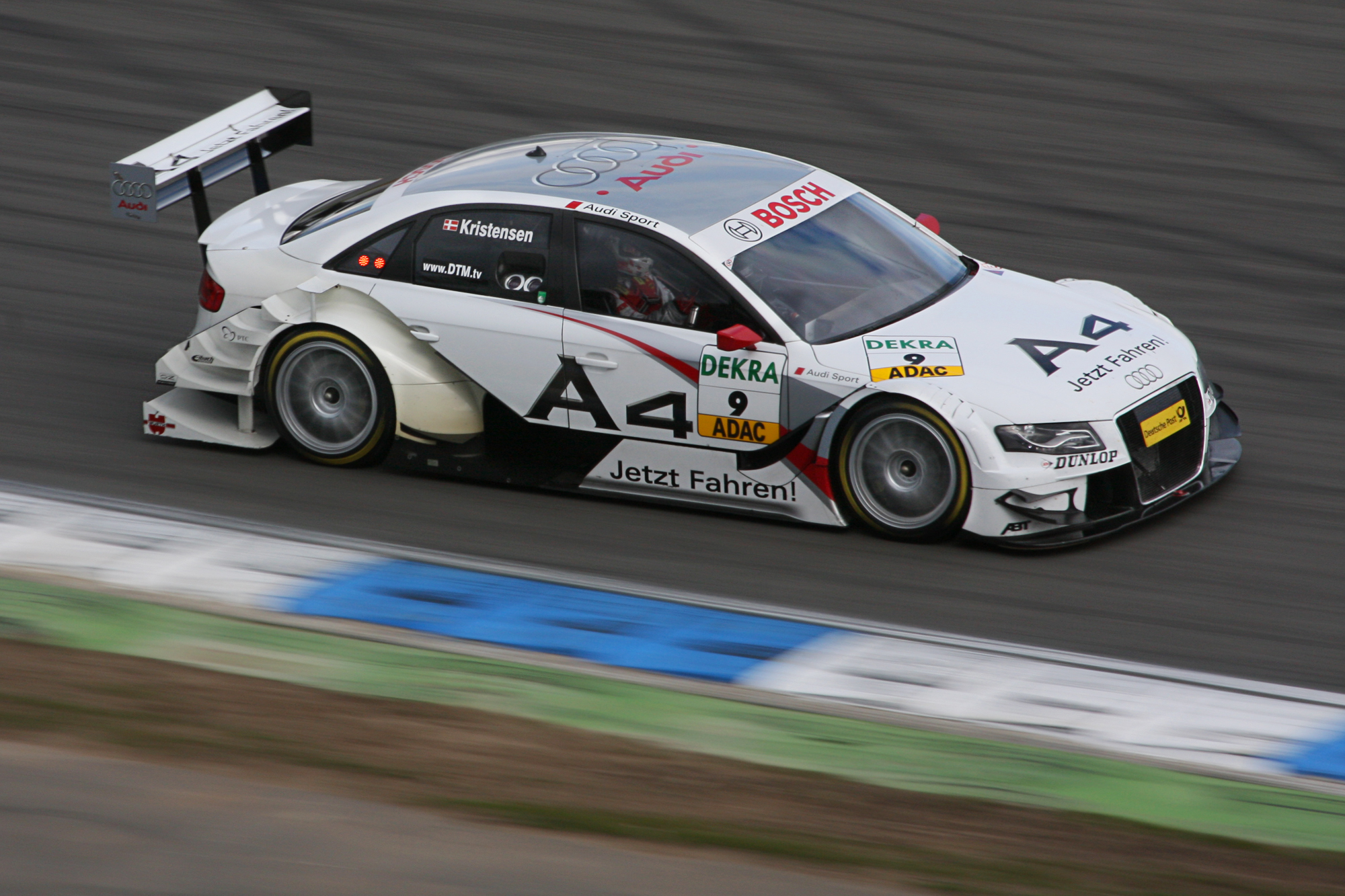
Kristensen driving for Audi (Abt) at the Hockenheimring in the 2008 Deutsche Tourenwagen Masters season.

2007 proved to be a fruitless year for Kristensen, who started it by finishing fourth at the 12 Hours of Sebring due to two early starter motor failures. Kristensen entered the DTM once again in 2007, but suffered a heavy accident at the season opener in Hockenheim after a collision with Alexandre Prémat. The crash resulted in a long break from training for Kristensen, who missed three rounds of the season as a result. It was reported that a new type of collar worn by Kristensen may have prevented him suffering a broken neck in the crash. Once he returned, the Dane achieved a best finish of fifth at the Norisring and claimed a sole pole position at the final Hockenheim round; this resulted in 14th place in the standings by year's end.

Kristensen began 2008 by finishing third at Sebring, being beaten by two Porsche Spyder LMP2 entries. His season in the DTM brought home three podiums and two poles, which helped him to eighth in the standings. A slightly more successful season followed in 2009: Kristensen, along with Capello and McNish, won at Sebring in the Audi R15 TDI. In what he announced to be his final campaign in the DTM, Kristensen finished eighth overall again, having inherited a victory at the season opener in Hockenheim after a puncture for leader Ekström. After the season ended, Kristensen revealed it had taken two years until all after-effects of his 2007 accident had disappeared.

=== Endurance-only schedules, WEC era, retirement (2010–14) ===
With his focus on endurance racing from 2010, Kristensen and Audi entered two rounds of the Le Mans Series that year, finishing third at Spa after losing second place late on to Stéphane Sarrazin. In a chaotic Le Mans that included early contact caused by the BMW of Andy Priaulx, Kristensen, Capello, and McNish finished third in an Audi 1-2-3. In 2011, Kristensen drove in all seven races of the Intercontinental Le Mans Cup, which included another third place at Spa, an early retirement at Le Mans due to a dramatic accident by McNish, and further non-finishes at Petit Le Mans and Zhuhai.

Going into 2012, Kristensen entered the newly-formed FIA World Endurance Championship with Audi's R18. He, along with McNish and Capello, won the first race of the series at Sebring, a victory that made Kristensen the most winning driver in the history of the event. A technical problem during the first hour of the race at Spa conspired to drop Kristensen's car to second, before he once again showed his class at Le Mans, taking the lead with six hours to go after a mistake by Marcel Fässler in the sister car. However, a collision suffered by McNish dropped the #2 entry behind the sister car by the checkered flag. Kristensen and his teammates scored podiums in each of the subsequent five races but lost out on the championship to the #1 entry at the final round.

In 2013, Kristensen returned to the WEC, partnering McNish and Loïc Duval. They won the season opener at Silverstone, with Kristensen dedicating the victory to his father, who had died before the 12 Hours of Sebring, which Kristensen had finished second. After second at Spa, Kristensen and his teammates clinched victory at Le Mans — Kristensen's ninth and final — in a drive that was overshadowed by the death of Allan Simonsen on the opening lap of the race, whom Kristensen would dedicate this win to. Second in Brazil came before victory number three at the Circuit of the Americas, where Kristensen took the lead from Sarrazin during the second hour. With two more podiums, Kristensen, McNish, and Duval clinched the title with a race to spare by finishing third in Shanghai.

For the 2014 WEC season, Kristensen and Duval would be joined by Lucas di Grassi. The year yielded fewer results, with second places at Spa, Le Mans, and Austin being the campaign's highlights. On 19 November 2014, Kristensen announced at a press conference in Copenhagen that he was retiring from motorsport at the end of the 2014 season. At the season finale in São Paulo, Kristensen capped off his career with a podium finish.

== 24 Hours of Le Mans ==
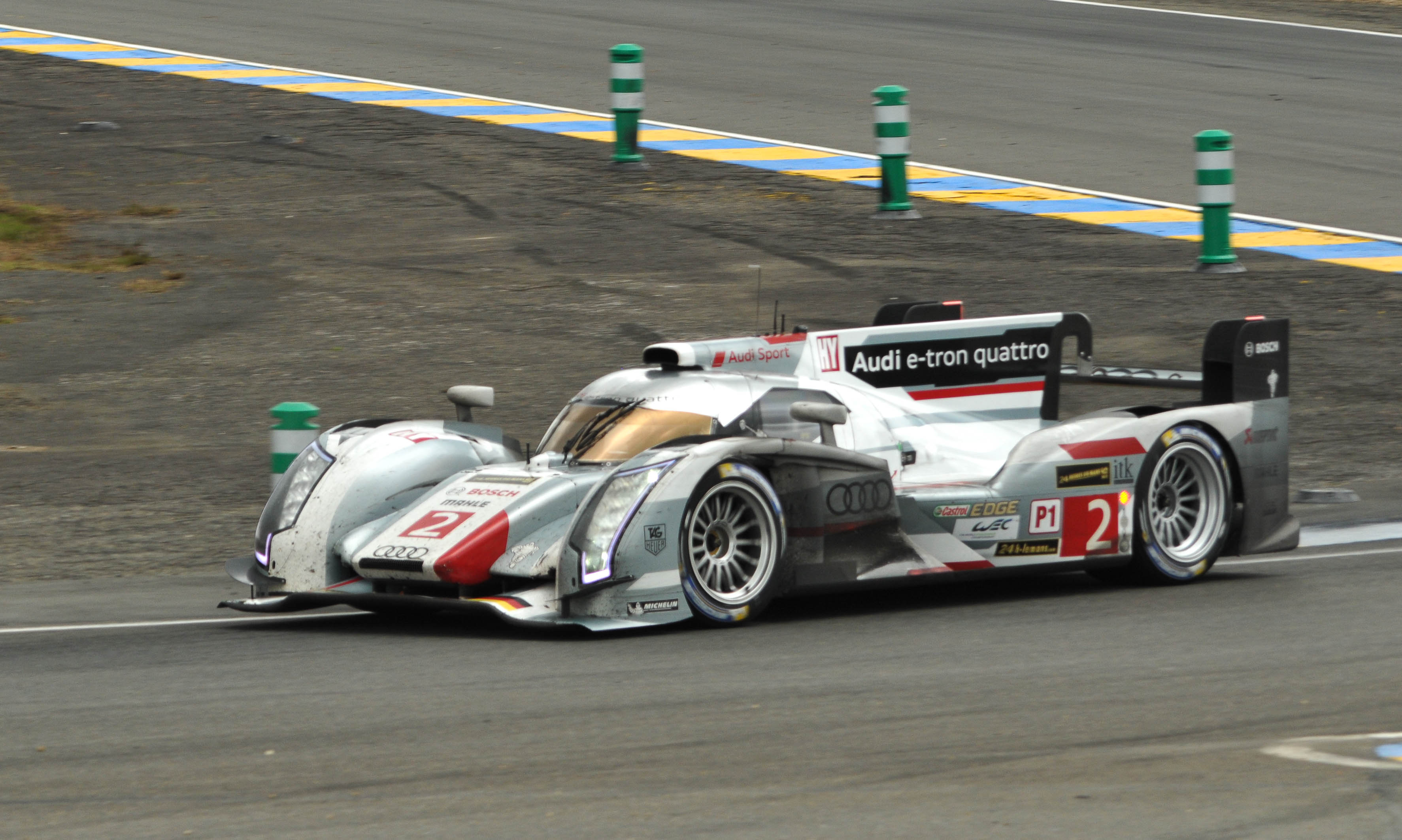
Kristensen took his 9th 24 Hours of Le Mans victory in an Audi R18 e-tron quattro in 2013.

=== Maiden victory, BMW years (1997–99) ===
Kristensen's career at Circuit de la Sarthe began in the 1997 event, when he was called by Porsche customer team Joest Racing two days before the race as a late substitute for an injured Davy Jones. Partnering the experienced duo of Michele Alboreto and Stefan Johansson in a Porsche WSC-95 after completing just 20 laps in practice, Kristensen made his mark with a sequence of fastest laps during the night, with an intended triple stint turning into a quadruple stint. He also set the lap record later on. Thanks to a late fire for the leading, factory-entered Porsche 911 GT1 Kristensen and his teammates won the race, one lap ahead of the second-placed car. Kristensen drove for BMW the two following years, but retired early in 1998 and experienced drama in 1999: the team led going into the final hours before a heavy crash for teammate JJ Lehto caused by a stuck throttle put them out of the event.

=== Audi domination (2000–08) ===
Having returned to the Joest team, this time in a factory effort with Audi, Kristensen dominated the 2000 event in the Audi R8 alongside Emanuele Pirro and Frank Biela. In 2001, though treacherous rain plagued the event, the trio won in commanding fashion once again. The trio profited from a new Fuel Stratified Injection system, which allowed them to save fuel more easily and restart the car faster after each pit stop. Kristensen, Pirro, and Biela dominated in 2002 and, with their third successive victory, became the first drivers who shared victory in three consecutive years.

Going into the 2003 iteration, Kristensen joined the Bentley works effort to pilot its Speed 8 prototype along with Rinaldo Capello and Guy Smith. The Dane took pole and, with the team having lost the lead during the opening stint, retook the lead by passing JJ Lehto on his first full race lap. He and Smith drove out an authoritative lead during the race's halfway point and, together with Capello, finished two laps ahead of the second-placed sister car. Kristensen returned to drive the Audi R8 in 2004, this time partnering Capello and Seiji Ara at Team Goh. They took the lead during the early morning thanks to repairs for the leading UK-Audi and, despite a delaminating tyre caused by a lock-up from Capello and a fuel spill that ignited into a short fire in the pit lane, Kristensen and his teammates clung on to victory. In winning, Kristensen equalled Jacky Ickx's record of six Le Mans victories. He broke the record in 2005, cruising to victory with a two-lap advantage in a Champion Racing-fielded R8 together with Lehto and Marco Werner. This gave Kristensen his seventh victory at Le Mans, as well as a record-breaking sixth successive win.

The 2006 race saw Kristensen finishing in third place in the new diesel-powered Audi R10, as a change of the car's fuel injectors in the first hours and subsequent problems dropped him, Allan McNish, and Capello out of contention early. For the 2007 race, Kristensen's participation looked to be in jeopardy following his Hockenheim accident, but he was eventually cleared to race. His Audi crew took the lead during the night and remained there until hour 17, when the car lost its left rear wheel and crashed out, with Capello driving. Returning in 2008, Kristensen played a huge part in beating Peugeot by gaining up to seven seconds on Jacques Villeneuve during rainy stints in the night, before taking the lead on strategy in the morning. He, Capello, and McNish took the win.

=== Final years (2009–14) ===
In 2009, the trio finished third, losing six laps to the winning Peugeot entry after pitting with three hours to go to fix an engine issue. Another third in 2010 following a crash from Kristensen caused by a GT car preceded an early retirement in 2011, when teammate McNish suffered a harrowing accident from which he emerged unscathed. Another collision from McNish, this time whilst leading in the final few hours, led to a second place finish in 2012. Kristensen, for the ninth and final time, returned to the top step of the rostrum in 2013, triumphing alongside McNish and Loïc Duval. The final Le Mans appearance for Kristensen came in 2014. This race included a run in the lead on Sunday but also a loss of lead due to a turbocharger replacement; Kristensen, Duval, and Lucas di Grassi finished second behind the No. 2 Audi.

== Racing record ==
=== Complete German Formula Three results ===
(key) (Races in bold indicate pole position) (Races in italics indicate fastest lap)

Year	Entrant	Engine	Class	1	2	3	4	5	6	7	8	9	10	11	12	DC	Pts
1989	Vienna Racing Team	VW	B	HOC	NÜR	AVU	BRN; 15	ZEL; 15	HOC; DNS	WUN	HOC	DIE	NÜR	NÜR	HOC	31st	8
1991	Volkswagen Motorsport	VW	A	**ZOL**; 1	HOC; 2	**NÜR**; 2	**AVU**; 16	**MST**; 2	WUN; 5	NOR; 18	DIE; 2	**NÜR**; 1	NÜR; 5	**HOC**; 1		1st	136

=== Complete Japanese Formula Three results ===
(key) (Races in bold indicate pole position) (Races in italics indicate fastest lap)

Year	Team	Engine	1	2	3	4	5	6	7	8	9	10	DC	Pts
1992	Navi Connection Racing	Toyota	SUZ; Ret	TSU; DSQ	FUJ; DSQ	SUZ; 2	SEN; 3	TAI; DSQ	MIN; 3	SUG; 3	SUZ; 3	SUZ; 5	5th	24
1993	TOM'S	Toyota	**SUZ**; 1	**TSU**; 1	**FUJ**; 1	SUZ; 2	SEN; 4	TAI; 4	**MIN**; 1	SUG; 1	SUZ; 2	SUZ	**1st**	**57**

=== Complete Japanese Touring Car Championship results ===
Year	Team	Car	Class	1	2	3	4	5	6	7	8	9	10	11	12	13	14	15	16	17	18	DC	Pts
1992	Object T	Nissan Skyline GT-R	JTC-1	AID; 2	AUT; 2	SUG; 4	SUZ; 1	MIN; 2	TSU; 5	SEN; 5	FUJ; 3											**3rd**	**103**
1993	Object T	Nissan Skyline GT-R	JTC-1	MIN; 3	AUT; 2	SUG; Ret	SUZ; 4	AID; 3	TSU; 3	TOK; 7	SEN; 5	FUJ; 1										5th	95
1994	Toyota Team Cerumo	Toyota Corona		**AUT**; **1**; 5	AUT; 2; 6	**SUG**; **1**; 1	**SUG**; **2**; 12	TOK; 1; 4	TOK; 2; 7	SUZ; 1; 1	**SUZ**; **2**; 1	**MIN**; **1**; 2	MIN; 2 DNS	**AID**; **1**; 1	**AID**; **2**; 1	TSU; 1 NC	TSU; 2; 5	**SEN**; **1**; 2	SEN; 2; 5	FUJ; 1; 24	FUJ; 2; 6	**2nd**	**134**
1995	Toyota Team Cerumo	Toyota Corona EXiV		FUJ; 1; 1	**FUJ**; **2**; 1	SUG; 1; 5	SUG; 2 Ret	**TOK**; **1**; 1	**TOK**; **2**; 12	SUZ; 1 Ret	SUZ; 2; 8	MIN; 1; 3	MIN; 2; 4	**AID**; **1** Ret	AID; 2 DSQ	SEN; 1; 18	SEN; 2; 16	FUJ; 1 Ret	FUJ; 2; 4			5th	82

=== Complete Japanese Formula 3000/Formula Nippon results ===
(key) (Races in bold indicate pole position) (Races in italics indicate fastest lap)

Year	Entrant	1	2	3	4	5	6	7	8	9	10	11	DC	Points
1992	Navi Connection Racing	SUZ	FUJ	MIN	SUZ	AUT; 14	SUG; Ret	FUJ; Ret	FUJ	SUZ	FUJ	SUZ	NC	0
1994	Navi Connection Racing	SUZ; 8	FUJ; 9	MIN; 9	SUZ; 6	SUG; 11	FUJ; 9	SUZ; 6	FUJ; Ret	FUJ; 12	SUZ; 4		9th	5
1995	Team Cerumo	SUZ; 4	FUJ; C	**MIN**; 1	SUZ; 2	SUG; Ret	FUJ; 4	TOK; 3	FUJ; Ret	SUZ; 5			3rd	29
1996	Navi Connection Racing	SUZ	MIN	FUJ	TOK	SUZ	SUG	FUJ	MIN; 8	SUZ	FUJ		NC	0

=== Complete All-Japan GT Championship results ===
(key) (Races in bold indicate pole position) (Races in italics indicate fastest lap)

Year	Team	Car	Class	1	2	3	4	5	6	DC	Pts
1994	Blitz Racing	Toyota Supra	GT1	FUJ	SEN	FUJ	SUG	MIN; 11		NC	0
1996	FET Racing	Toyota Supra	GT500	SUZ; 10	FUJ; 13	SEN; 6	FUJ; 4	SUG; 14	MIN; 7	12th	21
1997	Power Craft	Toyota Supra	GT500	SUZ	FUJ	SEN	FUJ; 15	MIN; 4	SUG	17th	10

=== Complete International Formula 3000 results ===
(key) (Races in bold indicate pole position) (Races in italics indicate fastest lap)

Year	Entrant	1	2	3	4	5	6	7	8	9	10	DC	Points
1996	Shannon Racing	NÜR; 4	**PAU**; Ret									7th	18
1996	Edenbridge Racing			PER	HOC; 5	SIL; 2	**SPA**; 3	MAG	EST	MUG; 4	HOC; Ret	7th	18
1997	Auto Sport Racing	SIL; 1	PAU; 2	HEL; Ret	NÜR; 3	PER; Ret	**HOC**; Ret	A1R; 6	**SPA**; Ret	MUG; EX	JER; Ret	6th	19

=== Complete 24 Hours of Le Mans results ===
24 Hours of Le Mans career
- Years: 1997–2014
- Teams: Joest Racing, BMW Motorsport, Audi Sport Joest, Team Bentley, Audi Sport Goh, Champion Racing
- Best finish: 1st (1997, 2000, 2001, 2002, 2003, 2004, 2005, 2008, 2013)
- Class wins: 9 (1997, 2000, 2001, 2002, 2003, 2004, 2005, 2008, 2013)

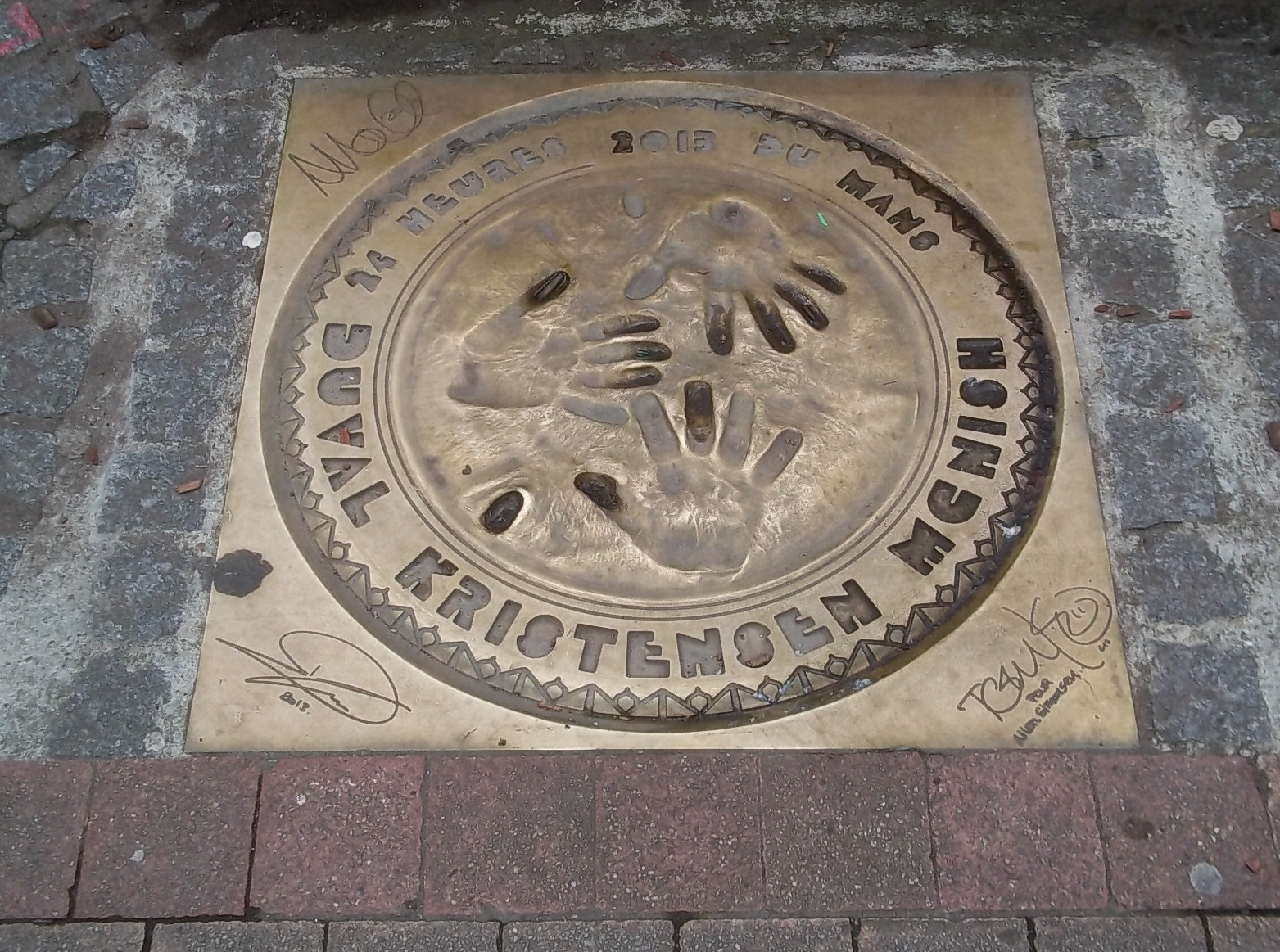
Walk of fame - Le Mans, Handprints and signatures from the winners of the 2013 edition of the 24 Hours of Le Mans

Year	Team	Co-Drivers	Car	Class	Laps	Pos.	Class Pos.
1997	(Germany) Joest Racing	(Italy) Michele Alboreto (Sweden) Stefan Johansson	TWR Porsche WSC-95	LMP	361	**1st**	**1st**
1998	(Germany) Team BMW Motorsport	(Germany) Hans-Joachim Stuck (United Kingdom) Steve Soper	BMW V12 LM	LMP1	60	DNF	DNF
1999	(Germany) Team BMW Motorsport	(Finland) JJ Lehto (Germany) Jörg Müller	BMW V12 LMR	LMP	304	DNF	DNF
2000	(Germany) Audi Sport Team Joest	(Germany) Frank Biela (Italy) Emanuele Pirro	Audi R8	LMP900	368	**1st**	**1st**
2001	(Germany) Audi Sport Team Joest	(Germany) Frank Biela (Italy) Emanuele Pirro	Audi R8	LMP900	321	**1st**	**1st**
2002	(Germany) Audi Sport Team Joest	(Germany) Frank Biela (Italy) Emanuele Pirro	Audi R8	LMP900	375	**1st**	**1st**
2003	(United Kingdom) Team Bentley	(Italy) Rinaldo Capello (United Kingdom) Guy Smith	Bentley Speed 8	LMGTP	377	**1st**	**1st**
2004	Audi Sport Japan Team Goh	(Japan) Seiji Ara (Italy) Rinaldo Capello	Audi R8	LMP1	379	**1st**	**1st**
2005	(United States) ADT Champion Racing	(Finland) JJ Lehto (Germany) Marco Werner	Audi R8	LMP1	370	**1st**	**1st**
2006	(Germany) Audi Sport Team Joest	(Italy) Rinaldo Capello (United Kingdom) Allan McNish	Audi R10 TDI	LMP1	367	**3rd**	**3rd**
2007	(Germany) Audi Sport North America	(Italy) Rinaldo Capello (United Kingdom) Allan McNish	Audi R10 TDI	LMP1	262	DNF	DNF
2008	(Germany) Audi Sport North America	(Italy) Rinaldo Capello (United Kingdom) Allan McNish	Audi R10 TDI	LMP1	381	**1st**	**1st**
2009	(Germany) Audi Sport Team Joest	(Italy) Rinaldo Capello (United Kingdom) Allan McNish	Audi R15 TDI	LMP1	376	**3rd**	**3rd**
2010	(Germany) Audi Sport Team Joest	(Italy) Rinaldo Capello (United Kingdom) Allan McNish	Audi R15 TDI plus	LMP1	394	**3rd**	**3rd**
2011	(Germany) Audi Sport North America	(Italy) Rinaldo Capello (United Kingdom) Allan McNish	Audi R18 TDI	LMP1	14	DNF	DNF
2012	(Germany) Audi Sport Team Joest	(United Kingdom) Allan McNish (Italy) Rinaldo Capello	Audi R18 e-tron quattro	LMP1	377	**2nd**	**2nd**
2013	(Germany) Audi Sport Team Joest	(United Kingdom) Allan McNish (France) Loïc Duval	Audi R18 e-tron quattro	LMP1	348	**1st**	**1st**
2014	(Germany) Audi Sport Team Joest	(Spain) Marc Gené (Brazil) Lucas di Grassi	Audi R18 e-tron quattro	LMP1-H	376	**2nd**	**2nd**

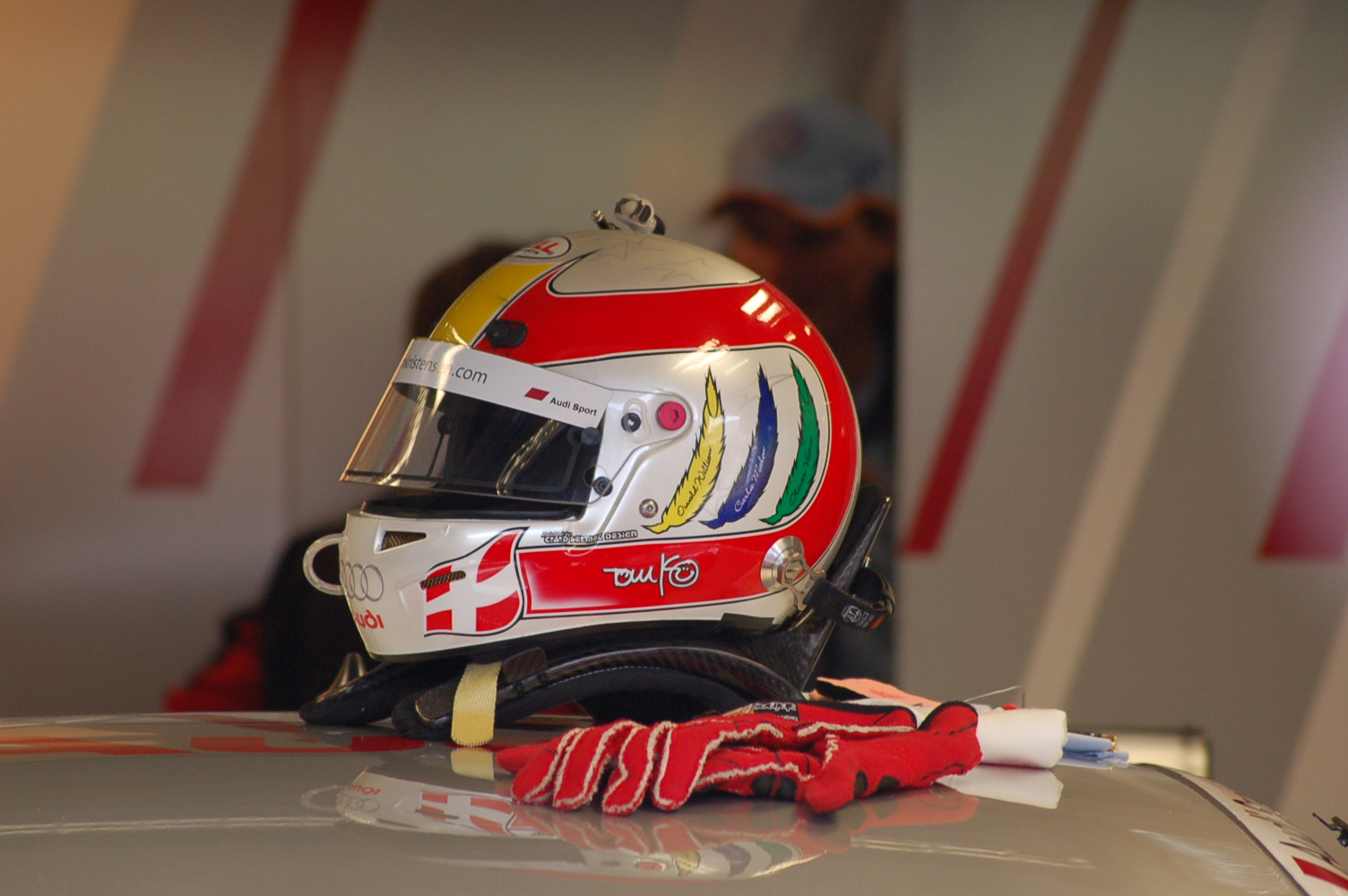
Tom Kristensen's helmet.

=== Complete 12 Hours of Sebring results ===
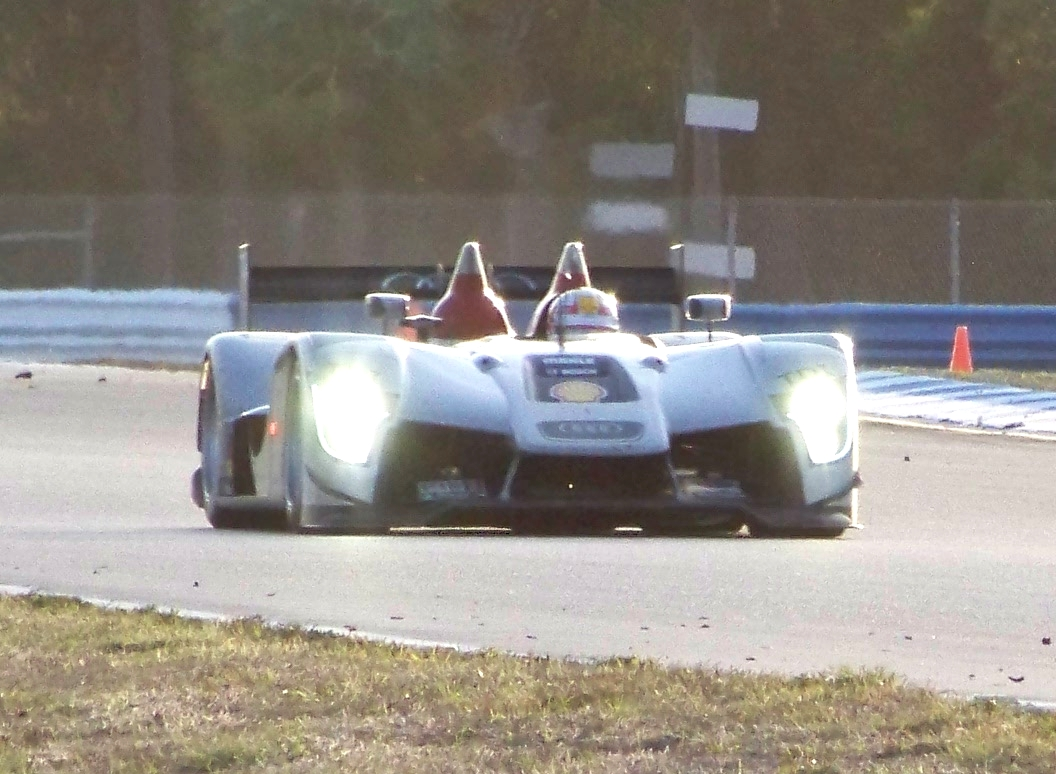
Kristensen driving the Audi R15 TDI which led him to a fifth win at Sebring.

Year	Team	Co-Drivers	Car	Class	Laps	Pos.	Class Pos.
1999	(Germany) BMW Motorsport (Germany) Schnitzer Motorsport	(Germany) Jörg Müller (Finland) JJ Lehto	BMW V12 LMR	LMP	313	**1st**	**1st**
2000	(Germany) Audi Sport North America	(Germany) Frank Biela (Italy) Emanuele Pirro	Audi R8	LMP	360	**1st**	**1st**
2001	(Germany) Audi Sport North America	(Germany) Frank Biela (Italy) Emanuele Pirro	Audi R8	LMP900	370	**2nd**	**2nd**
2002	(Germany) Audi Sport North America	(Germany) Frank Biela (Italy) Emanuele Pirro	Audi R8	LMP900	327	5th	5th
2003	(United Kingdom) Team Bentley	(United Kingdom) Guy Smith (Italy) Rinaldo Capello	Bentley Speed 8	LMGTP	362	4th	**2nd**
2005	(United States) ADT Champion Racing	(Finland) JJ Lehto (Germany) Marco Werner	Audi R8	LMP1	361	**1st**	**1st**
2006	(United States) Audi Sport North America	(Italy) Rinaldo Capello (United Kingdom) Allan McNish	Audi R10 TDI	LMP1	349	**1st**	**1st**
2007	(United States) Audi Sport North America	(Italy) Rinaldo Capello (United Kingdom) Allan McNish	Audi R10 TDI	LMP1	353	4th	**2nd**
2008	(United States) Audi Sport North America	(Italy) Rinaldo Capello (United Kingdom) Allan McNish	Audi R10 TDI	LMP1	351	**3rd**	**1st**
2009	(Germany) Audi Sport Team Joest	(Italy) Rinaldo Capello (United Kingdom) Allan McNish	Audi R15 TDI	LMP1	383	**1st**	**1st**
2011	(Germany) Audi Sport Team Joest	(Italy) Rinaldo Capello (United Kingdom) Allan McNish	Audi R15 TDI plus	LMP1	327	4th	4th
2012	(Germany) Audi Sport Team Joest	(Italy) Rinaldo Capello (United Kingdom) Allan McNish	Audi R18 TDI	LMP1	325	**1st**	**1st**
2013	(Germany) Audi Sport Team Joest	(United Kingdom) Allan McNish (Brazil) Lucas di Grassi	Audi R18 e-tron quattro	P1	364	**2nd**	**2nd**

=== Complete Petit Le Mans results ===
Year	Result	Team	Car	Class
2000	2	Audi Sport North America	Audi R8	LMP
2001	Ret	Audi Sport North America	Audi R8	LMP900
2002	1	Audi Sport North America	Audi R8	LMP900
2010	3	Audi Sport Team Joest	Audi R15 TDI plus	LMP1
2011	DNF	Audi Sport Team Joest	Audi R18	LMP1

=== Complete Super Tourenwagen Cup results ===
(key) (Races in bold indicate pole position) (Races in italics indicate fastest lap)

Year	Team	Car	1	2	3	4	5	6	7	8	9	10	11	12	13	14	15	16	17	18	19	20	DC	Points
1998	JAS Team Honda Sport	Honda Accord	HOC; 1; 9	HOC; 1; 12	NÜR; 1 Ret	NÜR; 2 DNS	SAC; 1; 7	SAC; 2 Ret	NOR; 1; 14	NOR; 2; 8	REG; 1; 8	REG; 2; 16	WUN; 1; 3	WUN; 2; 5	ZWE; 1 Ret	ZWE; 2; 9	**SAL**; **1**; 8	SAL; 2; 7	OSC; 1; 13	OSC; 2; 10	NÜR; 1; 7	NÜR; 2; 5	11th	293
1999	JAS Team Honda Sport	Honda Accord	SAC; 1 Ret	SAC; 2; 6	ZWE; 1 Ret	ZWE; 2; 4	OSC; 1; 2	OSC; 2; 2	NOR; 1; 19	NOR; 2 Ret	MIS; 1 Ret	MIS; 2; 4	NÜR; 1; 16	NÜR; 2; 1	SAL; 1; 4	SAL; 2; 2	OSC; 1; 3	OSC; 2 Ret	HOC; 1; 2	HOC; 2; 1	NÜR; 1; 3	NÜR; 2; 1	3rd	486

=== Complete British Touring Car Championship results ===
(key) (Races in bold indicate pole position – 1 point awarded all races) (Races in italics indicate fastest lap – 1 point awarded all races) (* signifies that driver lead feature races for at least one lap – 1 point awarded)

Year	Team	Car	Class	1	2	3	4	5	6	7	8	9	10	11	12	13	14	15	16	17	18	19	20	21	22	23	24	Pos	Pts
2000	Redstone Team Honda	Honda Accord	S	BRH; 1; 7	BRH; 2 Ret	DON; 1; 5	DON; 2; 6	THR; 1; 9	THR; 2 Ret	KNO; 1; 5	KNO; 2 Ret	OUL; 1; 3	**OUL**; **2**; 1*	SIL; 1; 3	SIL; 2; 6*	CRO; 1; 4	CRO; 2; 9	SNE; 1; 2	SNE; 2 Ret	DON; 1; 10	DON; 2 Ret	BRH; 1; 2	**BRH**; **2**; 8	OUL; 1; 8	OUL; 2 Ret	SIL; 1; 1	**SIL**; **2**; 1*	7th	143

=== Complete Deutsche Tourenwagen Masters results ===
(key)

Year	Team	Car	1	2	3	4	5	6	7	8	9	10	11	Pos	Points
2004	Abt Sportsline	Audi A4 DTM 2004	HOC; 4	EST; 4	ADR; 10	LAU; 10	NOR; 6	SHA^{1} Ret	NÜR; 5	OSC; 1	ZAN; 6	BRN; 2	HOC; 4	4th	43
2005	Abt Sportsline	Audi A4 DTM 2005	HOC; Ret	LAU; 2	SPA; 3	BRN; 2	**OSC**; 5	**NOR**; 7	NÜR; 2	ZAN; 4	LAU; 3	IST; 5	HOC; 4	3rd	56
2006	Abt Sportsline	Audi A4 DTM 2006	HOC; 2	LAU; 2	**OSC**; 1	**BRH**; 18†	NOR; 5	NÜR; 5	ZAN; 1	CAT; 9	BUG; 3	HOC; 3		3rd	56
2007	Abt Sportsline	Audi A4 DTM 2007	HOC; Ret	OSC	LAU	BRH	NOR; 5	MUG; 8	ZAN; 18†	NÜR; 8	CAT; 9†	**HOC**; 6		14th	9
2008	Abt Sportsline	Audi A4 DTM 2008	HOC; 3	OSC; 19†	MUG; 3	LAU; 16	NOR; 7	ZAN; 3	**NÜR**; Ret	BRH; 7	CAT; 13	**BUG**; 8	HOC; 5	8th	27
2009	Abt Sportsline	Audi A4 DTM 2009	HOC; 1	LAU; 12	NOR; 8	ZAN; 8	**OSC**; 8	NÜR; Ret	BRH; 19†	**CAT**; 2	DIJ; 18†	HOC; 15		8th	21
2011	Abt Sportsline	Audi A4 DTM 2009	HOC	ZAN	SPL	LAU; 7	NOR	NÜR	BRH	OSC	VAL	HOC		15th	2

^{1} – A non-championship one-off race was held in 2004 at the streets of Shanghai, China.

- † — Retired, but was classified as he completed 90 per cent of the winner's race distance.

=== Complete Le Mans Series results ===
Year	Entrant	Class	Chassis	Engine	1	2	3	4	5	Rank	Points
2010	Audi Sport Team Joest	LMP1	Audi R15 TDI plus	Audi TDI 5.5 L Turbo V10 (Diesel)	CAS	SPA; 3	ALG	HUN	SIL; Ret	22nd	13
2011	Audi Sport Team Joest	LMP1	Audi R18 TDI	Audi TDI 3.7 L Turbo V6 (Diesel)	CAS	SPA; 3	IMO; 4	SIL; 7	EST	NC	0

=== Complete FIA World Endurance Championship results ===
Year	Entrant	Class	Chassis	Engine	1	2	3	4	5	6	7	8	Rank	Points
2012	Audi Sport Team Joest	LMP1	Audi R18 e-tron quattro	Audi TDI 3.7L Turbo V6 (Hybrid Diesel)	SEB; 1	**SPA**; 3	LMS; 2	SIL; 3	SÃO; 3	**BHR**; 2	FUJ; 3	SHA; 2	2nd	159
2013	Audi Sport Team Joest	LMP1	Audi R18 e-tron quattro	Audi TDI 3.7L Turbo V6 (Hybrid Diesel)	SIL; 1	SPA; 2	**LMS**; 1	SÃO; 2	**COA**; 1	FUJ; 2	SHA; 3	BHR; Ret	1st	162
2014	Audi Sport Team Joest	LMP1	Audi R18 e-tron quattro	Audi TDI 4.0 L Turbo V6 (Hybrid Diesel)	SIL; Ret	SPA; 2	LMS; 2	COA; 2	FUJ; 5	SHA; 5	BHR; 5	SÃO; 3	4th	117

== See also ==
- List of Danish sportspeople

== Notes ==
Sporting positions
Preceded by Michael Schumacher	German Formula Three champion 1991	Succeeded by Pedro Lamy
Preceded by Anthony Reid	Japanese Formula 3 Championship; Champion; 1993	Succeeded by Michael Krumm
Preceded by Manuel Reuter; Davy Jones; Alexander Wurz	Winner of the 24 Hours of Le Mans; 1997; With: Michele Alboreto & Stefan Johansson	Succeeded by Laurent Aïello; Allan McNish; Stéphane Ortelli
Preceded by Pierluigi Martini; Yannick Dalmas; Joachim Winkelhock	Winner of the 24 Hours of Le Mans; 2000, 2001 and 2002; With: Frank Biela & Emanuele Pirro	Succeeded by Tom Kristensen; Rinaldo Capello; Guy Smith
Preceded by Emanuele Pirro	American Le Mans Series; Champion; 2002	Succeeded by Frank Biela; Marco Werner
Preceded by Frank Biela; Tom Kristensen; Emanuele Pirro	Winner of the 24 Hours of Le Mans; 2003; With: Rinaldo Capello & Guy Smith	Succeeded by Seiji Ara; Tom Kristensen; Rinaldo Capello
Preceded by Tom Kristensen; Rinaldo Capello; Guy Smith	Winner of the 24 Hours of Le Mans; 2004; With: Seiji Ara & Rinaldo Capello	Succeeded by J.J. Lehto; Marco Werner; Tom Kristensen
Preceded by Seiji Ara; Tom Kristensen; Rinaldo Capello	Winner of the 24 Hours of Le Mans; 2005; With: J.J. Lehto & Marco Werner	Succeeded by Frank Biela; Emanuele Pirro; Marco Werner
Preceded by Jean Alesi; Sébastien Loeb	Race of Champions Nations' Cup; 2005; With: Mattias Ekström	Succeeded by Marcus Grönholm; Heikki Kovalainen
Preceded by Frank Biela; Emanuele Pirro; Marco Werner	Winner of the 24 Hours of Le Mans; 2008; With: Rinaldo Capello & Allan McNish	Succeeded by David Brabham; Marc Gené; Alexander Wurz
Preceded by André Lotterer; Benoît Tréluyer; Marcel Fässler	Winner of the 24 Hours of Le Mans; 2013; With: Allan McNish & Loïc Duval	Succeeded by André Lotterer; Benoît Tréluyer; Marcel Fässler
Preceded by André Lotterer; Benoît Tréluyer; Marcel Fässler	FIA World Endurance Champion; 2013; With: Allan McNish & Loïc Duval	Succeeded by Sébastien Buemi; Anthony Davidson
Preceded by Michael Schumacher; Sebastian Vettel (2012)	Race of Champions Nations' Cup; 2014; With: Petter Solberg	Succeeded by Jason Plato; Andy Priaulx
Preceded by René Rast; Timo Bernhard	Race of Champions Nations' Cup; 2019; With: Johan Kristoffersson	Succeeded by Petter Solberg; Oliver Solberg
