= 1991 German Formula Three Championship =

Multi-event motor racing championship

Seasons
- ← 1990 1992 →

The 1991 German Formula Three Championship (German: 1991 Deutsche Formel-3-Meisterschaft) was a multi-event motor racing championship for single-seat open wheel formula racing cars that held across Europe. The championship featured drivers competing in two-litre Formula Three racing cars which conform to the technical regulations, or formula, for the championship. It commenced on 31 March at Zolder and ended at Hockenheim on 28 September after eleven rounds.

Volkswagen Motorsport driver Tom Kristensen became a champion. He won three races and scored another four podium finishes to clinch the championship title. Marco Werner finished as runner-up, winning on Diepholz Airfield Circuit. Marc Hessel was victorious at Norisring, completing the top-three in the drivers' championship. Frank Krämer, Klaus Panchyrz, Peter Kox and Wolfgang Kaufmann were the other race winners. Mathias Arlt clinched the B-Cup championship title.

== Teams and drivers ==
Entry List
Team	No.	Driver	Chassis	Engine	Rounds
Class A
(Germany) Opel Team WTS	1	(Germany) Frank Krämer	Reynard 913/006	Opel	All
(Germany) Opel Team WTS	2	(United States) Markus Liesner	Reynard 913/017	Opel	All
(Germany) Volkswagen Motorsport	3	(Germany) Klaus Panchyrz	Ralt RT35/884	Volkswagen	All
(Germany) Volkswagen Motorsport	4	(Denmark) Tom Kristensen	Ralt RT35/892	Volkswagen	All
(Germany) Opel Team Schübel	5	(Switzerland) Jacques Isler	Dallara 391/040	Opel	1
(Germany) Opel Team Schübel	6	(Germany) Wolfgang Kaufmann	Dallara 391/038	Opel	1–8
(Germany) Opel Team Schübel	6	(United Kingdom) Jonathan McGall	Dallara 391/038	Opel	9
(Germany) Opel Team Schübel	6	(Argentina) José Luis Di Palma	Dallara 391/038	Opel	10
(Germany) Opel Team Schübel	18	(Switzerland) Yolanda Surer	Dallara 391/039	Opel	1, 3
(Switzerland) Jacques Isler Racing	5	(Switzerland) Jacques Isler	Dallara 391/040	Alfa Romeo	7, 10–11
(Switzerland) Jacques Isler Racing	18	(Switzerland) Yolanda Surer	Dallara 391/039	Alfa Romeo	7, 10–11
(Germany) Mönninghoff Sport Promotion	7	(Germany) Marc Hessel	Ralt RT35/901	Mugen-Honda	All
(Germany) Bongers Motorsport	8	(Austria) Franz Binder	Reynard 913/007	Opel	1–4, 6–11
(Germany) Bongers Motorsport	9	(Germany) Jörg Müller	Reynard 913/005	Volkswagen	All
(Germany) Eufra Racing Team	10	(Netherlands) Peter Kox	Eufra 391/03	Mugen-Honda	All
(Germany) Eufra Racing Team	11	(Germany) Meik Wagner	Eufra 391/02	Mugen-Honda	1–9
(Germany) Eufra Racing Team	11	(France) Arnaud Trevisiol	Eufra 391/02	Mugen-Honda	10–11
(Germany) G+M Escom Motorsport	12	(Germany) Marco Werner	Ralt RT35/876	Opel	All
(Austria) Vienna Racing	15	(Austria) Philipp Peter	Eufra 390/03	Opel	All
(Austria) Vienna Racing	16	(Germany) Danny Pfeil	Eufra 391/01	Opel	4, 11
(Austria) RSM Marko	20	(Germany) Joachim Koscielniak	Reynard 913/014	Alfa Romeo	1
(Austria) RSM Marko	20	(Republic of Ireland) Derek Higgins	Reynard 913/014	Alfa Romeo	2
(Austria) RSM Marko	20	(Germany) Markus Grossmann	Reynard 913/014	Alfa Romeo	3–11
(Austria) RSM Marko	21	(Germany) Sascha Maassen	Reynard 913/015	Alfa Romeo	All
(Sweden) Picko Troberg Racing	23	(Sweden) Linus Lundberg	Ralt RT35/933	Volkswagen	11
Class B
(Germany) H&R Spezialfedern — Lohmann Motorsport	50	(Austria) Claudia Kreuzsaler	Dallara 389/020	Volkswagen	1–5
(Germany) H&R Spezialfedern — Lohmann Motorsport	50	(Germany) Thorsten Kern	Dallara 389/020	Volkswagen	8
(Germany) H&R Spezialfedern — Lohmann Motorsport	50	(Switzerland) Attila Fabian	Dallara 389/020	Volkswagen	9–11
(Germany) Pfeil Motorsport — Beru Zündtechnik F3 Team	51	(Germany) Mathias Arlt	Eufra 390/01	Volkswagen	All
(Switzerland) Formel Rennsport Club	52	(Switzerland) Rene Wartmann	Reynard 903/007	Volkswagen	All
(Netherlands) Nomag Racing	53	(Netherlands) Franc ten Wolde	Ralt RT33/797	Volkswagen	6–8
(Germany) Peter Katsarski	54	(Germany) Peter Katsarski	Reynard 893/120	Opel	4
(Switzerland) Peter Schär	55	(Switzerland) Peter Schär	Ralt RT34/820	Volkswagen	All
(Germany) Hohenester Sport	56	(Germany) Horst Farnbacher	Reynard 903/002	Volkswagen	1–4
(Germany) Hohenester Sport	56	(Germany) Ralf Eisenreich	Reynard 903/002	Volkswagen	5–6, 8–9
(Austria) Walter Penker Fahrtraining	57	(Austria) Peter Wieser	Eufra 390/02	Volkswagen	5, 7–11
(Austria) Dimo Sport	59	(Germany) Logan Wilms	Reynard 893/078	Volkswagen	6
(Germany) MSC Scuderia Mitwitz	60	(Germany) Justin Sünkel	Reynard 893/077	Volkswagen	1, 5–7, 9
(Germany) Dimo Sport	61	(Denmark) Svend Hansen	Ralt RT33/802	Volkswagen	6–11
(Hungary) Hungaria Biztosito Autosport	62	(Hungary) László Szász	Reynard 903/040	Mugen-Honda	2–4
(Austria) Ewald Kapferer	69	(Austria) Ewald Kapferer	Ralt RT34/818	Volkswagen	4–5, 7, 9
(Austria) Franz Wöss	69	(Austria) Franz Wöss	Ralt RT34/818	Volkswagen	10–11
(Switzerland) Roger Studhalter	70	(Switzerland) Roger Studhalter	Dallara 389/010	Volkswagen	7
(Switzerland) Gianni Bianchi	71	(Switzerland) Gianni Bianchi	Dallara 390/036	Opel	7
(Germany) Opel Team WTS	72	(Germany) Joachim Beule	Reynard 903/001	Opel	7
(Germany) Mönninghoff Sport Promotion	75	(Austria) Josef Neuhauser	Reynard 903/014	Volkswagen	All
(Germany) Joachim Ryschka	77	(Germany) Joachim Ryschka	Reynard 903/038	Volkswagen	1–9, 11
(Sweden) Picko Troberg Racing	78	(Sweden) Claes Rothstein	Ralt RT33/781	Volkswagen	11
(South Africa) Fred Goddard Racing	79	(Finland) Pekka Herva	Ralt RT34/859	Mugen-Honda	11

== Calendar ==
Round	Location	Circuit	Date	Supporting
1	Heusden-Zolder, Belgium	Circuit Zolder	31 March	XXII. AvD "Bergischer Löwe"
2	Hockenheim, Germany	Hockenheimring	14 April	AvD/MAC Rennsport-Festival
3	Nürburg, Germany	Nürburgring	21 April	53. ADAC Eifelrennen
4	Berlin, Germany	AVUS	5 May	ADAC-Avus-Rennen
5	Most, Czechoslovakia	Autodrom Most	2 June	ADAC-Rundstreckenrennen Würzburg"
6	Wunstorf, Germany	Wunstorf	8 June	ADAC-Flugplatzrennen Wunstorf
7	Nuremberg, Germany	Norisring	29 June	200 Meilen von Nürnberg
8	Diepholz, Germany	Diepholz Airfield Circuit	3 August	24. ADAC-Flugplatzrennen Diepholz
9	Nürburg, Germany	Nürburgring	18 August	ADAC Sportwagen-Weltmeisterschaft
10	Nürburg, Germany	Nürburgring	7 September	ADAC Großer Preis der Tourenwagen
11	Hockenheim, Germany	Hockenheimring	28 September	ADAC-Preis Hockenheim

== Results ==
Round	Circuit	Pole position	Fastest lap	Winning driver	Winning team	B Class Winner
1	(Belgium) Circuit Zolder	(Denmark) Tom Kristensen	(Germany) Klaus Panchyrz	(Denmark) Tom Kristensen	(Germany) Volkswagen Motorsport	(Switzerland) Peter Schär
2	(Germany) Hockenheimring	(Germany) Klaus Panchyrz	(Denmark) Tom Kristensen	(Germany) Wolfgang Kaufmann	(Germany) Opel Team Schübel	(Germany) Mathias Arlt
3	(Germany) Nürburgring	(Denmark) Tom Kristensen	(Netherlands) Peter Kox	(Germany) Klaus Panchyrz	(Germany) Volkswagen Motorsport	(Switzerland) Peter Schär
4	(Germany) AVUS	(Denmark) Tom Kristensen	(Netherlands) Peter Kox	(Netherlands) Peter Kox	(Germany) Eufra Racing Team	(Switzerland) Rene Wartmann
5	(Czechoslovakia) Autodrom Most	(Denmark) Tom Kristensen	(Germany) Meik Wagner	(Netherlands) Peter Kox	(Germany) Eufra Racing Team	(Germany) Mathias Arlt
6	(Germany) Wunstorf	(Germany) Wolfgang Kaufmann	(Germany) Wolfgang Kaufmann	(Germany) Wolfgang Kaufmann	(Germany) Opel Team Schübel	(Germany) Mathias Arlt
7	(Germany) Norisring	(Germany) Wolfgang Kaufmann	(Germany) Klaus Panchyrz	(Germany) Marc Hessel	(Germany) Mönninghoff Sport Promotion	(Denmark) Svend Hansen
8	(Germany) Diepholz Airfield Circuit	(Germany) Marco Werner	(Germany) Marco Werner	(Germany) Marco Werner	(Germany) G+M Escom Motorsport	(Switzerland) Rene Wartmann
9	(Germany) Nürburgring	(Denmark) Tom Kristensen	(Denmark) Tom Kristensen	(Denmark) Tom Kristensen	(Germany) Volkswagen Motorsport	(Denmark) Svend Hansen
10	(Germany) Nürburgring	(Netherlands) Peter Kox	(Germany) Klaus Panchyrz	(Germany) Frank Krämer	(Germany) Opel Team WTS	(Denmark) Svend Hansen
11	(Germany) Hockenheimring	(Denmark) Tom Kristensen	(Denmark) Tom Kristensen	(Denmark) Tom Kristensen	(Germany) Volkswagen Motorsport	(Finland) Pekka Herva

== Championship standings ==
=== A-Class ===
- Points are awarded as follows:

1	2	3	4	5	6	7	8	9	10
20	15	12	10	8	6	4	3	2	1

Pos	Driver	ZOL (Belgium)	HOC1 (Germany)	NÜR1 (Germany)	AVU (Germany)	MST (Czechoslovakia)	WUN (Germany)	NOR (Germany)	DIE (Germany)	NÜR2 (Germany)	NÜR3 (Germany)	HOC2 (Germany)	Points
1	(Denmark) Tom Kristensen	**1**	2	**2**	**16**	**2**	5	18	2	**1**	5	**1**	136
2	(Germany) Marco Werner	3	3	5	2	Ret	7	3	**1**	6	14	3	101
3	(Germany) Marc Hessel	4	11	7	Ret	4	3	1	3	Ret	2	4	93
4	(Germany) Jörg Müller	2	4	8	14	3	Ret	4	Ret	4	4	2	85
5	(Germany) Frank Krämer	5	5	6	Ret	15	6	2	Ret	3	1	5	83
6	(Germany) Klaus Panchyrz	Ret	**Ret**	1	3	5	4	Ret	DNS	Ret	3	6	68
7	(Netherlands) Peter Kox	13	Ret	3	1	1	2	Ret	DNS	Ret	**DSQ**	Ret	67
8	(Germany) Wolfgang Kaufmann	Ret	1	4	4	Ret	**1**	**6**	Ret				66
9	(Germany) Sascha Maassen	Ret	7	10	5	13	10	DNS	Ret	2	6	9	37
10	(Austria) Franz Binder	6	8	13	6		8	5	4	DNS	11	10	37
11	(Germany) Markus Grossmann			11	Ret	6	9	8	11	7	7	Ret	19
12	(Germany) Mathias Arlt	10	10	15	9	7	11	16	6	11	15	12	14
13	(Switzerland) Rene Wartmann	Ret	DNS	16	7	14	DNS	14	5	13	17	14	12
14	(Germany) Meik Wagner	17	6	9	13	Ret	Ret	Ret	9	9		19	12
15	(United States) Markus Liesner	7	13	12	17	9	13	7	Ret	DNS	9	18	12
16	(United Kingdom) Jonathan McGall									5			8
17	(Austria) Philipp Peter	12	9		Ret			9	10	8	Ret	13	8
18	(Switzerland) Peter Schär	8	12	14	8	Ret	12	12	Ret	14	13		6
19	(Austria) Josef Neuhauser	9	Ret	17	Ret	Ret	14	17	8	12	20	17	5
20	(Netherlands) Franc ten Wolde						Ret	11	7				4
21	(Sweden) Linus Lundberg											7	4
22	(Germany) Ralf Eisenreich					8	DNQ		Ret	Ret			3
23	(France) Arnaud Trevisiol										8	Ret	3
24	(Finland) Pekka Herva											8	3
25	(Denmark) Svend Hansen						Ret	10	DNS	10	12	15	2
26	(Hungary) László Szász		17	19	10	DNS							1
27	(Austria) Ewald Kapferer				12	10		DNQ		16			1
28	(Argentina) José Luis Di Palma										10		1
29	(Germany) Joachim Ryschka	15	15	20	11	11	Ret	DNQ	Ret	17		DNS	0
30	(Germany) Horst Farnbacher	11	14	DNS	18								0
31	(Sweden) Claes Rothstein											11	0
32	(Germany) Justin Sünkel	Ret				12	15	DNQ		18			0
33	(Austria) Peter Wieser					DNS		13	DSQ	Ret	16	Ret	0
34	(Switzerland) Jacques Isler	14						DNS			22	Ret	0
36	(Austria) Claudia Kreuzsaler	16	16	21	15	DNS							0
36	(Switzerland) Attila Fabian									15	18	16	0
37	(Switzerland) Yolanda Surer	DNS		18				15			19	Ret	0
38	(Germany) Logan Wilms						16						0
39	(Republic of Ireland) Derek Higgins		18										0
40	(Austria) Franz Wöss										21	Ret	0
	(Germany) Joachim Koscielniak	Ret											0
	(Germany) Joachim Beule							Ret					0
	(Germany) Thorsten Kern								Ret				0
	(Germany) Danny Pfeil				DNS							DNS	0
	(Germany) Peter Katsarski				DNS								0
	(Switzerland) Gianni Bianchi							DNQ					0
	(Switzerland) Roger Studhalter							DNQ					0
Pos	Driver	ZOL (Belgium)	HOC1 (Germany)	NÜR1 (Germany)	AVU (Germany)	MST (Czechoslovakia)	WUN (Germany)	NOR (Germany)	DIE (Germany)	NÜR2 (Germany)	NÜR3 (Germany)	HOC2 (Germany)	Points

Colour	Result
Gold	Winner
Silver	Second place
Bronze	Third place
Green	Points classification
Blue	Non-points classification
Blue	Non-classified finish (NC)
Purple	Retired, not classified (Ret)
Red	Did not qualify (DNQ)
Red	Did not pre-qualify (DNPQ)
Black	Disqualified (DSQ)
White	Did not start (DNS)
White	Withdrew (WD)
White	Race cancelled (C)
Blank	Did not practice (DNP)
Blank	Did not arrive (DNA)
Blank	Excluded (EX)

**Bold** – Pole
Italics – Fastest Lap
