= 1996 ITC Diepholz round =

(Germany) 1996 ITC Diepholz round
Round details
- Round 6 of 13 rounds in the 1996 International Touring Car Championship
- Layout of the Diepholz Airfield Circuit
- Location: Diepholz Airfield Circuit, Diepholz, Germany
- Course: Permanent racing facility 2.720 km (1.690 mi)

International Touring Car Championship

Race 1
- Date: 7 July 1996
- Laps: 28

Pole position
Driver	(Germany) Bernd Schneider	D2 Mercedes-AMG
- Time: 56.957

Podium
First	(Germany) Bernd Schneider	D2 Mercedes-AMG
Second	(United Kingdom) Dario Franchitti	D2 Mercedes-AMG
Third	(Italy) Giancarlo Fisichella	TV Spielfilm Alfa Corse

Fastest lap
Driver	(Germany) Bernd Schneider	D2 Mercedes-AMG
- Time: 57.850 (on lap 4)

Race 2
- Date: 7 July 1996
- Laps: 37

Podium
First	(Germany) Bernd Schneider	D2 Mercedes-AMG
Second	(United Kingdom) Dario Franchitti	D2 Mercedes-AMG
Third	(Italy) Stefano Modena	JAS Motorsport Alfa Romeo

Fastest lap
Driver	(Austria) Alexander Wurz	Joest Racing Opel
- Time: 57.735 (on lap 5)

The 1996 ITC Diepholz round was the sixth round of the 1996 International Touring Car Championship season. It took place on 7 July at the Diepholz Airfield Circuit.

Bernd Schneider won both races, driving a Mercedes C-Class.

== Classification ==
=== Qualifying ===
Pos.	No.	Driver	Car	Team	Time	Group	Grid
1	1	(Germany) Bernd Schneider	Mercedes C-Class	(Germany) D2 Mercedes-AMG	56.957	A	1
2	2	(United Kingdom) Dario Franchitti	Mercedes C-Class	(Germany) D2 Mercedes-AMG	56.964	A	2
3	18	(Italy) Gabriele Tarquini	Alfa Romeo 155 V6 TI	(Italy) JAS Motorsport Alfa Romeo	57.149	A	3
4	14	(Italy) Giancarlo Fisichella	Alfa Romeo 155 V6 TI	(Italy) TV Spielfilm Alfa Corse	57.236	A	4
5	44	(Germany) Hans-Joachim Stuck	Opel Calibra V6 4x4	(Germany) Team Rosberg Opel	57.255	A	5
6	43	(Finland) JJ Lehto	Opel Calibra V6 4x4	(Germany) Team Rosberg Opel	57.311	A	6
7	7	(Germany) Manuel Reuter	Opel Calibra V6 4x4	(Germany) Joest Racing Opel	57.619	A	7
8	16	(Germany) Uwe Alzen	Opel Calibra V6 4x4	(Germany) Zakspeed Opel	57.698	A	8
9	12	(Germany) Kurt Thiim	Mercedes C-Class	(Germany) UPS Mercedes-AMG	57.776	A	9
10	10	(Germany) Michael Bartels	Alfa Romeo 155 V6 TI	(Italy) Jägermeister JAS Motorsport Alfa Romeo	57.786	A	10
11	11	(Germany) Jörg van Ommen	Mercedes C-Class	(Germany) UPS Mercedes-AMG	57.116	B	11
12	17	(Germany) Klaus Ludwig	Opel Calibra V6 4x4	(Germany) Zakspeed Opel	57.130	B	12
13	6	(Italy) Alessandro Nannini	Alfa Romeo 155 V6 TI	(Italy) Martini Alfa Corse	57.297	B	13
14	3	(Denmark) Jan Magnussen	Mercedes C-Class	(Germany) Warsteiner Mercedes-AMG	57.386	B	14
15	24	(France) Yannick Dalmas	Opel Calibra V6 4x4	(Germany) Joest Racing Opel	57.406	B	15
16	25	(Austria) Alexander Wurz	Opel Calibra V6 4x4	(Germany) Joest Racing Opel	57.469	B	16
17	9	(Italy) Stefano Modena	Alfa Romeo 155 V6 TI	(Italy) JAS Motorsport Alfa Romeo	57.553	B	17
18	5	(Italy) Nicola Larini	Alfa Romeo 155 V6 TI	(Italy) Martini Alfa Corse	57.776	B	18
19	15	(Germany) Christian Danner	Alfa Romeo 155 V6 TI	(Italy) TV Spielfilm Alfa Corse	57.888	B	19
20	8	(United Kingdom) Oliver Gavin	Opel Calibra V6 4x4	(Germany) Joest Racing Opel	58.298	B	20
21	4	(Germany) Alexander Grau	Mercedes C-Class	(Germany) Warsteiner Mercedes-AMG	58.535	B	21
22	19	(Denmark) Jason Watt	Alfa Romeo 155 V6 TI	(Italy) Bosch JAS Motorsport Alfa Romeo	58.636	B	22
23	22	(Germany) Bernd Mayländer	Mercedes C-Class	(Germany) Persson Motorsport	59.022	B	23
24	21	(Germany) Ellen Lohr	Mercedes C-Class	(Germany) Persson Motorsport	59.657	B	24
25	13	(Italy) Gianni Giudici	Opel Calibra V6 4x4	(Italy) Giudici Motorsport	1:00.697	B	25
26	37	(Thailand) Ratanakul Prutirat	Mercedes C-Class	(Germany) Persson Motorsport	no time	B	DNQ^{1}

Notes:

- ^1 – Ratanakul Prutirat failed to set a lap time within 107% of the fastest time during the weekend. As a result, the driver failed to qualify for the race.

=== Race 1 ===
Pos.	No.	Driver	Car	Team	Laps	Time/Retired	Grid	Points
1	1	(Germany) Bernd Schneider	Mercedes C-Class	(Germany) D2 Mercedes-AMG	28^{1}	27:23.047	1	20
2	2	(United Kingdom) Dario Franchitti	Mercedes C-Class	(Germany) D2 Mercedes-AMG	28	+3.237	2	15
3	14	(Italy) Giancarlo Fisichella	Alfa Romeo 155 V6 TI	(Italy) TV Spielfilm Alfa Corse	28	+10.446	4	12
4	9	(Italy) Stefano Modena	Alfa Romeo 155 V6 TI	(Italy) JAS Motorsport Alfa Romeo	28	+11.550	17	10
5	44	(Germany) Hans-Joachim Stuck	Opel Calibra V6 4x4	(Germany) Team Rosberg Opel	28	+15.291	5	8
6	6	(Italy) Alessandro Nannini	Alfa Romeo 155 V6 TI	(Italy) Martini Alfa Corse	28	+16.507	13	6
7	43	(Finland) JJ Lehto	Opel Calibra V6 4x4	(Germany) Team Rosberg Opel	28	+18.596	6	4
8	10	(Germany) Michael Bartels	Alfa Romeo 155 V6 TI	(Italy) Jägermeister JAS Motorsport Alfa Romeo	28	+20.976	10	3
9	25	(Austria) Alexander Wurz	Opel Calibra V6 4x4	(Germany) Joest Racing Opel	28	+21.738	16	2
10	7	(Germany) Manuel Reuter	Opel Calibra V6 4x4	(Germany) Joest Racing Opel	28	+28.907	7	1
11	16	(Germany) Uwe Alzen	Opel Calibra V6 4x4	(Germany) Team Rosberg Opel	28	+29.205	8	
12	24	(France) Yannick Dalmas	Opel Calibra V6 4x4	(Germany) Joest Racing Opel	28	+30.138	15	
13	11	(Germany) Jörg van Ommen	Mercedes C-Class	(Germany) UPS Mercedes-AMG	28	+33.589	11	
14	12	(Denmark) Kurt Thiim	Mercedes C-Class	(Germany) UPS Mercedes-AMG	28	+34.577	9	
15	15	(Germany) Christian Danner	Alfa Romeo 155 V6 TI	(Italy) TV Spielfilm Alfa Corse	28	+40.267	19	
16	3	(Denmark) Jan Magnussen	Mercedes C-Class	(Germany) Warsteiner Mercedes-AMG	28	+40.560	14	
17	8	(United Kingdom) Oliver Gavin	Opel Calibra V6 4x4	(Germany) Joest Racing Opel	28	+41.004	20	
18	4	(Germany) Alexander Grau	Mercedes C-Class	(Germany) Warsteiner Mercedes-AMG	28	+50.189	16	
19	22	(Germany) Bernd Mayländer	Mercedes C-Class	(Germany) Persson Motorsport	28	+50.695	23	
20	18	(Italy) Gabriele Tarquini	Alfa Romeo 155 V6 TI	(Italy) JAS Motorsport Alfa Romeo	27	+1 lap	3	
21	21	(Germany) Ellen Lohr	Mercedes C-Class	(Germany) Persson Motorsport	27	+1 lap	24	
22	19	(Denmark) Jason Watt	Alfa Romeo 155 V6 TI	(Italy) Bosch JAS Motorsport Alfa Romeo	27	+1 lap	22	
Ret	17	(Germany) Klaus Ludwig	Opel Calibra V6 4x4	(Germany) Zakspeed Opel	25	Retired	12	
Ret	5	(Italy) Nicola Larini	Alfa Romeo 155 V6 TI	(Italy) Martini Alfa Corse	25	Retired	18	
Ret	13	(Italy) Gianni Giudici	Opel Calibra V6 4x4	(Italy) Giudici Motorsport	13	Retired	25	
DNQ	37	(Thailand) Ratanakul Prutirat	Mercedes C-Class	(Germany) Persson Motorsport		Did not qualify		

Notes:

- ^1 – The race was red-flagged on lap 29 and not restarted after Gabriele Tarquini's crash.

=== Race 2 ===
Pos.	No.	Driver	Car	Team	Laps	Time/Retired	Grid	Points
1	1	(Germany) Bernd Schneider	Mercedes C-Class	(Germany) D2 Mercedes-AMG	37	36:09.296	1	20
2	2	(United Kingdom) Dario Franchitti	Mercedes C-Class	(Germany) D2 Mercedes-AMG	37	+2.749	2	15
3	9	(Italy) Stefano Modena	Alfa Romeo 155 V6 TI	(Italy) JAS Motorsport Alfa Romeo	37	+9.430	4	12
4	44	(Germany) Hans-Joachim Stuck	Opel Calibra V6 4x4	(Germany) Team Rosberg Opel	37	+15.002	5	10
5	11	(Germany) Jörg van Ommen	Mercedes C-Class	(Germany) UPS Mercedes-AMG	37	+28.043	13	8
6	7	(Germany) Manuel Reuter	Opel Calibra V6 4x4	(Germany) Joest Racing Opel	37	+28.654	10	6
7	24	(France) Yannick Dalmas	Opel Calibra V6 4x4	(Germany) Joest Racing Opel	37	+31.119	12	4
8	25	(Austria) Alexander Wurz	Opel Calibra V6 4x4	(Germany) Joest Racing Opel	37	+36.229	9	3
9	8	(United Kingdom) Oliver Gavin	Opel Calibra V6 4x4	(Germany) Joest Racing Opel	37	+36.559	17	2
10	16	(Germany) Uwe Alzen	Opel Calibra V6 4x4	(Germany) Zakspeed Opel	37	+36.773	11	1
11	12	(Denmark) Kurt Thiim	Mercedes C-Class	(Germany) UPS Mercedes-AMG	37	+52.154	14	
12	19	(Denmark) Jason Watt	Alfa Romeo 155 V6 TI	(Italy) Bosch JAS Motorsport Alfa Romeo	36	+1 lap	22	
13	21	(Germany) Ellen Lohr	Mercedes C-Class	(Germany) Persson Motorsport	36	+1 lap	21	
14	22	(Germany) Bernd Mayländer	Mercedes C-Class	(Germany) Persson Motorsport	36	+1 lap	19	
Ret	10	(Germany) Michael Bartels	Alfa Romeo 155 V6 TI	(Italy) Jägermeister JAS Motorsport Alfa Romeo	31	Retired	8	
Ret	4	(Germany) Alexander Grau	Mercedes C-Class	(Germany) Warsteiner Mercedes-AMG	28	Retired	18	
Ret	6	(Italy) Alessandro Nannini	Alfa Romeo 155 V6 TI	(Italy) Martini Alfa Corse	24	Retired	6	
Ret	15	(Germany) Christian Danner	Alfa Romeo 155 V6 TI	(Italy) TV Spielfilm Alfa Corse	22	Retired	15	
Ret	13	(Italy) Gianni Giudici	Opel Calibra V6 4x4	(Italy) Giudici Motorsport	12	Retired	25	
Ret	43	(Finland) JJ Lehto	Opel Calibra V6 4x4	(Germany) Team Rosberg Opel	9	Retired	7	
Ret	14	(Italy) Giancarlo Fisichella	Alfa Romeo 155 V6 TI	(Italy) TV Spielfilm Alfa Corse	8	Retired	3	
Ret	3	(Denmark) Jan Magnussen	Mercedes C-Class	(Germany) Warsteiner Mercedes-AMG	6	Retired	16	
Ret	17	(Germany) Klaus Ludwig	Opel Calibra V6 4x4	(Germany) Zakspeed Opel	4	Retired	23	
DNS	18	(Italy) Gabriele Tarquini	Alfa Romeo 155 V6 TI	(Italy) JAS Motorsport Alfa Romeo		Did not start	20	
DNS	5	(Italy) Nicola Larini	Alfa Romeo 155 V6 TI	(Italy) Martini Alfa Corse		Did not start	24	
DNQ	37	(Thailand) Ratanakul Prutirat	Mercedes C-Class	(Germany) Persson Motorsport		Did not qualify		

== Standings after the event ==
Drivers' Championship standings

	Pos	Driver	Points
	1	(Germany) Manuel Reuter	137
	2	(Germany) Hans-Joachim Stuck	94
6	3	(Germany) Bernd Schneider	89
4	4	(United Kingdom) Dario Franchitti	81
2	5	(Germany) Uwe Alzen	73

Manufacturers' Championship standings

Pos	Driver	Points
1	(Germany) Opel	189
2	(Germany) Mercedes	141
3	(Italy) Alfa Romeo	111

- Note: Only the top five positions are included for both sets of drivers' standings.
