= 1989 German Formula Three Championship =

Seasons
- ← 1988 1990 →

The 1989 German Formula Three Championship (German: 1989 Deutsche Formel-3-Meisterschaft) was a multi-event motor racing championship for single-seat open wheel formula racing cars that held across Europe. The championship featured drivers competing in two-litre Formula Three racing cars which conform to the technical regulations, or formula, for the championship. It commenced on 16 April at Hockenheim and ended at the same place on 30 September after twelve rounds.

Krafft Walzen Team Marko RSM driver Karl Wendlinger became the champion. He won one of the tightest championship battle in the history of the German Formula Three, as top-three drivers in the drivers were divided just by one point. Heinz-Harald Frentzen finished as runner-up and had one more race victory than other drivers in top-three. Michael Schumacher was equal on points with Frentzen and victorious at Zeltweg and Nürburgring. Michael Bartels, Peter Zakowski and Frank Krämer were the other race winners. Franz Engstler clinched the B-Cup championship title.

== Teams and drivers ==
Entry List
Team	No.	Driver	Chassis	Engine	Rounds
Class A
(West Germany) West WTS Racing	1	(West Germany) Frank Schmickler	Reynard 893/059	Volkswagen	All
(West Germany) ONS Nachwuchsteam — WTS Racing	2	(West Germany) Michael Schumacher	Reynard 893/058	Volkswagen	All
(West Germany) Volkswagen Motorsport	3	(West Germany) Frank Krämer	BSR 389/02	Volkswagen	1–9
(West Germany) Volkswagen Motorsport	3	(West Germany) Marco Werner	BSR 389/02	Volkswagen	11–12
(West Germany) Volkswagen Motorsport	4	(West Germany) Ellen Lohr	BSR 389/01	Volkswagen	All
(West Germany) Cosy Informatik Systeme	5	(West Germany) Michael Roppes	Martini MK58/01	Volkswagen	All
(Switzerland) Zimmspeed Racing Team	6	(Switzerland) Hanspeter Kaufmann	Dallara 389/025	Volkswagen	4–6, 8
(West Germany) Bongers Motorsport	7	(West Germany) Michael Bartels	Reynard 893/055	Volkswagen	All
(West Germany) Bongers Motorsport	8	(Switzerland) Daniel Müller	Reynard 893/063	Volkswagen	1–8
(West Germany) Team JSK Baumanagement	9	(West Germany) Frank Biela	Reynard 893/077	Volkswagen	1–4, 6–9
(West Germany) Team JSK Baumanagement	10	(West Germany) Heinz-Harald Frentzen	Dallara 389/025	Volkswagen	All
(West Germany) Opel Team Deutschland	9	(West Germany) Frank Krämer	Reynard 893/077	Opel	10–12
(West Germany) Style Auto Racing Team	11	(West Germany) Wolfgang Kaufmann	Dallara 388/033	Volkswagen	All
(West Germany) Mönninghoff Sympathik Racing	12	(West Germany) Ralf Kelleners	Reynard 893/079	Volkswagen	1–2
(West Germany) Mönninghoff Sympathik Racing	12	(Netherlands) Gerrit van Kouwen	Reynard 893/079	Volkswagen	4, 6–8, 10
(West Germany) Mönninghoff Sympathik Racing	12	(West Germany) Klaus Panchyrz	Reynard 893/079	Volkswagen	11–12
(West Germany) Peter Zakowski Racing	13	(West Germany) Peter Zakowski	Reynard 893/078	Volkswagen	All
(Austria) Krafft Walzen Team Marko RSM	14	(Austria) Karl Wendlinger	Ralt RT33/797	Alfa Romeo	All
(West Germany) HC Hessel Motorsport	17	(West Germany) Marc Hessel	Reynard 893/098	Volkswagen	1–11
(West Germany) HC Hessel Motorsport	18	(West Germany) Georg Arbinger	Reynard 893/097	Volkswagen	1–7
(West Germany) Eufra Racing	21	(Argentina) Víctor Rosso	Tark Aleko JK173/02	Volkswagen	1–6, 8
(West Germany) Eufra Racing	21	(West Germany) Meik Wagner	Tark Aleko JK173/02	Volkswagen	5, 9–12
(West Germany) Eufra Racing	22	(West Germany) Ralf Kelleners	Tark Aleko JK173/01	Volkswagen	3–12
(West Germany) Gätmo Motorsport	23	(West Germany) Meik Wagner	Reynard 893	Volkswagen	1, 4–7, 9–12
(West Germany) Gätmo Motorsport	24	(Switzerland) Flurin Zegg	Reynard 893	Volkswagen	6
(Switzerland) Formel Rennsport Club	25	(Switzerland) Gianni Bianchi	Dallara 389/010	Volkswagen	1–2, 5–6
(Switzerland) Wittwer Racing	27	(Switzerland) Rolf Kuhn	Reynard 893/052	Volkswagen	1
(Switzerland) Rene Wartmann	28	(Switzerland) Rene Wartmann	Dallara 389/010	Volkswagen	10–12
Class B
(West Germany) Rex Autopflege Nachwuchsteam	50	(West Germany) Thorsten Walz	Reynard 883/016	Volkswagen	1–3
(West Germany) Rex Autopflege Nachwuchsteam	50	(West Germany) Franz Engstler	Reynard 883/016	Volkswagen	6–12
(West Germany) Frank Beyerlein	51	(West Germany) Frank Beyerlein	Reynard 883/001	Volkswagen	1–3, 5–12
(Switzerland) Squadra Foitek	52	(Switzerland) Jacques Isler	Dallara 388/002	Volkswagen	1–2, 6
(Switzerland) Ski Zell Sport Team	53	(Austria) Franz Binder	Reynard 883/005	Volkswagen	1, 3–6, 8, 10–12
(West Germany) Mönninghoff Sympathik Racing	54	(West Germany) Franz Engstler	Reynard 883/017	Volkswagen	1–5
(West Germany) Mönninghoff Sympathik Racing	54	(West Germany) Klaus Panchyrz	Reynard 883/017	Volkswagen	6–8, 10
(West Germany) Mönninghoff Sympathik Racing	54	(Switzerland) Peter Schär	Reynard 883/017	Volkswagen	9
(West Germany) Cosy Informatik Systeme	55	(Switzerland) Peter Schär	Martini MK55/03	Volkswagen	1–8, 10–11
(West Germany) Cosy Informatik Systeme	55	(West Germany) Michael Krumm	Martini MK55/03	Volkswagen	12
(West Germany) Vienna Racing Team	59	(Denmark) Tom Kristensen	Reynard 883/052	Volkswagen	4–6
(West Germany) MSC Scuderia Mitwitz	60	(West Germany) Justin Sünkel	Dallara 387/014	Volkswagen	All
(West Germany) Richard Hamann	61	(West Germany) Richard Hamann	Reynard 873/051	Volkswagen	1, 6
(Switzerland) Rechsteiner Racing SA	63	(Switzerland) David Luyet	Dallara 388/001	Volkswagen	3, 6, 8
(Denmark) Svend Hansen	65	(Denmark) Svend Hansen	Reynard 883/040	Volkswagen	2
(West Germany) Thomas Gellermann	66	(West Germany) Thomas Gellermann	Reynard 863/039	Volkswagen	1
(Austria) Walter Lechner Racing School	69	(Austria) Mercedes Stermitz	Dallara 388/031	Volkswagen	6
(Austria) Walter Perfler	70	(Austria) Walter Perfler	Ralt RT31/701	Volkswagen	5
(West Germany) Team Hödlmoser	71	(West Germany) Mario Moser	Dallara 388/042	Toyota	5
(Austria) MSC Aschau	75	(Austria) Josef Neuhauser	Reynard 873/045	Volkswagen	5
(West Germany) Joachim Ryschka	77	(West Germany) Joachim Ryschka	Ralt RT31/707	Volkswagen	10–12
(West Germany) Volkmar Löw	78	(West Germany) Volkmar Löw	Ralt RT30/530	Volkswagen	11
(Czechoslovakia) MSC "12" München	79	(Czechoslovakia) Jaroslav Vorel	KDV 4/01	Volkswagen	11–12
(West Germany) Johann Stelzer	80	(West Germany) Johann Stelzer	Reynard 883/004	Volkswagen	1
(West Germany) Team Theuermann	82	(Austria) Wolfgang Petutschnig	Ralt RT30/563	Volkswagen	5

== Calendar ==
Round	Location	Circuit	Date	Supporting
1	Hockenheim, West Germany	Hockenheimring	16 April	AvD/MAC Rennsport-Festival
2	Nürburg, West Germany	Nürburgring	30 April	51. ADAC Eifelrennen
3	Berlin, West Germany	AVUS	28 May	ADAC-Avus-Rennen
4	Brno, Czechoslovakia	Masaryk Circuit	11 June	Grand Prix Brno
5	Zeltweg, Austria	Österreichring	18 June	Preis des Aichfeldes
6	Hockenheim, West Germany	Hockenheimring	2 July	ADAC-Preis Hockenheim
7	Wunstorf, West Germany	Wunstorf	9 July	22. ADAC-Flugplatzrennen Wunstorf
8	Hockenheim, West Germany	Hockenheimring	29 July	German Grand Prix
9	Diepholz, West Germany	Diepholz Airfield Circuit	6 August	22. ADAC-Flugplatzrennen Diepholz
10	Nürburg, West Germany	Nürburgring	3 September	ADAC Großer Preis der Tourenwagen
11	Nürburg, West Germany	Nürburgring	24 September	XVI. ADAC Bilstein Super Sprint
12	Hockenheim, West Germany	Hockenheimring	30 September	DMV-Preis von Hockenheim

== Results ==
Round	Circuit	Pole position	Fastest lap	Winning driver	Winning team	B Class Winner
1	(West Germany) Hockenheimring	(West Germany) Michael Bartels	(West Germany) Michael Bartels	(West Germany) Frank Krämer	(West Germany) Volkswagen Motorsport	(West Germany) Frank Beyerlein
2	(West Germany) Nürburgring	(West Germany) Michael Bartels	(West Germany) Michael Bartels	(West Germany) Michael Bartels	(West Germany) Bongers Motorsport	(West Germany) Frank Beyerlein
3	(West Germany) AVUS	(West Germany) Frank Schmickler	(West Germany) Frank Krämer	(Austria) Karl Wendlinger	(Austria) Krafft Walzen Team Marko RSM	(Austria) Franz Binder
4	(Czechoslovakia) Masaryk Circuit	(West Germany) Michael Bartels	(West Germany) Frank Biela	(West Germany) Michael Bartels	(West Germany) Bongers Motorsport	(West Germany) Franz Engstler
5	(Austria) Österreichring	(West Germany) Michael Schumacher	(Austria) Karl Wendlinger	(West Germany) Michael Schumacher	(West Germany) ONS Nachwuchsteam — WTS Racing	(West Germany) Franz Engstler
6	(West Germany) Hockenheimring	(Austria) Karl Wendlinger	(Austria) Karl Wendlinger	(West Germany) Heinz-Harald Frentzen	(West Germany) Team JSK Baumanagement	(Switzerland) Jacques Isler
7	(West Germany) Wunstorf	(West Germany) Wolfgang Kaufmann	not recorded	(West Germany) Heinz-Harald Frentzen	(West Germany) Team JSK Baumanagement	(West Germany) Franz Engstler
8	(West Germany) Hockenheimring	(West Germany) Heinz-Harald Frentzen	(West Germany) Heinz-Harald Frentzen	(Austria) Karl Wendlinger	(Austria) Krafft Walzen Team Marko RSM	(West Germany) Franz Engstler
9	(West Germany) Diepholz Airfield Circuit	(West Germany) Heinz-Harald Frentzen	(West Germany) Michael Bartels	(West Germany) Heinz-Harald Frentzen	(West Germany) Team JSK Baumanagement	(Austria) Franz Binder
10	(West Germany) Nürburgring	(West Germany) Peter Zakowski	(West Germany) Peter Zakowski	(West Germany) Peter Zakowski	(West Germany) Peter Zakowski Racing	(West Germany) Klaus Panchyrz
11	(West Germany) Nürburgring	(West Germany) Michael Schumacher	(West Germany) Peter Zakowski	(West Germany) Michael Schumacher	(West Germany) ONS Nachwuchsteam — WTS Racing	(West Germany) Frank Beyerlein
12	(West Germany) Hockenheimring	(West Germany) Heinz-Harald Frentzen	(West Germany) Klaus Panchyrz	(West Germany) Michael Bartels	(West Germany) Bongers Motorsport	(West Germany) Franz Engstler

== Championship standings ==
=== A-Class ===
- Points are awarded as follows:

1	2	3	4	5	6	7	8	9	10	11	12	13	14	15	16	17	18
20	18	16	15	14	13	12	11	10	9	8	7	6	5	4	3	2	1

Pos	Driver	HOC1 (West Germany)	NÜR1 (West Germany)	AVU (West Germany)	BRN (Czechoslovakia)	ZEL (Austria)	HOC2 (West Germany)	WUN (West Germany)	HOC3 (West Germany)	DIE (West Germany)	NÜR2 (West Germany)	NÜR3 (West Germany)	HOC4 (West Germany)	Points
1	(Austria) Karl Wendlinger	DNS	4	1	4	4	**2**	4	1	3	2	7	14	164
2	(West Germany) Heinz-Harald Frentzen	11	6	5	9	2	1	1	**2**	**1**	7	Ret	**2**	163
3	(West Germany) Michael Schumacher	3	3	3	5	**1**	3	12	19	4	5	**1**	3	163
4	(West Germany) Michael Bartels	**20**	**1**	8	**1**	3	4	Ret	5	2	3	19	1	150
5	(West Germany) Wolfgang Kaufmann	9	5	2	12	11	7	**3**	3	DNS	4	2	8	138
6	(West Germany) Peter Zakowski	7	Ret	Ret	2	5	19	11	4	5	**1**	3	4	132
7	(West Germany) Ellen Lohr	2	9	Ret	10	13	20	5	10	7	9	5	9	112
8	(West Germany) Michael Roppes	5	12	16	6	8	8	2	17	8	Ret	8	10	108
9	(West Germany) Frank Krämer	1	7	4	Ret	19	Ret	DNS	10	8	8	4	18	95
10	(West Germany) Ralf Kelleners	6	10	Ret	Ret	14	10		6	Ret	6	6	20	75
11	(West Germany) Frank Schmickler	4	Ret	**17**	Ret	6	11	8	16	11	17	Ret	7	74
12	(West Germany) Franz Engstler	13	17	Ret	13	10	Ret	6	11	14	15	15	11	65
13	(West Germany) Frank Biela	10	Ret	6	3		6	Ret	Ret	6				64
14	(West Germany) Marc Hessel	DNS	16	11	21	12	14	13	9	8	10	Ret		58
15	(Switzerland) Daniel Müller	DNS	8	7	8	9	Ret	Ret	7					56
16	(West Germany) Klaus Panchyrz					7	Ret	9	Ret		12	9	6	52
17	(Switzerland) Peter Schär	18	14	12	17	28	16	Ret	12	12	13	13		44
18	(Netherlands) Gerrit van Kouwen				7		9	7	Ret		11			42
19	(West Germany) Frank Beyerlein	8	11	15		16	Ret	Ret	15	Ret	Ret	12	17	39
20	(Austria) Franz Binder	14		9	18	20	13		13		Ret	14	15	37
21	(West Germany) Justin Sünkel	19	19	14	19	24	18	10	14	13	16	Ret	16	32
22	(Argentina) Víctor Rosso	DNS	2	Ret	11	17	Ret		18					29
23	(West Germany) Marco Werner											10	5	23
24	(Switzerland) Jacques Isler	22	15				5							18
25	(West Germany) Georg Arbinger	15	13	18	16	25	Ret	Ret						14
26	(Switzerland) Hanspeter Kaufmann				14	21	12		Ret					12
27	(West Germany) Meik Wagner	21			20	22	17	Ret		Ret	Ret	18	12	10
28	(Switzerland) David Luyet			10			Ret		DNS					9
29	(West Germany) Thorsten Walz	16	Ret	13										9
30	(Switzerland) Rene Wartmann										Ret	11	Ret	8
31	(Denmark) Tom Kristensen				15	15	DNS							8
32	(Switzerland) Rolf Kuhn	12												7
33	(West Germany) Michael Krumm												13	6
34	(Denmark) Svend Hansen		Ret								14			5
35	(West Germany) Richard Hamann	Ret					15							4
36	(West Germany) Joachim Ryschka										18	16	Ret	4
37	(Switzerland) Gianni Bianchi	17	18			23	21							3
38	(Czechoslovakia) Jaroslav Vorel											17	19	2
	(Austria) Josef Neuhauser					18								0
	(Austria) Günter Aberer					26								0
	(West Germany) Mario Moser					27								0
	(Austria) Wolfgang Petutschnig					29								0
	(Austria) Walter Perfler					Ret								0
	(West Germany) Thomas Gellermann	DNS												0
	(Austria) Mercedes Stermitz						Ret							0
	(West Germany) Johann Stelzer					DNS								0
	(Switzerland) Flurin Zegg						DNS							0
	(West Germany) Volkmar Löw											DNQ		0
Pos	Driver	HOC1 (West Germany)	NÜR1 (West Germany)	AVU (West Germany)	BRN (Czechoslovakia)	ZEL (Austria)	HOC2 (West Germany)	WUN (West Germany)	HOC3 (West Germany)	DIE (West Germany)	NÜR2 (West Germany)	NÜR3 (West Germany)	HOC4 (West Germany)	Points

Colour	Result
Gold	Winner
Silver	Second place
Bronze	Third place
Green	Points classification
Blue	Non-points classification
Blue	Non-classified finish (NC)
Purple	Retired, not classified (Ret)
Red	Did not qualify (DNQ)
Red	Did not pre-qualify (DNPQ)
Black	Disqualified (DSQ)
White	Did not start (DNS)
White	Withdrew (WD)
White	Race cancelled (C)
Blank	Did not practice (DNP)
Blank	Did not arrive (DNA)
Blank	Excluded (EX)

**Bold** – Pole
Italics – Fastest Lap
