= Diepholz Airfield Circuit =

Former auto racing circuit in Germany

- Full Circuit (1992–1996)
- Location: Diepholz, Germany
- Coordinates: 52°35′08″N 8°20′28″E
- Opened: 21 July 1968; 57 years ago
- Closed: 23 August 1998; 27 years ago
- Major events: Formula König (1997–1998); Formula Renault 2.0 Germany (1997–1998); Porsche Carrera Cup Germany (1990, 1992–1998); DTM (1985, 1987, 1989–1996); Supercup (1987–1989); German F3 (1971, 1977–1983, 1985, 1989–1996); Deutsche Rennsport Meisterschaft (1972–1977, 1979–1980, 1983–1984)

Full Circuit (1992–1996)
- Length: 2.720 km (1.690 mi)
- Turns: 12
- Race lap record: 0:57.735 ( (Austria) Alexander Wurz, Opel Calibra V6 4x4, 1996, Class 1)

Full Circuit (1991)
- Length: 2.690 km (1.671 mi)
- Turns: 9
- Race lap record: 0:56.070 ( (Germany) Marco Werner, Ralt RT35, 1991, F3)

Full Circuit (1989–1990)
- Length: 2.690 km (1.671 mi)
- Turns: 10
- Race lap record: 0:51.760 ( (United Kingdom) Martin Donnelly, Nissan R89C, 1989, Group C)

Full Circuit (1977–1988)
- Length: 2.600 km (1.616 mi)
- Turns: 14
- Race lap record: 0:48.150 ( (West Germany) Hans-Joachim Stuck, Porsche 962C, 1987, Group C)

Full Circuit (1968–1976)
- Length: 2.600 km (1.616 mi)
- Turns: 10
- Race lap record: 0:56.590 ( (West Germany) Hans-Joachim Stuck, BMW 3.0 CSL, 1973, Group 2)

The Diepholz Airfield Circuit was an auto racing circuit in the south-west of Diepholz, Germany. It was a temporary circuit on the Diepholz Air Base, a base which is still in use by the German Air Force today.

The full length of the runway was used as part of the circuit, with a fast double chicane and a straight start/finish, which included a temporary pit lane going down one side of the runway. There were no pit garages or permanent racing-related buildings on site.

Racing occurred at Diepholz in 1968 due to a lack of permanent circuits in Germany. Used mainly for touring car racing, Diepholz was a regular venue on the calendar for the DTM series. When the DTM, then known as the FIA International Touring Car Championship, collapsed at the end of 1996, the circuit had little use. In 1997 and 1998, the circuit hosted races for Formula König, Formula Renault 2.0 Germany, and Porsche Carrera Cup Germany. Since then, the circuit has not hosted any races.

== Lap records ==
The fastest official race lap records at the Diepholz Airfield Circuit are listed as:

Category	Time	Driver	Vehicle	Event
Full Circuit (1992–1996): 2.720 km (1.690 mi)
Class 1 Touring Cars	0:57.735	Alexander Wurz	Opel Calibra V6 4x4	1996 Diepholz ITC round
Formula Three	0:58.333	Emmanuel Clérico	Dallara 395	1996 Diepholz German F3 round
Full Circuit (1991): 2.690 km (1.671 mi)
Formula Three	0:56.070	Marco Werner	Ralt RT35	1991 Diepholz German F3 round
Group A	0:59.600	Klaus Ludwig	Mercedes 190E 2.5-16 Evo2	1991 Diepholz DTM round
Full Circuit (1989–1990): 2.690 km (1.671 mi)
Group C	0:51.760	Martin Donnelly	Nissan R89C	1989 Diepholz Supercup round
Formula Three	0:55.070	Michael Bartels	Reynard 893	1989 Diepholz German F3 round
Group C2	0:55.420	Philippe de Henning	Spice SE87C	1989 Diepholz Supercup round
Group A	1:01.600	Gianfranco Brancatelli	Ford Sierra RS500 Cosworth	1989 Diepholz DTM round
Full Circuit (1977–1988): 2.600 km (1.616 mi)
Group C	0:48.150	Hans-Joachim Stuck	Porsche 962C	1987 Diepholz Supercup round
Group 5	0:53.080	Manfred Winkelhock	Porsche 935J	1980 Diepholz DRM round
Formula Three	0:53.800	Volker Weidler	Martini MK45	1985 Diepholz German F3 round
Group B	0:56.870	Harald Grohs	BMW M1	1983 Diepholz Rennsport Trophäe round
Group A	0:59.190	Manuel Reuter	Ford Sierra RS500 Cosworth	1987 Diepholz DTM round
Group 4	1:02.700	Hans Heyer	Ford Escort RS	1977 Diepholz DRM round
Full Circuit (1967–1976): 2.600 km (1.616 mi)
Group 2	0:56.590	Hans-Joachim Stuck	BMW 3.0 CSL	1973 Diepholz DRM round
Group 4	0:58.800	Toine Hezemans	Porsche 934	1976 Diepholz DRM round
Formula Three	1:02.000	Carlo Breidenstein	Brabham BT21	1971 Diepholz German F3 round
