= German Formula Three Championship =

Defunct single-seater motor racing championship

- Category: Single-seaters
- Country: Germany
- Inaugural season: 1950
- Folded: 2014
- Drivers: 45
- Teams: 22
- Constructors: 4
- Engine suppliers: 5
- Tyre suppliers: Yokohama
- Last Drivers' champion: (Germany) Markus Pommer
- Last Teams' champion: (Germany) Lotus
- Official website: Formel3.de

The German Formula Three Championship was the national Formula Three championship of Germany, and the former West Germany, from 1950 to 2002, then as Formel 3 until 2014. In 2003, the series merged with the French Formula Three Championship to form the Formula 3 Euro Series. The lower-level series, the ATS Formel 3 Cup, subsequently operated in Germany, but it folded after the end of the 2014 season. Since the late 1980s, the list of German F3 champions has included many notable drivers, including Formula One World Champion Michael Schumacher and nine-time Le Mans winner Tom Kristensen.

== History ==
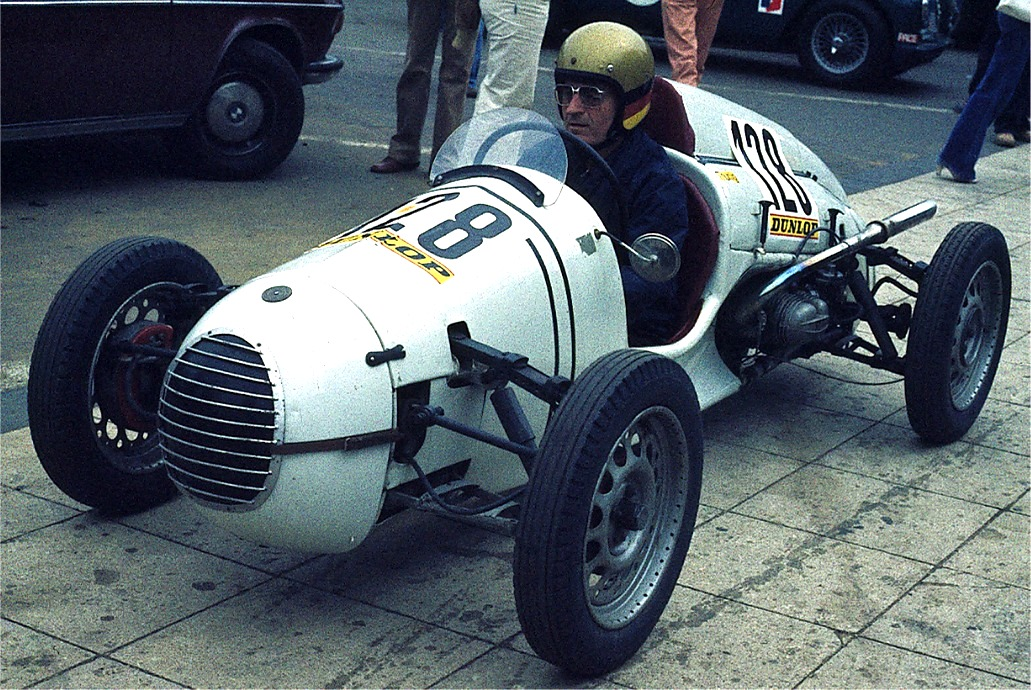
A BMW-engined 500cc Formula Three car, photographed in 1978.

=== 1950–1956 ===
The first few years of Formula Three in Germany were inevitably subject to the effects of the country's post-war geo-political situation, which resulted in the existence of two separate championships. The West German championship ran from 1950 to 1954, while the East German equivalent continued until 1956. During this period, both championships used the then-standard 500cc two-stroke formula. This era was notable for BMW's first foray into open-wheeled racing as an engine supplier, having enjoyed success in pre-war motorcycle racing and touring cars.

=== 1960–1963 ===
The 500cc Formula 3 specification was superseded in 1958 by Formula Junior, with engine capacities of 1000cc (360kg chassis) or 1100cc (400kg chassis) that were derived from production cars, rather than motorcycles. This new specification was adopted in a revived German F3 Championship in 1960, which was won by Gerhard Mitter. The 1961 title was won by Kurt Ahrens Jr., who became champion again in 1963. He was effectively a back-to-back winner, because there was no championship in 1962.

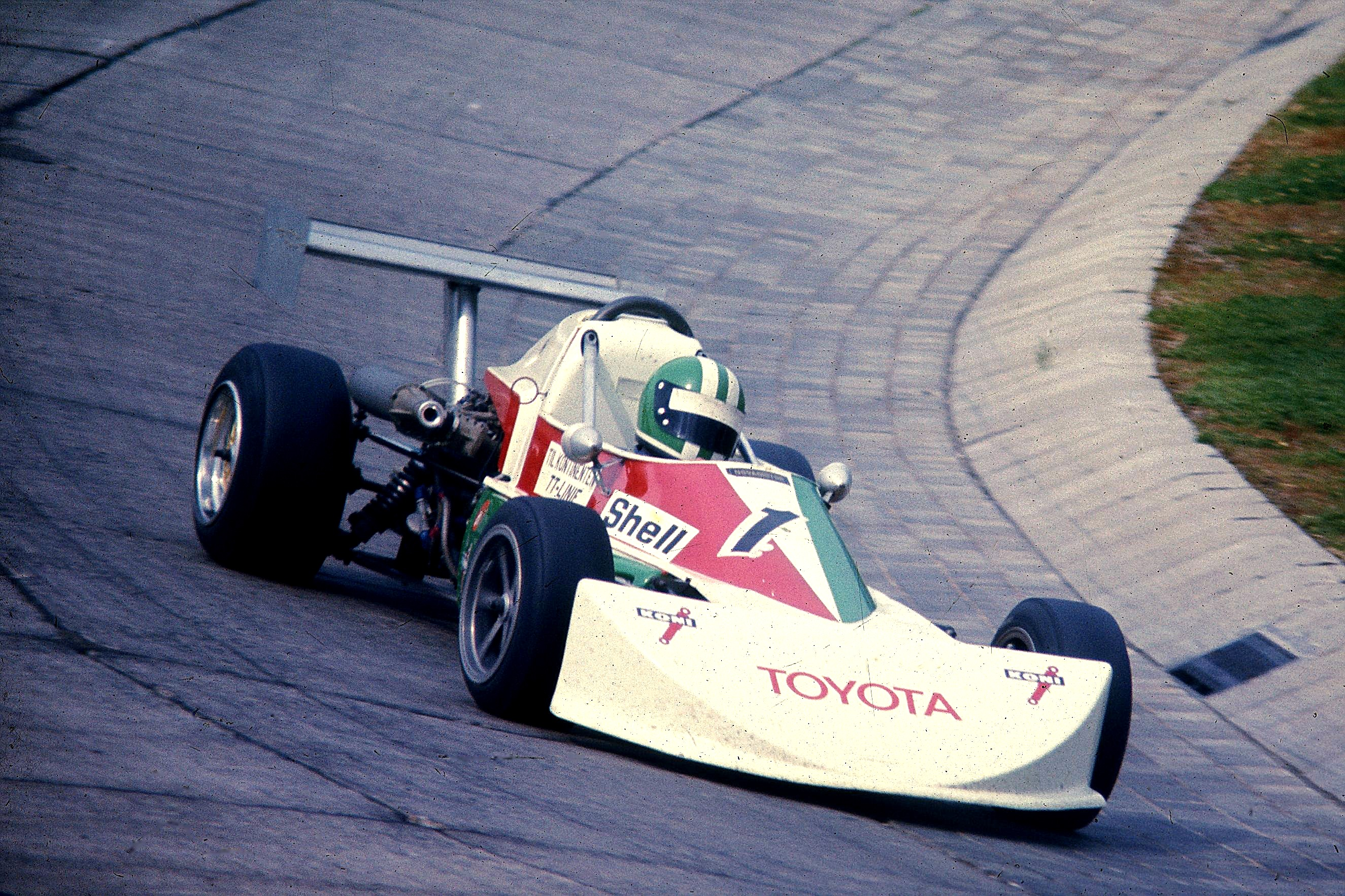
A March-Toyota driven by Rudolf Dötsch in a German F3 event, 1976.

=== 1975–2002 ===
In 1964, the Fédération Internationale de l'Automobile (FIA) ended Formula Junior and returned to Formula Three, but this time with 1000cc four-cylinder production-based engines. However, it would be ten years before Formula Three was revived in Germany. The first German F3 champion of this era was Ernst Maring, who won the title in 1975. He was also the first non-German driver to win the title. Other notable drivers of this era were two-time champions Bertram Schäfer (1976 and 1978) and Frank Jelinski (1980–81). Schäfer drove for his eponymous team, Bertram Schäfer Racing, which also won the championship with Jelinski. BSR became a stalwart of German F3, winning a total of eight drivers' titles. It still competes in the series today.

In the 1980s, the German F3 Championship began to produce some notable champions that would later graduate to Formula One and achieve title-winning success in other championships. Bernd Schneider (1987) and Joachim Winkelhock (1988) went on to make F1 appearances and became champions at the highest levels of touring car racing. 1985 champion Volker Weidler also competed in F1 and won the 24 Hours of Le Mans in 1991.

However, the 1990 champion was arguably the most notable of them all: Michael Schumacher. Four years before winning the first of his seven F1 World Championship titles, Schumacher had already attracted attention with his performances in F3 and the World Sportscar Championship at a time when the profile of German F3 was rising, and within a year, he had already made his Grand Prix début. Heinz-Harald Frentzen competed against Schumacher (sharing the runner-up position in 1989), and later became a winner of three Grands Prix.

Schumacher's championship successor, Tom Kristensen from Denmark, embarked on a sportscar career that peaked with a record number of nine Le Mans wins. He has since established himself in the DTM touring car series.

During the 1990s, two more future Grand Prix winners graduated from the German F3 Championship – Ralf Schumacher and Jarno Trulli – together with many other notable drivers that include Alexander Wurz, Jos Verstappen, Norberto Fontana, Nick Heidfeld and Christijan Albers. The last champion of this period, Gary Paffett, went on to win the DTM drivers' championship title and worked as a test driver for McLaren-Mercedes. In 2007, he returned to racing in the DTM.

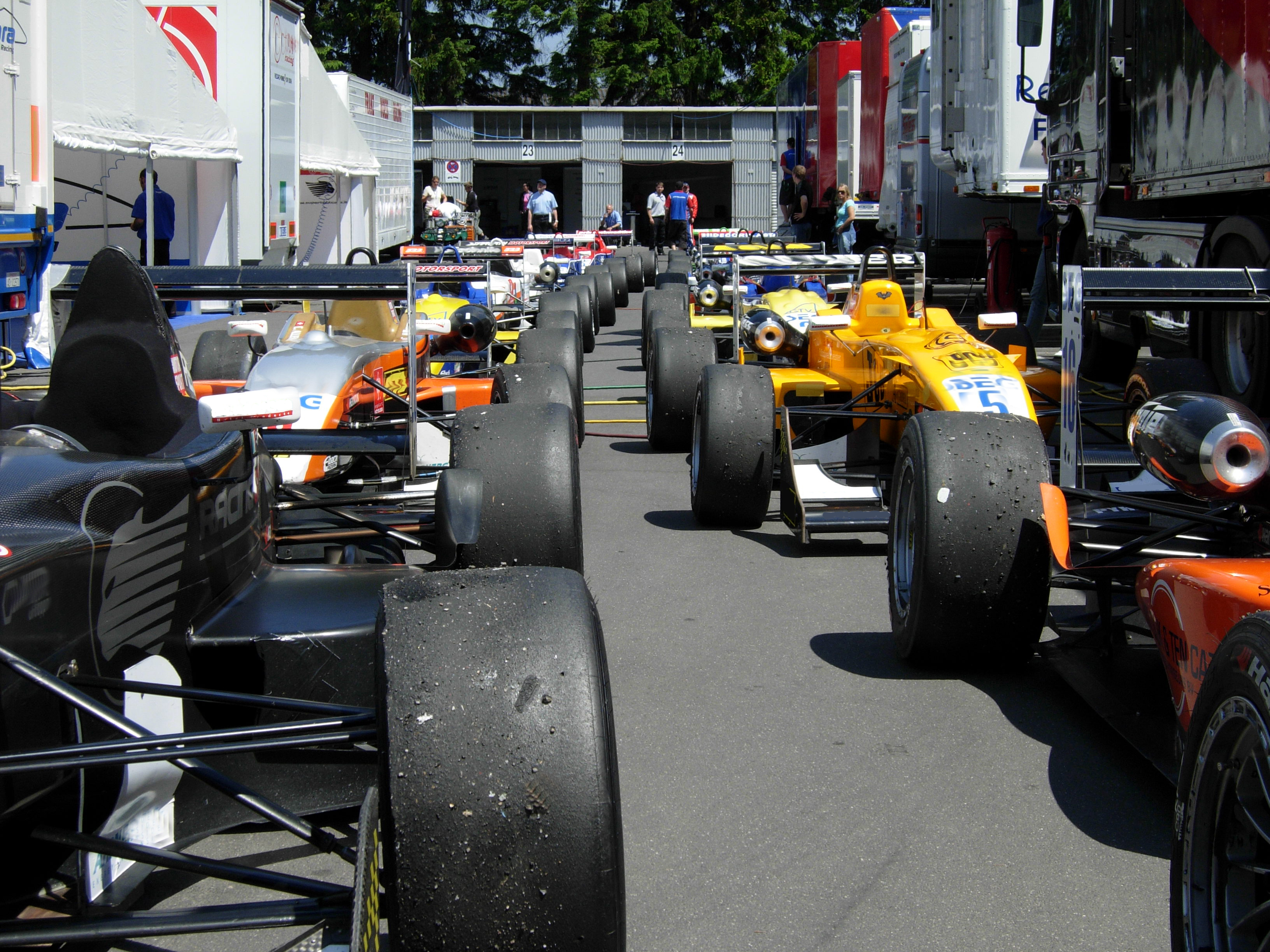
Formel 3 Cup cars in parc fermé at the Nürburgring, 2006.

=== 2003 onwards ===
In 2002, the motorsport governing bodies of France and Germany collaborated to revive the concept of a European F3 championship. The F3 Euroseries was supposed to replace the German and French national championships – indeed, the French championship came to an end at that point. However, the German championship had more entrants, many of whom had concerns about the inevitable cost increase that a pan-European event calendar would entail. Bertram Schäfer led moves to maintain some form of national F3 series in Germany, and had support from ADAC and the F3V (Germany's national F3 association). In 2003, the new series was inaugurated, with Schäfer himself functioning as the series promoter. The Recaro Formel 3 Cup had title sponsorship from Recaro, a racing parts company based in Germany. It was replaced in 2007 by wheel manufacturer ATS.

In 2005, a two-tier championship class system was adopted for chassis specifications from the previous three-year lifecycle. This system was adopted by the British F3 Championship in the 1990s and has since gained favour in many other F3 championships throughout Europe. It can provide an important entry point for drivers and teams without a competitive budget.

After a 2014 season in which grid numbers ranged between nine and 14 cars, the series' organisers rejected a proposed merger with the British Formula 3 Championship with the intention of continuing the F3 Cup in 2015 under the name German Formula Open in order to circumvent FIA rules on national F3 championships which stipulate that they can hold no more than one round outside their home country (the organisers were planning to hold races at three meetings abroad as part of the support package for the ADAC GT Masters championship). However, in January 2015 it was announced that the series would not be held in 2015, although it was hoped that it could be revived in the near future.

== Chassis and engines ==
Despite the fact that F3 is still an open formula for which any chassis builder or engine tuner can supply a product provided that it meets the technical regulations, most championships have just one de facto choice of chassis supplier – usually Dallara – and two or three popular engine suppliers – usually Mugen-Honda, Mercedes-Benz, Spiess-Opel, or TOM's-Toyota.

The Formel 3 Cup has bucked this trend to become one of the most eclectic F3 championships in the world, with some of the variety that F3 enjoyed in the 1970s. In addition to the ubiquitous Dallaras, the Lola B06/30 and the SLC R1 from Signature have established a foothold. The SLC, which was the Signature team's first foray into chassis construction, had previously competed in the F3 Euroseries in 2005, but Signature chose not to continue using it. The Lola, which was developed after the British company's collaboration with Dome came to an end, has otherwise had only limited use in British F3 during 2006. Swiss Racing Team had provisionally lodged two entries for a pair of Mygale M06/F3 chassis in addition to a single Dallara entry. Before the start of the season, however, it had changed its line-up to four Dallaras, one of which was later replaced during the season with an SLC R1.

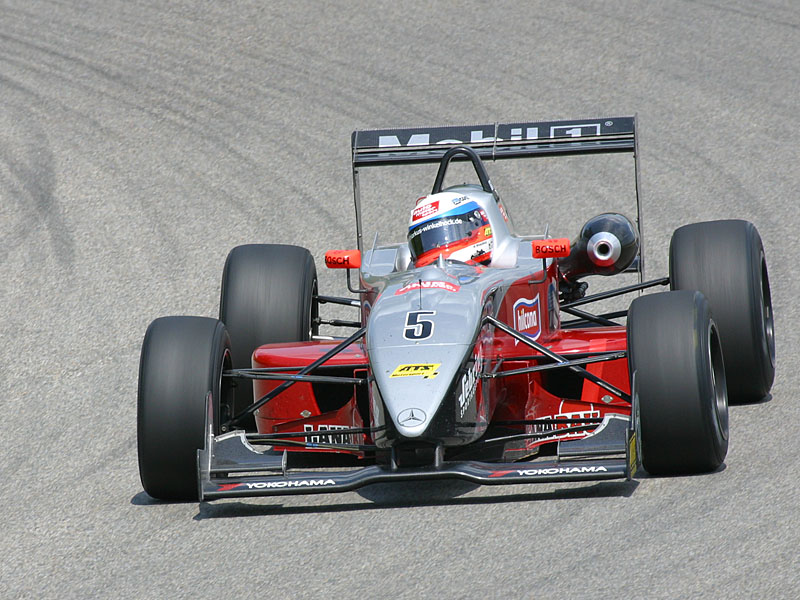
Markus Winkelhock driving a Dallara-Mercedes at the Sachsenring

During the 2006 season, a fourth chassis joined the series on an experimental basis. The Ligier JS47, which was built by Martini after Guy Ligier acquired the company in 2005, was used in selected rounds by Nico Hülkenberg, driving for Josef Kaufmann Racing.

The engine supply market in the Formel 3 Cup is just as open. The H.W.A.-Mercedes and Spiess-Opel are the most popular, but some teams use the Mugen-Honda, TOM's-Toyota and even the older Sodemo-Renault. This is in stark contrast to the Euroseries, in which Mercedes powered all bar five of the 2006 entrants. However, the 2007 Formel 3 Cup season is likely to see a different pattern emerge, with the introduction of a new "Challenge" engine, which is expected to be chosen by a number of teams in both the Championship class and the Trophy class. It is being built by Spiess and is based on the company's Opel engine, but with some technical changes to lengthen the service interval and reduce running costs.

=== Specifications ===
- Engine: piston engines, maximum four cylinders, 26mm-diameter air restrictor
- Capacity: maximum 2,000cc
- Tyres: Yokohama, dimensions: 200/50VR13 front, 240/45VR13 rear
- Tyre limitation: 2 sets of slicks per weekend, unlimited number of wet-weather tyres
- Restriction: thermal, chemical or mechanical treatments are prohibited
- Wheels:ATS alloy wheel front 9x13, rear 10.5x13
- Minimum weight: 550 kg, car including all fluids and the driver
- Fuel: Control fuel, unleaded Shell Super plus
- Restriction: no refuelling during practice, qualifying and race
- Monocoque: Carbon fibre sandwich design, two roll-over structures, stepped underbody
- Restriction: Monocoque must not be changed during an event
- Telemetry: Prohibited
- Data recording: Allowed
- ABS: Prohibited
- Gearbox: Maximum 6-speed gearbox, sequential
- Catalyst: Silencer and catalyst

== See also ==
- German Formula Three Championship drivers
- ADAC Formel Masters
- Formula 3 Euro Series
