= 1993 German Formula Three Championship =

Seasons
- ← 1992 1994 →

The 1993 German Formula Three Championship (German: 1993 Deutsche Formel-3-Meisterschaft) was a multi-event motor racing championship for single-seat open wheel formula racing cars that held in Germany and in Belgium. The championship featured drivers competing in two-litre Formula Three racing cars majorly built by Dallara which conform to the technical regulations, or formula, for the championship. It commenced on 3 April at Zolder and ended at Hockenheim on 19 September after ten double-header rounds.

Opel Team WTS driver Jos Verstappen became the first Dutch champion. He won eight races and collected another six podium finishes. Massimiliano Angelelli finished as runner-up with win at Diepholz Airfield Circuit, losing 41 points to Verstappen. Sascha Maassen won at Hockenheimring, Nürburgring and Alemannenring. Michael Krumm and Roberto Colciago completed the top-five in the drivers' championship. Markus Liesner and Jörg Müller were the other race winners. Patrick Bernhardt clinched the B-Cup championship title.

== Teams and drivers ==
Entry List
| Team | No. | Driver | Chassis | Engine | Rounds |
Class A
| (Germany) Opel Team WTS | 1 | (Netherlands) Jos Verstappen | Dallara 393/034 | Opel | All |
| (Germany) Opel Team WTS | 2 | (Germany) Claudia Hürtgen | Dallara 393/040 | Opel | 1-4, 6-8 |
| (Germany) Opel Team WTS | 2 | (Germany) Marco Werner | Dallara 393/040 | Opel | 5 |
| (Germany) Opel Team WTS | 2 | (Germany) Sandy Grau | Dallara 393/040 | Opel | 9-10 |
| (Germany) G+M Escom Motorsport | 3 | (Germany) Michael Krumm | Dallara 393/036 | Opel | All |
| (Germany) G+M Escom Motorsport | 4 | (Germany) Michael Graf | Dallara 393/035 | Opel | All |
| (Germany) Volkswagen Motorsport | 5 | (Germany) Sascha Maassen | Dallara 393/033 | Volkswagen | All |
| (Germany) Volkswagen Motorsport | 6 | (Italy) Massimiliano Angelelli | Dallara 393/018 | Volkswagen | All |
| (Switzerland) Jacques Isler Racing | 7 | (Germany) Dino Lamby | Dallara 393/039 | Fiat | 1-8 |
| (Switzerland) Jacques Isler Racing | 7 | (Austria) Patrick Vallant | Dallara 393/039 | Fiat | 9 |
| (Switzerland) Jacques Isler Racing | 8 | (Austria) Philipp Peter | Dallara 393/021 | Fiat | All |
| (Germany) Abt Motorsport - ADAC F3 Junior Team | 12 | (Germany) Christian Abt | Dallara 393/020 | Opel | All |
| (Austria) Vienna Racing | 14 | (Netherlands) Peter Kox | Eufra 393/01 | Mugen-Honda | 1-2 |
| (Austria) Vienna Racing | 15 | (Finland) Marko Mankonen | Eufra 393/01 | Mugen-Honda | 3-4 |
| (Austria) Vienna Racing | 15 | (Germany) Frank Krämer | Eufra 393/01 | Mugen-Honda | 5 |
| (Switzerland) KMS | 16 | (Switzerland) Gian-Maria Regazzoni | Dallara 393/065 | Opel | 4-10 |
| (Switzerland) KMS | 17 | (United States) Markus Liesner | Dallara 393/003 | Opel | All |
| (Switzerland) KMS | 18 | (Switzerland) Ruedi Schurter | Dallara 393/048 | Opel | 5, 10 |
| (Germany) Elf Team Formel 3 | 19 | (Germany) Danny Pfeil | Reynard 933/015 | Opel | 1 |
| (Germany) Elf Team Formel 3 | 19 | (Germany) Thomas Wöhrle | Reynard 933/015 | Opel | 2-5, 7-10 |
| (Germany) Elf Team Formel 3 | 20 | (Germany) Marco Werner | Dallara 393/067 | Opel | 6-10 |
| (Germany) Danny Pfeil | 20 | (Germany) Danny Pfeil | Reynard 923/014 | Opel | 2 |
| (Austria) Marko RSM | 33 | (Germany) Jörg Müller | Dallara 393/068 | Fiat | 5-7, 9-10 |
| (Austria) Marko RSM | 37 | (Austria) Alexander Wurz | Dallara 393/031 | Fiat | 1-7, 9-10 |
| (Italy) RC Motorsport | 38 | (Italy) Roberto Colciago | Dallara 393/009 | Opel | 2-10 |
| (Italy) RC Motorsport | 39 | (Italy) Michele Gasparini | Dallara 393/038 | Opel | 2 |
| (Italy) RC Motorsport | 39 | (Germany) Danny Pfeil | Dallara 393/038 | Opel | 3-10 |
| (United Kingdom) Richard Arnold Developments | 41 | (United Kingdom) Warren Hughes | Dallara 393/061 | Fiat | 10 |
| (United Kingdom) Richard Arnold Developments | 42 | (United Kingdom) Steven Arnold | Dallara 393/043 | Mugen-Honda | 10 |
Class B
| (Germany) G+M Escom Motorsport | 50 | (Germany) Frank Kremer | Ralt RT36/962 | Opel | All |
| (Germany) G+M Escom Motorsport | 51 | (Germany) Hans Fertl | Ralt RT36/980 | Opel | All |
| (Germany) Abt Motorsport - ADAC F3 Junior Team | 52 | (Germany) Anreas Schüssler | Ralt RT35/892 | Volkswagen | 1-5 |
| (Czech Republic) Indet Racing | 53 | (Czech Republic) Tomáš Karhánek | Reynard 923/005 | Opel | All |
| (Switzerland) KMS | 55 | (Switzerland) Christian Fischer | Dallara 392/036 | Opel | 1-3, 8, 10 |
| (Germany) Detlef Schoch | 56 | (Germany) Detlef Schoch | Ralt RT30/529 | Volkswagen | 1-3, 5-7 |
| (Austria) Franz Binder | 57 | (Austria) Franz Binder | Reynard 923/014 | Opel | 1, 3, 5, 7, 10 |
| (Austria) Andreas Reiter | 57 | (Austria) Anreas Reiter | Reynard 923/014 | Opel | 9 |
| (Austria) Günter Aberer | 58 | (Austria) Günter Aberer | Reynard 923/011 | Alfa Romeo | 1-2, 4 |
| (Austria) Günter Aberer | 58 | (Austria) Claudia Kreuzsaler | Reynard 923/011 | Alfa Romeo | 7 |
| (Austria) Günter Aberer | 58 | (Austria) Hans Egger-Richter | Reynard 923/011 | Alfa Romeo | 9-10 |
| (Germany) Thomas Wagner | 59 | (Germany) Thomas Wagner | Reynard 903/038 | Volkswagen | 1-2 |
| (Austria) Franz Wöss Racing | 60 | (Germany) André Fibier | Ralt RT36/956 | Volkswagen | All |
| (Austria) Franz Wöss Racing | 61 | (Austria) Georg Holzer | Ralt RT35/884 | Volkswagen | 1, 4, 7 |
| (Austria) Franz Wöss Racing | 61 | (Austria) Franz Wöss | Ralt RT35/884 | Volkswagen | 3, 5-6, 8, 10 |
| (Germany) Arnold Wagner | 63 | (Germany) Arnold Wagner | Reynard 913/016 | Volkswagen | 1-2 |
| (Germany) Volkswagen Motorsport | 66 | (Germany) Patrick Bernhardt | Ralt RT36/950 | Volkswagen | All |
| (Switzerland) Roger Studhalter | 68 | (Switzerland) Roger Studhalter | Dallara 391/038 | Volkswagen | 10 |
| (Switzerland) Formel Vau Club Schweiz | 69 | (Switzerland) Rudolf Meyer | Dallara 389/007 | Alfa Romeo | 10 |

== Calendar ==
With the exception of round at Zolder in Belgium, all rounds took place on German soil.

| Round | | Location | Circuit | Date | Supporting |
|---|---|---|---|---|---|
| 1 | R1 | Heusden-Zolder, Belgium | Circuit Zolder | 3 April | AvD/MVBL Bergischer Löwe |
| 1 | R2 | Heusden-Zolder, Belgium | Circuit Zolder | 4 April | AvD/MVBL Bergischer Löwe |
| 2 | R1 | Hockenheim, Germany | Hockenheimring | 17 April | AvD/MAC-Rennsportfestival |
| 2 | R2 | Hockenheim, Germany | Hockenheimring | 18 April | AvD/MAC-Rennsportfestival |
| 3 | R1 | Nürburg, Germany | Nürburgring | 1 May | 55. ADAC Eifelrennen |
| 3 | R2 | Nürburg, Germany | Nürburgring | 2 May | 55. ADAC Eifelrennen |
| 4 | R1 | Wunstorf, Germany | Wunstorf | 15 May | ADAC Flugplatzrennen Wunstorf |
| 4 | R2 | Wunstorf, Germany | Wunstorf | 16 May | ADAC Flugplatzrennen Wunstorf |
| 5 | R1 | Nuremberg, Germany | Norisring | 26 June | ADAC-Norisring-Trophäe "200 Meilen von Nürnberg" |
| 5 | R2 | Nuremberg, Germany | Norisring | 27 June | ADAC-Norisring-Trophäe "200 Meilen von Nürnberg" |
| 6 | R1 | Diepholz, Germany | Diepholz Airfield Circuit | 7 August | 26. ADAC-Flugplatzrennen Diepholz |
| 6 | R2 | Diepholz, Germany | Diepholz Airfield Circuit | 8 August | 26. ADAC-Flugplatzrennen Diepholz |
| 7 | R1 | Nürburg, Germany | Nürburgring | 21 August | ADAC-Formel Festival |
| 7 | R2 | Nürburg, Germany | Nürburgring | 22 August | ADAC-Formel Festival |
| 8 | R1 | Singen, Germany | Alemannenring | 28 August | 3. ADAC-Preis Singen |
| 8 | R2 | Singen, Germany | Alemannenring | 29 August | 3. ADAC-Preis Singen |
| 9 | R1 | Berlin, Germany | AVUS | 11 September | ADAC-Avus-Rennen |
| 9 | R2 | Berlin, Germany | AVUS | 12 September | ADAC-Avus-Rennen |
| 10 | R1 | Hockenheim, Germany | Hockenheimring | 18 September | DMV-Preis Hockenheim |
| 10 | R2 | Hockenheim, Germany | Hockenheimring | 19 September | DMV-Preis Hockenheim |

== Results ==
| Round | | Circuit | Pole position | Fastest lap | Winning driver | Winning team | B Class Winner |
|---|---|---|---|---|---|---|---|
| 1 | R1 | Circuit Zolder | (Germany) Michael Krumm | (Netherlands) Jos Verstappen | (Germany) Michael Krumm | (Germany) G+M Escom Motorsport | (Germany) André Fibier |
| 1 | R2 | Circuit Zolder | (Germany) Michael Krumm | (Austria) Philipp Peter | (Germany) Michael Krumm | (Germany) G+M Escom Motorsport | (Austria) Franz Binder |
| 2 | R1 | Hockenheimring | (Austria) Philipp Peter | (Germany) Michael Krumm | (United States) Markus Liesner | (Switzerland) KMS | (Germany) André Fibier |
| 2 | R2 | Hockenheimring | (United States) Markus Liesner | (Netherlands) Jos Verstappen | (Germany) Sascha Maassen | (Germany) Volkswagen Motorsport | (Germany) Thomas Winkelhock |
| 3 | R1 | Nürburgring | (Germany) Sascha Maassen | (Germany) Sascha Maassen | (Germany) Sascha Maassen | (Germany) Volkswagen Motorsport | (Germany) André Fibier |
| 3 | R2 | Nürburgring | (Germany) Sascha Maassen | (United States) Markus Liesner | (Germany) Michael Krumm | (Germany) G+M Escom Motorsport | (Germany) Patrick Bernhardt |
| 4 | R1 | Wunstorf | (Germany) Sascha Maassen | (Netherlands) Jos Verstappen | (Netherlands) Jos Verstappen | (Germany) Opel Team WTS | (Germany) André Fibier |
| 4 | R2 | Wunstorf | (Netherlands) Jos Verstappen | (Netherlands) Jos Verstappen | (Netherlands) Jos Verstappen | (Germany) Opel Team WTS | (Germany) Patrick Bernhardt |
| 5 | R1 | Norisring | (Netherlands) Jos Verstappen | (Netherlands) Jos Verstappen | (Netherlands) Jos Verstappen | (Germany) Opel Team WTS | (Germany) Patrick Bernhardt |
| 5 | R2 | Norisring | (Netherlands) Jos Verstappen | (Netherlands) Jos Verstappen | (Netherlands) Jos Verstappen | (Germany) Opel Team WTS | (Germany) Patrick Bernhardt |
| 6 | R1 | Diepholz Airfield Circuit | (Germany) Jörg Müller | (Germany) Jörg Müller | (Germany) Jörg Müller | (Austria) Marko RSM | (Germany) André Fibier |
| 6 | R2 | Diepholz Airfield Circuit | (Germany) Jörg Müller | (Germany) Sascha Maassen | (Italy) Massimiliano Angelelli | (Germany) Volkswagen Motorsport | (Germany) André Fibier |
| 7 | R1 | Nürburgring | (Netherlands) Jos Verstappen | (Netherlands) Jos Verstappen | (Germany) Michael Krumm | (Germany) G+M Escom Motorsport | (Germany) André Fibier |
| 7 | R2 | Nürburgring | (Germany) Michael Krumm | (Germany) Michael Krumm | (Netherlands) Jos Verstappen | (Germany) Opel Team WTS | (Germany) Patrick Bernhardt |
| 8 | R1 | Alemannenring | (Germany) Sascha Maassen | (Netherlands) Jos Verstappen | (Germany) Sascha Maassen | (Germany) Volkswagen Motorsport | (Germany) Patrick Bernhardt |
| 8 | R2 | Alemannenring | (Germany) Sascha Maassen | (Italy) Massimiliano Angelelli | (Netherlands) Jos Verstappen | (Germany) Opel Team WTS | (Germany) Patrick Bernhardt |
| 9 | R1 | AVUS | (Netherlands) Jos Verstappen | (Italy) Massimiliano Angelelli | (Netherlands) Jos Verstappen | (Germany) Opel Team WTS | (Germany) Patrick Bernhardt |
| 9 | R2 | AVUS | (Netherlands) Jos Verstappen | (Netherlands) Jos Verstappen | (Netherlands) Jos Verstappen | (Germany) Opel Team WTS | (Germany) Patrick Bernhardt |
| 10 | R1 | Hockenheimring | (Italy) Massimiliano Angelelli | (Netherlands) Jos Verstappen | (Italy) Roberto Colciago | (Italy) RC Motorsport | (Germany) André Fibier |
| 10 | R2 | Hockenheimring | (Italy) Roberto Colciago | (Germany) Sascha Maassen | (Germany) Sascha Maassen | (Germany) Volkswagen Motorsport | (Germany) Patrick Bernhardt |

== Championship standings ==
=== A-Class ===
- Points are awarded as follows:

| 1 | 2 | 3 | 4 | 5 | 6 | 7 | 8 | 9 | 10 |
|---|---|---|---|---|---|---|---|---|---|
| 20 | 15 | 12 | 10 | 8 | 6 | 4 | 3 | 2 | 1 |

| Pos | Driver | ZOL | | HOC1 | | NÜR1 | | WUN | | NOR | | DIE | | NÜR2 | | SIN | | AVU | | HOC2 | | Points |
|---|---|---|---|---|---|---|---|---|---|---|---|---|---|---|---|---|---|---|---|---|---|---|
| 1 | (Netherlands) Jos Verstappen | 3 | Ret | 5 | 4 | 2 | 2 | 1 | **1** | **1** | **1** | 2 | Ret | **2** | 1 | 2 | 1 | **1** | **1** | 7 | 11 | 269 |
| 2 | (Italy) Massimiliano Angelelli | 2 | 2 | 4 | 10 | 4 | 4 | 3 | 3 | 5 | 6 | 3 | 1 | 4 | 3 | 5 | 3 | 2 | 4 | **2** | 2 | 228 |
| 3 | (Germany) Sascha Maassen | 5 | 4 | 2 | 1 | **1** | **3** | **2** | 4 | 4 | 4 | Ret | 5 | 5 | Ret | **1** | **2** | 4 | 5 | 6 | 1 | 225 |
| 4 | (Germany) Michael Krumm | **1** | **1** | Ret | 8 | 3 | 1 | 8 | Ret | 7 | 3 | 4 | Ret | 1 | **2** | 6 | 9 | 3 | 2 | 3 | 3 | 198 |
| 5 | (Italy) Roberto Colciago | | | 3 | 9 | 6 | 10 | 4 | 2 | 3 | 2 | Ret | Ret | DNS | 6 | 3 | Ret | 5 | 3 | 1 | **4** | 141 |
| 6 | (Austria) Philipp Peter | Ret | 3 | **Ret** | Ret | 7 | 6 | Ret | 6 | 2 | 5 | 5 | 3 | 9 | 8 | 4 | Ret | 9 | DNS | 5 | DNS | 96 |
| 7 | (Germany) Christian Abt | 8 | 6 | 8 | 3 | 8 | 7 | 5 | 5 | Ret | 10 | 13 | 11 | 3 | 4 | 7 | Ret | Ret | Ret | 8 | 5 | 85 |
| 8 | (United States) Markus Liesner | 4 | 5 | 1 | **Ret** | 9 | 5 | 18 | 7 | 9 | 9 | Ret | 6 | 17 | 5 | 8 | Ret | 6 | DNS | Ret | 12 | 79 |
| 9 | (Germany) Jörg Müller | | | | | | | | | 6 | Ret | **1** | **Ret** | 6 | 7 | | | DNS | 6 | 4 | 7 | 56 |
| 10 | (Germany) André Fibier | 9 | 10 | 10 | Ret | 11 | Ret | 6 | 9 | 20 | 14 | 6 | 2 | 11 | 15 | Ret | 8 | DNS | 12 | 12 | 10 | 37 |
| 11 | (Germany) Marco Werner | | | | | | | | | 8 | DNS | 7 | 7 | 7 | 9 | 9 | 4 | 7 | 7 | Ret | Ret | 37 |
| 12 | (Germany) Claudia Hürtgen | Ret | Ret | 6 | 2 | 5 | 11 | DNS | 11 | | | Ret | 8 | Ret | 10 | 12 | DNS | | | | | 33 |
| 13 | (Austria) Alexander Wurz | Ret | 7 | 9 | 6 | 20 | 12 | Ret | DNS | 10 | 11 | 9 | 4 | Ret | 12 | | | DNS | 11 | 9 | 19 | 27 |
| 14 | (Germany) Dino Lamby | 6 | 12 | 7 | 5 | 17 | 15 | 12 | 18 | 11 | DNS | 11 | Ret | Ret | 16 | 10 | 6 | | | | | 25 |
| 15 | (Germany) Patrick Bernhardt | Ret | Ret | 14 | 14 | Ret | 13 | 7 | 8 | 13 | 8 | Ret | Ret | 12 | 11 | 11 | 5 | 12 | 8 | 22 | 9 | 23 |
| 16 | (Germany) Michael Graf | Ret | 13 | 13 | 11 | 10 | 9 | 10 | Ret | 12 | 7 | 10 | Ret | Ret | Ret | 14 | 7 | DNS | 13 | 17 | 6 | 19 |
| 17 | (Germany) Danny Pfeil | 11 | Ret | 16 | Ret | 13 | 8 | 9 | 10 | 16 | 13 | Ret | 10 | 8 | 13 | Ret | 11 | 11 | 10 | 11 | Ret | 11 |
| 18 | (Germany) Frank Kremer | 10 | 9 | 15 | 15 | Ret | DNS | 11 | 13 | 14 | 12 | 8 | 9 | 13 | 14 | 13 | 10 | Ret | 14 | 18 | 13 | 9 |
| 19 | (Switzerland) Gian Maria Regazzoni | | | | | | | Ret | 14 | Ret | DNS | Ret | 13 | 10 | 18 | Ret | 12 | 8 | 9 | 10 | 21 | 7 |
| 20 | (Netherlands) Peter Kox | 7 | Ret | Ret | Ret | | | | | | | | | | | | | | | | | 4 |
| 21 | (Switzerland) Christian Fischer | Ret | Ret | 11 | 7 | 12 | 19 | | | | | | | | | Ret | DSQ | | | Ret | Ret | 4 |
| 22 | (Austria) Franz Binder | 12 | 8 | | | 15 | Ret | | | 15 | 16 | | | Ret | DNS | | | | | 14 | 14 | 3 |
| 23 | (United Kingdom) Steven Arnold | | | | | | | | | | | | | | | | | | | Ret | 8 | 3 |
| 24 | (Austria) Patrick Vallant | | | | | | | | | | | | | | | | | 10 | 17 | | | 1 |
| 25 | (Austria) Günter Aberer | 16 | 11 | 19 | Ret | | | 16 | 15 | | | | | | | | | | | | | 0 |
| 26 | (Czech Republic) Tomáš Karhánek | 13 | DNS | 17 | Ret | 19 | 20 | 15 | 16 | 17 | 17 | 12 | 12 | 15 | 17 | DNS | Ret | 13 | 16 | 15 | 15 | 0 |
| 27 | (Italy) Michele Gasparini | | | 12 | 12 | | | | | | | | | | | | | | | | | 0 |
| 28 | (Finland) Marko Mankonen | | | | | 14 | 14 | 13 | 12 | | | | | | | | | | | | | 0 |
| 29 | (Germany) Thomas Wöhrle | | | 18 | 13 | 16 | 17 | DNS | DNS | 18 | Ret | | | DNS | DNS | 15 | 13 | DNS | DNS | DNS | 16 | 0 |
| 30 | (Switzerland) Ruedi Schurter | | | | | | | | | Ret | DNS | | | | | | | | | 13 | DNS | 0 |
| 31 | (Germany) Andreas Schüssler | 14 | DNS | Ret | 16 | 18 | 18 | 14 | Ret | Ret | 15 | | | | | | | | | | | 0 |
| 32 | (Germany) Hans Fertl | 15 | 14 | 20 | Ret | 21 | 16 | Ret | Ret | 19 | 18 | Ret | 14 | 14 | 19 | 16 | 14 | 14 | 18 | 16 | Ret | 0 |
| 33 | (Austria) Franz Wöss | | | | | Ret | 21 | | | DNQ | DNQ | 14 | 15 | | | 17 | 15 | | | 19 | 20 | 0 |
| 34 | (Austria) Georg Holzer | 17 | 15 | | | | | 17 | 17 | | | | | 18 | 21 | | | | | | | 0 |
| 35 | (Germany) Detlef Schoch | DNQ | DNQ | DNQ | DNQ | 22 | 22 | | | DNQ | DNQ | 15 | Ret | Ret | 22 | | | | | | | 0 |
| 36 | (Germany) Sandy Grau | | | | | | | | | | | | | | | | | DNS | 15 | DNS | DNS | 0 |
| 37 | (Austria) Claudia Kreuzsaler | | | | | | | | | | | | | 16 | 20 | | | | | | | 0 |
| 38 | (Austria) Hans Egger-Richter | | | | | | | | | | | | | | | | | DNS | Ret | 20 | 17 | 0 |
| 39 | (Germany) Arnold Wagner | DNS | DNS | DNS | 17 | | | | | | | | | | | | | | | | | 0 |
| 40 | (Switzerland) Roger Studhalter | | | | | | | | | | | | | | | | | | | Ret | 18 | 0 |
| 41 | (Switzerland) Rudolf Meyer | | | | | | | | | | | | | | | | | | | 21 | 22 | 0 |
| | (Austria) Andreas Reiter | | | | | | | | | | | | | | | | | Ret | Ret | | | 0 |
| | (United Kingdom) Warren Hughes | | | | | | | | | | | | | | | | | | | Ret | DNS | 0 |
| | (Germany) Thomas Wagner | DNQ | DNQ | DNS | DNS | | | | | | | | | | | | | | | | | 0 |
| | (Germany) Frank Krämer | | | | | | | | | DNS | DNS | | | | | | | | | | | 0 |
| Pos | Driver | ZOL | | HOC1 | | NÜR1 | | WUN | | NOR | | DIE | | NÜR2 | | SIN | | AVU | | HOC2 | | Points |

| Colour | Result |
|---|---|
| Gold | Winner |
| Silver | Second place |
| Bronze | Third place |
| Green | Points classification |
| Blue | Non-points classification |
| Blue | Non-classified finish (NC) |
| Purple | Retired, not classified (Ret) |
| Red | Did not qualify (DNQ) |
| Red | Did not pre-qualify (DNPQ) |
| Black | Disqualified (DSQ) |
| White | Did not start (DNS) |
| White | Withdrew (WD) |
| White | Race cancelled (C) |
| Blank | Did not practice (DNP) |
| Blank | Did not arrive (DNA) |
| Blank | Excluded (EX) |

**Bold** - Pole
Italics - Fastest Lap
