= 1994 German Formula Three Championship =

Seasons
- ← 1993 1995 →

The 1994 German Formula Three Championship (German: 1994 Deutsche Formel-3-Meisterschaft) was a multi-event motor racing championship for single-seat open wheel formula racing cars that held in Germany and in Belgium. The championship featured drivers competing in two-litre Formula Three racing cars majorly built by Dallara which conform to the technical regulations, or formula, for the championship. It commenced on 9 April at Zolder and ended at Hockenheim on 9 October after ten double-header rounds.

Marko RSM driver Jörg Müller became a champion. He dominated the season, winning eleven of 20 races. Alexander Wurz finished as runner-up with three wins, all achieved at Hockenheim, losing 71 points to Müller. Ralf Schumacher won at Singen, completing the top-three in the drivers' championship. Norberto Fontana and Philipp Peter were the other race winners. Arnd Meier clinched the B-Cup championship title.

== Teams and drivers ==
Entry List
Team	No.	Driver	Chassis	Engine	Rounds
Class A
(Germany) Opel Team WTS	1	(Germany) Sascha Maassen	Dallara F394/003	Opel	All
(Germany) Opel Team WTS	2	(Germany) Ralf Schumacher	Dallara F394/002	Opel	All
(Germany) Volkswagen Motorsport	3	(Italy) Massimiliano Angelelli	Dallara F394/007	Volkswagen	All
(Germany) Volkswagen Motorsport	4	(Germany) Patrick Bernhardt	Dallara F394/008	Volkswagen	All
(Germany) G+M Escom Motorsport	5	(Germany) Michael Graf	Dallara F394/018	Opel	All
(Germany) G+M Escom Motorsport	6	(Austria) Alexander Wurz	Dallara F394/019	Opel	All
(Germany) Abt Motorsport	7	(Germany) Dino Lamby	Dallara F394/005	Opel	1-4
(Germany) Abt Motorsport	7	(Germany) Ronny Melkus	Dallara F394/005	Opel	5-10
(Germany) Abt Motorsport	8	(Germany) Christian Abt	Dallara F394/006	Opel	All
(Austria) Marko RSM	9	(Germany) Jörg Müller	Dallara F394/012	Fiat	All
(Austria) Marko RSM	10	(Austria) Andreas Reiter	Dallara F394/039	Fiat	1-7, 9-10
(Germany) Elf Team Formel 3	11	(Austria) Philipp Peter	Dallara F394/037	Fiat	All
(Germany) Elf Team Formel 3	12	(Italy) Roberto Colciago	Dallara F394/049	Fiat	1-4
(Germany) Elf Team Formel 3	12	(Germany) Marco Werner	Dallara F394/049	Fiat	5-10
(Switzerland) Eggenberger Motorsport	14	(Switzerland) Johnny Hauser	Dallara F394/032	Mugen-Honda	1-5, 7-8
(Switzerland) Eggenberger Motorsport	14	(Switzerland) Christian Fischer	Dallara F394/032	Mugen-Honda	6
(Switzerland) KMS	15	(Argentina) Norberto Fontana	Dallara F394/015	Opel	All
(Switzerland) KMS	16	(Portugal) Frederico Viegas	Dallara F394/016	Opel	1-6
(Switzerland) KMS	16	(Netherlands) Martijn Koene	Dallara F394/016	Opel	7
(Switzerland) KMS	16	(Austria) Ralf Kalaschek	Dallara F394/016	Opel	10
(Germany) Team Sical	17	(Portugal) Manuel Gião	Dallara F394/021	Opel	1-8
(Germany) Team Sical	17	(Portugal) Rui Águas	Dallara F394/021	Opel	10
(Germany) Team Sical	18	(Portugal) Pedro Couceiro	Dallara F394/020	Opel	All
(Germany) Racing for Belarus	20	(Germany) André Fibier	Jak JK26/0003	Opel	1-3
(Germany) Racing for Belarus	20	(Denmark) Brian Taulborg	Jak JK26/0003	Opel	5
(Italy) Parma Motorsport	21	(Germany) Hans Fertl	Dallara F394/043	Fiat	1-5
(Italy) Parma Motorsport	21	(France) Sebastian Mordillo	Dallara F394/060	Fiat	10
(Italy) Parma Motorsport	22	(Austria) Ralf Kalaschek	Dallara F394/060	Fiat	1-6
(France) Saulnier Sport	23	(France) Christophe Tinseau	Dallara F393/022	Opel	7, 10
(France) Saulnier Sport	25	(France) Benjamin Roy	Dallara F393/041	Opel	10
(Belgium) Pilette Speed Tradition	24	(Italy) Paolo Coloni	Pilette PWT 94C/1032	Fiat	9
(Belgium) Pilette Speed Tradition	24	(Germany) Dirk Müller (Note: Replaced Jérémie Dufour after the first qualifying)	Pilette PWT 94C/1032	Fiat	10
(United Kingdom) Richard Arnold Developments	27	(United Kingdom) Steven Arnold	Dallara F393/043	Fiat	10
Class B
(Germany) Volkswagen Motorsport	50	(Austria) Oliver Tichy	Dallara F393/033	Volkswagen	All
(Switzerland) KMS	51	(Germany) Klaus Graf	Dallara F393/009	Opel	All
(Austria) Franz Wöss Racing	52	(Austria) Patrick Vallant	Dallara F393/018	Volkswagen	1-2
(Austria) Franz Wöss Racing	52	(Austria) Martin Albrecht	Dallara F393/018	Volkswagen	5
(Austria) Franz Wöss Racing	52	(Austria) Franz Wöss	Dallara F393/018	Volkswagen	3-4, 6-7, 9-10
(Austria) Franz Wöss Racing	53	(Austria) Josef Neuhauser	Ralt RT36/956	Volkswagen	5
(Austria) Franz Wöss Racing	53	(Austria) Georg Holzer	Ralt RT36/956	Volkswagen	10
(Czech Republic) WTS-TKF Racing	54	(Czech Republic) Tomáš Karhánek	Dallara F393/040	Opel	1
(Czech Republic) WTS-TKF Racing	54	(Germany) André Fibier	Dallara F393/040	Opel	4-10
(Czech Republic) WTS-TKF Racing	55	(Japan) Katsumi Yamamoto	Dallara F393/034	Opel	All
(Germany) AMC Diepholz	56	(Germany) Arnd Meier	Dallara F393/020	Opel	All
(Austria) Racing Team Aberer	58	(Switzerland) Raphael Künzi	Dallara F393/031	Fiat	1
(Germany) Bergmeister Sport	59	(Germany) Tim Bergmeister	Dallara F393/004	Opel	All
(Germany) Westwood Racing	60	(Germany) Helmut Schwitalla	Dallara F393/003	Opel	1-2
(Germany) Westwood Racing	60	(Germany) Wolf Henzler	Dallara F393/003	Opel	8-10
(Germany) Westwood Racing	61	(Germany) Wolfgang Koslowski	Dallara F393/065	Opel	10
(Germany) Hofmann Motorsport	62	(Germany) Thomas Winkelhock	Dallara F393/036	Opel	All
(Germany) Hofmann Motorsport	63	(Germany) Christian Menzel	Dallara F393/035	Opel	All
(Switzerland) Jo Zeller Racing	64	(Switzerland) Jo Zeller	Dallara F393/002	Fiat	5, 9-10
(Switzerland) Jo Zeller Racing	65	(Switzerland) Urs Rüttimann	Ralt RT37/1004	Mugen-Honda	10

== Calendar ==
With the exception of round at Zolder in Belgium, all rounds took place on German soil.

Round		Location	Circuit	Date	Supporting
1	R1	Heusden-Zolder, Belgium	Circuit Zolder	9 April	25. Bergischer Löwe
1	R2	Heusden-Zolder, Belgium	Circuit Zolder	10 April	25. Bergischer Löwe
2	R1	Hockenheim, Germany	Hockenheimring	23 April	AvD/MAC-Rennsportfestival
2	R2	Hockenheim, Germany	Hockenheimring	24 April	AvD/MAC-Rennsportfestival
3	R1	Nürburg, Germany	Nürburgring	7 May	56. ADAC Eifelrennen
3	R2	Nürburg, Germany	Nürburgring	8 May	56. ADAC Eifelrennen
4	R1	Wunstorf, Germany	Wunstorf	11 June	ADAC Flugplatzrennen Wunstorf
4	R2	Wunstorf, Germany	Wunstorf	12 June	ADAC Flugplatzrennen Wunstorf
5	R1	Nuremberg, Germany	Norisring	25 June	52. ADAC Norisring-Rennen - 200 Meilen von Nürnberg
5	R2	Nuremberg, Germany	Norisring	26 June	52. ADAC Norisring-Rennen - 200 Meilen von Nürnberg
6	R1	Diepholz, Germany	Diepholz Airfield Circuit	23 July	27. ADAC-Flugplatzrennen Diepholz
6	R2	Diepholz, Germany	Diepholz Airfield Circuit	24 July	27. ADAC-Flugplatzrennen Diepholz
7	R1	Nürburg, Germany	Nürburgring	20 August	ADAC Großer Preis der Tourenwagen
7	R2	Nürburg, Germany	Nürburgring	21 August	ADAC Großer Preis der Tourenwagen
8	R1	Berlin, Germany	AVUS	3 September	ADAC Avus Rennen
8	R2	Berlin, Germany	AVUS	4 September	ADAC Avus Rennen
9	R1	Singen, Germany	Alemannenring	17 September	4. ADAC-Preis Singen
9	R2	Singen, Germany	Alemannenring	18 September	4. ADAC-Preis Singen
10	R1	Hockenheim, Germany	Hockenheimring	8 October	DMV-Preis Hockenheim
10	R2	Hockenheim, Germany	Hockenheimring	9 October	DMV-Preis Hockenheim

== Results ==
Round		Circuit	Pole position	Fastest lap	Winning driver	Winning team	B Class Winner
1	R1	Circuit Zolder	(Germany) Jörg Müller	Cancelled due to snow			
1	R2	Circuit Zolder	(Germany) Jörg Müller	(Germany) Sascha Maassen	(Germany) Jörg Müller	(Austria) Marko RSM	(Austria) Oliver Tichy
2	R1	Hockenheimring	(Germany) Sascha Maassen	(Germany) Sascha Maassen	(Austria) Alexander Wurz	(Germany) G+M Escom Motorsport	(Austria) Oliver Tichy
2	R2	Hockenheimring	(Austria) Alexander Wurz	(Austria) Alexander Wurz	(Austria) Alexander Wurz	(Germany) G+M Escom Motorsport	(Germany) Thomas Winkelhock
3	R1	Nürburgring	(Germany) Sascha Maassen	(Austria) Alexander Wurz	(Germany) Jörg Müller	(Austria) Marko RSM	(Germany) Christian Menzel
3	R2	Nürburgring	(Germany) Jörg Müller	(Germany) Ralf Schumacher	(Germany) Jörg Müller	(Austria) Marko RSM	(Germany) Klaus Graf
4	R1	Wunstorf	(Germany) Arnd Meier	(Germany) Sascha Maassen	(Argentina) Norberto Fontana	(Switzerland) KMS	(Germany) Arnd Meier
4	R2	Wunstorf	(Argentina) Norberto Fontana	(Germany) Jörg Müller	(Germany) Jörg Müller	(Austria) Marko RSM	(Germany) Arnd Meier
5	R1	Norisring	(Germany) Jörg Müller	(Germany) Christian Abt	(Germany) Jörg Müller	(Austria) Marko RSM	(Germany) Thomas Winkelhock
5	R2	Norisring	(Germany) Jörg Müller	(Portugal) Pedro Couceiro	(Austria) Philipp Peter	(Germany) Elf Team Formel 3	(Germany) Thomas Winkelhock
6	R1	Diepholz Airfield Circuit	(Germany) Sascha Maassen	(Germany) Patrick Bernhardt	(Germany) Jörg Müller	(Austria) Marko RSM	(Germany) Tim Bergmeister
6	R2	Diepholz Airfield Circuit	(Germany) Jörg Müller	(Austria) Andreas Reiter	(Germany) Jörg Müller	(Austria) Marko RSM	(Germany) André Fibier
7	R1	Nürburgring	(Argentina) Norberto Fontana	(Germany) Ralf Schumacher	(Argentina) Norberto Fontana	(Switzerland) KMS	(Germany) André Fibier
7	R2	Nürburgring	(Argentina) Norberto Fontana	(Austria) Alexander Wurz	(Argentina) Norberto Fontana	(Switzerland) KMS	(Germany) André Fibier
8	R1	AVUS	(Germany) Jörg Müller	(Germany) Jörg Müller	(Germany) Jörg Müller	(Austria) Marko RSM	(Germany) Arnd Meier
8	R2	AVUS	(Germany) Jörg Müller	(Germany) Jörg Müller	(Germany) Jörg Müller	(Austria) Marko RSM	(Germany) Arnd Meier
9	R1	Alemannenring	(Germany) Sascha Maassen	(Germany) Jörg Müller	(Germany) Ralf Schumacher	(Germany) Opel Team WTS	(Germany) Arnd Meier
9	R2	Alemannenring	(Germany) Ralf Schumacher	(Germany) Jörg Müller	(Germany) Jörg Müller	(Austria) Marko RSM	(Germany) Arnd Meier
10	R1	Hockenheimring	(Germany) Ralf Schumacher	(Germany) Ralf Schumacher	(Germany) Jörg Müller	(Austria) Marko RSM	(Austria) Oliver Tichy
10	R2	Hockenheimring	(Germany) Jörg Müller	(Germany) Ralf Schumacher	(Austria) Alexander Wurz	(Germany) G+M Escom Motorsport	(Germany) Tim Bergmeister

== Championship standings ==
=== A-Class ===
- Points are awarded as follows:

1	2	3	4	5	6	7	8	9	10
20	15	12	10	8	6	4	3	2	1

Pos	Driver	ZOL		HOC1		NÜR1		WUN		NOR		DIE		NÜR2		AVU		SIN		HOC2		Points
1	(Germany) Jörg Müller	**C**	**1**	4	3	1	**1**	14	1	**1**	**2**	1	**1**	6	5	**1**	**1**	2	1	1	**7**	290
2	(Austria) Alexander Wurz	C	4	1	**1**	3	3	Ret	6	4	3	3	3	3	2	4	3	5	3	7	1	219
3	(Germany) Ralf Schumacher	C	3	3	9	Ret	8	2	Ret	Ret	10	2	2	2	3	2	14	1	**2**	**DSQ**	6	158
4	(Germany) Sascha Maassen	C	2	**14**	10	**4**	Ret	4	4	2	5	**12**	8	4	4	6	4	**3**	5	4	2	153
5	(Portugal) Pedro Couceiro	C	5	2	2	2	2	5	2	14	4	18	Ret	19	11	7	6	17	11	3	3	135
6	(Argentina) Norberto Fontana	C	15	11	8	Ret	9	1	**8**	5	20	Ret	13	**1**	**1**	3	2	Ret	DNS	2	Ret	118
7	(Austria) Philipp Peter	C	13	5	4	13	Ret	8	5	3	1	5	4	7	7	8	Ret	9	6	5	4	116
8	(Germany) Christian Abt	C	6	10	6	11	11	16	Ret	8	6	Ret	7	5	6	5	5	4	Ret	17	11	66
9	(Italy) Massimiliano Angelelli	C	12	Ret	12	6	7	7	7	11	7	6	5	15	14	10	7	8	4	6	8	63
10	(Portugal) Frederico Viegas	C	8	9	7	10	5	6	3	Ret	14	13	12									36
11	(Germany) Arnd Meier	C	14	17	16	8	16	**3**	11	15	16	DNS	Ret	11	Ret	9	10	6	7	15	13	28
12	(Austria) Andreas Reiter	C	7	7	Ret	14	Ret	11	Ret	DNQ	DNQ	11	6	Ret	16			14	DSQ	10	5	23
13	(Germany) Christian Menzel	C	10	19	17	5	6	DNS	DNS	10	12	Ret	16	13	13	Ret	16	7	8	12	14	23
14	(Germany) Marco Werner									6	8	8	Ret	23	22	11	8	10	Ret	8	9	21
15	(Germany) Klaus Graf	C	18	16	20	7	4	Ret	DNS	DNQ	DNQ	Ret	17	20	Ret	Ret	Ret	13	Ret	14	18	14
16	(Germany) Patrick Bernhardt	C	Ret	DSQ	EX	12	10	17	17	Ret	13	4	9	DNS	DNS	14	Ret	Ret	Ret	22	Ret	13
17	(Italy) Roberto Colciago	C	21	8	5	21	17	Ret	18													11
18	(Germany) André Fibier	C	Ret	Ret	Ret	24	18	13	15	Ret	Ret	9	10	9	8	16	11	11	9	19	16	10
19	(Portugal) Manuel Gião	C	Ret	20	Ret	19	15	10	9	13	9	Ret	15	10	10	DNS	DNS					7
20	(Switzerland) Johnny Hauser	C	19	6	Ret	15	Ret	Ret	13	19	Ret			12	12	15	Ret					6
21	(Germany) Michael Graf	C	16	22	15	22	12	12	10	7	Ret	DNS	DNS	DNS	17	13	Ret	16	Ret	20	DNS	5
22	(Germany) Tim Bergmeister	C	23	15	18	18	14	15	12	17	19	7	11	16	18	DNS	13	15	10	13	12	5
23	(Netherlands) Martijn Koene													8	9							5
24	(Austria) Oliver Tichy	C	9	12	13	Ret	DNS	9	16	20	Ret	10	Ret	14	Ret	Ret	12	18	12	11	Ret	5
25	(France) Christophe Tinseau													DNS	DNS					9	10	3
26	(Japan) Katsumi Yamamoto	C	20	Ret	19	9	13	Ret	14	DNQ	DNQ	15	18	18	19	Ret	Ret	Ret	15	21	20	2
27	(Germany) Thomas Winkelhock	C	17	13	11	17	Ret	20	Ret	9	11	Ret	Ret	17	15	12	Ret	19	14	26	Ret	2
28	(Germany) Ronny Melkus									DNQ	DNQ	16	Ret	21	20	Ret	9	12	Ret	25	21	2
	(Germany) Dino Lamby	C	11	21	14	Ret	Ret	DNS	DNS													0
	(Switzerland) Christian Fischer											14	14									0
	(Germany) Wolf Henzler															17	15	Ret	13	DNS	DNS	0
	(United Kingdom) Steven Arnold																			18	15	0
	(France) Sebastian Mordillo																			24	22	0
	(Switzerland) Raphael Künzi	C	22																			0
	(Austria) Franz Wöss	C	24			23	19	19	19			17	19	22	21			Ret	17	27	23	0
	(Austria) Ralf Kalaschek	C	Ret	Ret	Ret	16	20	Ret	Ret	16	17	Ret	Ret							23	17	0
	(Switzerland) Jo Zeller									18	18							20	16	16	19	0
	(Germany) Wolfgang Koslowski																			29	24	0
	(Germany) Dirk Müller																			31	25	0
	(Austria) Georg Holzer																			30	26	0
	(Switzerland) Urs Rüttimann																			28	Ret	0
	(Austria) Patrick Vallant	C	Ret	Ret	Ret																	0
	(Germany) Hans Fertl	C	Ret	18	Ret	20	DNS	18	Ret	12	15											0
	(Germany) Helmut Schwitalla	C	Ret	DNS	DNS																	0
	(France) Benjamin Roy																			DNS	27	0
	(Portugal) Rui Águas																			DSQ	28	0
	(Italy) Paolo Coloni																	DNS	DNS			0
	(France) Jérémie Dufour																			DNS	DNS	0
	(Czech Republic) Tomas Karhanek	C	DNS																			0
	(Denmark) Brian Taulborg									DNQ	DNQ											0
	(Austria) Martin Albrecht									DNQ	DNQ											0
	(Austria) Josef Neuhauser									DNQ	DNQ											0
Pos	Driver	ZOL		HOC1		NÜR1		WUN		NOR		DIE		NÜR2		AVU		SIN		HOC2		Points

Colour	Result
Gold	Winner
Silver	Second place
Bronze	Third place
Green	Points classification
Blue	Non-points classification
Blue	Non-classified finish (NC)
Purple	Retired, not classified (Ret)
Red	Did not qualify (DNQ)
Red	Did not pre-qualify (DNPQ)
Black	Disqualified (DSQ)
White	Did not start (DNS)
White	Withdrew (WD)
White	Race cancelled (C)
Blank	Did not practice (DNP)
Blank	Did not arrive (DNA)
Blank	Excluded (EX)

**Bold** - Pole
Italics - Fastest Lap
