= 1992 German Formula Three Championship =

Seasons
- ← 1991 1993 →

The 1992 German Formula Three Championship (German: 1992 Deutsche Formel-3-Meisterschaft) was a multi-event motor racing championship for single-seat open wheel formula racing cars that held across Europe. The championship featured drivers competing in two-litre Formula Three racing cars which conform to the technical regulations, or formula, for the championship. It commenced on 4 April at Zolder and ended at Hockenheim on 11 October after thirteen double-header rounds.

Opel Team WTS driver Pedro Lamy became the first and only Portuguese champion. He won eleven races and scored another seven podium finishes on his way to championship title. Marco Werner finished as runner-up, losing the title battle after the retirement from the penultimate race of the season. Sascha Maassen was victorious at Wunstorf and Alemannenring. Diogo Castro Santos and Philipp Peter completed the top-five in the drivers' championship. Michael Krumm and Jörg Müller were the other race winners. Christian Abt clinched the B-Cup championship title.

== Teams and drivers ==
Entry List
Team	No.	Driver	Chassis	Engine	Rounds
Class A
(Germany) Volkswagen Motorsport	1	(Portugal) Diogo Castro Santos	Ralt RT36/950	Volkswagen	All
(Germany) Volkswagen Motorsport	2	(Germany) Sascha Maassen	Ralt RT36/956	Volkswagen	All
(Germany) Beru Zündtechnik Racing Team — GM Motorsport	3	(Germany) Marco Werner	Ralt RT36/980	Opel	All
(Germany) Beru Zündtechnik Racing Team — GM Motorsport	4	(Germany) Michael Krumm	Ralt RT36/926	Opel	All
(Germany) ONS Nachwuchsteam — Bongers Motorsport	5	(Germany) Jörg Müller	Reynard 923/014	Opel	All
(Germany) Opel Team WTS	7	(United States) Markus Liesner	Reynard 923/008	Opel	All
(Germany) Opel Team WTS	8	(Portugal) Pedro Lamy	Reynard 923/005	Opel	All
(Austria) Vienna Racing Team	9	(Netherlands) Peter Kox	Eufra 391/03	Mugen-Honda	4
(Austria) Vienna Racing Team	9	(Germany) Frank Krämer	Eufra 391/03	Mugen-Honda	6-8
(Germany) Opel Team Schübel	11	(Germany) Wolfgang Kaufmann	Dallara 392/046	Opel	All
(Germany) Opel Team Schübel	12	(Australia) Russell Ingall	Dallara 392/045	Opel	All
(Austria) RSM Marko	14	(Austria) Patrick Vallant	Reynard 923/010	Alfa Romeo	1-4, 6-13
(Austria) RSM Marko	14	(Germany) Marc Hessel	Reynard 923/010	Alfa Romeo	5
(Austria) RSM Marko	15	(Germany) Claudia Hürtgen	Reynard 923/011	Alfa Romeo	All
(Switzerland) Jacques Isler Racing	16	(Austria) Philipp Peter	Dallara 392/021	Alfa Romeo	All
(Switzerland) Jacques Isler Racing	17	(Switzerland) Jacques Isler	Dallara 392/039	Alfa Romeo	1-2
(Switzerland) Jacques Isler Racing	21	(Sweden) Peter Aslund	Dallara 392/039	Alfa Romeo	4-5
(Switzerland) Jacques Isler Racing	21	(Austria) Mercedes Stermitz	Dallara 392/039	Alfa Romeo	7-11
(Switzerland) Jacques Isler Racing	21	(Germany) Dino Lamby	Dallara 392/039	Alfa Romeo	12-13
(Germany) AHS Motorsport	18	(Germany) Martin Santner	Ralt RT36/984	Alfa Romeo	1-4, 7-8, 11-13
(Germany) AHS Motorsport	18	(Finland) Pekka Herva	Ralt RT36/984	Alfa Romeo	5, 10
(Germany) AHS Motorsport	18	(South Africa) Hilton Cowie	Ralt RT36/984	Alfa Romeo	6
(Netherlands) Nomag Racing	19	(Netherlands) Franc ten Wolde	Van Diemen RF92	Mugen-Honda	1-6
(Switzerland) Team KMS	22	(Switzerland) Ruedi Schurter	Dallara 392/036	Opel	6-7
(Switzerland) Team KMS	22	(Germany) Danny Pfeil	Dallara 392/036	Opel	13
(Italy) RC Motorsport	23	(Italy) Mario Andrea Vismara	Dallara 392/028	Opel	12
(Italy) RC Motorsport	24	(Italy) Massimiliano Angelelli	Dallara 392/020	Opel	12
Class B
(Germany) Beru Zündtechnik Racing Team — GM Motorsport	50	(Germany) Frank Kremer	Ralt RT35/876	Opel	All
(Germany) Abt Motorsport	51	(Germany) Christian Abt	Ralt RT35/892	Volkswagen	All
(Denmark) Svend Hansen	52	(Denmark) Svend Hansen	Ralt RT33/802	Volkswagen	All
(Czechoslovakia) Tomas Karhanek	53	(Czechoslovakia) Tomas Karhanek	Reynard 913/006	Opel	5-6, 8
(Switzerland) A&M Computer	54	(Switzerland) Rene Wartmann	Dallara 391/038	Volkswagen	2-10
(Switzerland) A&M Computer	54	(Austria) Claudia Kreuzsaler	Dallara 391/038	Volkswagen	12-13
(Germany) Thomas Wagner	60	(Germany) Thomas Wagner	Reynard 873/061	Volkswagen	3, 5-6
(Austria) Franz Binder	61	(Austria) Franz Binder	Reynard 913/007	Opel	9, 12-13
(Germany) Albrecht Trautzburg	62	(Germany) Albrecht Trautzburg	Reynard 863/039	Volkswagen	10
(Germany) H&R Spezialfedern — Lohmann Motorsport	63	(Germany) Marian Hamprecht	Dallara 389/020	Volkswagen	10, 13
(Switzerland) Team KMS	64	(Monaco) Thomas Bleiner	Dallara 391/011	Opel	6
(Switzerland) Team KMS	64	(Switzerland) Hanspeter Kaufmann	Dallara 391/011	Opel	7
(Switzerland) Team KMS	64	(Switzerland) Rene Wartmann	Dallara 391/011	Opel	11-13
(Italy) MCM Motor Car Saxxon	65	(Italy) Renato Prioli	Eufra 390/03	Opel	7
(Italy) MCM Motor Car Saxxon	65	(Italy) Guido Daccò	Eufra 390/03	Opel	10
(Austria) Günter Aberer	66	(Austria) Günter Aberer	Dallara 389/049	Volkswagen	10
(Austria) Kurt Fischer	69	(Austria) Kurt Fischer	Ralt RT34/818	Volkswagen	7-8, 12
(Austria) Franz Wöss	70	(Austria) Franz Wöss	Ralt RT35/884	Volkswagen	All
(Austria) Josef Neuhauser	75	(Austria) Josef Neuhauser	Reynard 903/014	Volkswagen	1-4, 7-8
(Germany) Joachim Ryschka	77	(Germany) Joachim Ryschka	Reynard 903/038	Volkswagen	1-4, 7-8, 10, 12
(South Africa) Fred Goddard Racing	78	(South Africa) Stephen Watson	Ralt RT34/859	Mugen-Honda	13
(South Africa) Fred Goddard Racing	79	(United Kingdom) Steven Arnold	Ralt RT35/870	Mugen-Honda	13
(South Africa) Fred Goddard Racing	80	(South Africa) Hilton Cowie	Reynard 913/001	Mugen-Honda	13

== Calendar ==
Round		Location	Circuit	Date	Supporting
1	R1	Heusden-Zolder, Belgium	Circuit Zolder	4 April	XXIII. AvD "Bergischer Löwe"
1	R2	Heusden-Zolder, Belgium	Circuit Zolder	5 April	XXIII. AvD "Bergischer Löwe"
2	R1	Nürburg, Germany	Nürburgring	18 April	54. ADAC Eifelrennen
2	R2	Nürburg, Germany	Nürburgring	19 April	54. ADAC Eifelrennen
3	R1	Wunstorf, Germany	Wunstorf	2 May	ADAC-Flugplatzrennen Wunstorf
3	R2	Wunstorf, Germany	Wunstorf	3 May	ADAC-Flugplatzrennen Wunstorf
4	R1	Berlin, Germany	AVUS	9 May	ADAC-Avus-Rennen
4	R2	Berlin, Germany	AVUS	10 May	ADAC-Avus-Rennen
5	R1	Nürburg, Germany	Nürburgring	16 May	ADAC Bilstein Supersprint
5	R2	Nürburg, Germany	Nürburgring	17 May	ADAC Bilstein Supersprint
6	R1	Hockenheim, Germany	Hockenheimring	23 May	AvD/MAC Rennsport-Festival
6	R2	Hockenheim, Germany	Hockenheimring	25 May	AvD/MAC Rennsport-Festival
7	R1	Nuremberg, Germany	Norisring	27 June	ADAC-Norisring-Trophäe "200 Meilen von Nürnberg"
7	R2	Nuremberg, Germany	Norisring	28 June	ADAC-Norisring-Trophäe "200 Meilen von Nürnberg"
8	R1	Brno, Czechoslovakia	Masaryk Circuit	11 July	Grand Prix Brno "AvD East/West Rennen Brünn""
8	R2	Brno, Czechoslovakia	Masaryk Circuit	12 July	Grand Prix Brno "AvD East/West Rennen Brünn""
9	R1	Diepholz, Germany	Diepholz Airfield Circuit	15 August	25. ADAC-Flugplatzrennen Diepholz
9	R2	Diepholz, Germany	Diepholz Airfield Circuit	16 August	25. ADAC-Flugplatzrennen Diepholz
10	R1	Nürburg, Germany	Nürburgring	22 August	ADAC Formel Festival
10	R2	Nürburg, Germany	Nürburgring	23 August	ADAC Formel Festival
11	R1	Singen, Germany	Alemannenring	5 September	2. ADAC-Preis Singen
11	R2	Singen, Germany	Alemannenring	6 September	2. ADAC-Preis Singen
12	R1	Nürburg, Germany	Nürburgring	19 September	ADAC Großer Preis der Tourenwagen
12	R2	Nürburg, Germany	Nürburgring	20 September	ADAC Großer Preis der Tourenwagen
13	R1	Hockenheim, Germany	Hockenheimring	10 October	DMV-Preis Hockenheim
13	R2	Hockenheim, Germany	Hockenheimring	11 October	DMV-Preis Hockenheim

== Results ==
Round		Circuit	Pole position	Fastest lap	Winning driver	Winning team	B Class Winner
1	R1	(Belgium) Circuit Zolder	(Germany) Jörg Müller	(Germany) Marco Werner	(Germany) Marco Werner	(Germany) GM Motorsport	(Germany) Frank Kremer
1	R2	(Belgium) Circuit Zolder	(Germany) Marco Werner	(Germany) Jörg Müller	(Germany) Michael Krumm	(Germany) GM Motorsport	(Denmark) Svend Hansen
2	R1	(Germany) Nürburgring	(Austria) Philipp Peter	(Portugal) Pedro Lamy	(Portugal) Pedro Lamy	(Germany) Opel Team WTS	(Denmark) Svend Hansen
2	R2	(Germany) Nürburgring	(Portugal) Pedro Lamy	(Germany) Sascha Maassen	(Germany) Sascha Maassen	(Germany) Volkswagen Motorsport	(Germany) Christian Abt
3	R1	(Germany) Wunstorf	(Portugal) Pedro Lamy	(Germany) Marco Werner	(Germany) Sascha Maassen	(Germany) Volkswagen Motorsport	(Germany) Christian Abt
3	R2	(Germany) Wunstorf	(Germany) Sascha Maassen	(Germany) Jörg Müller	(Germany) Michael Krumm	(Germany) G+M Escom Motorsport	(Denmark) Svend Hansen
4	R1	(Germany) AVUS	(Austria) Philipp Peter	(Germany) Marco Werner	(Germany) Jörg Müller	(Germany) Bongers Motorsport	(Denmark) Svend Hansen
4	R2	(Germany) AVUS	(Germany) Jörg Müller	(Portugal) Pedro Lamy	(Portugal) Pedro Lamy	(Germany) Opel Team WTS	(Germany) Frank Kremer
5	R1	(Germany) Nürburgring	(Germany) Marco Werner	(Portugal) Pedro Lamy	(Portugal) Pedro Lamy	(Germany) Opel Team WTS	(Germany) Christian Abt
5	R2	(Germany) Nürburgring	(Portugal) Pedro Lamy	(Germany) Marco Werner	(Portugal) Pedro Lamy	(Germany) Opel Team WTS	(Germany) Christian Abt
6	R1	(Germany) Hockenheimring	(Portugal) Pedro Lamy	(Portugal) Pedro Lamy	(Portugal) Pedro Lamy	(Germany) Opel Team WTS	(Germany) Frank Kremer
6	R2	(Germany) Hockenheimring	(Portugal) Pedro Lamy	(Portugal) Pedro Lamy	(Portugal) Diogo Castro Santos	(Germany) Volkswagen Motorsport	(Germany) Frank Kremer
7	R1	(Germany) Norisring	(Portugal) Diogo Castro Santos	(Germany) Marco Werner	(Portugal) Diogo Castro Santos	(Germany) Volkswagen Motorsport	(Germany) Christian Abt
7	R2	(Germany) Norisring	(Portugal) Diogo Castro Santos	(Germany) Sascha Maassen	(Portugal) Diogo Castro Santos	(Germany) Volkswagen Motorsport	(Switzerland) Rene Wartmann
8	R1	(Czechoslovakia) Masaryk Circuit	(Portugal) Pedro Lamy	(Portugal) Diogo Castro Santos	(Portugal) Pedro Lamy	(Germany) Opel Team WTS	(Switzerland) Rene Wartmann
8	R2	(Czechoslovakia) Masaryk Circuit	(Portugal) Pedro Lamy	(Portugal) Pedro Lamy	(Portugal) Pedro Lamy	(Germany) Opel Team WTS	(Germany) Christian Abt
9	R1	(Germany) Diepholz Airfield Circuit	(Germany) Marco Werner	(Germany) Marco Werner	(Germany) Marco Werner	(Germany) GM Motorsport	(Switzerland) Rene Wartmann
9	R2	(Germany) Diepholz Airfield Circuit	(Germany) Marco Werner	(Germany) Michael Krumm	(Germany) Marco Werner	(Germany) GM Motorsport	(Switzerland) Rene Wartmann
10	R1	(Germany) Nürburgring	(Germany) Marco Werner	(Germany) Marco Werner	(Portugal) Pedro Lamy	(Germany) Opel Team WTS	(Germany) Christian Abt
10	R2	(Germany) Nürburgring	(Portugal) Pedro Lamy	(Germany) Marco Werner	(Germany) Marco Werner	(Germany) GM Motorsport	(Germany) Frank Kremer
11	R1	(Germany) Alemannenring	(Germany) Sascha Maassen	(Germany) Sascha Maassen	(Germany) Sascha Maassen	(Germany) Volkswagen Motorsport	(Germany) Christian Abt
11	R2	(Germany) Alemannenring	(Germany) Sascha Maassen	(Germany) Marco Werner	(Germany) Sascha Maassen	(Germany) Volkswagen Motorsport	(Germany) Christian Abt
12	R1	(Germany) Nürburgring	(Portugal) Pedro Lamy	(Portugal) Pedro Lamy	(Portugal) Pedro Lamy	(Germany) Opel Team WTS	(Germany) Christian Abt
12	R2	(Germany) Nürburgring	(Portugal) Pedro Lamy	(Germany) Marco Werner	(Germany) Marco Werner	(Germany) GM Motorsport	(Germany) Christian Abt
13	R1	(Germany) Hockenheimring	(Portugal) Pedro Lamy	(Portugal) Pedro Lamy	(Portugal) Pedro Lamy	(Germany) Opel Team WTS	(United Kingdom) Steven Arnold
13	R2	(Germany) Hockenheimring	(Portugal) Pedro Lamy	(Germany) Marco Werner	(Portugal) Pedro Lamy	(Germany) Opel Team WTS	(United Kingdom) Steven Arnold

== Championship standings ==
=== A-Class ===
- Points are awarded as follows:

1	2	3	4	5	6	7	8	9	10
20	15	12	10	8	6	4	3	2	1

Pos	Driver	ZOL (Belgium)		NÜR1 (Germany)		WUN (Germany)		AVU (Germany)		NÜR2 (Germany)		HOC1 (Germany)		NOR (Germany)		BRN (Czechoslovakia)		DIE (Germany)		NÜR3 (Germany)		SIN (Germany)		NÜR4 (Germany)		HOC2 (Germany)		Points
1	(Portugal) Pedro Lamy	Ret	5	1	**16**	**Ret**	Ret	8	1	1	**1**	**1**	**2**	3	2	**1**	**1**	3	4	1	**2**	2	2	**1**	**Ret**	**1**	**1**	340
2	(Germany) Marco Werner	1	**3**	3	1	5	1	2	9	**2**	2	Ret	Ret	2	3	5	10	**1**	**1**	**2**	1	Ret	5	2	1	Ret	13	293
3	(Germany) Sascha Maassen	Ret	6	5	8	1	**4**	3	5	9	7	2	3	4	4	3	4	2	2	4	4	**1**	**1**	5	4	6	3	268
4	(Portugal) Diogo Castro Santos	4	2	Ret	3	3	7	Ret	Ret	3	3	3	1	**1**	**1**	2	2	4	12	6	3	DNS	DNS	4	3	Ret	16	229
5	(Austria) Philipp Peter	3	4	**2**	4	16	6	**Ret**	3	7	9	11	9	5	6	6	6	5	5	7	5	Ret	4	7	DNS	3	2	168
6	(Germany) Michael Krumm	2	1	Ret	6	6	2	Ret	8	6	6	4	6	20	10	8	7	6	3	5	8	4	9	6	Ret	Ret	4	158
7	(Germany) Jörg Müller	**8**	Ret	15	2	Ret	3	1	**Ret**	Ret	8	6	4	7	5	11	8	Ret	6	Ret	6	DSQ	12	24	Ret	5	7	108
8	(Germany) Wolfgang Kaufmann	11	Ret	4	5	10	5	5	2	5	4	Ret	7	9	11	Ret	13	12	Ret	9	9	3	3	11	DNS	11	Ret	102
9	(Australia) Russell Ingall	16	8	Ret	9	DNS	9	4	4	8	5	Ret	Ret	16	8	4	5	Ret	DNS	3	Ret	Ret	8	Ret	6	2	Ret	95
10	(United States) Markus Liesner	6	7	16	11	9	10	6	6	Ret	11	5	15	10	7	9	15	Ret	8	8	Ret	Ret	DNS	9	5	4	Ret	66
11	(Austria) Patrick Vallant	5	15	Ret	10	8	Ret	DNS	DNS			7	5	14	17	7	3	10	7	13	Ret	Ret	Ret	16	8	9	8	53
12	(Germany) Claudia Hürtgen	7	Ret	6	7	13	11	Ret	12	4	10	14	8	Ret	15	Ret	9	DNS	DNS	10	7	6	Ret	8	Ret	Ret	10	45
13	(Germany) Christian Abt	13	11	11	12	2	14	Ret	14	13	15	10	Ret	11	14	13	12	8	DSQ	11	11	5	6	10	7	Ret	Ret	38
14	(Italy) Massimiliano Angelelli																							3	2			27
15	(Denmark) Svend Hansen	Ret	9	7	13	4	8	7	11	15	17	9	13	12	16	18	17	Ret	Ret	15	16	9	Ret	14	12	15	14	27
16	(Germany) Frank Kremer	12	10	10	DNS	7	13	9	10	17	19	8	11	Ret	18	Ret	16	11	11	12	10	8	10	17	19	10	11	18
17	(Switzerland) Rene Wartmann			17	14	12	DNS	10	13	14	16	Ret	12	Ret	12	12	14	7	9	14	13	DSQ	7	15	Ret	Ret	6	17
18	(United Kingdom) Steven Arnold																									7	5	12
19	(Germany) Frank Krämer											Ret	10	6	9	10	11											10
20	(Switzerland) Ruedi Schurter											13	14	8	13							7	11					7
21	(Switzerland) Jacques Isler	9	Ret	8	Ret																							5
22	(Austria) Franz Binder																	9	10					13	9	Ret	Ret	5
23	(Netherlands) Franc ten Wolde	DNS	DNS	Ret	18	Ret	12	Ret	7	11	13	Ret	Ret															4
24	(Germany) Danny Pfeil																									8	12	3
25	(Austria) Josef Neuhauser	14	14	9	15	11	16	16	Ret					15	DNS	15	21			17	Ret			21	15			2
26	(South Africa) Stephen Watson																									16	9	2
27	(Germany) Martin Santner	10	13	14	20	14	15	11	15					Ret	20	Ret	18	13	13			Ret	DNS	19	13	14	Ret	1
28	(Germany) Marc Hessel									10	12																	1
29	(Germany) Joachim Ryschka	15	12	12	17							12	Ret					Ret	14	19	17	10	Ret	18	14	13	15	1
30	(Italy) Mario Andrea Vismara																							12	10			1
31	(Germany) Dino Lamby																							23	11	12	18	0
32	(Austria) Mercedes Stermitz													17	19	Ret	19	14	16	19	14	11	DNS					0
33	(Finland) Pekka Herva									12	14									18	12							0
34	(Czechoslovakia) Tomas Karhanek									12	18	DNS	DNS			14	20											0
35	(Austria) Franz Wöss			13	19									18	21	17	23	15	15					22	16	18	19	0
36	(Switzerland) Hanspeter Kaufmann													13	Ret													0
37	(Monaco) Thomas Bleiner											15	16															0
38	(Austria) Kurt Fischer													19	22	16	22							DNS	17			0
39	(Italy) Guido Daccò																			16	15							0
40	(Germany) Thomas Wagner					15	17			DNS	DNS	Ret	DNS															0
41	(Germany) Marian Hamprecht																			21	18					17	17	0
42	(Austria) Claudia Kreuzsaler																							20	18	19	20	0
43	(Austria) Günter Aberer																			22	19							0
	(South Africa) Hilton Cowie											Ret	Ret													Ret	Ret	0
	(Germany) Albrecht Trautzburg																			Ret	DNS							0
	(Italy) Renato Prioli													DNQ	Ret													0
	(Austria) Eugen Swoboda													DNQ	DNQ													0
	(Sweden) Peter Aslund							Ret	Ret	DNS	DNS																	0
	(Netherlands) Peter Kox							Ret	Ret																			0
Pos	Driver	ZOL (Belgium)		NÜR1 (Germany)		WUN (Germany)		AVU (Germany)		NÜR2 (Germany)		HOC1 (Germany)		NOR (Germany)		BRN (Czechoslovakia)		DIE (Germany)		NÜR3 (Germany)		SIN (Germany)		NÜR4 (Germany)		HOC2 (Germany)		Points

Colour	Result
Gold	Winner
Silver	Second place
Bronze	Third place
Green	Points classification
Blue	Non-points classification
Blue	Non-classified finish (NC)
Purple	Retired, not classified (Ret)
Red	Did not qualify (DNQ)
Red	Did not pre-qualify (DNPQ)
Black	Disqualified (DSQ)
White	Did not start (DNS)
White	Withdrew (WD)
White	Race cancelled (C)
Blank	Did not practice (DNP)
Blank	Did not arrive (DNA)
Blank	Excluded (EX)

**Bold** - Pole
Italics - Fastest Lap
