= Winkelhock =

Winkelhock is a German surname. Notable people with the surname include:

- Joachim Winkelhock (born 1960), German racing driver
- Manfred Winkelhock (1951–1985), German racing driver
- Markus Winkelhock (born 1980), German racing driver
- Thomas Winkelhock (born 1968), German racing driver
