= Jörg Müller =

German racing driver (born 1969)

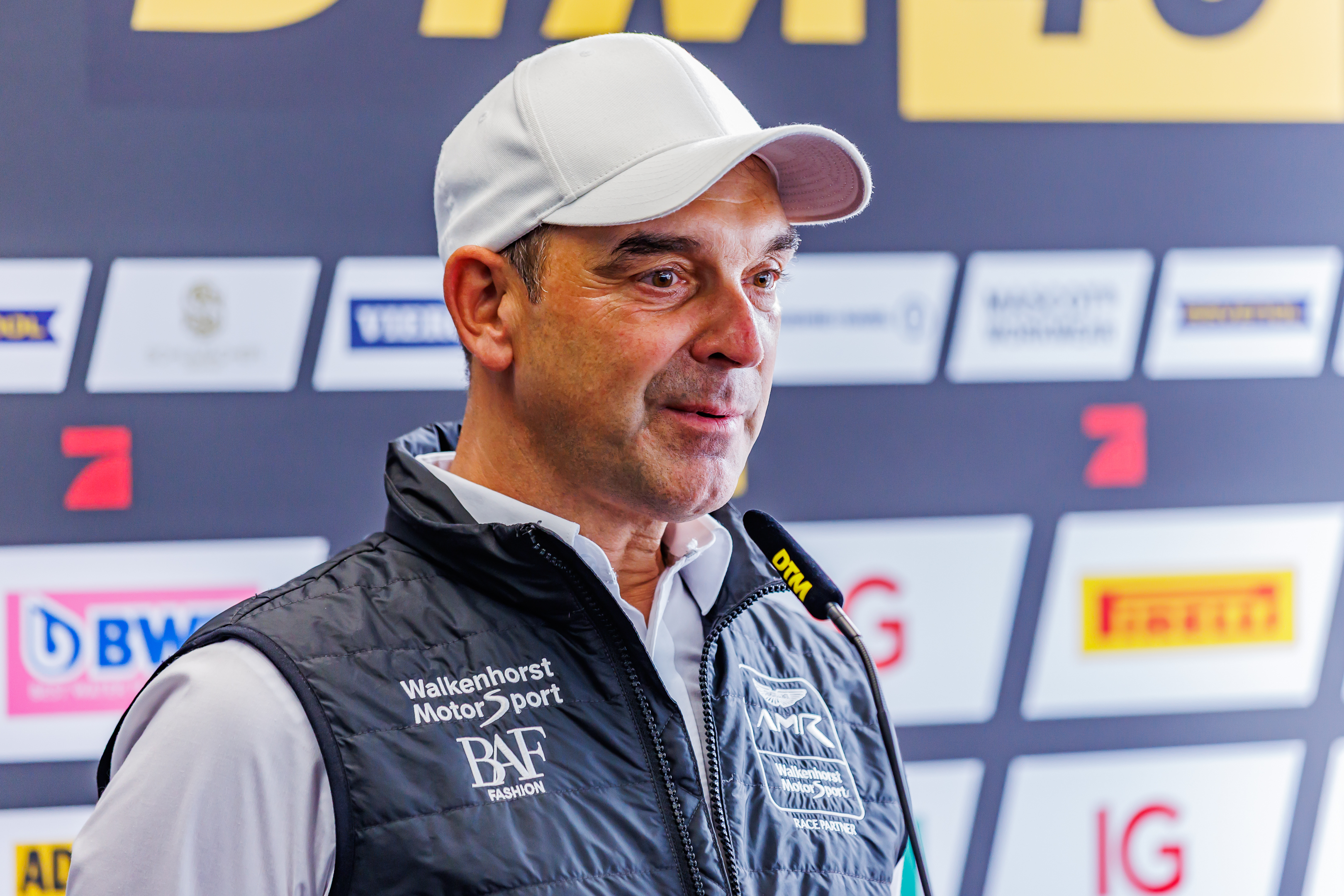
- Müller in 2024
- Nationality: (Germany) German
- Born: 3 September 1969 (age 57) Kerkrade, Netherlands
- Relatives: Ewald Müller (father)

Super GT (GT300) career
- Debut season: 2014
- Current team: BMW Team Studie
- Categorisation: FIA Platinum (until 2019); FIA Gold (2020–)
- Car number: 7
- Former teams: BMW Team Schnitzer, BMW Team Germany, BMW Team RLL, Schubert Motorsport, Marc VDS Racing Team
- Starts: 32
- Wins: 0
- Poles: 0
- Fastest laps: 1
- Best finish: 3rd in 2014

Previous series
- 1988 1989 1989 1990–94 1991 1991 1994 1995–96 1996 1997–2000 1998 1999–2001 2002–2004 2005–2009 2010–2011 2012 2013: German Formula Ford; German Formula Opel; European Formula Ford 1600; German F3; British F3; French F3; Formula One testing German Supertouring; International F3000; Formula One testing FIA GT; ALMS; ETCC; WTCC; ILMC; ALMS; ADAC GT Masters

Championship titles
- 1989 1989 1994 1996 2001: German Formula Opel; European Formula Ford 1600; German F3; International F3000; ALMS (GT)

24 Hours of Le Mans career
- Years: 1997 - 1999, 2010
- Teams: Nissan Motorsport; Porsche AG; BMW Motorsport
- Best finish: 2nd (1998)
- Class wins: 0

Jörg Müller (German pronunciation: [ˈjœʁk ˈmʏlɐ], Dutch: [ˈjʏr(ə)k ˈmʏlər]; born 3 September 1969) is a Dutch-born German BMW factory driver.

== Racing career ==
Born in Kerkrade, Netherlands, Müller won the titles in 1989 German Formula Opel Lotus Challenge and in 1989 European Formula Ford 1600.

The 1994, German Formula Three Champion won a Supertouring car race for BMW in 1995 and the 1995-1996 Spa 24 Hours as well as the 1996 Formula 3000 Championship for team RSM Helmut Marko Lola-Zytek. He also won the prestigious Macau Grand Prix in 1993.

From 1997 to 1998, Müller was a Formula One test driver for Arrows and Sauber-Petronas, before joining the BMW-WilliamsF1 project to do tests for engines and Michelin tyres from 1999 to 2001. He never managed to race in Formula One though, and was the first F3000 champion since the series' inception to fail to make the step up.

From 1997 to 2000, Müller was also busy in sportscar racing, with drives for Nissan (and Porsche in the FIA GT Championship, 1998). He was part of the team that was winning the 24 Hours of Daytona in a Porsche 911 GT1 and leading the 1999 24 Hours of Le Mans for 18 hours in a BMW V12 LMR.

In 2000 (BMW V12 LMR) and 2001 (BMW M3 GTR V8), Müller was successful in the American Le Mans Series (ALMS) for BMW and Schnitzer Motorsport, having won the 2001 ALMS GT title.

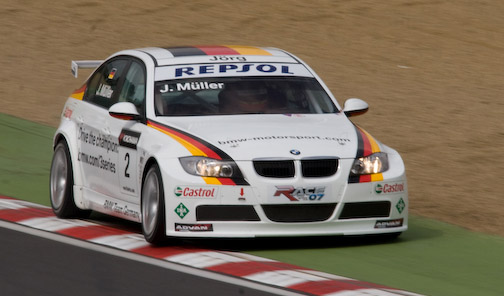
Müller driving the BMW 320si WTCC car at Brands Hatch in 2008.

From the 2002 to 2005 season, Müller drove BMW 3 Series (E46) touring cars for the Schnitzer-operated works squad BMW Team Deutschland (also called BMW Team Germany) in the FIA European Touring Car Championship (now WTCC), and used BMW 3 Series (E90) touring cars in seasons after 2005. From 2002, he and Dirk Müller participated in the ETCC and WTCC until the latter left for the ALMS after 2006.

The 2004 24 Hours Nürburgring was won by both Müllers (and Hans-Joachim Stuck) with the BMW M3 GTR V8 that had been raced successfully in the 2001 ALMS. In 2005, the Müllers finished second behind their sister car.

In 2006, Müller finished second in the World Touring Car Championship (WTCC). The following year, in Dirk Müller's absence, Augusto Farfus - joining fresh from Alfa Romeo - became Müller's new teammate for the 2007-09 seasons. Müller finished seventh in the 2007 championship, seventh again in 2008, and sixth in 2009.

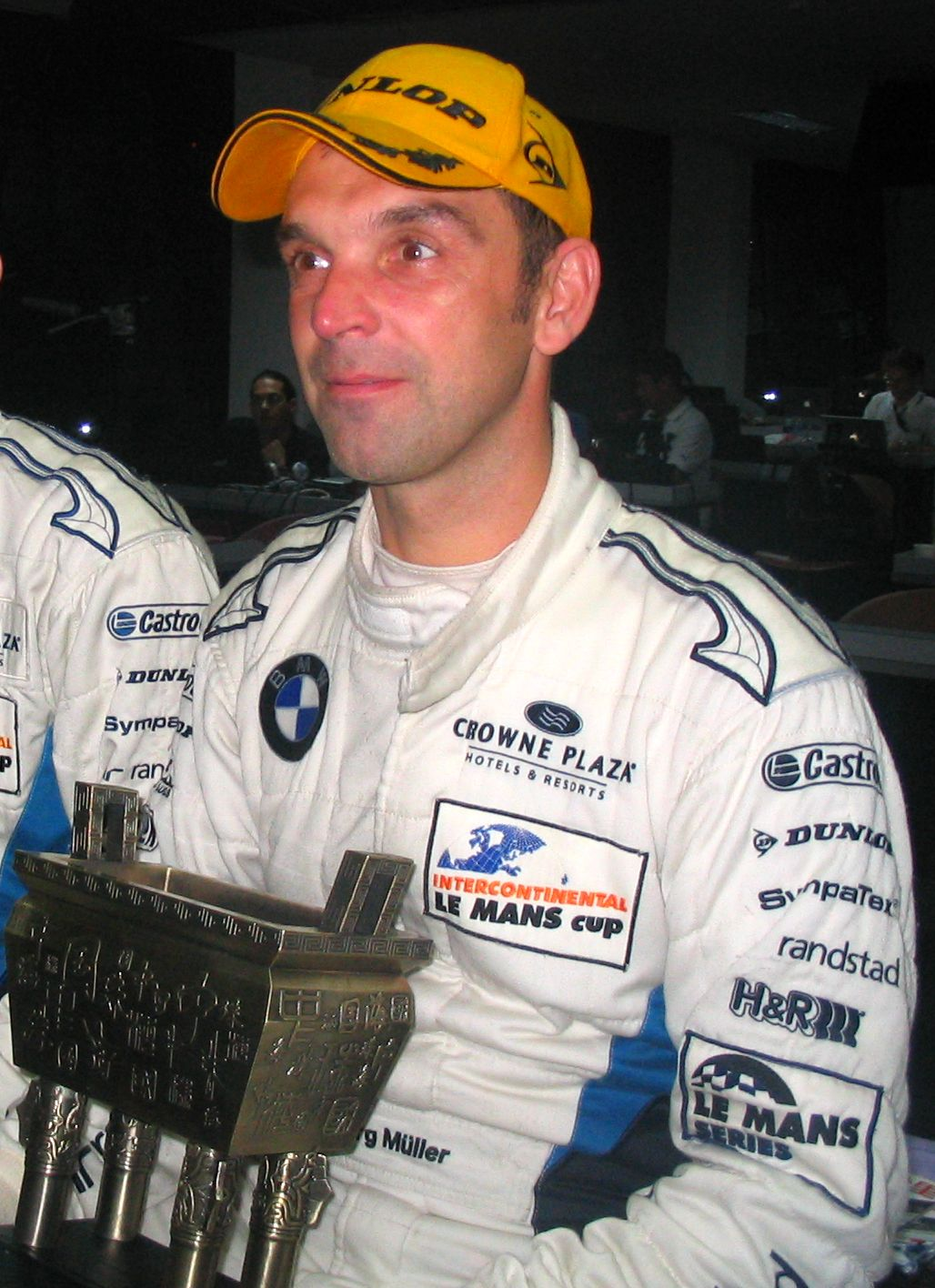
Müller with the 2010 1000 km of Zhuhai GT2 winners' trophy.

For 2010, BMW reduced its WTCC squad down to two cars. Müller left the WTCC and became part of BMW's Le Mans Series team. This move brought immediate success in the form of an overall win for Müller at the 24 Hours Nürburgring in an M3 GT2. This victory was shared with Augusto Farfus, Pedro Lamy, and Uwe Alzen. In November Müller teamed up with Dirk Werner at the Intercontinental Le Mans Cup and the pair won the 1000km of Zhuhai for BMW Team Schnitzer.

During the 2011 ILMC season, Müller repeated his victory in Zhuhai, finishing first in class in the 6 Hours of Zhuhai. He shared this victory with Augusto Farfus. Also, in the same year, Müller participated in that year's Nürburgring 24 Hour Race as defending champion in the BMW M3 GT, with exactly the same lineup from 2010 entered by BMW Team Schnitzer with (Farfus, Alzen, Lamy). The team placed second at the end of the race.

With BMW's factory effort entirely on the DTM for the 2012 programme, and their indefinite suspension of Le Mans efforts, Müller returned to the American Le Mans Series sharing a BMW with Bill Auberlen. He claimed a win and three podiums, plus two fourth-place finishes, and finished sixth overall.

For 2013, Müller joined Schubert Motorsport for a season in the ADAC GT Masters. He finished 17th overall, claiming a podium at Nürburgring, and given an accident he had at Spa-Francorchamps. Because of this accident, however, he was unable to attend that year's running of the Nürburgring 24 Hours. Claudia Hürtgen took his place. Müller also made a guest appearance at that year's Suzuka 1000 km, helping GSR & Studie to a second-place finish, but was later disqualified during the post-race inspection. That year, it was revealed BMW Motorsport had not retained Müller with a factory contract; but as he was unable to find a new employer, BMW subsequently provided the veteran with a new contract. This ensured Müller would continue his career as a works driver.

In 2014, Müller joined BMW Sports Trophy Team Studie for a full season of the Super GT Championship, racing a BMW Z4 GT3. While Müller and teammate Seiji Ara were unable to pull off a single victory in the season, despite several close battles for P1 on some occasions, their efforts were enough to land them in third place in the overall standings. Augusto Farfus helped Müller and Ara secure a podium at the 1000 km race in Suzuka. Müller also made appearances with BMW Sports Trophy Team Marc VDS at the Nürburgring 24 Hour Race and the Spa 24 Hours.

Müller's 2015 season started shortly at the turn of the year, driving for the MPB Racing Team's BMW M235i Racing in the Dubai 24 Hour as a BMW works driver. However, a braking problem with the car resulting in a repair lasting at least two hours cost the team any chance of a class victory. Nevertheless, the MPB Racing Team's BMW still set the fastest lap in class. In addition to his outings with BMW Sports Trophy Team Studie, he joined BMW Sports Trophy Team Marc VDS again for another running at the 24 Hours Nürburgring. However, a pit fire with his car cost the team seven minutes, and by the end of the race, Müller finished in an impressive fourth place (the sister car finished second), with fellow works drivers Augusto Farfus, Nicky Catsburg, and Dirk Adorf. On February 5, 2015, Müller was given the honour of driving the BMW M6 GT3 on first roll-out at the BMW factory in Dingolfing, in addition to providing crucial support in the development stage of the car. The BMW M6 GT3 being the successor to the Z4 GT3.

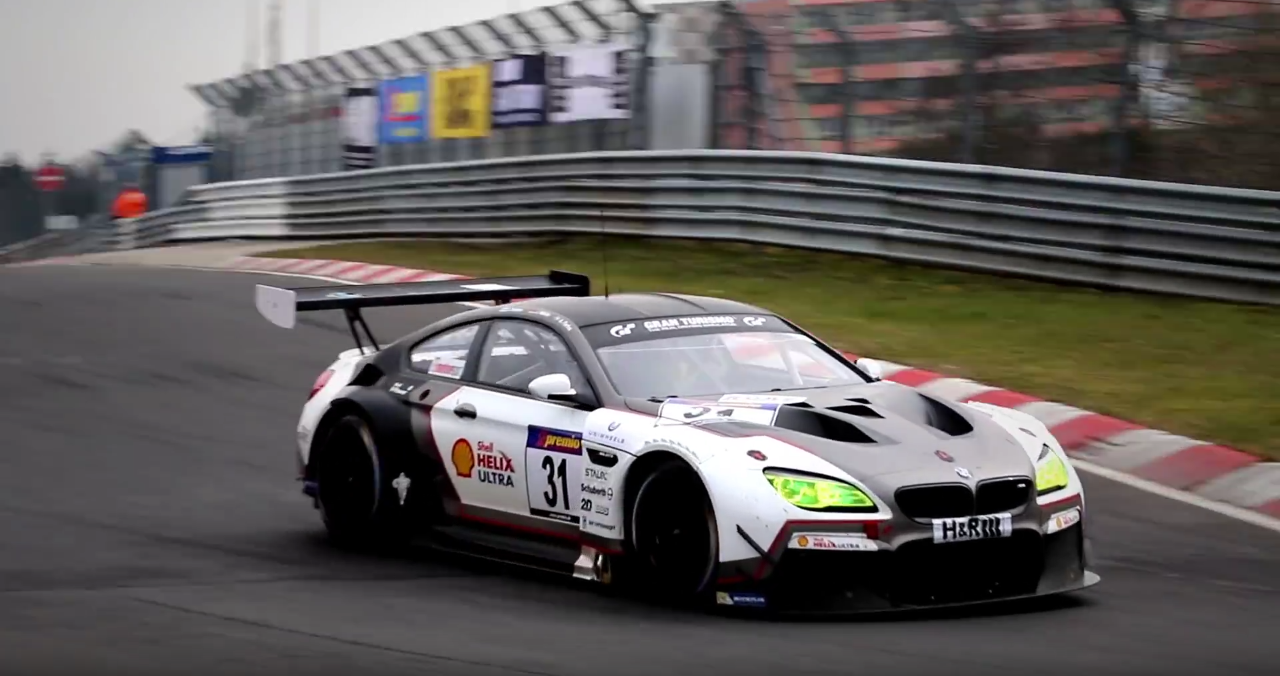
The Schubert BMW M6 GT3 which Müller drove in the 2016 VLN season and the Nürburgring 24-hour race.

In 2016, Müller continued participating in what would be his third season in the Super GT Championship, alongside BMW Team Studie (renamed from BMW Sports Trophy Team Studie). As usual, he appeared at the 24 Hours Nürburgring; rejoining Schubert Motorsport in a BMW M6 GT3. On May 14, Müller, alongside DTM champion Marco Wittmann and BMW Motorsport Junior Jesse Krohn, recorded the BMW M6 GT3's first ever win, finishing first overall in a VLN 4-hour race. During the 24-hour race with Wittmann, Krohn, and Augusto Farfus, Müller was leading the field until his M6 GT3 suffered from a broken powertrain. The car was subsequently sent to the Schubert garage for extensive repairs lasting over twelve hours and by the end of the race finished 120th overall. For the remainder of the 2016 season, in addition to Super GT, Müller continued to participate in the VLN. There, he - with Jesse Krohn and Victor Bouveng - recorded three podium finishes (two third place finishes, one second place) and a fifth place finish in a Walkenhorst Motorsport M6 GT3, and a second place finish in a BMW Team RBM-operated M6 GT3 in the last race.

The start of the 2017 season saw Müller join Schubert Motorsport again for an outing at the Dubai 24 Hour in a still-developing BMW M4 GT4. For BMW Motorsport's purposes, the race was treated as a test and development session for the new car with Müller, fellow works driver Jens Klingmann, and BMW Motorsport Junior Ricky Collard at the wheel. The result was a flawless race for the team with the BMW M4 GT4 finishing 25th place overall (fifth in the SPX class) having started from 49th on the grid. The following month saw Müller join BMW Motorsport Juniors Ricky Collard, Nico Menzel, and Joel Eriksson as a mentor in a BMW M6 GT3 with Walkenhorst Motorsport for the Bathurst 12 Hour, but unfortunately was unable to participate in the race itself as the car crashed during qualifying. The month after, it was announced Müller would rejoin BMW Team Studie again for a fourth season in the Super GT Championship. At the 24 Hours Nürburgring, he was responsible for driving both of the Schubert-entered M6 GT3 and finished 11th and 12th overall. As well, he continued participating in the VLN picking up a win for Falken Motorsports in an M6 GT3.

== Family ==
Müller is the son of former European Karting-champion Ewald Müller. He is not related to former team-mate Dirk Müller or to French driver Yvan Muller.

Müller currently resides in Monaco. He has a younger brother, Rainer, and an older sister, Marion.

== Racing record ==
=== Complete German Formula Three results ===
(key) (Races in bold indicate pole position) (Races in italics indicate fastest lap)

| Year | Entrant | Engine | Class | 1 | 2 | 3 | 4 | 5 | 6 | 7 | 8 | 9 | 10 | 11 | 12 | 13 | 14 | 15 | 16 | 17 | 18 | 19 | 20 | 21 | 22 | 23 | 24 | 25 | 26 | DC | Pts | Ref |
|---|---|---|---|---|---|---|---|---|---|---|---|---|---|---|---|---|---|---|---|---|---|---|---|---|---|---|---|---|---|---|---|---|
| 1990 | Bongers Motorsport | VW | A | ZOL; Ret | HOC; 2 | NÜR; 8 | AVU; 5 | WUN; 5 | NOR; 6 | ÖST; 12 | **DIE**; 2 | NÜR; 12 | NÜR; 9 | HOC; 5 | | | | | | | | | | | | | | | | 5th | 65 | |
| 1991 | Bongers Motorsport | VW | A | ZOL; 2 | HOC; 4 | NÜR; 8 | AVU; 14 | MST; 3 | WUN; Ret | NOR; 4 | DIE; Ret | NÜR; 4 | NÜR; 4 | HOC; 2 | | | | | | | | | | | | | | | | 4th | 85 | |
| 1992 | Bongers Motorsport | Opel | A | **ZOL**; **1**; 8 | ZOL; 2 Ret | NÜR; 1; 15 | NÜR; 2; 2 | WUN; 1 Ret | WUN; 2; 3 | AVU; 1; 1 | **AVU**; **2** Ret | NÜR; 1 Ret | NÜR; 2; 8 | HOC; 1; 6 | HOC; 2; 4 | NOR; 1; 7 | NOR; 2; 5 | BRN; 1; 11 | BRN; 2; 8 | DIE; 1 Ret | DIE; 2; 6 | NÜR; 1 Ret | NÜR; 2; 6 | ALE; 1 DSQ | ALE; 2; 12 | NÜR; 1; 24 | NÜR; 2 Ret | HOC; 1; 5 | HOC; 2; 7 | 7th | 108 | |
| 1993 | Marko RSM | Fiat | A | ZOL; 1 | ZOL; 2 | HOC; 1 | HOC; 2 | NÜR; 1 | NÜR; 2 | WUN; 1 | WUN; 2 | NOR; 1; 6 | NOR; 2 Ret | **DIE**; **1**; 1 | **DIE**; **2** Ret | NÜR; 1; 6 | NÜR; 2; 7 | ALE; 1 | ALE; 2 | AVU; 1 DNS | AVU; 2; 6 | HOC; 1; 4 | HOC; 2; 7 | | | | | | | 9th | 56 | |
| 1994 | Marko RSM | Fiat | A | **ZOL**; **1** C | **ZOL**; **2**; 1 | HOC; 1; 4 | HOC; 2; 3 | NÜR; 1; 1 | **NÜR**; **2**; 1 | WUN; 1; 14 | WUN; 2; 1 | **NOR**; **1**; 1 | **NOR**; **2**; 2 | DIE; 1; 1 | **DIE**; **2**; 1 | NÜR; 1; 6 | NÜR; 2; 5 | **AVU**; **1**; 1 | **AVU**; **2**; 1 | ALE; 1; 2 | ALE; 2; 1 | HOC; 1; 1 | **HOC**; **2**; 7 | | | | | | | 1st | 290 | |

=== Complete Super Tourenwagen Cup results ===
(key) (Races in bold indicate pole position) (Races in italics indicate fastest lap)

| Year | Team | Car | 1 | 2 | 3 | 4 | 5 | 6 | 7 | 8 | 9 | 10 | 11 | 12 | 13 | 14 | 15 | 16 | 17 | 18 | DC | Pts |
|---|---|---|---|---|---|---|---|---|---|---|---|---|---|---|---|---|---|---|---|---|---|---|
| 1995 | BMW Team Isert | BMW 318is | ZOL; 1; 13 | ZOL; 2; 10 | SPA; 1; 6 | SPA; 2; 3 | ÖST; 1; 13 | ÖST; 2 Ret | HOC; 1; 11 | HOC; 2 Ret | NÜR; 1 | NÜR; 2 | SAL; 1; 10 | SAL; 2; 12 | AVU; 1; 16 | AVU; 2 Ret | NÜR; 1; 11 | NÜR; 2 Ret | | | 12th | 148 |
| 1996 | BMW Team Bigazzi | BMW 320i | ZOL; 1 | ZOL; 2 | ASS; 1; 4 | ASS; 2; 4 | HOC; 1; 9 | HOC; 2; 14 | SAC; 1; 18 | SAC; 2; 9 | WUN; 1; 11 | WUN; 2; 7 | ZWE; 1 Ret | ZWE; 2; 16 | SAL; 1 | SAL; 2 | AVU; 1 | AVU; 2 | NÜR; 1 | NÜR; 2 | 16th | 152 |

=== Complete International Formula 3000 results ===
(key) (Races in bold indicate pole position; races in italics indicate fastest lap.)

| Year | Entrant | 1 | 2 | 3 | 4 | 5 | 6 | 7 | 8 | 9 | 10 | DC | Points |
|---|---|---|---|---|---|---|---|---|---|---|---|---|---|
| 1996 | RSM Marko | NÜR; 2 | PAU; 1 | PER; 2 | HOC; 2 | SIL; Ret | SPA; 1 | MAG; 3 | **EST**; 2 | MUG; 2 | **HOC**; Ret | **1st** | **52** |

=== Complete American Le Mans Series results ===
| Year | Entrant | Class | Chassis | Engine | Tyres | 1 | 2 | 3 | 4 | 5 | 6 | 7 | 8 | 9 | 10 | 11 | 12 | Rank | Points | Ref |
|---|---|---|---|---|---|---|---|---|---|---|---|---|---|---|---|---|---|---|---|---|
| 1999 | BMW Motorsport | LMP | BMW V12 LMR | BMW S70 6.0 L V12 | M | SEB ovr:1 cls:1 | ATL | MOS | SON | POR | PET ovr:3 cls:3 | LAG | LSV | | | | | 21st | 52 | |
| 2000 | BMW Motorsport | LMP | BMW V12 LMR | BMW S70 6.0 L V12 | M | SEB ovr:3 cls:3 | CHA ovr:1 cls:1 | SIL ovr:1 cls:1 | NÜR ovr:2 cls:2 | SON ovr:3 cls:3 | MOS ovr:2 cls:2 | TEX ovr:4 cls:4 | POR ovr:3 cls:3 | PET ovr:5 cls:5 | LAG ovr:3 cls:3 | LSV ovr:26 cls:9 | ADE | 5th | 221 | |
| 2001 | BMW Motorsport | GT | BMW M3 | BMW 3.2L I6 | M | TEX ovr:12 cls:5 | | | | | | | | | PET ovr:9 cls:2 | | | **1st** | **191** | |
| 2001 | BMW Motorsport | GT | BMW M3 GTR | BMW 4.0L V8 | M | | SEB ovr:10 cls:3 | DON ovr:Ret cls:Ret | JAR ovr:6 cls:2 | SON ovr:7 cls:1 | POR ovr:10 cls:3 | MOS ovr:10 cls:1 | MOH ovr:14 cls:1 | LAG ovr:9 cls:1 | | | | **1st** | **191** | |
| 2009 | BMW Rahal Letterman Racing | GT2 | BMW M3 GT2 | BMW 4.0 L V8 | D | SEB | STP | LBH | UTA | LRP | MOH | ELK | MOS | PET ovr:9 cls:2 | LAG | | | 27th | 26 | |
| 2012 | BMW Team RLL | GT | BMW M3 GT2 | BMW 4.0 L V8 | D | SEB ovr:22 cls:4 | LBH ovr:29 cls:10 | LAG ovr:11 cls:3 | LRP ovr:14 cls:6 | MOS ovr:16 cls:7 | MOH ovr:14 cls:3 | ELK ovr:13 cls:1 | BAL ovr:12 cls:8 | VIR ovr:11 cls:4 | PET ovr:14 cls:3 | | | 6th | 107 | |

=== Complete European Touring Car Championship results ===
(key) (Races in bold indicate pole position) (Races in italics indicate fastest lap)

| Year | Team | Car | 1 | 2 | 3 | 4 | 5 | 6 | 7 | 8 | 9 | 10 | 11 | 12 | 13 | 14 | 15 | 16 | 17 | 18 | 19 | 20 | DC | Pts |
|---|---|---|---|---|---|---|---|---|---|---|---|---|---|---|---|---|---|---|---|---|---|---|---|---|
| 2002 | BMW Team Deutschland | BMW 320i | MAG; 1; 5 | MAG; 2; 5 | SIL; 1; 3 | SIL; 2; 8 | BRN; 1; 5 | BRN; 2; 4 | JAR; 1; 3 | JAR; 2; 4 | AND; 1; 4 | AND; 2; 1 | OSC; 1; 2 | OSC; 2; 2 | SPA; 1; 2 | SPA; 2; 1 | PER; 1; 4 | PER; 2; 3 | DON; 1; 5 | DON; 2; 1 | EST; 1; 4 | EST; 2; 1 | **2nd** | **93** |
| 2003 | BMW Team Deutschland | BMW 320i | VAL; 1; 4 | VAL; 2; 2 | MAG; 1; 1 | MAG; 2; 1 | PER; 1; 6 | PER; 2 Ret | BRN; 1 DSQ | BRN; 2; 16† | DON; 1; 4 | DON; 2; 1 | SPA; 1; 3 | SPA; 2; 4 | AND; 1; 4 | AND; 2; 4 | **OSC**; **1**; 1 | OSC; 2; 4 | EST; 1; 4 | EST; 2; 5 | **MNZ**; **1**; 11† | MNZ; 2; 1 | **2nd** | **106** |
| 2004 | BMW Team Deutschland | BMW 320i | MNZ; 1; 4 | MNZ; 2; 1 | VAL; 1; 6 | VAL; 2; 5 | **MAG**; **1**; 2 | MAG; 2; 4 | HOC; 1; 4 | HOC; 2; 1 | BRN; 1; 7 | BRN; 2; 4 | DON; 1; 2 | DON; 2 Ret | **SPA**; **1**; 2 | SPA; 2; 1 | IMO; 1; 7 | IMO; 2 Ret | OSC; 1; 4 | OSC; 2 Ret | DUB; 1; 6 | DUB; 2; 12 | 4th | 93 |

† — Did not finish the race, but was classified as he completed over 90% of the race distance.

=== Complete World Touring Car Championship results ===
(key) (Races in bold indicate pole position) (Races in italics indicate fastest lap)

| Year | Team | Car | 1 | 2 | 3 | 4 | 5 | 6 | 7 | 8 | 9 | 10 | 11 | 12 | 13 | 14 | 15 | 16 | 17 | 18 | 19 | 20 | 21 | 22 | 23 | 24 | DC | Points |
|---|---|---|---|---|---|---|---|---|---|---|---|---|---|---|---|---|---|---|---|---|---|---|---|---|---|---|---|---|
| 2005 | BMW Team Deutschland | BMW 320i | ITA; 1; 29 | ITA; 2; 4 | **FRA**; **1**; 1 | FRA; 2; 1 | GBR; 1; 9 | GBR; 2; 7 | SMR; 1; 27 | SMR; 2; 12 | MEX; 1 DNS | MEX; 2 DNS | BEL; 1; 3 | BEL; 2; 16 | GER; 1; 3 | GER; 2; 3 | TUR; 1 Ret | TUR; 2; 12 | ESP; 1; 5 | ESP; 2; 1 | MAC; 1 Ret | MAC; 2 DNS | | | | | 5th | 59 |
| 2006 | BMW Team Deutschland | BMW 320si | ITA; 1; 28 | ITA; 2; 25† | FRA; 1; 2 | FRA; 2; 2 | GBR; 1 Ret | GBR; 2 Ret | GER; 1; 7 | GER; 2; 1 | BRA; 1; 9 | BRA; 2; 7 | MEX; 1; 19 | MEX; 2; 15 | CZE; 1; 1 | CZE; 2; 4 | TUR; 1 Ret | TUR; 2; 8 | ESP; 1; 6 | ESP; 2; 1 | MAC; 1; 6 | MAC; 2; 1 | | | | | **2nd** | **72** |
| 2007 | BMW Team Germany | BMW 320si | **BRA**; **1**; 1 | BRA; 2; 3 | NED; 1; 10 | NED; 2; 3 | ESP; 1; 8 | **ESP**; **2**; 2 | FRA; 1; 11 | FRA; 2; 10 | CZE; 1; 2 | CZE; 2; 1 | POR; 1; 8 | **POR**; **2**; 2 | SWE; 1; 15 | SWE; 2; 10 | GER; 1; 4 | GER; 2 Ret | GBR; 1; 14 | GBR; 2; 7 | ITA; 1; 16 | ITA; 2; 14 | MAC; 1; 13 | MAC; 2; 20† | | | 7th | 66 |
| 2008 | BMW Team Germany | BMW 320si | BRA; 1; 3 | BRA; 2; 4 | MEX; 1; 14 | MEX; 2; 12 | ESP; 1; 5 | ESP; 2; 4 | FRA; 1; 9 | FRA; 2; 13 | CZE; 1; 5 | CZE; 2; 7 | POR; 1; 9 | POR; 2; 7 | GBR; 1; 1 | GBR; 2; 4 | GER; 1; 26 | GER; 2; 9 | EUR; 1; 8 | **EUR**; **2**; 2 | ITA; 1; 9 | ITA; 2; 10 | JPN; 1; 2 | JPN; 2 Ret | MAC; 1; 10 | MAC; 2 Ret | 7th | 60 |
| 2009 | BMW Team Germany | BMW 320si | BRA; 1 NC | BRA; 2; 5 | MEX; 1; 5 | MEX; 2; 13 | MAR; 1; 8 | **MAR**; **2**; 4 | FRA; 1; 3 | FRA; 2; 18 | ESP; 1; 6 | ESP; 2; 2 | CZE; 1; 2 | CZE; 2; 7 | POR; 1; 11 | POR; 2; 8 | GBR; 1; 6 | GBR; 2; 2 | GER; 1 Ret | GER; 2; 4 | ITA; 1 NC | ITA; 2; 15 | JPN; 1; 2 | JPN; 2; 16 | MAC; 1; 7 | MAC; 2; 2 | 6th | 76 |

† — Did not finish the race, but was classified as he completed over 90% of the race distance.

=== Complete Super GT results ===
(key) (Races in bold indicate pole position) (Races in italics indicate fastest lap)

| Year | Team | Car | Class | 1 | 2 | 3 | 4 | 5 | 6 | 7 | 8 | 9 | DC | Points |
|---|---|---|---|---|---|---|---|---|---|---|---|---|---|---|
| 2013 | GSR & Studie with Team Ukyo | BMW Z4 GT3 | GT300 | OKA | FUJ | SEP | SUG | SUZ; DSQ | FUJ | FUJ | AUT | MOT | NC | 0 |
| 2014 | BMW Sports Trophy Team Studie | BMW Z4 GT3 | GT300 | OKA; 2 | FUJ; 4 | AUT; 15 | SUG; 8 | FUJ; 7 | SUZ; 3 | BUR; 2 | MOT; 7 | | 3rd | 62 |
| 2015 | BMW Sports Trophy Team Studie | BMW Z4 GT3 | GT300 | OKA; Ret | FUJ; 6 | CHA; 3 | FUJ; Ret | SUZ; 2 | SUG; 19 | AUT; 3 | MOT; 9 | | 7th | 47 |
| 2016 | BMW Team Studie | BMW M6 GT3 | GT300 | OKA; 3 | FUJ; 24 | SUG; 10 | FUJ; 20 | SUZ; DNS | CHA; 6 | MOT; 15 | MOT; 12 | | 15th | 17 |
| 2017 | BMW Team Studie | BMW M6 GT3 | GT300 | OKA; 13 | FUJ; 7 | AUT; 4 | SUG; 16 | FUJ; 6 | SUZ; 11 | CHA; 10 | MOT; 13 | | 15th | 18 |

=== 24 Hours of Le Mans results ===
| Year | Team | Co-Drivers | Car | Class | Laps | Pos. | Class Pos. |
|---|---|---|---|---|---|---|---|
| 1997 | (Japan) Nissan Motorsport (United Kingdom) TWR | (United Kingdom) Martin Brundle (South Africa) Wayne Taylor | Nissan R390 GT1 | GT1 | 139 | DNF | DNF |
| 1998 | (Germany) Porsche AG | (Germany) Uwe Alzen (France) Bob Wollek | Porsche 911 GT1-98 | GT1 | 350 | **2nd** | **2nd** |
| 1999 | (Germany) Team BMW Motorsport | (Denmark) Tom Kristensen (Finland) JJ Lehto | BMW V12 LMR | LMP | 304 | DNF | DNF |
| 2010 | (Germany) BMW Motorsport | (Brazil) Augusto Farfus (Germany) Uwe Alzen | BMW M3 GT2 | GT2 | 320 | 19th | 6th |
| 2011 | (Germany) BMW Motorsport | (Brazil) Augusto Farfus (Germany) Dirk Werner | BMW M3 GT2 | GTE; Pro | 276 | DNF | DNF |

Sporting positions
| Preceded by Laurent Aïello | Monaco Formula Three Support; Race Winner; 1991 | Succeeded by Marco Werner |
| Preceded by Rickard Rydell | Macau Grand Prix; Winner; 1993 | Succeeded by Sascha Maassen |
| Preceded by Jos Verstappen | German Formula Three Champion; 1994 | Succeeded by Norberto Fontana |
| Preceded by Vincenzo Sospiri | International Formula 3000; Champion; 1996 | Succeeded by Ricardo Zonta |
| Preceded by Dirk Müller | American Le Mans Series; GT Champion; 2001 | Succeeded by Lucas Luhr; Sascha Maassen |
