= 2000 Grand Prix of Las Vegas =

The 2000 Grand Prix of Las Vegas presented by enjoythedrive.com was the eleventh round of the 2000 American Le Mans Series season. It took place at Las Vegas Motor Speedway, Nevada, on October 29, 2000.

== Official results ==
Class winners in bold.

Pos	Class	No	Team	Drivers	Chassis	Tyre	Laps
Pos	Class	No	Team	Drivers	Engine	Tyre	Laps
1	**LMP**	**78**	**(Germany) Audi Sport North America**	**(Germany) Frank Biela (Italy) Emanuele Pirro**	**Audi R8**	MI	**129**
1	**LMP**	**78**	**(Germany) Audi Sport North America**	**(Germany) Frank Biela (Italy) Emanuele Pirro**	**Audi 3.6L Turbo V8**	MI	**129**
2	LMP	77	(Germany) Audi Sport North America	(Italy) Rinaldo Capello (United Kingdom) Allan McNish	Audi R8	MI	129
2	LMP	77	(Germany) Audi Sport North America	(Italy) Rinaldo Capello (United Kingdom) Allan McNish	Audi 3.6L Turbo V8	MI	129
3	LMP	43	(Germany) BMW Motorsport (Germany) Schnitzer Motorsport	(France) Jean-Marc Gounon (United States) Bill Auberlen	BMW V12 LMR	MI	128
3	LMP	43	(Germany) BMW Motorsport (Germany) Schnitzer Motorsport	(France) Jean-Marc Gounon (United States) Bill Auberlen	BMW S70 6.0L V12	MI	128
4	LMP	0	(Italy) Team Rafanelli SRL	(Italy) Mimmo Schiattarella (Belgium) Didier de Radiguès	Lola B2K/10	MI	125
4	LMP	0	(Italy) Team Rafanelli SRL	(Italy) Mimmo Schiattarella (Belgium) Didier de Radiguès	Judd (Rafanelli) GV4 4.0L V10	MI	125
5	LMP	36	(United States) Johansson-Matthews Racing	(Sweden) Stefan Johansson (United Kingdom) Guy Smith	Reynard 2KQ-LM	Y	125
5	LMP	36	(United States) Johansson-Matthews Racing	(Sweden) Stefan Johansson (United Kingdom) Guy Smith	Judd GV4 4.0L V10	Y	125
6	LMP	1	(United States) Panoz Motor Sports	(Australia) David Brabham (Denmark) Jan Magnussen	Panoz LMP-1 Roadster-S	MI	123
6	LMP	1	(United States) Panoz Motor Sports	(Australia) David Brabham (Denmark) Jan Magnussen	Élan 6L8 6.0L V8	MI	123
7	**GTS**	**91**	**(France) Viper Team Oreca**	**(Monaco) Olivier Beretta (Austria) Karl Wendlinger**	**Dodge Viper GTS-R**	MI	**120**
7	**GTS**	**91**	**(France) Viper Team Oreca**	**(Monaco) Olivier Beretta (Austria) Karl Wendlinger**	**Dodge 8.0L V10**	MI	**120**
8	GTS	92	(France) Viper Team Oreca	(United States) Tommy Archer (United States) David Donohue	Dodge Viper GTS-R	MI	120
8	GTS	92	(France) Viper Team Oreca	(United States) Tommy Archer (United States) David Donohue	Dodge 8.0L V10	MI	120
9	GTS	4	(United States) Corvette Racing	(United Kingdom) Justin Bell (United States) Chris Kneifel	Chevrolet Corvette C5-R	G	119
9	GTS	4	(United States) Corvette Racing	(United Kingdom) Justin Bell (United States) Chris Kneifel	Chevrolet 7.0L V8	G	119
10	GTS	08	(United States) Roock Motorsport North America	(United States) Zak Brown (United States) Vic Rice	Porsche 911 GT2	Y	119
10	GTS	08	(United States) Roock Motorsport North America	(United States) Zak Brown (United States) Vic Rice	Porsche 3.8L Turbo Flat-6	Y	119
11	**GT**	**51**	**(United States) Dick Barbour Racing**	**(Germany) Sascha Maassen (France) Bob Wollek**	**Porsche 911 GT3-R**	MI	**118**
11	**GT**	**51**	**(United States) Dick Barbour Racing**	**(Germany) Sascha Maassen (France) Bob Wollek**	**Porsche 3.6L Flat-6**	MI	**118**
12	LMP	56	(United States) Martin Snow Racing	(United States) Gunnar Jeannette (United States) Martin Snow	Lola B2K/40	D	118
12	LMP	56	(United States) Martin Snow Racing	(United States) Gunnar Jeannette (United States) Martin Snow	Nissan (AER) VQL 3.0L V6	D	118
13	GT	5	(United States) Dick Barbour Racing	(Germany) Dirk Müller (Germany) Lucas Luhr	Porsche 911 GT3-R	MI	117
13	GT	5	(United States) Dick Barbour Racing	(Germany) Dirk Müller (Germany) Lucas Luhr	Porsche 3.6L Flat-6	MI	117
14	GT	7	(United States) Prototype Technology Group	(United States) Boris Said (Germany) Hans Joachim Stuck	BMW M3	Y	116
14	GT	7	(United States) Prototype Technology Group	(United States) Boris Said (Germany) Hans Joachim Stuck	BMW 3.2L I6	Y	116
15	GT	10	(United States) Prototype Technology Group	(United States) Brian Cunningham (Sweden) Niclas Jönsson	BMW M3	Y	116
15	GT	10	(United States) Prototype Technology Group	(United States) Brian Cunningham (Sweden) Niclas Jönsson	BMW 3.2L I6	Y	116
16	GTS	61	(United Kingdom) Chamberlain Motorsport	(Belgium) Didier Defourney (Switzerland) Walter Brun	Chrysler Viper GTS-R	MI	116
16	GTS	61	(United Kingdom) Chamberlain Motorsport	(Belgium) Didier Defourney (Switzerland) Walter Brun	Chrysler 8.0L V10	MI	116
17	GT	70	(Australia) Skea Racing International	(United Kingdom) Johnny Mowlem (United States) David Murry	Porsche 911 GT3-R	P	115
17	GT	70	(Australia) Skea Racing International	(United Kingdom) Johnny Mowlem (United States) David Murry	Porsche 3.6L Flat-6	P	115
18	GT	71	(Australia) Skea Racing International	(United States) Doc Bundy (United Kingdom) Richard Dean	Porsche 911 GT3-R	P	114
18	GT	71	(Australia) Skea Racing International	(United States) Doc Bundy (United Kingdom) Richard Dean	Porsche 3.6L Flat-6	P	114
19	GT	67	(United States) The Racer's Group	(United States) Rick Polk (United States) Tom McGlynn	Porsche 911 GT3-R	P	112
19	GT	67	(United States) The Racer's Group	(United States) Rick Polk (United States) Tom McGlynn	Porsche 3.6L Flat-6	P	112
20	GT	22	(United States) Alex Job Racing	(United States) Grady Willingham (United States) Kimberly Hiskey	Porsche 911 GT3-R	MI	112
20	GT	22	(United States) Alex Job Racing	(United States) Grady Willingham (United States) Kimberly Hiskey	Porsche 3.6L Flat-6	MI	112
21	GT	30	(United States) White Lightning Racing (United States) Petersen Motorsports	(United States) Cort Wagner (United States) Mike Fitzgerald	Porsche 911 GT3-R	MI	111
21	GT	30	(United States) White Lightning Racing (United States) Petersen Motorsports	(United States) Cort Wagner (United States) Mike Fitzgerald	Porsche 3.6L Flat-6	MI	111
22	GT	6	(United States) Prototype Technology Group	(United States) Peter Cunningham (United States) Johannes van Overbeek	BMW M3	Y	110
22	GT	6	(United States) Prototype Technology Group	(United States) Peter Cunningham (United States) Johannes van Overbeek	BMW 3.2L I6	Y	110
23	GT	69	(Canada) Kyser Racing	(Canada) Kye Wankum (United States) Joe Foster	Porsche 911 GT3-R	P	109
23	GT	69	(Canada) Kyser Racing	(Canada) Kye Wankum (United States) Joe Foster	Porsche 3.6L Flat-6	P	109
24	GT	66	(United States) The Racer's Group	(United States) Kevin Buckler (United States) Philip Collin	Porsche 911 GT3-R	P	109
24	GT	66	(United States) The Racer's Group	(United States) Kevin Buckler (United States) Philip Collin	Porsche 3.6L Flat-6	P	109
25	LMP	37	(United States) Intersport Racing	(United States) Jon Field (United States) Rick Sutherland	Lola B2K/10	Y	108
25	LMP	37	(United States) Intersport Racing	(United States) Jon Field (United States) Rick Sutherland	Judd GV4 4.0L V10	Y	108
26	LMP	42	(Germany) BMW Motorsport (Germany) Schnitzer Motorsport	(Germany) Jörg Müller (Finland) JJ Lehto	BMW V12 LMR	MI	106
26	LMP	42	(Germany) BMW Motorsport (Germany) Schnitzer Motorsport	(Germany) Jörg Müller (Finland) JJ Lehto	BMW S70 6.0L V12	MI	106
27 DNF	LMP	2	(United States) Panoz Motor Sports	(United States) Johnny O'Connell (Japan) Hiroki Katou	Panoz LMP-1 Roadster-S	MI	81
27 DNF	LMP	2	(United States) Panoz Motor Sports	(United States) Johnny O'Connell (Japan) Hiroki Katou	Élan 6L8 6.0L V8	MI	81
28 DNF	LMP	28	(Germany) Konrad Motorsport	(Austria) Franz Konrad (United States) Charles Slater	Lola B2K/10	G	77
28 DNF	LMP	28	(Germany) Konrad Motorsport	(Austria) Franz Konrad (United States) Charles Slater	Ford (Roush) 6.0L V8	G	77
29	GT	23	(United States) Alex Job Racing	(United States) Randy Pobst (Belgium) Bruno Lambert	Porsche 911 GT3-R	MI	77
29	GT	23	(United States) Alex Job Racing	(United States) Randy Pobst (Belgium) Bruno Lambert	Porsche 3.6L Flat-6	MI	77
30 DNF	GTS	3	(United States) Corvette Racing	(United States) Andy Pilgrim (Canada) Ron Fellows	Chevrolet Corvette C5-R	G	70
30 DNF	GTS	3	(United States) Corvette Racing	(United States) Andy Pilgrim (Canada) Ron Fellows	Chevrolet 7.0L V8	G	70
31 DNF	LMP	13	(United States) KnightHawk Racing (United States) Phillips Motorsports	(United States) Mel Hawkins (United States) Steven Knight	Lola B2K/40	A	65
31 DNF	LMP	13	(United States) KnightHawk Racing (United States) Phillips Motorsports	(United States) Mel Hawkins (United States) Steven Knight	Nissan (AER) VQL 3.0L V6	A	65
32 DNF	GT	52	(Germany) Seikel Motorsport	(Canada) Tony Burgess (France) Christophe Bouchut	Porsche 911 GT3-R	Y	53
32 DNF	GT	52	(Germany) Seikel Motorsport	(Canada) Tony Burgess (France) Christophe Bouchut	Porsche 3.6L Flat-6	Y	53
33 DNF	GT	21	(United States) MCR/Aspen Knolls	(United States) Shane Lewis (United States) Darren Law	Porsche 911 GT3-R	P	19
33 DNF	GT	21	(United States) MCR/Aspen Knolls	(United States) Shane Lewis (United States) Darren Law	Porsche 3.6L Flat-6	P	19
34 DNF	GTS	25	(Netherlands) Carsport Holland	(Netherlands) Tom Coronel (Netherlands) Mike Hezemans	Chrysler Viper GTS-R	MI	11
34 DNF	GTS	25	(Netherlands) Carsport Holland	(Netherlands) Tom Coronel (Netherlands) Mike Hezemans	Chrysler 8.0L V10	MI	11

== Statistics ==
- Pole Position - #77 Audi Sport North America - 1:06.628
- Fastest Lap - #77 Audi Sport North America - 1:08.273
- Distance - 467.112 km
- Average Speed - 169.762 km/h

American Le Mans Series
Previous race: 2000 Monterey Sports Car Championships	2000 season	Next race: 2000 Race of a Thousand Years
