= Michael Krumm =

German racing driver

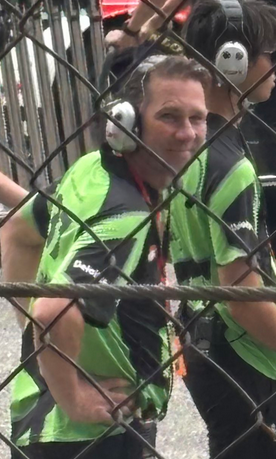
- Krumm at Super GT Malaysia Round in 2025
- Nationality: (Germany) German
- Born: 19 March 1970 (age 56) Reutlingen, Baden-Württemberg, Germany
- Current team: Nismo
- Categorisation: FIA Platinum
- Former teams: Kondo Racing, TOM'S

Previous series
- 1988–1989 1990 1993 1994 1994–1997 1995–2004 1998 1999–2001 2001 2005 2007 2009-2011 2012–2015: German Formula Ford; German Formula Opel Lotus; German Formula Three Championship; All-Japan Formula Three; Japanese F3000 / Formula Nippon; JGTC (excluding 1998); DTM; Formula Nippon; Champ Car; European Le Mans Series; FIA GT Championship; Super GT

Championship titles
- 1989 1990 1994 1997, 2003 2011: German Formula Ford; German Formula Opel Lotus; All-Japan Formula Three; JGTC (GT500); FIA GT1 World Championship

24 Hours of Le Mans career
- Years: 1998 - 1999, 2002, 2005, 2012 - 2013, 2015
- Teams: Nismo/TWR, Audi Sport Team Joest, Rollcentre Racing
- Best finish: 3rd (2002)
- Class wins: 0

Michael Krumm (born 19 March 1970) is a German motorsport executive and former racing driver who acts as the current team manager of TOM'S in Super GT. Krumm is best-known for his successes in the All-Japan GT Championship, where he triumphed in the GT500 class in 1997 and 2003 for TOM'S and Nismo, respectively. He also won the FIA GT1 World Championship in 2011.

Having begun his career in German lower formulae, Krumm went to Japan in 1994 after attaining numerous wins in German Formula Three. That year, he would win the Japanese Formula Three title and moved into Japanese F3000, where he remained intermittently for the next eight years. Krumm won races in JTCC but it was the All-Japan GT Championship, later known as Super GT, where the German would find his calling: after winning a race in his debut season, Krumm won the GT500 class title driving a Toyota Supra alongside Pedro de la Rosa in 1997. Following a year in the Super Tourenwagen Cup, he became a Nissan factory driver, for whom he raced for ten successive seasons, winning the 2003 title together with Satoshi Motoyama.

At the start of the 2010s, Krumm spent two seasons in the FIA GT1 World Championship, where he and Lucas Luhr won the 2011 title driving for JR Motorsports. Krumm returned to Super GT in 2012, remaining until 2015, when he won his final race at Fuji for Kondo Racing before retiring from full-time competition.

Krumm has attained minor success at the 24 Hours of Le Mans, being part of the third-placed Audi R8 lineup in a podium lockout for the German brand at the 2002 race, before finishing on the LMP2 podium in 2013.

== Biography ==
Born in Reutlingen, Krumm married Japanese tennis player Kimiko Date on 1 December 2001 at St. Mary's Cathedral, Tokyo. Kimiko Date announced their divorce on Twitter on September 26, 2016.

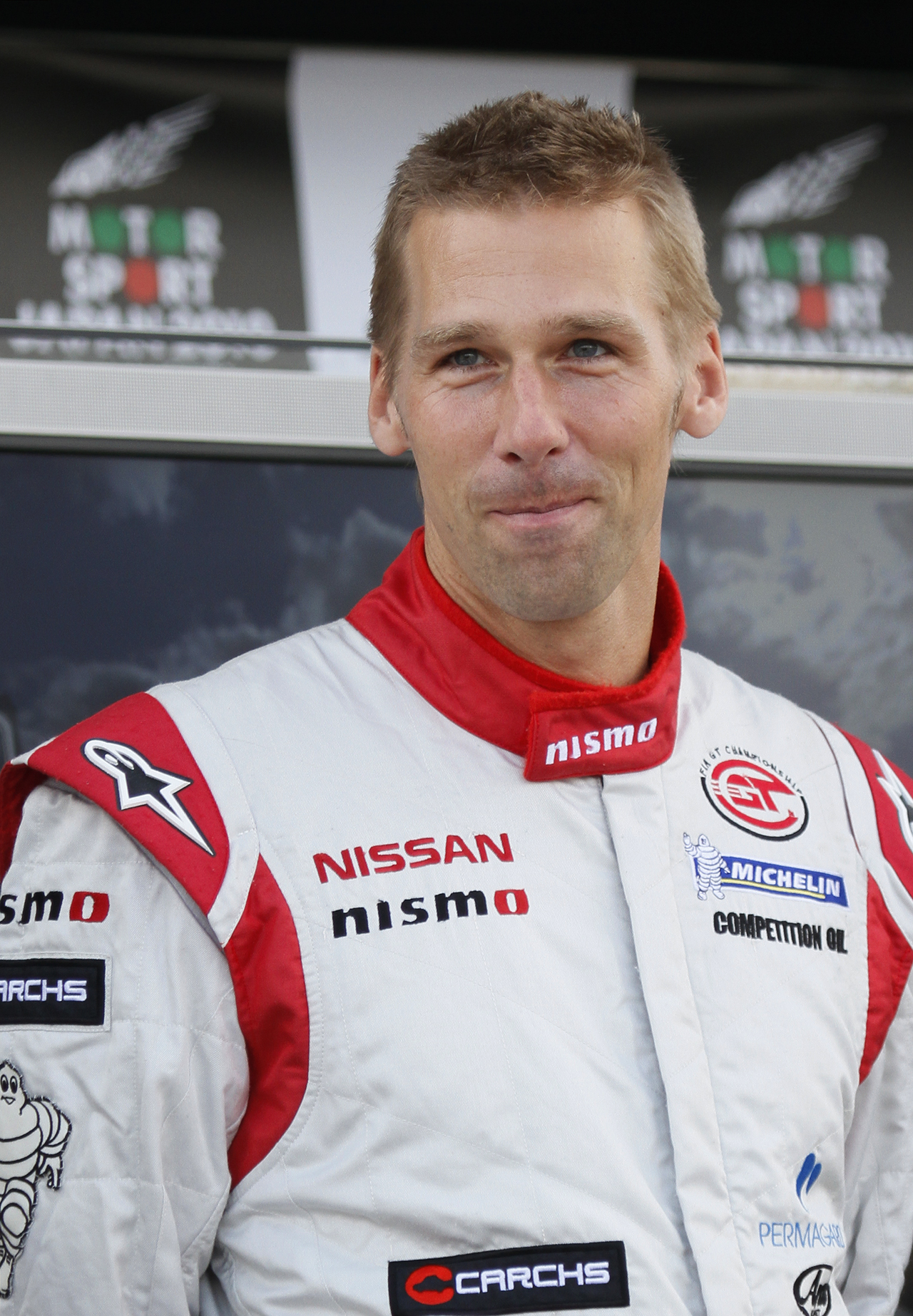
Krumm in 2010

== Career ==
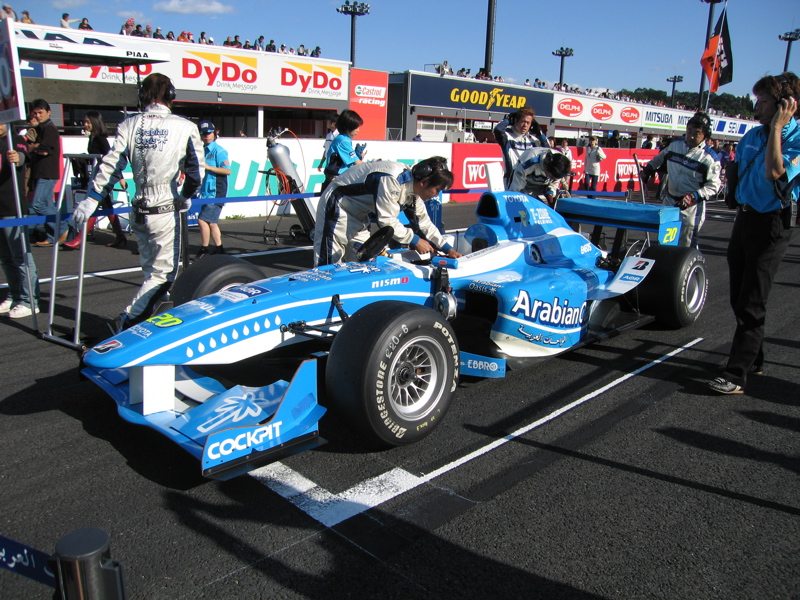
Krumm during the 2007 Formula Nippon season.

- 1984 Karting
- 1988 German Formula Ford, one win
- 1989 German Formula Ford Champion, three wins
- 1990 German Formula Opel Lotus champion
- 1991 Formula Opel Lotus Euroseries
- 1992 German Formula Three, one win
- 1993 German Formula Three, four wins
- 1994 Japanese Formula Three champion, six wins
- 1995 Japanese Touring Car Championship, 1 win, Formula Nippon & All-Japan GT
- 1996 Japanese Touring Car Championship, 1 win, Formula Nippon & Japanese Touring Car Championship, 3rd
- 1997 All-Japan GT champion & Japanese Touring Car Championship 3rd, one win
- 1998 Super Tourenwagen Cup & 5th at Le Mans (Nissan R390 GT1)
- 1999 All-Japan GT; Formula Nippon & No Finish at Le Mans (Nissan R391)
- 2000 All-Japan GT & Formula Nippon 2nd
- 2001 CART (Dale Coyne Racing, 2 races); Formula Nippon & All-Japan GT, 1 win
- 2002 All-Japan GT & 3rd at Le Mans, (Audi R8)
- 2003 All-Japan GT champion
- 2004 All-Japan GT, one win
- 2005 Super GT; Le Mans (Dallara SP1, did not finish)
- 2006 Super GT
- 2007 Super GT & Formula Nippon
- 2008 Super GT
- 2009 Le Mans Series (Kolles, 1 race) & FIA GT Championship (NISMO/Gigawave, 4 races)
- 2010 FIA GT1 World Championship (Nissan GT-R)
- 2011 FIA GT1 World Championship (Nissan GT-R) Drivers Champion
- 2012 Super GT
- 2013 Super GT
- 2014 Super GT
- 2015 Super GT

=== Complete German Formula Three results ===
(key) (Races in bold indicate pole position) (Races in italics indicate fastest lap)

Year	Entrant	Engine	Class	1	2	3	4	5	6	7	8	9	10	11	12	13	14	15	16	17	18	19	20	21	22	23	24	25	26	DC	Pts
1992	G+M Escom Motorsport	Opel	A	ZOL; 1; 2	ZOL; 2; 1	NÜR; 1 Ret	NÜR; 2; 6	WUN; 1; 6	WUN; 2; 2	AVU; 1 Ret	AVU; 2; 8	NÜR; 1; 6	NÜR; 2; 6	HOC; 1; 4	HOC; 2; 6	NOR; 1; 20	NOR; 2; 10	BRN; 1; 8	BRN; 2; 7	DIE; 1; 6	DIE; 2; 3	NÜR; 1; 5	NÜR; 2; 8	ALE; 1; 4	ALE; 2; 9	NÜR; 1; 6	NÜR; 2 Ret	HOC; 1 Ret	HOC; 2; 4	6th	158
1993	G+M Escom Motorsport	Opel	A	**ZOL**; **1**; 1	**ZOL**; **2**; 1	HOC; 1 Ret	HOC; 2; 8	NÜR; 1; 3	NÜR; 2; 1	WUN; 1; 8	WUN; 2 Ret	NOR; 1; 7	NOR; 2; 3	DIE; 1; 4	DIE; 2 Ret	NÜR; 1; 1	**NÜR**; **2**; 2	ALE; 1; 6	ALE; 2; 9	AVU; 1; 3	AVU; 2; 2	HOC; 1; 3	HOC; 2; 3							4th	198

=== Complete Japanese Formula 3 results ===
(key) (Races in bold indicate pole position) (Races in italics indicate fastest lap)

Year	Team	Engine	1	2	3	4	5	6	7	8	9	10	DC	Pts
1994	TOM'S	Toyota	SUZ; 4	FUJ; 3	TSU; 1	**SUZ**; 1	**SEN**; 1	**TOK**; 2	MIN; 1	**TAI**; 1	**SUG**; 1	SUZ; 5	1st	60

=== Complete Japanese Formula 3000/Formula Nippon results ===
(key) (Races in bold indicate pole position) (Races in italics indicate fastest lap)

Year	Entrant	1	2	3	4	5	6	7	8	9	10	DC	Points
1994	Dome	SUZ	FUJ	MIN	SUZ	SUG	FUJ	SUZ	FUJ; 4	FUJ; 7	SUZ; 15	11th	3
1995	Stellar International	SUZ	FUJ	MIN; Ret	SUZ; Ret	SUG; Ret	FUJ; Ret	TOK; 7	FUJ; Ret	SUZ; 7		NC	0
1996	Stellar	SUZ; 4	**MIN**; 6	FUJ; 11	TOK; 16	SUZ; 11	SUG; 9	FUJ; Ret	MIN; Ret	SUZ; Ret	FUJ; Ret	15th	4
1997	Stellar	SUZ; Ret	MIN; 13	FUJ; Ret	SUZ	SUG	FUJ	MIN				17th	1
1997	Team LeMans								MOT; 6	FUJ		17th	1
1997	Team Cerumo										SUZ; 10	17th	1
1999	Team 5ZIGEN	SUZ	MOT; 5	MIN; Ret	FUJ; 3	SUZ; 11	SUG; 4	FUJ; 9	MIN; 4	MOT; Ret	SUZ; 2	5th	19
2000	Team 5ZIGEN	SUZ; 2	MOT; 2	MIN; 2	**FUJ**; Ret	SUZ; 3	SUG; 5	MOT; 2	FUJ; 5	MIN; Ret	SUZ; 4	**2nd**	**35**
2001	Team 5ZIGEN	SUZ; Ret	MOT; 4	MIN; 4	FUJ; 2	SUZ; Ret	SUG; 6	FUJ; 3	MIN; Ret	MOT; 7	SUZ; 4	7th	20
2002	Team Impul	SUZ; 7	FUJ; 7	MIN	SUZ	MOT	SUG	FUJ	MIN	MOT	SUZ	NC	0
2007	Team Impul	FUJ; 6	SUZ; 7	MOT; 7	OKA; 8	SUZ; 5	FUJ; Ret	SUG; Ret	MOT; 15	SUZ; Ret		10th	12

=== Complete JTCC results ===
(key) (Races in bold indicate pole position) (Races in italics indicate fastest lap)

Year	Team	Car	1	2	3	4	5	6	7	8	9	10	11	12	13	14	15	16	DC	Pts
1995	TOM'S	Toyota Corona EXiV	FUJ; 1 Ret	FUJ; 2 DNS	SUG; 1; 2	SUG; 2 Ret	TOK; 1; 4	TOK; 2; 1	SUZ; 1; 14	SUZ; 2; 6	MIN; 1; 17	MIN; 2; 13	AID; 1; 4	AID; 2; 7	SEN; 1 Ret	SEN; 2 Ret	FUJ; 1 Ret	FUJ; 2; 9	8th	52
1996	TOM'S	Toyota Corona EXiV	FUJ; 1; 4	FUJ; 2; 7	SUG; 1; 4	**SUG**; **2**; 1	SUZ; 1; 3	SUZ; 2; 3	MIN; 1; 2	MIN; 2; 6	SEN; 1; 3	SEN; 2; 9	TOK; 1; 4	TOK; 2; 4	FUJ; 1; 7	FUJ; 2; 10			**3rd**	**87**
1997	TOM'S	Toyota Corona EXiV	FUJ; 1 C	FUJ; 2 C	AID; 1; 7	AID; 2; 9	**SUG**; **1**; 1	**SUG**; **2** Ret	SUZ; 1; 10	SUZ; 2 Ret									10th	39
1997	TOM'S	Toyota Chaser									MIN; 1; 6	MIN; 2; 4	SEN; 1 Ret	SEN; 2 DNS	TOK; 1 Ret	TOK; 2; 10	FUJ; 1; 12	FUJ; 2 Ret	10th	39

=== Complete JGTC/Super GT results ===
(key) (Races in bold indicate pole position) (Races in italics indicate fastest lap)

Year	Team	Car	Class	1	2	3	4	5	6	7	8	9	DC	Pts
1995	Toyota Castrol Team	Toyota Supra	GT1	SUZ; 6	FUJ; 6	SEN; 1	FUJ; Ret	SUG; 7	MIN; 4				5th	46
1996	Taku Motorsport	Porsche 911	GT500	SUZ	FUJ	SEN	FUJ; Ret	SUG	MIN				NC	0
1997	Toyota Castrol Team	Toyota Supra	GT500	SUZ; 14	**FUJ**; 3	SEN; 1	**FUJ**; 2	MIN; 1	SUG; 15				**1st**	**67**
1998	Impul	Nissan Skyline GT-R	GT500	SUZ	FUJ; C	SEN	FUJ	MOT	MIN	SUG			NC	0
1999	NISMO	Nissan Skyline GT-R	GT500	SUZ; 5	FUJ	SUG; 9	MIN; 12	FUJ; 12	TAI; 2	MOT; 2			6th	40
2000	NISMO	Nissan Skyline GT-R	GT500	MOT; 6	FUJ; 2	SUG; 11	FUJ; 6	TAI; 11	MIN; Ret	SUZ; 4			8th	37
2001	NISMO	Nissan Skyline GT-R	GT500	TAI; 4	FUJ; 3	SUG; Ret	FUJ; 1	MOT; 10	SUZ; 8	MIN; 6			5th	52
2002	NISMO	Nissan Skyline GT-R	GT500	TAI; 11	FUJ; 7	SUG; 7	SEP; 4	FUJ; 2	MOT; 10	MIN; 2	SUZ; Ret		8th	51
2003	NISMO	Nissan Skyline GT-R	GT500	**TAI**; 2	FUJ; 4	SUG; 3	FUJ; 5	FUJ; 2	MOT; 11	AUT; 5	SUZ; 3		**1st**	**86**
2004	NISMO	Nissan Fairlady Z	GT500	**TAI**; 9	SUG; Ret	SEP; 6	TOK; 1	MOT; 8	AUT; 9	SUZ; Ret			9th	39
2005	NISMO	Nissan Fairlady Z	GT500	**OKA**; 12	FUJ; 2	SEP; 6	SUG; 7	MOT; 4	FUJ; 9	AUT; 2	SUZ; 8		5th	57
2006	NISMO	Nissan Fairlady Z	GT500	SUZ; 12	OKA; 3	FUJ; 9	SEP; 2	SUG; 3	SUZ; 2	MOT; 10	AUT; 6	FUJ; 6	4th	75
2007	NISMO	Nissan Fairlady Z	GT500	SUZ; 5	OKA; 3	FUJ; 2	SEP; 10	SUG; Ret	SUZ; 6	MOT; 2	AUT; 4	FUJ; 9	5th	63
2008	NISMO	Nissan GT-R	GT500	**SUZ**; 2	OKA; 15	FUJ; 12	**SEP**; 2	SUG; 13	SUZ; 4	MOT; 7	AUT; 5	FUJ; 11	7th	57
2009	NISMO	Nissan GT-R	GT500	OKA	SUZ	FUJ	SEP	SUG	SUZ; 6	FUJ	AUT	MOT	18th	5
2012	NISMO	Nissan GT-R	GT500	OKA; 4	FUJ; 3	SEP; 7	SUG; Ret	SUZ; 5	FUJ; 11	AUT; 6	MOT; 6		8th	40
2013	Kondo Racing	Nissan GT-R	GT500	OKA; 13	FUJ; 12	SEP; 13	SUG; 5	SUZ; Ret	FUJ; 10	AUT; 6	MOT; 9		13th	14
2014	Kondo Racing	Nissan GT-R	GT500	OKA; 12	FUJ; 4	AUT; 13	SUG; 10	FUJ; 15	SUZ; 9	BUR; 2	MOT; 4		10th	35
2015	Kondo Racing	Nissan GT-R	GT500	OKA	FUJ	CHA	FUJ; 1	SUZ; 13	SUG; 3	AUT; 15	MOT; 12		10th	31

=== Complete Super Tourenwagen Cup results ===
(key) (Races in bold indicate pole position) (Races in italics indicate fastest lap)

Year	Team	Car	1	2	3	4	5	6	7	8	9	10	11	12	13	14	15	16	17	18	19	20	DC	Points
1998	Nissan Primera Racing	Nissan Primera	HOC; 1; 11	HOC; 1; 4	NÜR; 1; 12	NÜR; 2; 21	SAC; 1; 6	SAC; 2 Ret	NOR; 1 Ret	NOR; 2; 12	REG; 1; 7	REG; 2 Ret	WUN; 1; 6	WUN; 2; 6	ZWE; 1; 7	ZWE; 2; 12	SAL; 1; 9	SAL; 2; 6	OSC; 1; 2	OSC; 2; 4	NÜR; 1; 12	NÜR; 2; 8	9th	312

=== 24 Hours of Le Mans results ===
Year	Team	Co-Drivers	Car	Class	Laps	Pos.	Class Pos.
1998	(Japan) Nissan Motorsports (United Kingdom) TWR	(Denmark) John Nielsen (France) Franck Lagorce	Nissan R390 GT1	GT1	342	5th	5th
1999	(Japan) Nissan Motorsports	(Japan) Satoshi Motoyama (France) Érik Comas	Nissan R391	LMP	110	DNF	DNF
2002	(Germany) Audi Sport Team Joest	(Germany) Marco Werner (Austria) Philipp Peter	Audi R8	LMP900	372	**3rd**	**3rd**
2005	(United Kingdom) Rollcentre Racing	(United Kingdom) Bobby Verdon-Roe (Switzerland) Harold Primat	Dallara SP1-Nissan	LMP1	133	DNF	DNF
2012	(United States) Highcroft Racing	(United Kingdom) Marino Franchitti (Japan) Satoshi Motoyama	DeltaWing-Nissan	UNC	75	DNF	DNF
2013	(United Kingdom) Greaves Motorsport	(United Kingdom) Jann Mardenborough (Spain) Lucas Ordóñez	Zytek Z11SN - Nissan	LMP2	327	9th	**3rd**
2015	(Japan) Nissan Motorsports	(United Kingdom) Harry Tincknell (United Kingdom) Alex Buncombe	Nissan GT-R LM Nismo	LMP1	242	NC	NC

=== American open-wheel racing results ===
(key)

==== CART ====
Year	Team	1	2	3	4	5	6	7	8	9	10	11	12	13	14	15	16	17	18	19	20	21	Rank	Points	Ref
2001	Dale Coyne Racing	MTY; 23	LBH; 15	TXS	NZR	MOT	MIL	DET	POR	CLE	TOR	MIS	CHI	MDO	ROA	VAN	LAU	ROC	HOU	LS	SRF	FON	**31st**	**0**	

=== Complete GT1 World Championship results ===
Year	Team	Car	1	2	3	4	5	6	7	8	9	10	11	12	13	14	15	16	17	18	19	20	Pos	Points
2010	Sumo Power GT	Nissan	ABU; QR; 11	ABU; CR; 16	SIL; QR; 8	SIL; CR; Ret	BRN; QR; 3	BRN; CR; 3	PRI; QR; 9	PRI; CR; 2	SPA; QR; 8	SPA; CR; Ret	NÜR; QR; Ret	NÜR; CR; 15	ALG; QR; 1	ALG; CR; 4	NAV; QR; 16	NAV; CR; Ret	INT; QR; 2	INT; CR; 6	SAN; QR; 6	SAN; CR; Ret	9th	71
2011	JR Motorsports	Nissan	ABU; QR; 3	ABU; CR; 14	ZOL; QR; 7	ZOL; CR; 9	ALG; QR; 2	ALG; CR; 1	SAC; QR; 11	SAC; CR; 9	SIL; QR; 2	SIL; CR; 1	NAV; QR; 9	NAV; CR; 6	PRI; QR; 1	PRI; CR; 1	ORD; QR; 11	ORD; CR; 9	BEI; QR; 4	BEI; CR; 3	SAN; QR; 2	SAN; CR; Ret	**1st**	**137**

Sporting positions
Preceded by Tom Kristensen	All-Japan Formula Three Champion; 1994	Succeeded by Pedro de la Rosa
Preceded by David Brabham; John Nielsen	All-Japan Grand Touring Car Champion (GT500); 1997 with: Pedro de la Rosa	Succeeded by Érik Comas; Masami Kageyama
Preceded by Juichi Wakisaka; Akira Iida	All-Japan Grand Touring Car Champion (GT500); 2003 with: Satoshi Motoyama	Succeeded by Satoshi Motoyama; Richard Lyons
Preceded by Michael Bartels; Andrea Bertolini	FIA GT1 World Champion; 2011 with: Lucas Luhr	Succeeded by Marc Basseng; Markus Winkelhock
