= Patrick Bernhardt =

German auto racing driver

Patrick Bernhardt (born 26 October 1971 in Wetzlar) is a German racing driver.

== Career ==
Bernhardt competed in the German Formula Three Championship in 1993 and 1994 for Volkswagen Motorsport. He also competed in the German Super Touring Championship in 1994.

Bernhardt returned to motor racing in 2000 when he began competing in the German Touring Car Challenge for Hotfiel Sport in a Ford Focus, which he did until 2004. He finished 2000 in eleventh place, but improved to finish fourth in 2001. He finished runner-up to Claudia Hürtgen in 2003.

The team joined the new World Touring Car Championship in 2005. Bernhardt spent most of the season as a development driver for the team, but was given his chance at the end of season Race of Macau.
