= Steve Arnold (racing driver) =

British racing driver

Steven Arnold
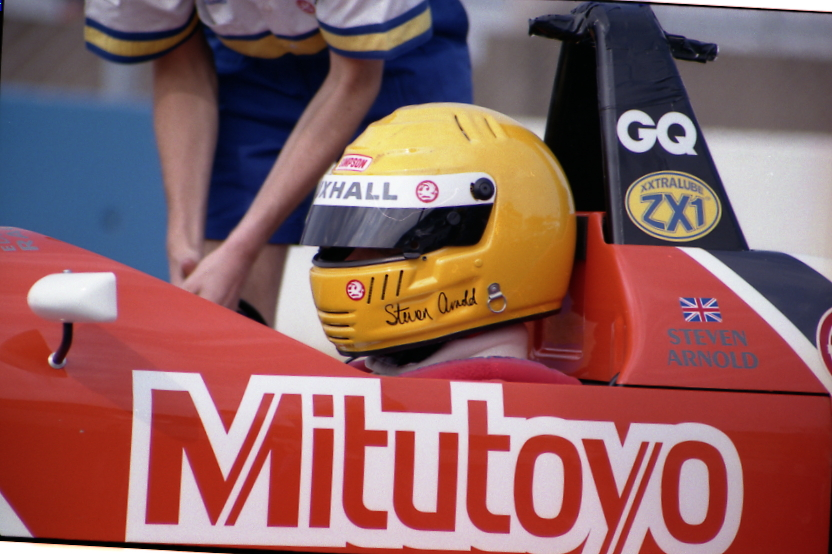
- Steven Arnold, Donington, British F3 1995
- Nationality: (United Kingdom) British
- Born: 10 March 1971 (age 54) Stroud, United Kingdom

Steve Arnold (born 10 March 1971 in Stroud, Gloucestershire) is a race car driver from the United Kingdom. His main career highlight was one race in the 1996 Formula 3000 championship for Edenbridge Racing, although he also filled in for a race in the 2003 Sportscar World Championship. Arnold made the giant step from karting to the British Formula 3 Championship, initially competing in Class B for older cars to gain experience before racing for his father's team (Richard Arnold Developments) and becoming the first person to race a current year model Dallara chassis in the British Championship. After two years with the family team he drove for Edenbridge Racing in 1995 in British Formula Three.

Arnold now competes occasionally in the Orwell Supersports Cup for Historic Sports Cars where he drives a Chevron B19 powered by a Ford BDG engine prepared by Racing Fabrications. In 2006 Arnold entered four races and achieved three wins and a second-place finish with fastest lap in all four races.
