= Thomas Winkelhock =

German racing driver (born 1968)

- Nationality: (Germany) German
- Born: 22 May 1968 (age 58) Waiblingen, Baden-Württemberg, West Germany
- Relatives: Manfred Winkelhock (brother), Joachim Winkelhock (brother), Markus Winkelhock (nephew)

Championship titles
- 1989 1998: Formula König; ADAC Procar Series

Thomas Winkelhock (born 22 May 1968) is a German racing driver. He has competed in such series as the European Touring Car Championship and the German Formula Three Championship. He won the Formula König series in 1989 and was the ADAC Procar Series champion in 1998. He comes from a family of racers.
