= Leo Machitski =

Russian racing driver (born 1983)

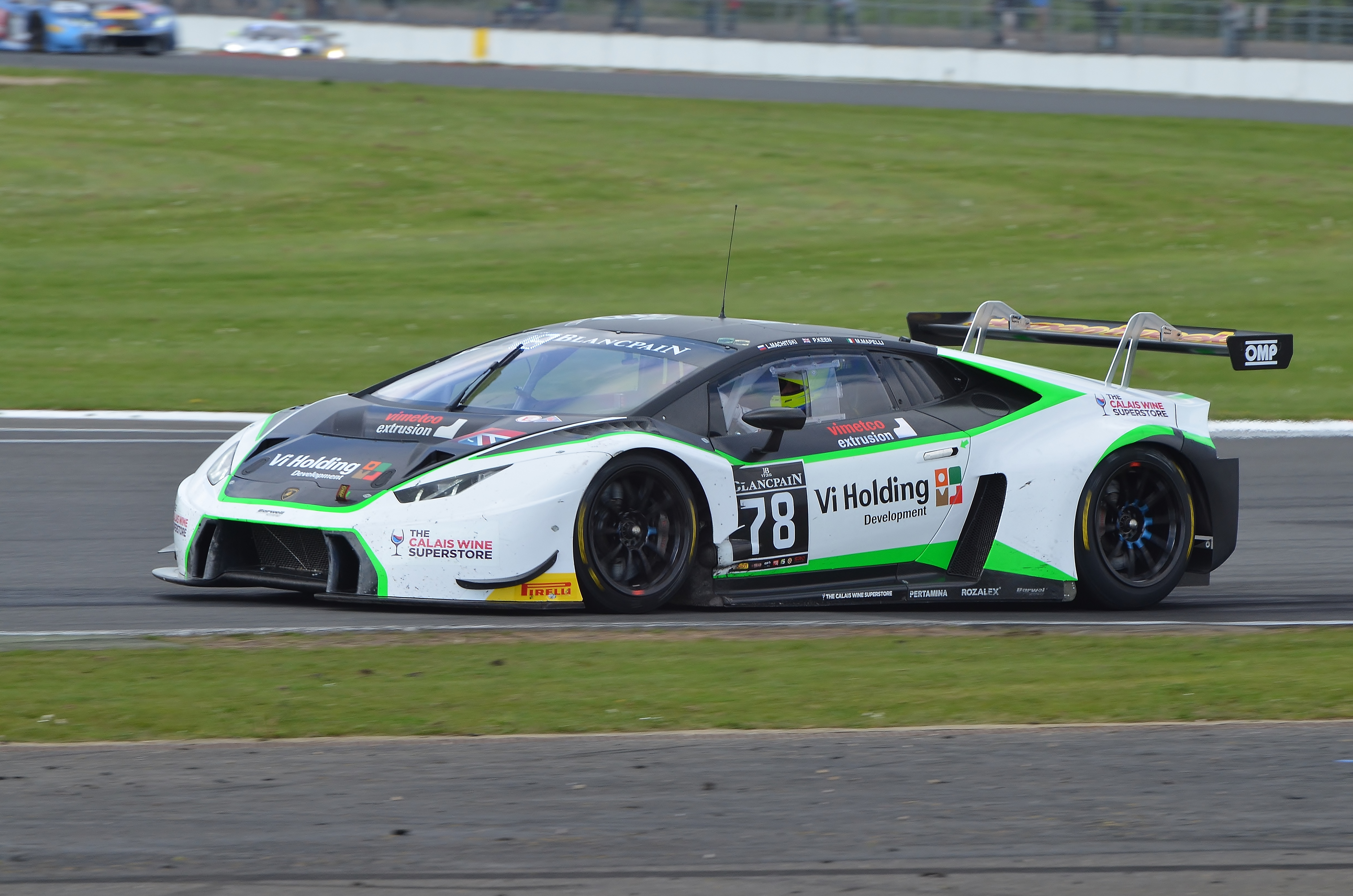
- Machitski in 2016
- Nationality: (Russia) Russian
- Born: Leonid Vitalyevich Machitski; 4 January 1983 (age 43) Irkutsk, Russian SFSR, Soviet Union
- Categorisation: FIA Bronze

Championship titles
- 2006, 2021 2018, 2019 2018: British GT Championship – GT3; Blancpain GT Series Endurance Cup – Am; Blancpain GT Series – Am

Leonid Vitalyevich Machitski (Russian: Леонид Витальевич Мащицкий; born 4 January 1983) is a Russian racing driver who last competed in the British GT Championship for Barwell Motorsport.

== Career ==
Machitski began racing cars in 2005, competing in the Supercar Challenge and Britcar, before joining Barwell Motorsport for a dual campaign in the FIA GT3 European Championship and British GT Championship the following year. Scoring a best result of fourth at Dijon in the former, Machitski found more success in the latter, taking four class wins and three further podiums to seal the GT3 title at Silverstone. After selling his championship-winning Aston Martin DBRS9, Machitski raced in the GT2 class of the FIA GT Championship for Tech 9 Motorsport the following year, finishing third at the Spa 24 Hours and ending the year 13th in points.

In 2008, Machitski raced part-time in British GT Championship for the same team, before making one-off appearances in the series across 2009 and 2010 for Barwell Motorsport, and joining Gravity Charouz Racing to race in the 2011 FIA GT3 European Championship. In his only full-time season in the series, Machitski scored a lone podium at the Slovakia Ring by finishing second in race two, helping him end the year 19th in points. The following year, Machitski made one-off appearances for Rhino's Leipert Motorsport in the FIA GT3 European Championship and Valmon Racing Team Russia in the FIA GT1 World Championship.

After not racing in 2013, Machitski joined BMW-fielding Team Russia by Barwell to race in the GTC class of the European Le Mans Series in 2014, taking a best result of fourth at Silverstone. During 2014, Machitski also raced in the 24 Hours of Spa for Team Parker Racing, finishing second in the Am class. Remaining with the team for 2015, Machitski switched to the Blancpain Endurance Series, competing in Pro-Am in all but one race, that being at Le Castellet, where he finished second in the Am class. As Barwell switched to Lamborghini machinery, Machitski remained with the team for the following two seasons, scoring a lone Pro-Am podium at Le Castellet in 2016. Remaining with Barwell to race in the Am class in 2018, Machitski scored class wins at the 24 Hours of Spa and Barcelona, as well two extra podiums to seal the Am title. During 2018, Machitski also made a one-off return to the British GT Championship for the same team at Oulton Park.

The following year, Machitski stayed with Barwell to continue in the Blancpain GT Series Endurance Cup, taking class wins at Monza and Silverstone and two other podiums to clinch the Am title for the second year in a row. During 2019, Machitski also won the 24 Hours of Barcelona with the same team. Stepping up to the Pro-Am class for 2020 and continuing with Barwell, Machitski took a class win at the 24 Hours of Spa and a second-place finish at Le Castellet to finish third in the class standings. In 2021, Machitski returned to the British GT Championship as he stayed with Barwell, taking a lone win at Spa to secure the GT3 overall title and runner-up in the GT3 Pro-Am standings. During 2021, Machitski raced part-time in the GT World Challenge Europe Endurance Cup, taking a best result of third in the Pro-Am class at the 24 Hours of Spa. Machitski was set to remain with Barwell Motorsport for the following year's British GT season, but those plans fell through when Motorsport UK suspended its recognition of Russian licences due to the Russian invasion of Ukraine.

== Racing record ==
=== Racing career summary ===
Season	Series	Team	Races	Wins	Poles	F/Laps	Podiums	Points	Position
2006	FIA GT3 European Championship	Barwell Motorsport	9	0	1	0	0	13	22nd
2006	British GT Championship – GT3	Barwell Motorsport	8	4	3	0	7	49	**1st**
2007	FIA GT Championship – GT2	Tech 9 Motorsport	10	0	0	0	1	24.5	13th
2008	British GT Championship – GT3	Tech 9 Motorsport	7	0	0	0	0	12	29th
2009	British GT Championship – Invitation	Barwell Motorsport	2	1	0	0	1	0	NC
2010	British GT Championship – GT3	Barwell-Beechdean	2	0	0	0	0	4	42nd
2011	FIA GT3 European Championship	Gravity Charouz Racing	12	0	0	0	1	26	19th
2012	FIA GT3 European Championship	Rhino's Leipert Motorsport	2	0	0	0	0	3	21st
2012	FIA GT1 World Championship	Valmon Racing Team Russia	2	0	0	0	0	0	33rd
2014	European Le Mans Series – GTC	Team Russia by Barwell	5	0	0	0	0	23	12th
2014	Blancpain Endurance Series – Am	Team Parker Racing	1	0	0	0	1	26	16th
2015	Blancpain Endurance Series – Pro-Am	Team Russia by Barwell	4	0	0	0	0	19	17th
2015	Blancpain Endurance Series – Am	Team Russia by Barwell	1	0	0	0	1	24	12th
2015	Silverstone 24 Hours – Class 2	Team Russia by Barwell	1	0	0	0	0	—N/a	DNF
2016	Blancpain GT Series Endurance Cup	Barwell Motorsport	5	0	0	0	0	0	NC
2016	Blancpain GT Series Endurance Cup – Pro-Am	Barwell Motorsport	5	0	0	0	1	29	15th
2016	Intercontinental GT Challenge – Am	Barwell Motorsport	1	0	0	0	0	6	8th
2017	Blancpain GT Series Endurance Cup	Barwell Motorsport	5	0	0	0	0	0	NC
2017	Blancpain GT Series Endurance Cup – Pro-Am	Barwell Motorsport	5	0	0	0	0	20	24th
2017	Intercontinental GT Challenge	Barwell Motorsport	1	0	0	0	0	0	NC
2018	British GT Championship – GT3 Pro-Am	Barwell Motorsport	2	0	0	0	0	16	12th
2018	Blancpain GT Series Endurance Cup	Barwell Motorsport	5	0	0	0	0	0	NC
2018	Blancpain GT Series Endurance Cup – Am	Barwell Motorsport	5	2	0	1	4	124	**1st**
2019	Blancpain GT Series Endurance Cup	Barwell Motorsport	5	0	0	0	0	0	NC
2019	Blancpain GT Series Endurance Cup – Am	Barwell Motorsport	5	2	4	1	4	126	**1st**
2019	24H GT Series – A6 Pro	Barwell Motorsport	1	1	0	0	1	29	NC
2020	GT World Challenge Europe Endurance Cup	Barwell Motorsport	4	0	0	0	0	0	NC
2020	GT World Challenge Europe Endurance Cup – Pro-Am	Barwell Motorsport	4	1	0	0	2	76	**3rd**
2020	Intercontinental GT Challenge	Barwell Motorsport	1	0	0	0	0	0	NC
2021	British GT Championship – GT3 Pro-Am	Barwell Motorsport	9	2	0	0	6	87	**2nd**
2021	GT World Challenge Europe Endurance Cup	Barwell Motorsport	2	0	0	0	0	0	NC
2021	GT World Challenge Europe Endurance Cup – Pro-Am	Barwell Motorsport	2	0	0	0	1	33	13th
2021	Intercontinental GT Challenge	Barwell Motorsport	1	0	0	0	0	0	NC
2021	GT Cup Championship – GT3	Barwell Motorsport	2	0	0	0	0	0	NC

=== Complete FIA GT3 European Championship results ===
(key) (Races in bold indicate pole position; races in italics indicate fastest lap)

Year	Entrant	Chassis	Engine	1	2	3	4	5	6	7	8	9	10	11	12	Pos.	Points
2006	Barwell Motorsport	Aston Martin DBRS9	Aston Martin AM04 6.0 L V12	SIL; 1; 11	SIL; 2 Ret	OSC; 1; 11	OSC; 2; 10	SPA; 1; 20	SPA; 2; 6	DIJ; 1; 4	DIJ; 2; 5	MUG; 1 DNS	MUG; 2; 20			22nd	13
2011	Gravity Charouz Racing	Mercedes-Benz SLS AMG GT3	Mercedes-Benz 6.2 L V8	ALG; 1 Ret	ALG; 2 Ret	SIL; 1; 19	SIL; 2; 17	NAV; 1; 13	NAV; 2; 21	LEC; 1; 15	LEC; 2; 8	SLO; 1; 8	SLO; 2; 2	ZAN; 1; 11	ZAN; 2; 24	19th	26
2012	Rhino's Leipert Motorsport	Lamborghini Gallardo LP600+ GT3	Lamborghini 5.2 L V10	NOG; 1	NOG; 2	ZOL; 1; 9	ZOL; 2; 10	NAV; 1	NAV; 2	ALG; 1	ALG; 2	MSC; 1	MSC; 2	NUR; 1	NUR; 2	21st	3

=== Complete British GT Championship results ===
(key) (Races in bold indicate pole position) (Races in italics indicate fastest lap)

Year	Team	Car	Class	1	2	3	4	5	6	7	8	9	10	11	12	13	14	15	16	Pos	Points
2006	Barwell Motorsport	Aston Martin DBRS9	GT3	OUL; 1	OUL; 2	DON; 8	PAU; 1	PAU; 2	MON; 1	MON; 2	SNE; 1; 5	SNE; 2; 9	ROC; 1; 2	**ROC**; **2**; 4	**BRH**; **1**; 3	BRH; 2; 4	**SIL**; 7	MAG; 1	MAG; 2	1st	49
2008	Tech 9 Motorsport	Lamborghini Gallardo LP560 GT3	GT3	OUL; 1 DNS	OUL; 2 DNS	KNO; 1; 5	KNO; 2 DSQ	**ROC**; **1** Ret	**ROC**; **2** DSQ	SNE; 1; 4	SNE; 2; 6	THR; 1 Ret	THR; 2 DNS	BRH; 1	BRH; 2	DON	SIL			29th	12
2009	Barwell Motorsport	Ginetta G50Z	Invitation	OUL; 1	OUL; 2	SPA; 1	SPA; 2	ROC; 1	ROC; 2	KNO; 1	KNO; 2	SNE; 1	SNE; 2	DON	SIL	BRH; 1; 5	BRH; 2; 1			NC	0
2010	Barwell-Beechdean	Aston Martin DBRS9	GT3	OUL; 1	OUL; 2	KNO; 1	KNO; 2	SPA	ROC; 1	ROC; 2	SIL	SNE; 1	SNE; 2	BRH; 1; 5	BRH; 2 Ret	DON				42nd	4
2018	Barwell Motorsport	Lamborghini Huracán GT3	GT3 Pro-Am	OUL; 1; 5	OUL; 2; 7	ROC	SNE; 1	SNE; 2	SIL	SPA	BRH	DON								12th	16
2021	Barwell Motorsport	Lamborghini Huracán GT3 Evo	GT3 Pro-Am	BRH; 3	SIL; 3	DON1; Ret	SPA; 1	SNE; 1; 3	SNE; 2; 5	OUL; 1; 2	OUL; 2; 4	DON2; 4								2nd	87

=== Complete FIA GT Championship results ===
(key) (Races in bold indicate pole position) (Races in italics indicate fastest lap)

Year	Team	Car	Class	1	2	3	4	5	6	7	8	9	10	11	12	Pos.	Pts
2007	Tech 9 Motorsport	Porsche 911 GT3 RSR	GT2	ZHU; 6	SIL; 6	BUC; Ret	MNZ; 6	OSC; 7	SPA; 6H; 6	SPA; 12H; 5	SPA; 24H; 3	ADR; 5	BRN; 9	NOG	ZOL	13th	24.5

=== Complete FIA GT1 World Championship results ===
Year	Team	Car	1	2	3	4	5	6	7	8	9	10	11	12	13	14	15	16	17	18	Pos	Points
2012	Valmon Racing Team Russia	Aston Martin DBRS9	NOG; QR	NOG; CR	ZOL; QR	ZOL; CR	NAV; QR; 14	NAV; QR; Ret	SVK; QR	SVK; CR	ALG; QR	ALG; CR	SVK; QR	SVK; CR	MOS; QR	MOS; CR	NUR; QR	NUR; CR	DON; QR	DON; CR	33rd	0

=== Complete European Le Mans Series results ===
Year	Entrant	Class	Chassis	Engine	1	2	3	4	5	Rank	Points
2014	Team Russia by Barwell	GTC	BMW Z4 GT3	BMW P65B44 4.4 L V8	SIL; 4	IMO; 9	RBR; Ret	LEC; 10	EST; 6	12th	23

=== Complete GT World Challenge Europe results ===
==== GT World Challenge Europe Endurance Cup ====
Year	Team	Car	Class	1	2	3	4	5	6	7	Pos.	Points
2014	Team Parker Racing	Audi R8 LMS ultra	Am	MNZ	SIL	LEC	SPA; 6H; 42	SPA; 12H; 31	SPA; 24H; 28	NÜR	16th	26
2015	Team Russia by Barwell	BMW Z4 GT3	Pro-Am	MNZ; Ret	SIL; 30		SPA; 6H; 15	SPA; 12H; 20	SPA; 24H; 8	NÜR; 44	17th	19
2015	Team Russia by Barwell	BMW Z4 GT3	Am			LEC; 25					12th	24
2016	Barwell Motorsport	Lamborghini Huracán GT3	Pro-Am	MNZ; 42	SIL; Ret	LEC; 12	SPA; 6H; 36	SPA; 12H; 32	SPA; 24H; 25	NÜR; 24	15th	29
2017	Barwell Motorsport	Lamborghini Huracán GT3	Pro-Am	MNZ; Ret	SIL; 26	LEC; 24	SPA; 6H; 57	SPA; 12H; 49	SPA; 24H; Ret	CAT; 27	24th	20
2018	Barwell Motorsport	Lamborghini Huracán GT3	Am	MNZ; 33	SIL; 42	LEC; 22	SPA; 6H; 32	SPA; 12H; 34	SPA; 24H; 27	CAT; 29	1st	124
2019	Barwell Motorsport	Lamborghini Huracán GT3 Evo	Am	**MNZ**; 16	**SIL**; 29	LEC; 29	**SPA**; **6H**; 28	**SPA**; **12H**; 31	**SPA**; **24H**; 35	**CAT**; 31	1st	126
2020	Barwell Motorsport	Lamborghini Huracán GT3 Evo	Pro-Am	IMO; 34	NÜR; 25	SPA; 6H; 26	SPA; 12H; 22	SPA; 24H; 15	LEC; 22		3rd	76
2021	Barwell Motorsport	Lamborghini Huracán GT3 Evo	Pro-Am	MNZ	LEC; Ret	SPA; 6H; 19	SPA; 12H; 24	SPA; 24H; 18	NÜR	CAT	13th	33
