= 2012 FIA GT1 World Championship =

Auto racing competition

Seasons
- ← 2011 2013 (FIA GT) →

The 2012 FIA GT1 World Championship was the third and final season of the SRO Group's FIA GT1 World Championship, an auto racing series for grand tourer cars. The 2012 championship, which was open to GT3 Series Grand Touring cars, featured two titles awarded to the highest scoring competitors over the course of the season: the GT1 World Championship for Drivers and the GT1 World Championship for Teams. The series underwent regulation changes in 2012 with GT3 cars replacing the GT1 category vehicles used in the previous two seasons of the World Championship. Hexis AMR, now under the title Hexis Racing, returned as the defending Teams' World Champions, while German drivers Michael Krumm and Lucas Luhr didn't return to the series to defend their Drivers' World Championships.

The series commenced at the Circuit Paul Armagnac in France on 6–9 April and ended at Donington Park in England on 27–29 September. The nine-event calendar included two new races, inaugural events in Russia and Slovakia. In addition to the races, six new manufacturers and seven new teams made their GT1 Series debut at the opening race of the season.

== Calendar ==
Stéphane Ratel, CEO of the SRO Group, stated during the course of the 2011 season that the 2012 calendar would include rounds in Europe, as well as Brazil, Argentina, and the United Arab Emirates. Ratel was also in discussions with venues in Australasia, North America, and Russia for possible additions to the championship calendar, as part of his plan to limit the calendar to only four European rounds. During the 2011 season finale, Ratel confirmed that the 2012 season would open at the Circuit Paul Armagnac in Nogaro, France, a departure from the opening round of the past two seasons at the Yas Marina Circuit, Abu Dhabi. The Abu Dhabi round was removed from the calendar, as were events held at Silverstone and the Sachsenring during the 2011 season. The Circuit Paul Ricard was also removed, being replaced by the Circuit Paul Armagnac. The series was the first major international motorsport series to visit Russia, with a race to be held at the Moscow Raceway in Volokolamsk, while the final round was initially moved from San Luis, Argentina to the Buddh International Circuit in India before later being cancelled altogether.

One week before the opening round of the season, the SRO revised the calendar further. The races scheduled for Zandvoort and San Luis were removed. They were replaced by two new events, with one at the Automotodróm Slovakia Ring, Slovakia in June, and the second at the Korea International Circuit in South Korea in September. The date of the Russian round of the championship was also altered, moving the race back two weeks later than its original date. The planned Korean event was later removed from the series calendar, although attempts were made to replace the event. On 1 July the series' two Chinese events were also cancelled. On 27 July the SRO announced two European events to replace the two cancelled Chinese rounds; a second round at the Slovakia Ring in August, with the Moscow round brought forward to accommodate a round at the Nürburgring, which was previously visited by GT1 in 2010. In a further change, the Moscow round and Nürburgring rounds featured a combined grid from both the GT1 World Championship and the FIA GT3 European Championship.

Event	Circuit	Date
1	Circuit Paul Armagnac, Nogaro, France	9 April
2	Circuit Zolder, Heusden-Zolder, Belgium	22 April
3	Circuito de Navarra, Los Arcos, Spain	27 May
4	Automotodróm Slovakia Ring, Orechová Potôň, Slovakia	10 June
5	Autódromo Internacional do Algarve, Portimão, Portugal	8 July
6	Automotodróm Slovakia Ring, Orechová Potôň, Slovakia	19 August
7	Moscow Raceway, Volokolamsky District, Russia	2 September
8	Nürburgring, Nürburg, Germany	23 September
9	(United Kingdom) Donington Park, North West Leicestershire, Great Britain	30 September

== Entries ==
=== GT1 World regulations ===
In an attempt to attract more manufacturers to the World Championship, a new set of regulations was devised by the SRO Group and the FIA World Motor Sport Council to allow cars from a variety of racing classes to compete together in a single championship. The new category, termed GT World, would have allowed for cars meeting the 2011 FIA GT1 and GT3 regulations, as well as 2009 FIA GT2 regulations to be modified to ensure balanced competition between the three classes.

After further meetings between SRO, FIA and team owners, it was agreed to eliminate GT2 cars from GT World and to adopt regulations from the GT3 category. Current GT3 cars would have upgraded to the newly defined GT World specification and current GT1 cars would have their performance aligned to that of the GT World specification. As part of the equalization process, GT3 specification cars were to be allowed upgrades to increase their speed, as well as the adoption of carbon brakes and less restrictions on exhaust noise levels. Anti-lock braking systems utilized on GT3 cars would be allowed under GT World regulations. As in the previous two seasons, all cars would still receive Balance of Performance modifications during the course of the season to help ensure an even field.

During the final 2011 meeting of the FIA World Motor Sport Council, following discussions between the SRO, teams, and manufacturers/tuners concerning the organisation of the championship, it was agreed to run the 2012 FIA GT1 World Championship with GT3 cars only, as the existing field of GT1 cars was no longer sufficient. Having only one class, most of the proposed performance upgrades for GT3 cars were scrapped retaining only the less restricted exhaust noise levels and Balance of Performance modifications. The series also changed tyre suppliers, with Pirelli replacing Michelin as the sole supplier. Original plans to rename the series to the FIA GT World Championship were also abandoned, with the series retaining its title despite being composed of GT3 cars.

=== Teams and Manufacturers ===
As part of the new GT World regulation set, manufacturers would only be allowed one private team to campaign their cars in the Championship instead of the two teams required in previous seasons. This expanded the championships to include ten or more manufacturers instead of the previous five and six. Seven teams and manufacturers were initially announced by Stéphane Ratel during a press conference at the Spa 24 Hours in July 2011, with several 2011 teams returning, including Young Driver AMR, Münnich Motorsport, JR Motorsport, Marc VDS and Belgian Racing. However, Marc VDS and Belgian Racing later withdrew their entries in order to concentrate on their Blancpain Endurance Series teams, while Young Driver AMR later moved to the ADAC GT Masters and JR Motorsport and Sumo Power withdrew to campaign the FIA World Endurance Championship. 2011 FIA GT1 World Champions Hexis Racing later announced their return to the series, joining with manufacturer McLaren, while Münnich switched to Mercedes-Benz.

New entries for the 2012 season include 2010 FIA GT1 World Champions Vita4One Racing taking over the new BMW campaign from the withdrawn Marc VDS, while 2010 entrant Reiter Engineering returns with Lamborghini. FIA GT3 European Championship participant Team WRT moved to GT1 to represent Audi while former FIA GT Champions AF Corse returned with Ferrari. The grid was later expanded to eighteen cars at the close of entry applications with the return of the Exim Bank Team China title, now under the control of Belgian Porsche team Mühlner Motorsport, and the additions of Valmon Racing Team Russia representing Aston Martin and a third team supported by Spanish touring car team Sunred Engineering campaigning Fords. 2011 manufacturers Nissan and Chevrolet were not represented on the 2012 grid.

=== Drivers ===
Several drivers from the 2011 season return for 2012, most notably the drivers of the defending Teams Champions Hexis Racing. Stef Dusseldorp remains with the squad while Frédéric Makowiecki returns to the Hexis, having driven for the team in 2010 but campaigning for Marc VDS in 2011. FIA GT3 graduate Grégoire Demoustier joins the squad, partnered with McLaren Automotive test driver Álvaro Parente. Münnich Motorsport also retains much of their 2011 line-up, with the pairing of team owner Marc Basseng and Markus Winkelhock remaining while Nicky Pastorelli gets a new teammate in Mercedes-Benz factory driver Thomas Jäger, who also previously drove for Münnich in 2010.

Two teams which campaigned FIA GT1 in 2010 also return, with both of them retaining some drivers from two seasons prior. Reiter Engineering's Peter Kox returns after a shortened 2011 season with Swiss Racing Team, and is joined by series newcomer Darryl O'Young of Hong Kong. Tomáš Enge, who has previously finished fourth in the Drivers' Championship two years in a row with Young Driver AMR, switches to Reiter and is teamed with German Prince Albert von Thurn und Taxis. 2010 Teams Champion Vita4One bring to the series 2010 Drivers Champion and team owner Michael Bartels, now partnered Dutchman Yelmer Buurman, who won two races in his sole appearance in 2011 with Exim Bank Team China. The sister BMW is shared by two Austrians, Nikolaus Mayr-Melnhof and Mathias Lauda, former Deutsche Tourenwagen Masters driver and son of Formula One World Drivers' Champion Niki Lauda. Although new to the FIA GT1 series, AF Corse enters the championship with a remnant of their four straight FIA GT2 Championships in Finn Toni Vilander, who won the Drivers Championship in the category in 2007 and 2008. Vilander is joined by series newcomer Filip Salaquarda, a graduate of the Formula Renault 3.5 Series. 2011 FIA GT3 Drivers' Champion Francesco Castellacci helms the second Ferrari, joined by fellow FIA GT3 competitor Enzo Ide.

Team WRT's quartet of drivers are all making their debuts in the FIA GT1 World Championship. Former Grand Prix driver Stéphane Ortelli is joined by former Formula 3 Euro Series driver Laurens Vanthoor, while the team's other car is driven by Oliver Jarvis and Frank Stippler, both of whom are factory Audi drivers. Exim Bank Team China's drivers are also equally new, with FIA Formula Two Championship driver Benjamin Lariche joining the second Chinese driver in the history of the series, Ren Wei. Mike Parisy, a former winner in FIA GT3, and Porsche Supercup driver Matt Halliday of New Zealand will enter the second car. Valmon Racing Team Russia brings Russian involvement in the series for the first time with two drivers, Sergey Afanasyev and Alexey Vasilyev. Former Formula One and Stock Car Brasil driver Antônio Pizzonia was originally scheduled to partner Vasilyev, but was replaced on the eve of the Nogaro round by former GT1 race winner Maxime Martin. Andreas Zuber brings two years of FIA GT1 experience to the car shared with Afanasyev. Sunred originally intended to partner experienced Serbian driver Miloš Pavlović — who ran two rounds in 2011 — with Formula Two graduate Andy Soucek as his teammate, whilst putting Matteo Cressoni alongside Emanuele Moncini in the second entry. However, the #11 car was not ready in time for the Nogaro round and was subsequently withdrawn. The team re-arranged their driver line-ups, entering Pavlović and Cressoni in the race whilst sidelining Soucek and Moncini until the second car was ready.

=== Season entries ===
Team	Car	Engine	No.	Drivers	Events
(France) Hexis Racing	McLaren MP4-12C GT3	McLaren M838T 3.8 L Turbo V8	1	(Netherlands) Stef Dusseldorp	All
(France) Hexis Racing	McLaren MP4-12C GT3	McLaren M838T 3.8 L Turbo V8	1	(France) Frédéric Makowiecki	All
(France) Hexis Racing	McLaren MP4-12C GT3	McLaren M838T 3.8 L Turbo V8	2	(France) Grégoire Demoustier	All
(France) Hexis Racing	McLaren MP4-12C GT3	McLaren M838T 3.8 L Turbo V8	2	(Portugal) Álvaro Parente	All
(Italy) AF Corse	Ferrari 458 Italia GT3	Ferrari F136F 4.5 L V8	3	(Finland) Toni Vilander	1–8
(Italy) AF Corse	Ferrari 458 Italia GT3	Ferrari F136F 4.5 L V8	3	(Czech Republic) Filip Salaquarda	All
(Italy) AF Corse	Ferrari 458 Italia GT3	Ferrari F136F 4.5 L V8	3	(Italy) Marco Cioci	9
(Italy) AF Corse	Ferrari 458 Italia GT3	Ferrari F136F 4.5 L V8	4	(Italy) Francesco Castellacci	All
(Italy) AF Corse	Ferrari 458 Italia GT3	Ferrari F136F 4.5 L V8	4	(Belgium) Enzo Ide	All
Valmon Racing Team Russia	Aston Martin DBRS9	Aston Martin AM04 6.0 L V12	6	(Russia) Sergey Afanasyev	1–3
Valmon Racing Team Russia	Aston Martin DBRS9	Aston Martin AM04 6.0 L V12	6	(Austria) Andreas Zuber	1–3
Valmon Racing Team Russia	Aston Martin DBRS9	Aston Martin AM04 6.0 L V12	7	(Belgium) Maxime Martin	1–3
Valmon Racing Team Russia	Aston Martin DBRS9	Aston Martin AM04 6.0 L V12	7	(Russia) Alexey Vasilyev	1–2
Valmon Racing Team Russia	Aston Martin DBRS9	Aston Martin AM04 6.0 L V12	7	(Russia) Leonid Machitski	3
Exim Bank Team China	Porsche 911 GT3-R	Porsche M97/74 4.0 L Flat-6	8	(France) Benjamin Lariche	1–5
Exim Bank Team China	Porsche 911 GT3-R	Porsche M97/74 4.0 L Flat-6	8	(China) Ren Wei	1–2
Exim Bank Team China	Porsche 911 GT3-R	Porsche M97/74 4.0 L Flat-6	8	(France) Dino Lunardi	3, 5
Exim Bank Team China	Porsche 911 GT3-R	Porsche M97/74 4.0 L Flat-6	8	(Austria) Andreas Zuber	4
Exim Bank Team China	Porsche 911 GT3-R	Porsche M97/74 4.0 L Flat-6	9	(France) Mike Parisy	1–5
Exim Bank Team China	Porsche 911 GT3-R	Porsche M97/74 4.0 L Flat-6	9	(New Zealand) Matt Halliday	1–4
Exim Bank Team China	Porsche 911 GT3-R	Porsche M97/74 4.0 L Flat-6	9	(Austria) Andreas Zuber	5
(Spain) Sunred	Ford GT GT3	Ford Cammer 5.0 L V8	10	(Serbia) Miloš Pavlović	1–6
(Spain) Sunred	Ford GT GT3	Ford Cammer 5.0 L V8	10	(Italy) Matteo Cressoni	1–5
(Spain) Sunred	Ford GT GT3	Ford Cammer 5.0 L V8	10	(Austria) Andreas Zuber	6
(Spain) Sunred	Ford GT GT3	Ford Cammer 5.0 L V8	10	(France) Benjamin Lariche	7–9
(Spain) Sunred	Ford GT GT3	Ford Cammer 5.0 L V8	10	(India) Armaan Ebrahim	7
(Spain) Sunred	Ford GT GT3	Ford Cammer 5.0 L V8	10	(France) Laurent Groppi	8–9
(Germany) Vita4One Racing Team	BMW E89 Z4 GT3	BMW P65B44 4.4 L V8	17	(Austria) Mathias Lauda	All
(Germany) Vita4One Racing Team	BMW E89 Z4 GT3	BMW P65B44 4.4 L V8	17	(Austria) Nikolaus Mayr-Melnhof	All
(Germany) Vita4One Racing Team	BMW E89 Z4 GT3	BMW P65B44 4.4 L V8	18	(Germany) Michael Bartels	All
(Germany) Vita4One Racing Team	BMW E89 Z4 GT3	BMW P65B44 4.4 L V8	18	(Netherlands) Yelmer Buurman	All
(Germany) Reiter Engineering	Lamborghini Gallardo LP600+ GT3	Lamborghini CEH 5.2 L V10	24	(Germany) Albert von Thurn und Taxis	1–6
(Germany) Reiter Engineering	Lamborghini Gallardo LP600+ GT3	Lamborghini CEH 5.2 L V10	24	(Czech Republic) Tomáš Enge	1–4
(Germany) Reiter Engineering	Lamborghini Gallardo LP600+ GT3	Lamborghini CEH 5.2 L V10	24	(Slovakia) Štefan Rosina	5–6
(Germany) Reiter Engineering	Lamborghini Gallardo LP600+ GT3	Lamborghini CEH 5.2 L V10	24	(Netherlands) Jeroen Bleekemolen	8
(Germany) Reiter Engineering	Lamborghini Gallardo LP600+ GT3	Lamborghini CEH 5.2 L V10	24	(France) Mike Parisy	8
(Germany) Reiter Engineering	Lamborghini Gallardo LP600+ GT3	Lamborghini CEH 5.2 L V10	25	(Netherlands) Peter Kox	1–3, 5–6, 8–9
(Germany) Reiter Engineering	Lamborghini Gallardo LP600+ GT3	Lamborghini CEH 5.2 L V10	25	(Hong Kong) Darryl O'Young	1–6
(Germany) Reiter Engineering	Lamborghini Gallardo LP600+ GT3	Lamborghini CEH 5.2 L V10	25	(Slovakia) Štefan Rosina	4, 8–9
(Belgium) Belgian Audi Club Team WRT	Audi R8 LMS ultra	Audi CJJ 5.2 L V10	32	(Monaco) Stéphane Ortelli	1–8
(Belgium) Belgian Audi Club Team WRT	Audi R8 LMS ultra	Audi CJJ 5.2 L V10	32	(Belgium) Laurens Vanthoor	All
(Belgium) Belgian Audi Club Team WRT	Audi R8 LMS ultra	Audi CJJ 5.2 L V10	32	(United Kingdom) Adam Carroll	9
(Belgium) Belgian Audi Club Team WRT	Audi R8 LMS ultra	Audi CJJ 5.2 L V10	33	(United Kingdom) Oliver Jarvis	All
(Belgium) Belgian Audi Club Team WRT	Audi R8 LMS ultra	Audi CJJ 5.2 L V10	33	(Germany) Frank Stippler	All
(Germany) All-Inkl.com Münnich Motorsport	Mercedes-Benz SLS AMG GT3	Mercedes-Benz M159 6.2 L V8	37	(Germany) Thomas Jäger	All
(Germany) All-Inkl.com Münnich Motorsport	Mercedes-Benz SLS AMG GT3	Mercedes-Benz M159 6.2 L V8	37	(Netherlands) Nicky Pastorelli	All
(Germany) All-Inkl.com Münnich Motorsport	Mercedes-Benz SLS AMG GT3	Mercedes-Benz M159 6.2 L V8	38	(Germany) Marc Basseng	All
(Germany) All-Inkl.com Münnich Motorsport	Mercedes-Benz SLS AMG GT3	Mercedes-Benz M159 6.2 L V8	38	(Germany) Markus Winkelhock	All

- All entries use Pirelli tyres.

== Results and standings ==
=== Race results ===
Event	Circuit	Pole position	Qualifying Race Winner	Championship Race Winner	Report
1	(France) Nogaro	(Italy) No. 3 AF Corse	(Belgium) No. 32 Belgian Audi Club Team WRT	(Belgium) No. 32 Belgian Audi Club Team WRT	Report
1	(France) Nogaro	(Finland) Toni Vilander (Czech Republic) Filip Salaquarda	(Monaco) Stéphane Ortelli (Belgium) Laurens Vanthoor	(Monaco) Stéphane Ortelli (Belgium) Laurens Vanthoor	Report
2	(Belgium) Zolder	No. 9 Exim Bank Team China	(Germany) No. 18 Vita4One Racing Team	No. 9 Exim Bank Team China	Report
2	(Belgium) Zolder	(New Zealand) Matt Halliday (France) Mike Parisy	(Germany) Michael Bartels (Netherlands) Yelmer Buurman	(New Zealand) Matt Halliday (France) Mike Parisy	Report
3	(Spain) Navarra	(Germany) No. 25 Reiter Engineering	(France) No. 1 Hexis Racing	(France) No. 1 Hexis Racing	Report
3	(Spain) Navarra	(Netherlands) Peter Kox (Hong Kong) Darryl O'Young	(France) Frédéric Makowiecki (Netherlands) Stef Dusseldorp	(France) Frédéric Makowiecki (Netherlands) Stef Dusseldorp	Report
4	Slovakia Ring	(France) No. 1 Hexis Racing	(Italy) No. 3 AF Corse	(Germany) No. 18 Vita4One Racing Team	Report
4	Slovakia Ring	(France) Frédéric Makowiecki (Netherlands) Stef Dusseldorp	(Czech Republic) Filip Salaquarda (Finland) Toni Vilander	(Germany) Michael Bartels (Netherlands) Yelmer Buurman	Report
5	(Portugal) Algarve	(Italy) No. 3 AF Corse	(Germany) No. 38 All-Inkl.com Münnich Motorsport	(Germany) No. 37 All-Inkl.com Münnich Motorsport	Report
5	(Portugal) Algarve	(Finland) Toni Vilander (Czech Republic) Filip Salaquarda	(Germany) Marc Basseng (Germany) Markus Winkelhock	(Germany) Thomas Jäger (Netherlands) Nicky Pastorelli	Report
6	Slovakia Ring	(Germany) No. 18 Vita4One Racing Team	(Germany) No. 18 Vita4One Racing Team	(Germany) No. 18 Vita4One Racing Team	Report
6	Slovakia Ring	(Germany) Michael Bartels (Netherlands) Yelmer Buurman	(Germany) Michael Bartels (Netherlands) Yelmer Buurman	(Germany) Michael Bartels (Netherlands) Yelmer Buurman	Report
7	(Russia) Moscow	(France) No. 2 Hexis Racing	(Belgium) No. 32 Belgian Audi Club Team WRT	(France) No. 1 Hexis Racing	Report
7	(Russia) Moscow	(Portugal) Álvaro Parente (France) Grégoire Demoustier	(Monaco) Stéphane Ortelli (Belgium) Laurens Vanthoor	(France) Frédéric Makowiecki (Netherlands) Stef Dusseldorp	Report
8	(Germany) Nürburgring	(France) No. 1 Hexis Racing	(Germany) No. 25 Reiter Engineering	(Italy) No. 3 AF Corse	Report
8	(Germany) Nürburgring	(France) Frédéric Makowiecki (Netherlands) Stef Dusseldorp	(Netherlands) Peter Kox (Slovakia) Štefan Rosina	(Finland) Toni Vilander (Czech Republic) Filip Salaquarda	Report
9	(United Kingdom) Donington Park	(Belgium) No. 32 Belgian Audi Club Team WRT	(France) No. 1 Hexis Racing	(France) No. 1 Hexis Racing	Report
9	(United Kingdom) Donington Park	(United Kingdom) Adam Carroll (Belgium) Laurens Vanthoor	(France) Frédéric Makowiecki (Netherlands) Stef Dusseldorp	(France) Frédéric Makowiecki (Netherlands) Stef Dusseldorp	Report

=== Championship standings ===
Championship points were awarded for the first six positions in each Qualifying Race and for the first ten positions in each Championship Race. Entries were required to complete 75% of the winning car's race distance in order to be classified and earn points. Individual drivers were required to participate for a minimum of 25 minutes in order to earn championship points in any race.

Points System
Race Type	Position									
Race Type	1st	2nd	3rd	4th	5th	6th	7th	8th	9th	10th
Qualifying Race	8	6	4	3	2	1	0	0	0	0
Championship Race	25	18	15	12	10	8	6	4	2	1

==== Drivers' Championship ====
Pos.	Driver	Team	NOG (France)		ZOL (Belgium)		NAV (Spain)		SVK (Slovakia)		ALG (Portugal)		SVK (Slovakia)		MSC (Russia)		NÜR (Germany)		DON (United Kingdom)		Total
Pos.	Driver	Team	QR	CR	QR	CR	QR	CR	QR	CR	QR	CR	QR	CR	QR	CR	QR	CR	QR	CR	Total
1	(Germany) Marc Basseng (Germany) Markus Winkelhock	(Germany) All-Inkl.com Münnich Motorsport	6	3	6	9	5	2	4	3	1	2	3	2	2	5	3	2	5	EX	145
2	(Netherlands) Stef Dusseldorp (France) Frédéric Makowiecki	(France) Hexis Racing	DNS	Ret	4	5	1	1	9	2	4	3	8	Ret	4	1	Ret	10	1	1	144
3	(Germany) Michael Bartels (Netherlands) Yelmer Buurman	(Germany) Vita4One Racing Team	11	10	1	2	3	4	3	1	2	5	1	1	10	7	4	4	9	9	144
4	(Belgium) Laurens Vanthoor	(Belgium) Belgian Audi Club Team WRT	1	1	12	6	9	10	11	6	10	6	5	5	1	4	2	6	2	4	122
5	(Monaco) Stéphane Ortelli	(Belgium) Belgian Audi Club Team WRT	1	1	12	6	9	10	11	6	10	6	5	5	1	4	2	6			104
6	(Germany) Thomas Jäger (Netherlands) Nicky Pastorelli	(Germany) All-Inkl.com Münnich Motorsport	7	4	2	4	6	3	8	10	6	1	4	8	5	8	6	8	6	6	100
7	(Czech Republic) Filip Salaquarda	(Italy) AF Corse	5	6	13	3	10	9	1	4	12	Ret	7	6	9	Ret	8	1	Ret	8	84
8	(United Kingdom) Oliver Jarvis (Germany) Frank Stippler	(Belgium) Belgian Audi Club Team WRT	2	2	11	10	8	8	6	5	3	Ret	Ret	4	3	3	7	Ret	Ret	7	81
9	(Finland) Toni Vilander	(Italy) AF Corse	5	6	13	3	10	9	1	4	12	Ret	7	6	9	Ret	8	1			80
10	(Netherlands) Peter Kox	(Germany) Reiter Engineering	8	7	8	13	4	7			Ret	4	6	7			1	3	4	2	78
11	(France) Grégoire Demoustier (Portugal) Álvaro Parente	(France) Hexis Racing	4	Ret	10	7	2	6	Ret	Ret	8	Ret	9	9	6	2	5	Ret	3	3	65
12	(Austria) Mathias Lauda (Austria) Nikolaus Mayr-Melnhof	(Germany) Vita4One Racing Team	12	11	5	14	7	5	10	7	5	8	2	3	7	10	9	5	8	Ret	56
13	(Slovakia) Štefan Rosina	(Germany) Reiter Engineering							13	11	13	Ret	11	Ret			1	3	4	2	44
14	(Italy) Francesco Castellacci (Belgium) Enzo Ide	(Italy) AF Corse	10	5	7	11	13	11	12	9	11	7	10	Ret	8	6	10	7	7	5	42
15	(France) Mike Parisy	Exim Bank Team China	9	9	3	1	11	12	5	8	9	10									40
15	(France) Mike Parisy	(Germany) Reiter Engineering															Ret	9			40
16	(New Zealand) Matt Halliday	Exim Bank Team China	9	9	3	1	11	12	5	8											37
17	(Hong Kong) Darryl O'Young	(Germany) Reiter Engineering	8	7	8	13	4	7	13	11	Ret	4	6	7							34
18	(Germany) Albert von Thurn und Taxis	(Germany) Reiter Engineering	3	8	Ret	8	12	14	2	Ret	13	Ret	11	Ret							18
19	(Czech Republic) Tomáš Enge	(Germany) Reiter Engineering	3	8	Ret	8	12	14	2	Ret											18
20	(United Kingdom) Adam Carroll	(Belgium) Belgian Audi Club Team WRT																	2	4	18
21	(Italy) Marco Cioci	(Italy) AF Corse																	Ret	8	4
22	(Serbia) Miloš Pavlović	(Spain) Sunred	15	14	DNS	16	Ret	Ret	7	12	7	9	DNS	Ret							2
23	(Italy) Matteo Cressoni	(Spain) Sunred	15	14	DNS	16	Ret	Ret	7	12	7	9									2
24	(France) Benjamin Lariche	Exim Bank Team China	14	15	Ret	17	Ret	15	DNS	DNS	DNS	DNS									2
24	(France) Benjamin Lariche	(Spain) Sunred													11	9	11	Ret	10	Ret	2
25	(India) Armaan Ebrahim	(Spain) Sunred													11	9					2
26	(Netherlands) Jeroen Bleekemolen	(Germany) Reiter Engineering															Ret	9			2
27	(Austria) Andreas Zuber	Valmon Racing Team Russia	13	13	Ret	15	15	13													1
27	(Austria) Andreas Zuber	Exim Bank Team China							DNS	DNS	9	10									1
27	(Austria) Andreas Zuber	(Spain) Sunred											DNS	Ret							1
28	(Belgium) Maxime Martin	Valmon Racing Team Russia	16	12	9	12	14	Ret													0
29	(Russia) Aleksey Vasilyev	Valmon Racing Team Russia	16	12	9	12															0
30	(France) Laurent Groppi	(Spain) Sunred															11	Ret	10	Ret	0
31	(Russia) Sergey Afanasyev	Valmon Racing Team Russia	13	13	Ret	15	15	13													0
32	(China) Ren Wei	Exim Bank Team China	14	15	Ret	17															0
33	(Russia) Leonid Machitski	Valmon Racing Team Russia					14	Ret													0
34	(France) Dino Lunardi	Exim Bank Team China					Ret	15			DNS	DNS									0
Pos.	Driver	Team	QR	CR	QR	CR	QR	CR	QR	CR	QR	CR	QR	CR	QR	CR	QR	CR	QR	CR	Total
Pos.	Driver	Team	NOG (France)		ZOL (Belgium)		NAV (Spain)		SVK (Slovakia)		ALG (Portugal)		SVK (Slovakia)		MSC (Russia)		NÜR (Germany)		DON (United Kingdom)		Total

Key
Colour	Result
Gold	Race winner
Silver	2nd place
Bronze	3rd place
Green	Points finish
Blue	Non-points finish
Blue	Non-classified finish (NC)
Purple	Did not finish (Ret)
Black	Disqualified (DSQ)
Black	Excluded (EX)
White	Did not start (DNS)
White	Race cancelled (C)
White	Withdrew (WD)
Blank	Did not participate

==== Teams' Championship ====
Pos.	Team	Manufacturer	No.	NOG (France)		ZOL (Belgium)		NAV (Spain)		SVK (Slovakia)		ALG (Portugal)		SVK (Slovakia)		MOS (Russia)		NÜR (Germany)		DON (United Kingdom)		Total
Pos.	Team	Manufacturer	No.	QR	CR	QR	CR	QR	CR	QR	CR	QR	CR	QR	CR	QR	CR	QR	CR	QR	CR	Total
1	(Germany) All-Inkl.com Münnich Motorsport	Mercedes-Benz	37	7	4	2	4	6	3	8	10	6	1	4	8	5	8	6	8	6	6	245
1	(Germany) All-Inkl.com Münnich Motorsport	Mercedes-Benz	38	6	3	6	9	5	2	4	3	1	2	3	2	2	5	3	2	5	EX	245
2	(France) Hexis Racing	McLaren	1	DNS	Ret	4	5	1	1	9	2	4	3	8	Ret	4	1	Ret	10	1	1	209
2	(France) Hexis Racing	McLaren	2	4	Ret	10	7	2	6	Ret	Ret	8	Ret	9	9	6	2	5	Ret	3	3	209
3	(Belgium) Belgian Audi Club Team WRT	Audi	32	1	1	12	6	9	10	11	6	10	6	5	5	1	4	2	6	2	4	203
3	(Belgium) Belgian Audi Club Team WRT	Audi	33	2	2	11	10	8	8	6	5	3	Ret	Ret	4	3	3	7	Ret	Ret	7	203
4	(Germany) Vita4One Racing Team	BMW	17	12	11	5	14	7	5	10	7	5	8	2	3	7	10	9	5	8	Ret	200
4	(Germany) Vita4One Racing Team	BMW	18	11	10	1	2	3	4	3	1	2	5	1	1	10	7	4	4	9	9	200
5	(Italy) AF Corse	Ferrari	3	5	6	13	3	10	9	1	4	12	Ret	7	6	9	Ret	8	1	Ret	8	126
5	(Italy) AF Corse	Ferrari	4	10	5	7	11	13	11	12	9	11	7	10	Ret	8	6	10	7	7	5	126
6	(Germany) Reiter Engineering	Lamborghini	24	3	8	Ret	8	12	14	2	Ret	13	Ret	11	Ret			Ret	9			98
6	(Germany) Reiter Engineering	Lamborghini	25	8	7	8	13	4	7	13	11	Ret	4	6	7			1	3	4	2	98
7	Exim Bank Team China	Porsche	8	14	15	Ret	17	Ret	Ret	DNS	DNS	DNS	DNS									38
7	Exim Bank Team China	Porsche	9	9	9	3	1	11	12	5	8	9	10									38
8	(Spain) Sunred	Ford	10	15	14	DNS	16	Ret	Ret	7	12	7	9	DNS	Ret	11	9	11	Ret	10	Ret	4
9	Valmon Racing Team Russia	Aston Martin	6	13	13	Ret	15	15	13													0
9	Valmon Racing Team Russia	Aston Martin	7	16	12	9	12	14	Ret													0
Pos.	Team	Manufacturer	Car	QR	CR	QR	CR	QR	CR	QR	CR	QR	CR	QR	CR	QR	CR	QR	CR	QR	CR	Total
Pos.	Team	Manufacturer	Car	NOG (France)		ZOL (Belgium)		NAV (Spain)		SVK (Slovakia)		ALG (Portugal)		SVK (Slovakia)		MOS (Russia)		NÜR (Germany)		DON (United Kingdom)		Total

Key
Colour	Result
Gold	Race winner
Silver	2nd place
Bronze	3rd place
Green	Points finish
Blue	Non-points finish
Blue	Non-classified finish (NC)
Purple	Did not finish (Ret)
Black	Disqualified (DSQ)
Black	Excluded (EX)
White	Did not start (DNS)
White	Race cancelled (C)
White	Withdrew (WD)
Blank	Did not participate
