= Alexey Vasilyev (racing driver) =

Russian racing driver

- Nationality: (Russia) Russian
- Born: Aleksey Igorevich Vasilyev; 13 January 1972 (age 54) Moscow, Soviet Union

FIA GT1 World Championship career
- Debut season: 2012
- Current team: Valmon Racing Team Russia
- Categorisation: FIA Silver (until 2015); FIA Bronze (2016–)
- Car number: 7
- Starts: 4
- Wins: 0
- Poles: 0
- Fastest laps: 0

Previous series
- 2007–11 2004–06, 2008 2005–06 2000–05 1996–97, 2000: Ferrari Challenge Europe; Le Mans Series; A1 Grand Prix; FIA GT Championship; Tourism-1600

Championship titles
- 1996–97, 2000: Tourism-1600
24 Hours of Le Mans career
- Years: 2004–2008
- Teams: Freisinger Motorsport, Cirtek Motorsport, Convers MenX Team, Snoras Spyker Squadron
- Best finish: 5th (2005)
- Class wins: 0

Aleksey Igorevich Vasilyev (Russian: Алексе́й И́горевич Васи́льев, IPA: [ɐlʲɪkˈsʲej ˈiɡərʲɪvʲɪtɕ vɐˈsʲɪlʲjɪf]; born 13 January 1972) is a Russian auto racing driver.

== Career ==
Vasilyev began karting in 1984 and raced primarily in his native Soviet Union for the majority of his early career, finishing as runner-up in the USSR championship in 1989. From 1990 to 2000 he raced in Russian touring car championships, winning three championship titles in the Tourism-1600 category.

In 2000, Vasilyev debuted internationally, competing in the N-GT class of the FIA GT Championship for Freisinger Motorsport alongside another Russian driver Nikolai Fomenko. After the 2001 season, he and Fomenko switched to RWS Motorsport for next two successive years. In 2002, Vasilyev scored his first point at Donington.

By 2004, Vasilyev returned to Freisinger Motorsport, scoring his first podium at Magny-Cours and placed sixth in the final championship standings; his best result in the N-GT class. Vasilyev also debuted with Freisinger in the new-for-2004 Le Mans Endurance Series, and the 24 Hours of Le Mans.

Vasilyev graduated to the new GT1 class in 2005 with Russian Age Racing, and again competed in the Le Mans Endurance Series, where he finished third in the GT class with the Convers Team. He finished in fifth place in the GT1 class at Le Mans; his best result at the race. Vasilyev also contested the British round of the inaugural A1 Grand Prix season.

In 2006, Vasilyev made his debut in the Dakar Rally, in the car class. He finished second in the Le Mans Series GT1 standings, before switching to the GT2 class in 2008, returning to the Le Mans Series with Snoras Spyker Squadron. He had competed in the Ferrari Challenge in 2007, and remained in the series until the end of 2011. In 2010 he participated under a Lithuanian racing licence, after his Russian licence was disqualified due to unsporting behaviour. Vasilyev signed with Valmon Racing Team Russia for the 2012 FIA GT1 World Championship season.

== Racing record ==
=== Career summary ===
Season	Series	Team	Races	Wins	Poles	F/Laps	Podiums	Points	Position
1996	Tourism-1600	Canopus	?	?	?	?	?	?	1st
1997	Tourism-1600	Miller-Pilot	?	?	?	?	?	?	1st
2000	Tourism-1600	TNK Racing	8	1	?	?	?	120	1st
2000	FIA GT Championship – N-GT	Freisinger Motorsport	2	0	0	0	0	0	NC
2001	FIA GT Championship – N-GT	Freisinger Racing	9	0	0	0	0	0	NC
2002	FIA GT Championship – N-GT	RWS Motorsport	10	0	0	0	0	1	47th
2003	FIA GT Championship – N-GT	RWS Yukos Motorsport	10	0	0	0	0	17	16th
2004	FIA GT Championship – N-GT	Freisinger Yukos Motorsport	11	0	0	0	3	48	6th
2004	24 Hours of Le Mans – GT	Freisinger Motorsport	1	0	0	0	0	N/A	NC
2004	Le Mans Endurance Series – GT	Freisinger Motorsport	1	0	0	0	0	N/A	NC
2005	FIA GT Championship – GT1	Russian Age Racing	9	0	0	0	0	5	34th
2005	Le Mans Endurance Series – GT1	Convers Team	5	0	0	0	3	31	3rd
2005	24 Hours of Le Mans – GT1	Cirtek Motorsport	1	0	0	0	0	N/A	5th
2005–06	A1 Grand Prix	A1 Team Russia	2	0	0	0	0	0	25th
2006	Le Mans Series – GT1	Convers MenX Team	5	0	0	0	3	28	2nd
2006	24 Hours of Le Mans – GT1	Convers MenX Team	1	0	0	0	0	N/A	NC
2007	Ferrari Challenge Europe – Trofeo Pirelli	HP-Exclusiv	14	0	?	?	?	142	8th
2007	24 Hours of Le Mans – GT1	Convers MenX Team	1	0	0	0	0	N/A	8th
2008	Le Mans Series – LMGT2	Snoras Spyker Squadron	4	0	0	0	0	13	8th
2008	24 Hours of Le Mans – GT2	Snoras Spyker Squadron	1	0	0	0	0	N/A	NC
2008	Ferrari Challenge Europe – Trofeo Pirelli	Ferrari Moscow	?	?	?	?	?	117	9th
2009	Ferrari Challenge Europe – Trofeo Pirelli	Ferrari Moscow	14	0	?	?	0	113	6th
2010	Ferrari Challenge Europe – Trofeo Pirelli	Ferrari Moscow	14	0	0	0	4	124	4th
2011	Ferrari Challenge Europe – Trofeo Pirelli	Ferrari Moscow	9	1	3	0	8	108	4th
2015	24H Series – A6	GT Russian Team							

=== 24 Hours of Le Mans results ===
Year	Team	Co-Drivers	Car	Class	Laps	Pos.	Class Pos.
2004	(Germany) Freisinger Motorsport	(Russia) Nikolai Fomenko (United Kingdom) Robert Nearn	Porsche 911 GT3-RSR	GT	65	DNF	DNF
2005	(United Kingdom) Cirtek Motorsport (Russia) Russian Age Racing (Russia) Convers Team	(Russia) Nikolai Fomenko (France) Christophe Bouchut	Ferrari 550-GTS Maranello	GT1	315	17th	5th
2006	(Russia) Convers MenX Team	(Czech Republic) Robert Pergl (Netherlands) Peter Kox	Ferrari 550-GTS Maranello	GT1	196	DNF	DNF
2007	(Russia) Convers MenX Team	(Czech Republic) Robert Pergl (Czech Republic) Tomáš Kostka	Ferrari 550-GTS Maranello	GT1	322	14th	8th
2008	(Netherlands) Snoras Spyker Squadron	(Germany) Ralf Kelleners (United Kingdom) Peter Dumbreck	Spyker C8 Laviolette GT2-R	GT2	43	DNF	DNF

=== Complete GT1 World Championship results ===
Year	Team	Car	1	2	3	4	5	6	7	8	9	10	11	12	13	14	15	16	17	18	Pos	Points	Ref
2012	Valmon Racing Team Russia	Aston Martin	NOG; QR; 16	NOG; CR; 12	ZOL; QR; 9	ZOL; CR; 12	NAV; QR	NAV; QR	SVK; QR	SVK; CR	ALG; QR	ALG; CR	SVK; QR	SVK; CR	MOS; QR	MOS; CR	NUR; QR	NUR; CR	DON; QR	DON; CR	29th	0	
