= Mike Parisy =

French racing driver (born 1984)

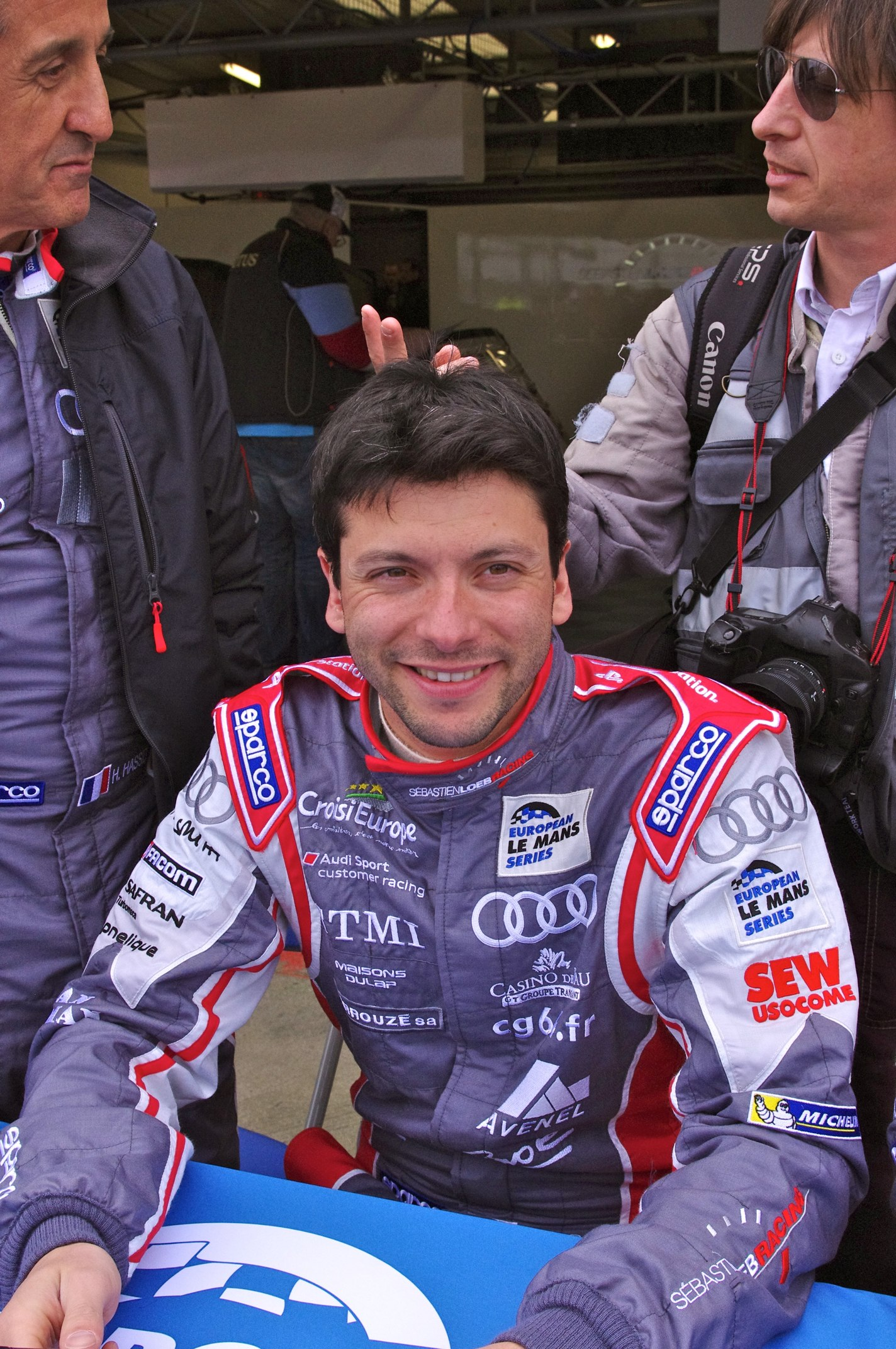
- Parisy in 2014.
- Nationality: (France) French
- Born: 8 October 1984 (age 42) Pau, France

FIA GT1 World Championship career
- Debut season: 2012
- Current team: Exim Bank Team China
- Categorisation: FIA Gold
- Car number: 9
- Starts: 10
- Wins: 1
- Poles: 0
- Fastest laps: 0

Previous series
- 2010–11 2010 2006–09 2003, 08–09 2005 2003–04 2003–04 2001–03: FIA GT3 European Championship; Racecar Euro Series; Porsche Carrera Cup France; French GT; Eurocup Mégane Trophy; French Supertouring; Formula France; French Formula Renault

Championship titles
- 2004: Formula France

Mike Parisy (born 8 October 1984 in Pau) is a French racing driver, who formerly competed in the FIA GT1 World Championship. In 2015 he is racing in the Blancpain GT Series for HTP Motorsport in a Bentley Continental.

== Career ==
After karting, Parisy began racing in single-seaters in French Formula Renault in 2001. In 2004 he won the Formula France title. In 2005, he raced in the Eurocup Mégane Trophy, before switching to the Porsche Carrera Cup France for 2006. He finished fourth in his first season, before finishing fifth, second and fifth again in the subsequent races. In 2008 and 2009, he also raced in the French GT Championship, coming third in the GT3 category in 2008 before winning the class the following year. In 2010, he raced in the FIA GT3 European Championship, driving a Graff Racing Corvette Z06R. He and teammate Joakim Lambotte finished the year third in the standings. The team changed to a Mercedes-Benz SLS AMG for 2011, and Parisy finished runner-up.

In 2012, Parisy raced in the FIA GT1 World Championship in a Porsche 997 GT3-R for Exim Bank Team China, run by Mühlner Motorsport.

== Racing record ==
=== FIA GT competition results ===
==== GT1 World Championship results ====
Year	Team	Car	1	2	3	4	5	6	7	8	9	10	11	12	13	14	15	16	17	18	Pos	Points
2012	Exim Bank Team China	Porsche	NOG; QR; 9	NOG; CR; 9	ZOL; QR; 3	ZOL; CR; 1	NAV; QR; 11	NAV; QR; 12	SVK; QR; 5	SVK; CR; 8	ALG; QR; 9	ALG; CR; 10	SVK; QR	SVK; CR	MOS; QR	MOS; CR					15th	40
2012	Reiter Engineering	Lamborghini															NUR; QR; Ret	NUR; CR; 9	BUD; QR	BUD; CR	15th	40

==== FIA GT Series results ====
Year	Class	Team	Car	1	2	3	4	5	6	7	8	9	10	11	12	Pos.	Points
2013	Pro	Sébastien Loeb Racing	McLaren MP4-12C GT3	NOG; QR; 10	NOG; CR; 11	ZOL; QR; 4	ZOL; CR; 4	ZAN; QR; 6	ZAN; QR; 15	SVK; QR; 4	SVK; CR; 7	NAV; QR; 5	NAV; CR; 2	BAK; QR; Ret	BAK; CR; Ret	8th	61

=== 24 Hours of Le Mans results ===
Year	Team	Co-Drivers	Car	Class	Laps	Pos.	Class Pos.
2015	(Taiwan) Team AAI	(Taiwan) Han-Chen Chen (France) Gilles Vannelet	Porsche 911 RSR	GTE; Am	320	35th	6th
