= 2012 FIA GT1 Navarra round =

Layout of the Circuito de Navarra

The 2012 FIA GT1 Navarra round was an auto racing event held at the Circuito de Navarra, Los Arcos, Spain on 26–27 May 2012, and was the third round of the 2012 FIA GT1 World Championship season. It was the third time the FIA GT1 World Championship visited Navarra, with the previous two events being won by a Lamborghini. Reiter Engineering won the 2010 event in a Murciélago and sought to make three Lamborghini victories in the three Navarra races with the Gallardo. Nicky Pastorelli was one of the race winners from 2011 and returned to defend his Navarra win for 2012 with All-Inkl.com Münnich Motorsport. The event was supported by the FIA GT3 European Championship.

== Qualifying ==
=== Qualifying result ===
For qualifying, Driver 1 participated in the first and third sessions while Driver 2 participated in only the second session. The fastest lap for each session is indicated with bold.

Pos	No.	Driver 1	Team	Session 1	Session 2	Session 3	Grid
Pos	No.	Driver 2	Team	Session 1	Session 2	Session 3	Grid
1	25	(Netherlands) Peter Kox	(Germany) Reiter Engineering	1:39.667	1:39.719	1:39.248	1
1	25	(Hong Kong) Darryl O'Young	(Germany) Reiter Engineering	1:39.667	1:39.719	1:39.248	1
2	18	(Germany) Michael Bartels	(Germany) BMW Team Vita4One	1:40.100	1:39.326	1:39.621	2
2	18	(Netherlands) Yelmer Buurman	(Germany) BMW Team Vita4One	1:40.100	1:39.326	1:39.621	2
3	17	(Austria) Nikolaus Mayr-Melnhof	(Germany) BMW Team Vita4One	1:39.784	1:39.829	1:39.928	3
3	17	(Austria) Mathias Lauda	(Germany) BMW Team Vita4One	1:39.784	1:39.829	1:39.928	3
4	37	(Netherlands) Nicky Pastorelli	(Germany) All-Inkl.com Münnich Motorsport	1:40.089	1:39.963	1:40.040	9
4	37	(Germany) Thomas Jäger	(Germany) All-Inkl.com Münnich Motorsport	1:40.089	1:39.963	1:40.040	9
5	9	(France) Mike Parisy	Exim Bank Team China	1:40.197	1:40.293	1:40.091	4
5	9	(New Zealand) Matt Halliday	Exim Bank Team China	1:40.197	1:40.293	1:40.091	4
6	32	(Monaco) Stéphane Ortelli	(Belgium) Belgian Audi Club Team WRT	1:40.172	1:40.205	1:40.170	5
6	32	(Belgium) Laurens Vanthoor	(Belgium) Belgian Audi Club Team WRT	1:40.172	1:40.205	1:40.170	5
7	2	(Portugal) Álvaro Parente	(France) Hexis Racing	1:40.293	1:38.802	1:40.437	6
7	2	(France) Grégoire Demoustier	(France) Hexis Racing	1:40.293	1:38.802	1:40.437	6
8	10	(Italy) Matteo Cressoni	(Spain) Sunred	1:40.796	1:40.032	1:40.640	7
8	10	(Serbia) Miloš Pavlović	(Spain) Sunred	1:40.796	1:40.032	1:40.640	7
9	3	(Finland) Toni Vilander	(Italy) AF Corse	1:40.004	1:40.295		8
9	3	(Czech Republic) Filip Salaquarda	(Italy) AF Corse	1:40.004	1:40.295		8
10	33	(United Kingdom) Oliver Jarvis	(Belgium) Belgian Audi Club Team WRT	1:40.217	1:40.339		10
10	33	(Germany) Frank Stippler	(Belgium) Belgian Audi Club Team WRT	1:40.217	1:40.339		10
11	4	(Belgium) Enzo Ide	(Italy) AF Corse	1:39.801	1:40.474		11
11	4	(Italy) Francesco Castellacci	(Italy) AF Corse	1:39.801	1:40.474		11
12	38	(Germany) Markus Winkelhock	(Germany) All-Inkl.com Münnich Motorsport	1:40.565	1:40.691		12
12	38	(Germany) Marc Basseng	(Germany) All-Inkl.com Münnich Motorsport	1:40.565	1:40.691		12
13	24	(Germany) Albert von Thurn und Taxis	(Germany) Reiter Engineering	1:40.309	1:40.957		13
13	24	(Czech Republic) Tomáš Enge	(Germany) Reiter Engineering	1:40.309	1:40.957		13
14	7	(Russia) Leonid Machitski	Valmon Racing Team Russia	1:40.207	1:43.277		14
14	7	(Russia) Alexey Vasilyev	Valmon Racing Team Russia	1:40.207	1:43.277		14
15	8	(France) Dino Lunardi	Exim Bank Team China	1:41.556			15
15	8	(France) Benjamin Lariche	Exim Bank Team China	1:41.556			15
16	1	(France) Frédéric Makowiecki	(France) Hexis Racing	No Time			16
16	1	(Netherlands) Stef Dusseldorp	(France) Hexis Racing	No Time			16
17	6	(Austria) Andreas Zuber	Valmon Racing Team Russia	No Time			17
17	6	(Russia) Sergey Afanasyev	Valmon Racing Team Russia	No Time			17

== Races ==
=== Qualifying Race ===
Pos	No.	Team	Drivers	Manufacturer	Laps	Time/Retired
1	1	(France) Hexis Racing	(France) Frédéric Makowiecki (Netherlands) Stef Dusseldorp	McLaren	36	
2	2	(France) Hexis Racing	(Portugal) Álvaro Parente (France) Grégoire Demoustier	McLaren	36	-3.598
3	18	(Germany) BMW Team Vita4One	(Germany) Michael Bartels (Netherlands) Yelmer Buurman	BMW	36	-21.694
4	25	(Germany) Reiter Engineering	(Netherlands) Peter Kox (Hong Kong) Darryl O'Young	Lamborghini	36	-22.516
5	38	(Germany) All-Inkl.com Münnich Motorsport	(Germany) Markus Winkelhock (Germany) Marc Basseng	Mercedes-Benz	36	-28.688
6	37	(Germany) All-Inkl.com Münnich Motorsport	(Netherlands) Nicky Pastorelli (Germany) Thomas Jäger	Mercedes-Benz	36	-30.406
7	17	(Germany) BMW Team Vita4One	(Austria) Nikolaus Mayr-Melnhof (Austria) Mathias Lauda	BMW	36	-36.685
8	33	(Belgium) Belgian Audi Club Team WRT	(United Kingdom) Oliver Jarvis (Germany) Frank Stippler	Audi	36	-37.345
9	32	(Belgium) Belgian Audi Club Team WRT	(Monaco) Stéphane Ortelli (Belgium) Laurens Vanthoor	Audi	36	-38.302
10	3	(Italy) AF Corse	(Finland) Toni Vilander (Czech Republic) Filip Salaquarda	Ferrari	36	-40.162
11	9	Exim Bank Team China	(France) Mike Parisy (New Zealand) Matt Halliday	Porsche	36	-40.565
12	24	(Germany) Reiter Engineering	(Germany) Albert von Thurn und Taxis (Czech Republic) Tomáš Enge	Lamborghini	36	-40.686
13	4	(Italy) AF Corse	(Belgium) Enzo Ide (Italy) Francesco Castellacci	Ferrari	36	-45.975
14	7	Valmon Racing Team Russia	(Russia) Leonid Machitski (Belgium) Maxime Martin	Aston Martin	36	-1:31.612
15	6	Valmon Racing Team Russia	(Austria) Andreas Zuber (Russia) Sergey Afanasyev	Aston Martin	36	-1:32.465
16 DNF	8	Exim Bank Team China	(France) Dino Lunardi (France) Benjamin Lariche	Porsche	20	Retired
17 DNF	10	(Spain) Sunred	(Italy) Matteo Cressoni (Serbia) Miloš Pavlović	Ford	13	Mechanical

=== Championship Race ===
Pos	No.	Team	Drivers	Manufacturer	Laps	Time/Retired
1	1	(France) Hexis Racing	(France) Frédéric Makowiecki (Netherlands) Stef Dusseldorp	McLaren	36	
2	38	(Germany) All-Inkl.com Münnich Motorsport	(Germany) Markus Winkelhock (Germany) Marc Basseng	Mercedes-Benz	36	-12.108
3	37	(Germany) All-Inkl.com Münnich Motorsport	(Netherlands) Nicky Pastorelli (Germany) Thomas Jäger	Mercedes-Benz	36	-13.426
4	2	(France) Hexis Racing	(Portugal) Álvaro Parente (France) Grégoire Demoustier	McLaren	36	-14.406
5	18	(Germany) BMW Team Vita4One	(Germany) Michael Bartels (Netherlands) Yelmer Buurman	BMW	36	-16.372
6	17	(Germany) BMW Team Vita4One	(Austria) Nikolaus Mayr-Melnhof (Austria) Mathias Lauda	BMW	36	-22.634
7	25	(Germany) Reiter Engineering	(Netherlands) Peter Kox (Hong Kong) Darryl O'Young	Lamborghini	36	-36.270
8	33	(Belgium) Belgian Audi Club Team WRT	(United Kingdom) Oliver Jarvis (Germany) Frank Stippler	Audi	36	-43.197
9	3	(Italy) AF Corse	(Finland) Toni Vilander (Czech Republic) Filip Salaquarda	Ferrari	36	-44.686
10	32	(Belgium) Belgian Audi Club Team WRT	(Monaco) Stéphane Ortelli (Belgium) Laurens Vanthoor	Audi	36	-44.999
11	4	(Italy) AF Corse	(Belgium) Enzo Ide (Italy) Francesco Castellacci	Ferrari	36	-46.474
12	9	Exim Bank Team China	(France) Mike Parisy (New Zealand) Matt Halliday	Porsche	36	-50.580
13	6	Valmon Racing Team Russia	(Austria) Andreas Zuber (Russia) Sergey Afanasyev	Aston Martin	35	-1 lap
14	24	(Germany) Reiter Engineering	(Germany) Albert von Thurn und Taxis (Czech Republic) Tomáš Enge	Lamborghini	35	-1 lap
15	8	Exim Bank Team China	(France) Dino Lunardi (France) Benjamin Lariche	Porsche	36	-2 laps
16 DNF	7	Valmon Racing Team Russia	(Russia) Leonid Machitski (Belgium) Maxime Martin	Aston Martin	19	Mechanical
17 DNF	10	(Spain) Sunred	(Italy) Matteo Cressoni (Serbia) Miloš Pavlović	Ford	3	Retired

FIA GT1 World Championship
Previous race: Zolder	2012 season	Next race: Slovakia
