= Benjamin Lariche =

French racing driver

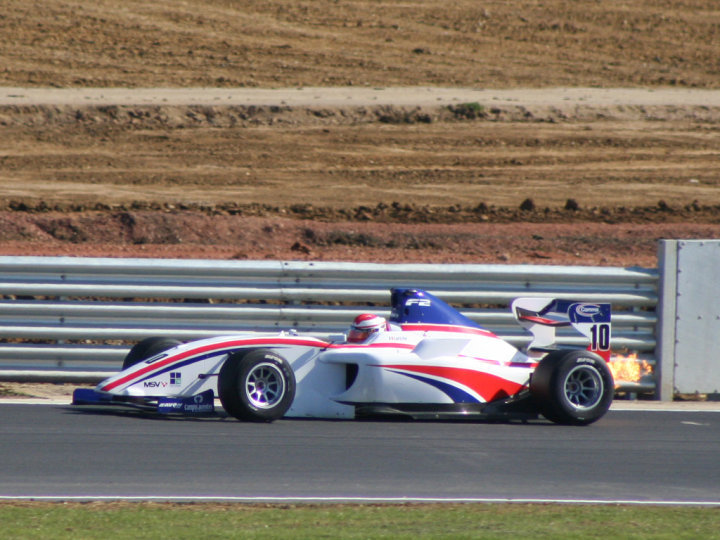
- Nationality: (France) French
- Born: 16 June 1987 (age 39) Narbonne, France

FIA Formula Two Championship career
- Debut season: 2010
- Current team: MotorSport Vision
- Categorisation: FIA Silver
- Car number: 28
- Starts: 24
- Wins: 0
- Poles: 0
- Fastest laps: 0
- Best finish: 14th in 2010

Previous series
- 2006 2007 2008-09: Formula Renault Campus France; French Formula Renault 2.0; Formula Renault 2.0 WEC

Benjamin Lariche (born 16 June 1987 in Narbonne, France) is a French professional racing driver who competes for Team Speedcar in the GT4 European Series, having been crowned champion in the 2025 season.

In 2010 and 2011, Lariche competed in the FIA Formula Two Championship.

== Racing record ==
=== Career summary ===
| Season | Series | Team | Races | Wins | Poles | F/Laps | Podiums | Points | Position |
|---|---|---|---|---|---|---|---|---|---|
| 2006 | Formula Renault Campus France | La Filiere FFSA | 13 | 0 | 0 | 0 | 1 | 43 | 10th |
| 2007 | French Formula Renault 2.0 | Graff Racing | 13 | 0 | 0 | 0 | 0 | 1 | 19th |
| 2008 | Formula Renault 2.0 WEC | Pole Services | 15 | 1 | 0 | 0 | 1 | 18 | 10th |
| 2008 | Formula Renault 2.0 Eurocup | Pole Services | 2 | 0 | 0 | 0 | 0 | 0 | 44th |
| 2008 | Fórmula Júnior FR2.0 Portugal | Pole Services | 1 | 1 | 1 | 1 | 1 | 17 | 12th |
| 2009 | Formula Renault 2.0 WEC | Pole Services | 14 | 0 | 0 | 0 | 0 | 35 | 10th |
| 2009 | Formula Renault 2.0 Eurocup | Pole Services | 6 | 0 | 0 | 0 | 0 | 0 | 35th |
| 2010 | FIA Formula Two Championship | MotorSport Vision | 18 | 0 | 0 | 0 | 0 | 33 | 14th |
| 2011 | FIA Formula Two Championship | MotorSport Vision | 16 | 0 | 0 | 0 | 0 | 15 | 16th |
| 2012 | FIA GT1 World Championship | Exim Bank Team China/ Sunred | 16 | 0 | 0 | 0 | 0 | 2 | 24th |
| 2013 | Porsche Carrera Cup France | Racing Technology | 12 | 0 | 0 | 0 | 0 | 47 | 14th |
| 2014 | Blancpain Endurance Series - Pro-Am | TDS Racing | 5 | 0 | 0 | 0 | 0 | 25 | 12th |
| 2015 | French GT Championship | Le Mans GT by Courage | 14 | 2 | 0 | 0 | 2 | 101 | 9th |
| 2016 | French GT Championship | Strategic | 1 | 0 | 0 | 0 | 0 | 0 | NC |
| 2017 | GT4 European Series Southern Cup - Pro-Am | Speed Car / AT Events | 12 | 1 | 0 | 0 | 5 | 130 | **2nd** |
| 2018 | French GT4 Cup - Pro-Am | Speed Car | 12 | 2 | 0 | 0 | 5 | 135 | 4th |
| 2019 | French GT4 Cup - Pro-Am | Speed Car | 10 | 0 | 0 | 0 | 3 | 84 | 5th |
| 2019 | GT4 South European Series - Pro-Am | Team Speed Car | 2 | 0 | 0 | 0 | 1 | 18 | 7th |
| 2019 | GT4 European Series - Silver | Team Speedcar | 1 | 0 | 0 | 0 | 0 | 0 | NC |
| 2020 | French GT4 Cup - Silver | Speed Car | 12 | 1 | 1 | 0 | 6 | 188 | **3rd** |
| 2021 | GT4 European Series - Silver | Team Speedcar | 12 | 0 | 0 | 0 | 0 | 55 | 12th |
| 2021 | French GT4 Cup - Pro-Am | Team Speedcar | 2 | 0 | 0 | 0 | 0 | 0 | NC |
| 2022 | GT4 European Series - Silver | Team Speedcar | 10 | 0 | 1 | 1 | 2 | 95 | 7th |
| 2022 | French GT4 Cup - Pro-Am | Team Speedcar | 12 | 0 | 0 | 1 | 0 | 5 | 21st |
| 2023 | GT4 European Series - Silver | Team Speedcar | 12 | 1 | 2 | 1 | 8 | 145 | **2nd** |
| 2024 | GT4 European Series - Silver | Team Speedcar | 12 | 4 | 4 | 1 | 7 | 180 | **2nd** |
| 2025 | GT4 European Series - Silver | Team Speedcar | | | | | | | |
| 2026 | GT4 European Series - Silver | Team Speedcar | | | | | | | |

* Season still in progress

=== Complete Eurocup Formula Renault 2.0 results ===
(key) (Races in bold indicate pole position; races in italics indicate fastest lap)

| Year | Entrant | 1 | 2 | 3 | 4 | 5 | 6 | 7 | 8 | 9 | 10 | 11 | 12 | 13 | 14 | DC | Points |
|---|---|---|---|---|---|---|---|---|---|---|---|---|---|---|---|---|---|
| 2008 | Pole Services | SPA; 1 | SPA; 2 | SIL; 1; 26 | SIL; 2; 17 | HUN; 1 | HUN; 2 | NÜR; 1 | NÜR; 2 | LMS; 1 | LMS; 2 | EST; 1 | EST; 2 | CAT; 1 | CAT; 2 | 44th | 0 |

=== Complete Eurocup Formula Renault 2.0 results ===
(key) (Races in bold indicate pole position; races in italics indicate fastest lap)

| Year | Entrant | 1 | 2 | 3 | 4 | 5 | 6 | 7 | 8 | 9 | 10 | 11 | 12 | 13 | 14 | DC | Points |
|---|---|---|---|---|---|---|---|---|---|---|---|---|---|---|---|---|---|
| 2009 | Pole Services | CAT; 1; 21 | CAT; 2; 15 | SPA; 1 | SPA; 2 | HUN; 1 | HUN; 2 | SIL; 1 | SIL; 2 | LMS; 1 | LMS; 2 | NÜR; 1; 18 | NÜR; 2; 17 | ALC; 1; 22 | ALC; 2; 23 | 35th | 0 |

=== Complete FIA Formula Two Championship results ===
(key) (Races in bold indicate pole position) (Races in italics indicate fastest lap)

| Year | 1 | 2 | 3 | 4 | 5 | 6 | 7 | 8 | 9 | 10 | 11 | 12 | 13 | 14 | 15 | 16 | 17 | 18 | Pos | Points |
|---|---|---|---|---|---|---|---|---|---|---|---|---|---|---|---|---|---|---|---|---|
| 2010 | SIL; 1; 10 | SIL; 2; 19 | MAR; 1; 9 | MAR; 2; 10 | MON; 1; 8 | MON; 2; 9 | ZOL; 1 Ret | ZOL; 2; 9 | ALG; 1; 8 | ALG; 2; 10 | BRH; 1; 14 | BRH; 2; 10 | BRN; 1; 10 | BRN; 2; 7 | OSC; 1 Ret | OSC; 2; 11 | VAL; 1; 6 | VAL; 2; 14 | 14th | 33 |
| 2011 | SIL; 1; 13 | SIL; 2; 10 | MAG; 1; 11 | MAG; 2; 13 | SPA; 1; 20 | SPA; 2 Ret | NÜR; 1; 13 | NÜR; 2; 12 | BRH; 1 Ret | BRH; 2; 8 | SPL; 1; 8 | SPL; 2; 8 | MON; 1; 13 | MON; 2; 10 | CAT; 1; 13 | CAT; 2; 10 | | | 16th | 15 |

=== Complete GT1 World Championship results ===
| Year | Team | Car | 1 | 2 | 3 | 4 | 5 | 6 | 7 | 8 | 9 | 10 | 11 | 12 | 13 | 14 | 15 | 16 | 17 | 18 | Pos | Points |
|---|---|---|---|---|---|---|---|---|---|---|---|---|---|---|---|---|---|---|---|---|---|---|
| 2012 | Exim Bank Team China | Porsche | NOG; QR; 14 | NOG; CR; 15 | ZOL; QR; Ret | ZOL; CR; 17 | NAV; QR; Ret | NAV; QR; 15 | SVK; QR; DNS | SVK; CR; DNS | ALG; QR; DNS | ALG; CR; DNS | SVK; QR | SVK; CR | | | | | | | **24th** | **2** |
| 2012 | Sunred | Ford | | | | | | | | | | | | | MOS; QR; 11 | MOS; CR; 9 | NUR; QR; 11 | NUR; CR; Ret | DON; QR; 10 | DON; CR; Ret | **24th** | **2** |

=== Complete GT4 European Series results ===
(key) (Races in bold indicate pole position) (Races in italics indicate fastest lap)

| Year | Team | Car | Class | 1 | 2 | 3 | 4 | 5 | 6 | 7 | 8 | 9 | 10 | 11 | 12 | Pos | Points |
|---|---|---|---|---|---|---|---|---|---|---|---|---|---|---|---|---|---|
| 2019 | Team Speedcar | Alpine A110 GT4 | Silver | IMO; 1 | IMO; 2 | BRH; 1 | BRH; 2 | LEC; 1 DNS | LEC; 2 Ret | MIS; 1 | MIS; 2 | ZAN; 1 | ZAN; 2 | NÜR; 1 | NÜR; 2 | NC | 0 |
| 2021 | Team Speedcar | Audi R8 LMS GT4 Evo | Silver | MNZ; 1; 11 | MNZ; 2; 14 | LEC; 1; 10 | LEC; 2; 11 | ZAN; 1; 15 | ZAN; 2; 15 | SPA; 1; 12 | SPA; 2; 10 | NÜR; 1; 5 | NÜR; 2; 9 | CAT; 1; 37† | CAT; 2; 9 | 12th | 55 |
| 2022 | Team Speedcar | Audi R8 LMS GT4 Evo | Silver | IMO; 1 WD | IMO; 2 WD | LEC; 1 Ret | LEC; 2; 4 | MIS; 1; 13 | MIS; 2; 22 | SPA; 1; 7 | SPA; 2; 8 | **HOC**; **1**; 4 | HOC; 2; 2 | CAT; 1; 12 | CAT; 2; 10 | 7th | 95 |
| 2023 | Team Speedcar | Audi R8 LMS GT4 Evo | Silver | MNZ; 1; 1 | MNZ; 2 Ret | LEC; 1; 3 | LEC; 2 Ret | SPA; 1; 54 | SPA; 2; 2 | **MIS**; **1**; 2 | **MIS**; **2**; 3 | HOC; 1; 42† | HOC; 2; 2 | CAT; 1; 2 | CAT; 2; 3 | 2nd | 145 |
| 2024 | Team Speedcar | Audi R8 LMS GT4 Evo | Silver | LEC; 1; 5 | LEC; 2; 42† | MIS; 1; 2 | **MIS**; **2**; 2 | SPA; 1; 2 | SPA; 2; 16 | HOC; 1; 4 | HOC; 2; 39† | **MNZ**; **1**; 1 | **MNZ**; **2**; 1 | JED; 1; 1 | **JED**; **2**; 1 | 2nd | 180 |
| 2025 | Team Speedcar | Audi R8 LMS GT4 Evo | Silver | LEC; 1; 7 | LEC; 2; 1 | ZAN; 1; 2 | **ZAN**; **2**; 1 | SPA; 1; 2 | SPA; 2; 3 | MIS; 1; 1 | **MIS**; **2**; 1 | NÜR; 1 Ret | NÜR; 2; 8 | CAT; 1; 6 | CAT; 2; 6 | 1st | 181 |
