= Stef Dusseldorp =

Dutch racing driver

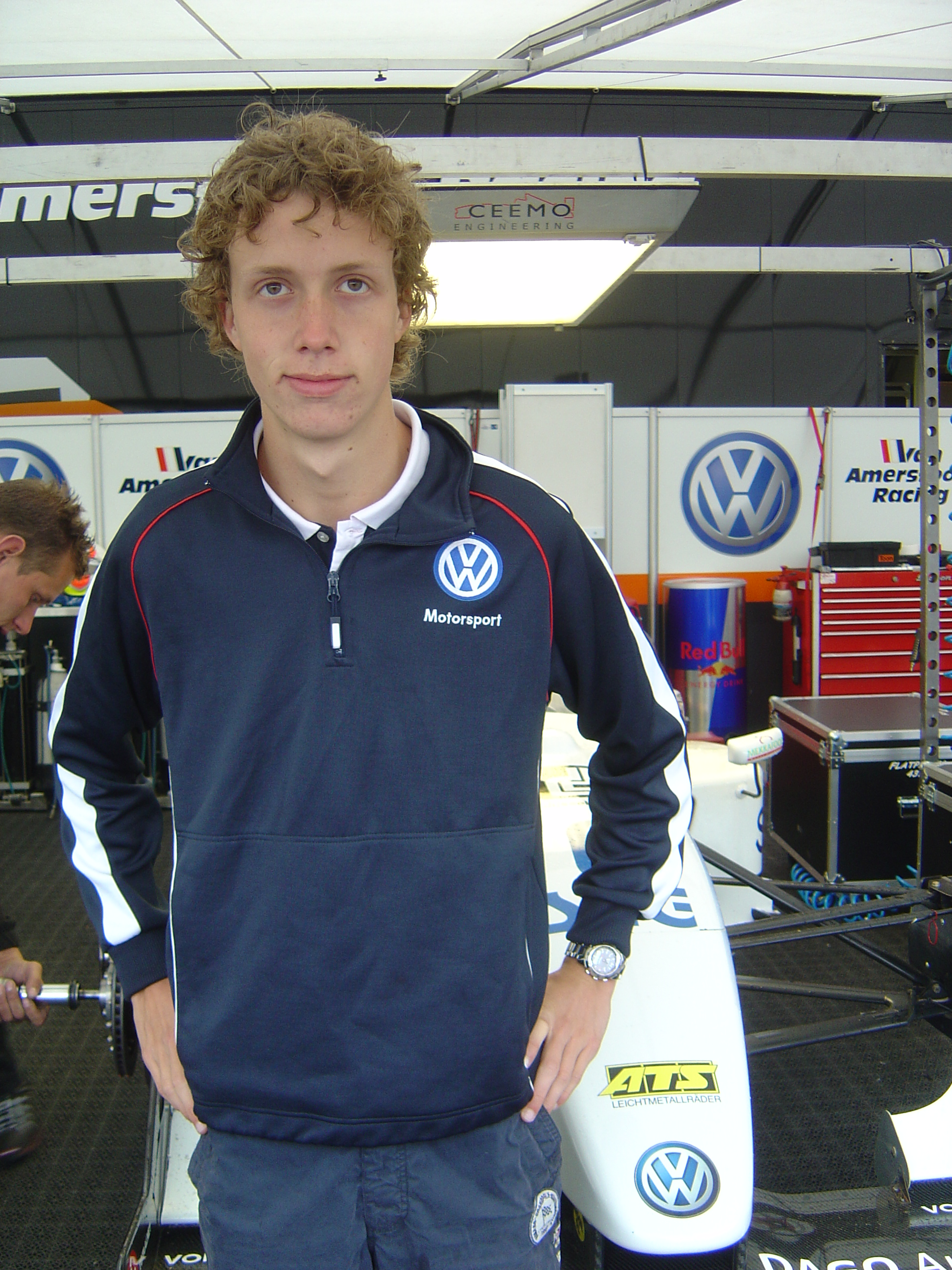
- Dusseldorp in 2009.
- Nationality: (Netherlands) Dutch
- Born: 27 September 1989 (age 37) Winterswijk, Netherlands

German Formula Three career
- Current team: Van Amersfoort Racing
- Categorisation: FIA Gold
- Car number: 1
- Starts: 20
- Wins: 3
- Poles: 1
- Fastest laps: 4
- Best finish: 2nd in 2009

Previous series
- 2008 2008 2007–08: Italian Formula Renault 2.0; Formula 2000 Light; Formula Renault 2.0 NEC

Stef Dusseldorp (born 27 September 1989 in Winterswijk, Gelderland) is a Dutch racing driver.

Dusseldorp started a career in formula cars in 2007, having competed in series such as Formula Renault 2.0 Northern European Cup (fifth in 2008) and the German Formula Three Championship (second in 2009, fourth in 2010).

Dusseldorp switched to the FIA GT1 World Championship for 2011, where he finished seventh driving an Aston Martin DBR9 for Hexis Racing together with Clivio Piccione, collecting a win and four podiums. In 2012, he and Frédéric Makowiecki collected five wins and resulted vice-champion, now driving a McLaren MP4-12C. The driver switched to the Blancpain Endurance Series for 2013, continuing as a Hexis driver.

== Racing record ==
=== Complete Formula Renault 2.0 NEC results ===
(key) (Races in bold indicate pole position) (Races in italics indicate fastest lap)

Year	Entrant	1	2	3	4	5	6	7	8	9	10	11	12	13	14	15	16	DC	Points
2007	Van Amersfoort Racing	ZAN; 1; 9	ZAN; 2; 8	OSC; 1; 10	OSC; 2; 20	ASS; 1; 23†	ASS; 2; 9	ZOL; 1; 11	ZOL; 1; 15	NUR; 1; 16	NUR; 2; 15	OSC; 1	OSC; 2	SPA; 1	SPA; 2	HOC; 1	HOC; 2	13th	77
2008	Van Amersfoort Racing	HOC; 1; 5	HOC; 2; 2	ZAN; 1; 13	ZAN; 2; 5	ALA; 1; 4	ALA; 2; 9	OSC; 1 Ret	OSC; 2; 9	ASS; 1 Ret	ASS; 2; 6	ZOL; 1; 1	ZOL; 2; 2	NÜR; 1; 4	NÜR; 2; 5	SPA; 1; 14	SPA; 2; 11	4th	224

=== Complete GT1 World Championship results ===
Year	Team	Car	1	2	3	4	5	6	7	8	9	10	11	12	13	14	15	16	17	18	19	20	Pos	Points
2011	Hexis AMR	Aston Martin	ABU; QR; 5	ABU; CR; 1	ZOL; QR; 6	ZOL; CR; 6	ALG; QR; 13	ALG; CR; Ret	SAC; QR; 2	SAC; CR; 11	SIL; QR; 5	SIL; CR; 4	NAV; QR; 10	NAV; CR; 8	PRI; QR; Ret	PRI; CR; 11	ORD; QR; 4	ORD; CR; 3	BEI; QR; 5	BEI; CR; Ret	SAN; QR; 8	SAN; CR; 3	7th	95
2012	Hexis Racing	McLaren	NOG; QR; DNS	NOG; CR; Ret	ZOL; QR; 4	ZOL; CR; 5	NAV; QR; 1	NAV; QR; 1	SVK; QR; 9	SVK; CR; 2	ALG; QR; 4	ALG; CR; 3	SVK; QR; 8	SVK; CR; Ret	MOS; QR; 4	MOS; CR; 1	NUR; QR; Ret	NUR; CR; 10	DON; QR; 1	DON; CR; 1			**2nd**	**144**

* Season still in progress.
