= 2012 First FIA GT1 Slovakia round =

Layout of the Automotodróm Slovakia Ring

The 2012 First FIA GT1 Slovakia round was an auto racing event held at the Automotodróm Slovakia Ring in Orechová Potôň, Slovakia that took place June 8th through June 10th in 2012. It was the fourth round of the 2012 FIA GT1 World Championship season. It was the first time the GT1 category visited the Slovakia Ring circuit. Valmon Racing Team Russia did not take part in the event.

The circuit was modified following the 2011 FIA GT3 races, which saw several cars become airborne as they crossed over the crest between turns two and three. In response to this, event organisers added a temporary tyre chicane on the approach to the crest prior to the race. In addition to this, organizers also designated the section of circuit from the second turn to the tyre chicane as a permanent yellow-flag area, banning overtaking on the approach to the chicane.

== Qualifying ==
=== Qualifying result ===
For qualifying, Driver 1 participates in the first and third sessions while Driver 2 participates in only the second session. The fastest lap for each session is indicated with bold.

Pos	No.	Driver 1	Team	Session 1	Session 2	Session 3	Grid
Pos	No.	Driver 2	Team	Session 1	Session 2	Session 3	Grid
1	1	(France) Frédéric Makowiecki	(France) Hexis Racing	2:03.423	2:02.628	2:01.652	1
1	1	(Netherlands) Stef Dusseldorp	(France) Hexis Racing	2:03.423	2:02.628	2:01.652	1
2	18	(Germany) Michael Bartels	(Germany) BMW Team Vita4One	2:02.901	2:02.481	2:01.934	2
2	18	(Netherlands) Yelmer Buurman	(Germany) BMW Team Vita4One	2:02.901	2:02.481	2:01.934	2
3	33	(United Kingdom) Oliver Jarvis	(Belgium) Belgian Audi Club Team WRT	2:02.937	2:02.734	2:02.345	3
3	33	(Germany) Frank Stippler	(Belgium) Belgian Audi Club Team WRT	2:02.937	2:02.734	2:02.345	3
4	3	(Finland) Toni Vilander	(Italy) AF Corse	2:03.453	2:02.479	2:03.001	4
4	3	(Czech Republic) Filip Salaquarda	(Italy) AF Corse	2:03.453	2:02.479	2:03.001	4
5	4	(Belgium) Enzo Ide	(Italy) AF Corse	2:06.024	2:02.703	2:04.833	5
5	4	(Italy) Francesco Castellacci	(Italy) AF Corse	2:06.024	2:02.703	2:04.833	5
6	2	(Portugal) Álvaro Parente	(France) Hexis Racing	2:05.775	2:02.769	2:05.083	6
6	2	(France) Grégoire Demoustier	(France) Hexis Racing	2:05.775	2:02.769	2:05.083	6
7	32	(Monaco) Stéphane Ortelli	(Belgium) Belgian Audi Club Team WRT	2:03.123	2:02.724	No Time	7
7	32	(France) Grégoire Demoustier	(Belgium) Belgian Audi Club Team WRT	2:03.123	2:02.724	No Time	7
8	10	(Serbia) Miloš Pavlović	(Spain) Sunred	2:05.188	2:02.417	No Time	14
8	10	(Italy) Matteo Cressoni	(Spain) Sunred	2:05.188	2:02.417	No Time	14
9	17	(Austria) Mathias Lauda	(Germany) BMW Team Vita4One	2:04.213	2:02.861		8
9	17	(Austria) Nikolaus Mayr-Melnhof	(Germany) BMW Team Vita4One	2:04.213	2:02.861		8
10	38	(Germany) Marc Basseng	(Germany) All-Inkl.com Münnich Motorsport	2:03.423	2:02.984		9
10	38	(Germany) Markus Winkelhock	(Germany) All-Inkl.com Münnich Motorsport	2:03.423	2:02.984		9
11	9	(New Zealand) Matt Halliday	Exim Bank Team China	2:04.272	2:03.080		10
11	9	(France) Mike Parisy	Exim Bank Team China	2:04.272	2:03.080		10
12	24	(Czech Republic) Tomáš Enge	(Germany) Reiter Engineering	2:02.599	2:03.198		11
12	24	(Germany) Albert von Thurn und Taxis	(Germany) Reiter Engineering	2:02.599	2:03.198		11
13	25	(Slovakia) Štefan Rosina	(Germany) Reiter Engineering	2:03.143	2:03.331		12
13	25	(Czech Republic) Tomáš Enge	(Germany) Reiter Engineering	2:03.143	2:03.331		12
14	37	(Netherlands) Nicky Pastorelli	(Germany) All-Inkl.com Münnich Motorsport	2:03.646	2:04.881		13
14	37	(Germany) Thomas Jäger	(Germany) All-Inkl.com Münnich Motorsport	2:03.646	2:04.881		13
15	8	(France) Benjamin Lariche	Exim Bank Team China	No Time			15
15	8	(Austria) Andreas Zuber	Exim Bank Team China	No Time			15

== Races ==
=== Qualifying Race ===
Pos	No.	Team	Drivers	Manufacturer	Laps	Time/Retired
1	3	(Italy) AF Corse	(Finland) Toni Vilander (Czech Republic) Filip Salaquarda	Ferrari	25	
2	24	(Germany) Reiter Engineering	(Czech Republic) Tomáš Enge (Germany) Albert von Thurn und Taxis	Lamborghini	25	-4.568
3	18	(Germany) BMW Team Vita4One	(Germany) Michael Bartels (Netherlands) Yelmer Buurman	BMW	25	-16.106
4	38	(Germany) All-Inkl.com Münnich Motorsport	(Germany) Marc Basseng (Germany) Markus Winkelhock	Mercedes-Benz	25	-19.777
5	9	Exim Bank Team China	(New Zealand) Matt Halliday (France) Mike Parisy	Porsche	25	-26.693
6	33	(Belgium) Belgian Audi Club Team WRT	(United Kingdom) Oliver Jarvis (Germany) Frank Stippler	Audi	25	-37.847
7	10	(Spain) Sunred	(Serbia) Miloš Pavlović (Italy) Matteo Cressoni	Ford	25	-39.986
8	37	(Germany) All-Inkl.com Münnich Motorsport	(Netherlands) Nicky Pastorelli (Germany) Thomas Jäger	Mercedes-Benz	25	-51.851
9	1	(France) Hexis Racing	(France) Frédéric Makowiecki (Netherlands) Stef Dusseldorp	McLaren	25	-1:05.548
10	17	(Germany) BMW Team Vita4One	(Austria) Mathias Lauda (Austria) Nikolaus Mayr-Melnhof	BMW	25	-1:18.101
11	32	(Belgium) Belgian Audi Club Team WRT	(Monaco) Stéphane Ortelli (Belgium) Laurens Vanthoor	Audi	25	-1:21.780
12	4	(Italy) AF Corse	(Belgium) Enzo Ide (Italy) Francesco Castellacci	Ferrari	25	-1:23.159
13 DNF	25	(Germany) Reiter Engineering	(Slovakia) Štefan Rosina (Hong Kong) Darryl O'Young	Lamborghini	20	Retired
14 DNF	2	(France) Hexis Racing	(Portugal) Álvaro Parente (France) Grégoire Demoustier	McLaren	15	Engine
DNS	8	Exim Bank Team China	(France) Benjamin Lariche (Austria) Andreas Zuber	Porsche	-	Mechanical

=== Championship Race ===
Pos	No.	Team	Drivers	Manufacturer	Laps	Time/Retired
1	18	(Germany) BMW Team Vita4One	(Germany) Michael Bartels (Netherlands) Yelmer Buurman	BMW	29	
2	1	(France) Hexis Racing	(France) Frédéric Makowiecki (Netherlands) Stef Dusseldorp	McLaren	29	-2.951
3	38	(Germany) All-Inkl.com Münnich Motorsport	(Germany) Marc Basseng (Germany) Markus Winkelhock	Mercedes-Benz	29	-5.600
4	3	(Italy) AF Corse	(Finland) Toni Vilander (Czech Republic) Filip Salaquarda	Ferrari	29	-17.260
5	33	(Belgium) Belgian Audi Club Team WRT	(United Kingdom) Oliver Jarvis (Germany) Frank Stippler	Audi	29	-30.511
6	32	(Belgium) Belgian Audi Club Team WRT	(Monaco) Stéphane Ortelli (Belgium) Laurens Vanthoor	Audi	29	-33.464
7	17	(Germany) BMW Team Vita4One	(Austria) Mathias Lauda (Austria) Nikolaus Mayr-Melnhof	BMW	29	-38.514
8	9	Exim Bank Team China	(New Zealand) Matt Halliday (France) Mike Parisy	Porsche	29	-47.568
9	4	(Italy) AF Corse	(Belgium) Enzo Ide (Italy) Francesco Castellacci	Ferrari	29	-50.789
10	37	(Germany) All-Inkl.com Münnich Motorsport	(Netherlands) Nicky Pastorelli (Germany) Thomas Jäger	Mercedes-Benz	29	-1:24.629
11	25	(Germany) Reiter Engineering	(Slovakia) Štefan Rosina (Hong Kong) Darryl O'Young	Lamborghini	29	-1:33.829
12	10	(Spain) Sunred	(Serbia) Miloš Pavlović (Italy) Matteo Cressoni	Ford	28	-1 lap
13 DNF	2	(France) Hexis Racing	(Portugal) Álvaro Parente (France) Grégoire Demoustier	McLaren	19	Retired
14 DNF	24	(Germany) Reiter Engineering	(Czech Republic) Tomáš Enge (Germany) Albert von Thurn und Taxis	Lamborghini	2	Contact
DNS	8	Exim Bank Team China	(France) Benjamin Lariche (Austria) Andreas Zuber	Porsche	-	Mechanical

FIA GT1 World Championship
Previous race: Navarra	2012 season	Next race: Algarve
