= Nikolaus Mayr-Melnhof =

Austrian racing driver (born 1978)

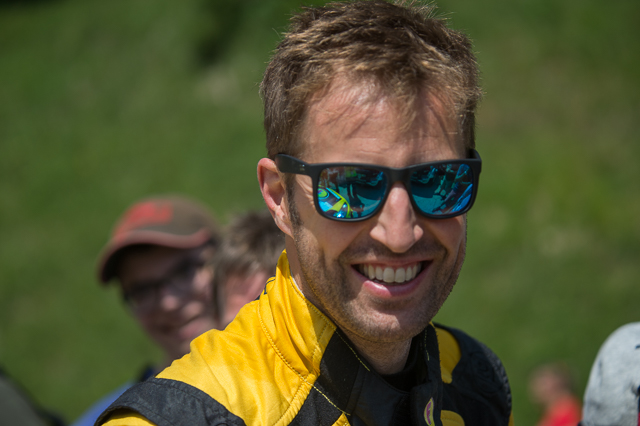
- Nationality: (Austria) Austrian
- Born: 9 November 1978 (age 47) Leoben, Austria

FIA GT1 World Championship career
- Debut season: 2012
- Current team: BMW Team Vita4One
- Categorisation: FIA Silver (until 2019); FIA Bronze (2024–)
- Car number: 17
- Starts: 14
- Wins: 0
- Poles: 0
- Fastest laps: 0
- Best finish: 12th in 2012

Previous series
- 2011 2008, 2010–11 2010: Blancpain Endurance Series; FIA GT3 European Championship; GT4 European Cup

Nikolaus "Niki" Mayr-Melnhof (born 9 November 1978) is an Austrian racing driver currently competing in the Blancpain Sprint Series for Phoenix Racing (Germany). He previously competed in the FIA GT1 World Championship for Vita4one Racing

== Early life and ancestry ==
Born in Leoben into the family that once belonged to an important Austrian nobility, Mayr-Melnhof is the youngest son of Count Franz Karl von Goëss, Freiherr Mayr von Melnhof-Saurau (b. 1949) and his wife, Countess Erzsébet Andrássy (b. 1947). His parents divorced in 1983.

== Career ==
In 2008, Mayr-Melnhof contested the GT4 European Cup in an Aston Martin V8 Vantage N24 run by the Jetalliance Racing team, winning the first race of the season at Silverstone and again at Oschersleben. In 2010, he contested the first half of the FIA GT3 European Championship season, driving a Team S-Berg BMW Alpina B6 GT3 alongside Martin Matzke, the pair claiming a fourth place finish in the second race at Brno. Later that year he made his FIA GT1 World Championship debut at the Algarve round, driving a Maserati MC12 for the Hegersport team alongside Alessandro Pier Guidi. In 2011, Mayr-Melnhof took part in the full FIA GT3 European Championship in a Reiter Engineering Lamborghini Gallardo as teammate to Albert von Thurn und Taxis. The pair finished eighth in the standings, with race wins at Navarra and Paul Ricard. He also did three rounds of the Blancpain Endurance Series.

Mayr-Melnhof is racing a BMW Z4 GT3 in the GT1 World Championship in 2012 for BMW Team Vita4One, with fellow Austrian Mathias Lauda as his teammate.

== Racing record ==
=== FIA GT competition results ===
==== GT1 World Championship results ====
Year	Team	Car	1	2	3	4	5	6	7	8	9	10	11	12	13	14	15	16	17	18	Pos	Points
2012	BMW Team Vita4One	BMW	NOG; QR; 12	NOG; CR; 11	ZOL; QR; 5	ZOL; CR; 14	NAV; QR; 7	NAV; QR; 6	SVK; QR; 10	SVK; CR; 7	ALG; QR; 5	ALG; CR; 8	SVK; QR; 2	SVK; CR; 3	MOS; QR; 7	MOS; CR; 10	NUR; QR; 9	NUR; CR; 5	BUD; QR; 8	BUD; CR; Ret	12th	56

=== Complete FIA GT Series results ===
Year	Team	Car	Class	1	2	3	4	5	6	7	8	9	10	11	12	Pos.	Points
2013	Belgian Audi Club Team WRT	Audi R8 LMS ultra	Pro	NOG; QR; 2	NOG; CR; 6	ZOL; QR; 3	ZOL; CR; 5	ZAN; QR; 3	ZAN; CR; Ret	SVK; QR; 5	SVK; CR; 2	NAV; QR; 18	NAV; CR; 5	BAK; QR; 1	BAK; CR; 15	3rd	92

=== Complete Blancpain Sprint Series results ===
Year	Team	Car	Class	1	2	3	4	5	6	7	8	9	10	11	12	13	14	Pos.	Points
2014	Phoenix Racing	Audi R8 LMS ultra	Pro	NOG; QR; 2	NOG; CR; Ret	BRH; QR; 5	BRH; CR; Ret	ZAN; QR; Ret	ZAN; CR; 11	SVK; QR; 15	SVK; CR; Ret	ALG; QR; Ret	ALG; CR; 6	ZOL; QR; 16	ZOL; CR; 18	BAK; QR; 6	BAK; CR; 3	11th	32
2015	Phoenix Racing	Audi R8 LMS ultra	Pro	NOG; QR; Ret	NOG; CR; 8	BRH; QR; 6	BRH; CR; 8	ZOL; QR; 4	ZOL; CR; 5	MOS; QR; WD	MOS; CR; WD	ALG; QR; 3	ALG; CR; 2	MIS; QR; 12	MIS; CR; 12	ZAN; QR; 3	ZAN; CR; Ret	9th	48
2016	Phoenix Racing	Audi R8 LMS	Pro	MIS; QR; 15	MIS; CR; 27	BRH; QR; 13	BRH; CR; 11	NÜR; QR; 21	NÜR; CR; 22	HUN; QR; WD	HUN; CR; WD	CAT; QR; Ret	CAT; CR; 16					NC	0
