= 2012 FIA GT1 Algarve round =

FIA GT1 motor race

Layout of the Algarve International Circuit

The 2012 FIA GT1 Algarve round was an auto racing event held on 7–8 July 2012 at the Autódromo Internacional do Algarve in Portimão, Portugal. It was the fifth round of the 2012 FIA GT1 World Championship season for grand tourer racing cars complying with GT1 and GT3 regulations. The event consisted of two races, the Qualifying Race and the Championship Race, each of which lasted one hour. The Qualifying Race took place on 7 June and was won by the All-Inkl.com Münnich Motorsport pairing of Markus Winkelhock and Marc Basseng. The Championship race was held the following day and saw Thomas Jäger and Nicky Pastorelli take victory, also driving for All-Inkl.com Münnich Motorsport.

== Qualifying ==
=== Qualifying result ===
For qualifying, Driver 1 participates in the first and third sessions while Driver 2 participates in only the second session. The fastest lap for each session is indicated with bold.

Pos	No.	Driver 1	Team	Session 1	Session 2	Session 3	Grid
Pos	No.	Driver 2	Team	Session 1	Session 2	Session 3	Grid
1	3	(Finland) Toni Vilander	(Italy) AF Corse	1:44.945	1:45.560	1:44.730	1
1	3	(Czech Republic) Filip Salaquarda	(Italy) AF Corse	1:44.945	1:45.560	1:44.730	1
2	4	(Belgium) Enzo Ide	(Italy) AF Corse	1:45.858	1:44.832	1:45.630	2
2	4	(Italy) Francesco Castellacci	(Italy) AF Corse	1:45.858	1:44.832	1:45.630	2
3	38	(Germany) Marc Basseng	(Germany) All-Inkl.com Münnich Motorsport	1:45.514	1:44.793	1:45.693	3
3	38	(Germany) Markus Winkelhock	(Germany) All-Inkl.com Münnich Motorsport	1:45.514	1:44.793	1:45.693	3
4	37	(Netherlands) Nicky Pastorelli	(Germany) All-Inkl.com Münnich Motorsport	1:47.305	1:45.484	1:45.709	4
4	37	(Germany) Thomas Jäger	(Germany) All-Inkl.com Münnich Motorsport	1:47.305	1:45.484	1:45.709	4
5	25	(Hong Kong) Darryl O'Young	(Germany) Reiter Engineering	1:45.640	1:44.987	1:45.916	5
5	25	(Netherlands) Peter Kox	(Germany) Reiter Engineering	1:45.640	1:44.987	1:45.916	5
6	10	(Italy) Matteo Cressoni	(Spain) Sunred	1:46.124	1:45.478	1:45.927	6
6	10	(Serbia) Miloš Pavlović	(Spain) Sunred	1:46.124	1:45.478	1:45.927	6
7	33	(United Kingdom) Oliver Jarvis	(Belgium) Belgian Audi Club Team WRT	1:46.319	1:45.551	1:46.326	7
7	33	(Germany) Frank Stippler	(Belgium) Belgian Audi Club Team WRT	1:46.319	1:45.551	1:46.326	7
8	2	(France) Grégoire Demoustier	(France) Hexis Racing	1:51.567	1:45.254	1:46.455	8
8	2	(Portugal) Álvaro Parente	(France) Hexis Racing	1:51.567	1:45.254	1:46.455	8
9	24	(Germany) Albert von Thurn und Taxis	(Germany) Reiter Engineering	1:46.395	1:45.703		9
9	24	(Slovakia) Štefan Rosina	(Germany) Reiter Engineering	1:46.395	1:45.703		9
10	32	(Monaco) Stéphane Ortelli	(Belgium) Belgian Audi Club Team WRT	1:45.735	1:45.777		10
10	32	(Belgium) Laurens Vanthoor	(Belgium) Belgian Audi Club Team WRT	1:45.735	1:45.777		10
11	18	(Germany) Michael Bartels	(Germany) BMW Team Vita4One	1:45.381	1:45.897		11
11	18	(Netherlands) Yelmer Buurman	(Germany) BMW Team Vita4One	1:45.381	1:45.897		11
12	1	(France) Frédéric Makowiecki	(France) Hexis Racing	1:46.039	1:45.906		12
12	1	(Netherlands) Stef Dusseldorp	(France) Hexis Racing	1:46.039	1:45.906		12
13	17	(Austria) Nikolaus Mayr-Melnhof	(Germany) BMW Team Vita4One	1:45.796	1:46.069		13
13	17	(Austria) Mathias Lauda	(Germany) BMW Team Vita4One	1:45.796	1:46.069		13
14	9	(Austria) Andreas Zuber	Exim Bank Team China	1:45.923	1:46.566		14
14	9	(Germany) Thomas Jäger	Exim Bank Team China	1:45.923	1:46.566		14
15	8	(France) Benjamin Lariche	Exim Bank Team China	No Time			15
15	8	(France) Dino Lunardi	Exim Bank Team China	No Time			15

== Races ==
=== Qualifying Race ===
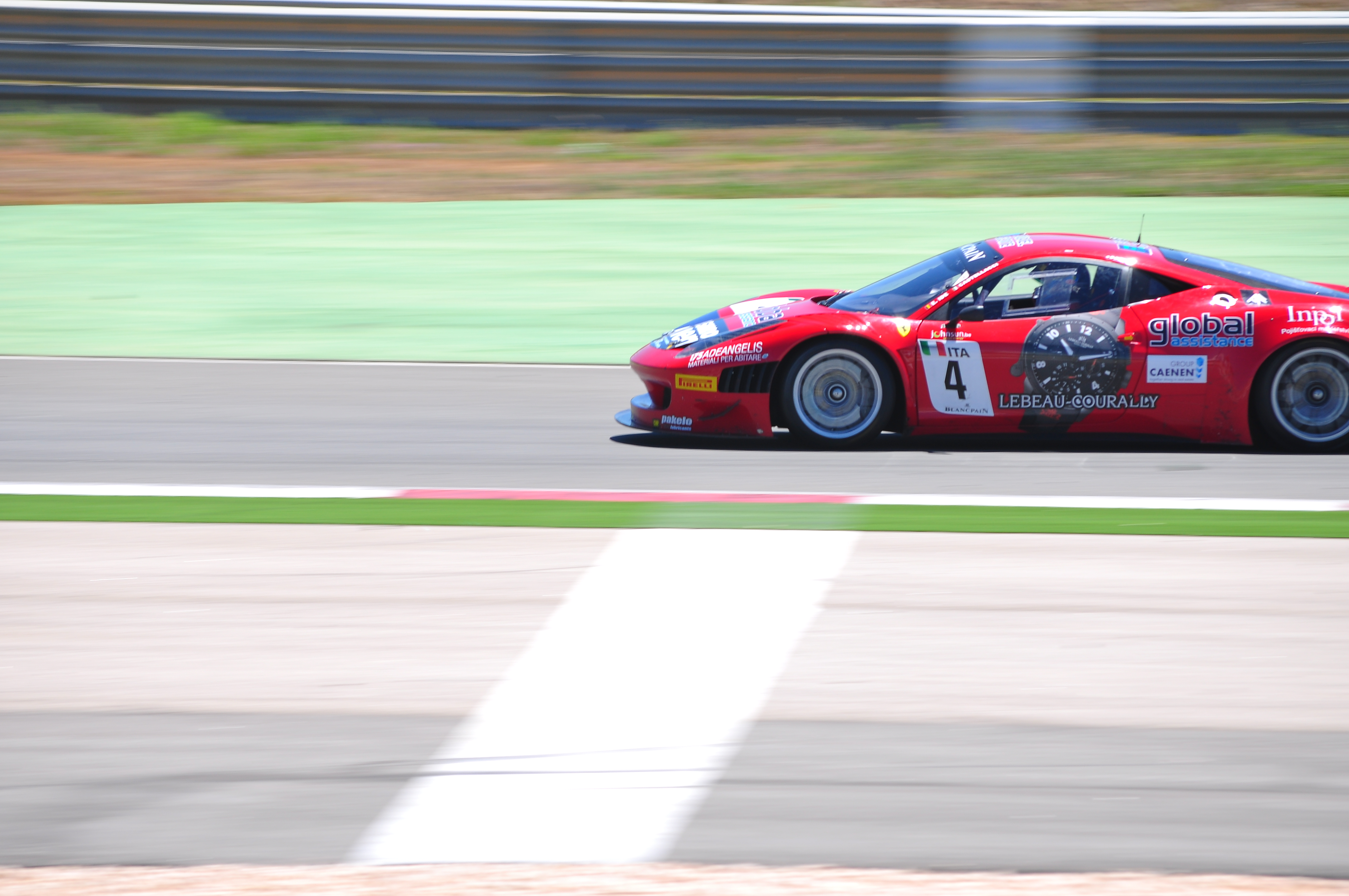
The AF Corse no. 4 Ferrari of Francesco Castellacci and Enzo Ide started the Qualifying Race from second position

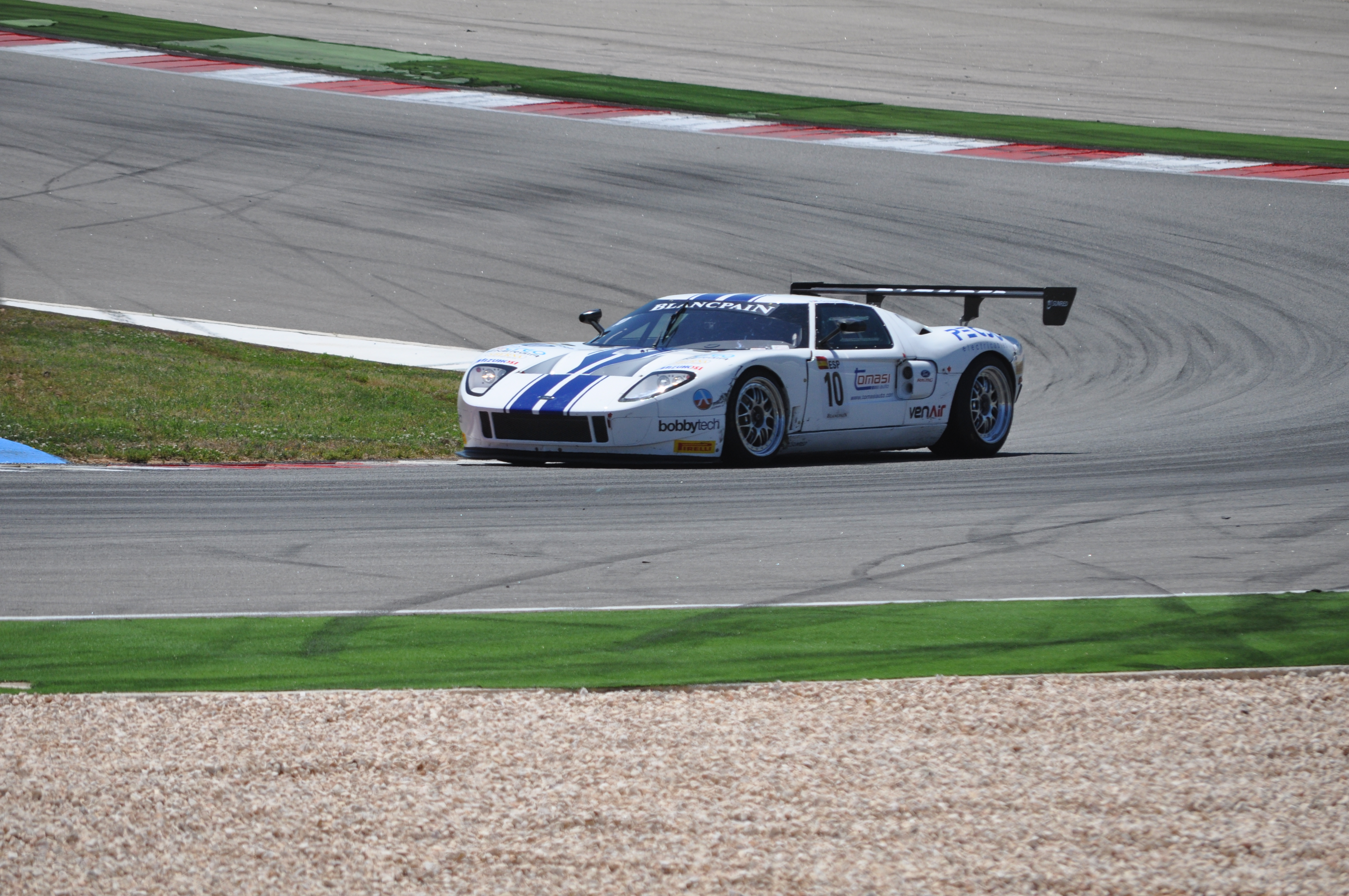
The Sunred no. 10 Ford of Miloš Pavlović and Matteo Cressoni finished the Qualifying Race in seventh place

As per the sporting regulations, the named second driver of each car started the qualifying race. Starting from pole position, Filip Salaquarda in the no. 3 AF Corse Ferrari maintained first position in the opening laps ahead of Francesco Castellacci in the no. 4 AF Corsa Ferrari; Marcus Winkelhock (no. 38) and Thomas Jäger (no. 37) in the two All-Inkl.com Münnich Motorsport Mercedes cars similarly retained their grid positions of third and fourth respectively. By the beginning of lap five both Winkelhock and Jäger had overtaken Castellacci, whose slow lap times soon allowed Peter Kox in the no. 25 Lamborghini, Miloš Pavlović in the no. 10 Ford, and Alvaro Parente in the no. 2 McLaren to close in. An attempt by Parente to overtake Kox however ended in a collision between the two, forcing Kox to retire from the race with broken steering. Kox's damaged Lamborghini was stranded at the side of the track, necessitating the safety car to slow the race down and allow the marshalls to safely clear the track.

The safety car was withdrawn and the racing re-commenced 25 minutes after the beginning of the race, which was the earliest opportunity the mandatory pit stop and driver change specified in the championship's sporting regulations could be taken. Both Salaquarda in the lead and Castellacci in fourth place opted to pit right away, handing over their Ferraris to Toni Vilander and Enzo Ide respectively. Ignition problems on both cars however saw Vilander and Ide drop down the order after delays of up to half a minute, with Vilander rejoining the race outside the top ten runners. Winkelhock and Jäger chose to pit over the next two laps, but a slow stop for the no. 37 Mercedes saw Jäger's co-driver Nicky Pastorelli rejoin the race having lost several positions.

Following the conclusion of the pitstops, Winklehock's teammate Marc Basseng assumed the race lead with a four-second advantage over the no. 33 Audi of Frank Stippler. Having benefited from a quick pitstop and the earlier safety car closing up the field, the no. 17 BMW of Mathias Lauda had climbed to third ahead of the no. 2 McLaren, now driven by Grégoire Demoustier. The pair however were soon passed by the second BMW of Yelmer Buurman (no. 18), who in the hands of Michael Bartels had suffered a poor start to the race and ran as low as thirteenth in the early laps. Buurman later overtook Stippler for second position after a three-lap battle, with Buurman's speed advantage in the corners nullified by Stippler's greater performance on the straights. The no. 18 BMW eventually passed at the circuit's first corner with 10 minutes of the race to go.

After one hour of racing Basseng took the checkered flag by a margin of eight seconds over Buurman, claiming both his and his team's first victory of the season. Stippler finished in third position a further eight seconds behind, crossing the line half a second ahead of Frédéric Makowiecki in the no. 1 McLaren, whose late-race pace allowed him to displace Lauda's no. 17 BMW for fourth in the closing stages. In contrast, Demoustier's no. 2 McLaren fell back in the final few laps, losing positions to Pastorelli's no. 37 Mercedes and Matteo Cressoni's no. 10 Ford to end the race in eighth position. Vilander in the polesitting no. 3 Ferrari finished the race in twelfth position.

Pos	No.	Team	Drivers	Manufacturer	Laps	Time/Retired
1	38	(Germany) All-Inkl.com Münnich Motorsport	(Germany) Marc Basseng (Germany) Markus Winkelhock	Mercedes-Benz	32	1:00:08.853
2	18	(Germany) BMW Team Vita4One	(Germany) Michael Bartels (Netherlands) Yelmer Buurman	BMW	32	+8.460
3	33	(Belgium) Belgian Audi Club Team WRT	(United Kingdom) Oliver Jarvis (Germany) Frank Stippler	Audi	32	+16.763
4	1	(France) Hexis Racing	(France) Frédéric Makowiecki (Netherlands) Stef Dusseldorp	McLaren	32	+17.267
5	17	(Germany) BMW Team Vita4One	(Austria) Nikolaus Mayr-Melnhof (Austria) Mathias Lauda	BMW	32	+20.851
6	37	(Germany) All-Inkl.com Münnich Motorsport	(Netherlands) Nicky Pastorelli (Germany) Thomas Jäger	Mercedes-Benz	32	+25.431
7	10	(Spain) Sunred	(Italy) Matteo Cressoni (Serbia) Miloš Pavlović	Ford	32	+27.080
8	2	(France) Hexis Racing	(France) Grégoire Demoustier (Portugal) Álvaro Parente	McLaren	32	+30.707
9	9	Exim Bank Team China	(Austria) Andreas Zuber (France) Mike Parisy	Porsche	32	+33.854
10	32	(Belgium) Belgian Audi Club Team WRT	(Monaco) Stéphane Ortelli (Belgium) Laurens Vanthoor	Audi	32	+34.486
11	4	(Italy) AF Corse	(Belgium) Enzo Ide (Italy) Francesco Castellacci	Ferrari	32	+51.276
12	3	(Italy) AF Corse	(Finland) Toni Vilander (Czech Republic) Filip Salaquarda	Ferrari	32	+56.962
13	24	(Germany) Reiter Engineering	(Germany) Albert von Thurn und Taxis (Slovakia) Štefan Rosina	Lamborghini	31	+1 lap
14 Ret	25	(Germany) Reiter Engineering	(Hong Kong) Darryl O'Young (Netherlands) Peter Kox	Lamborghini	10	Steering

=== Championship Race ===
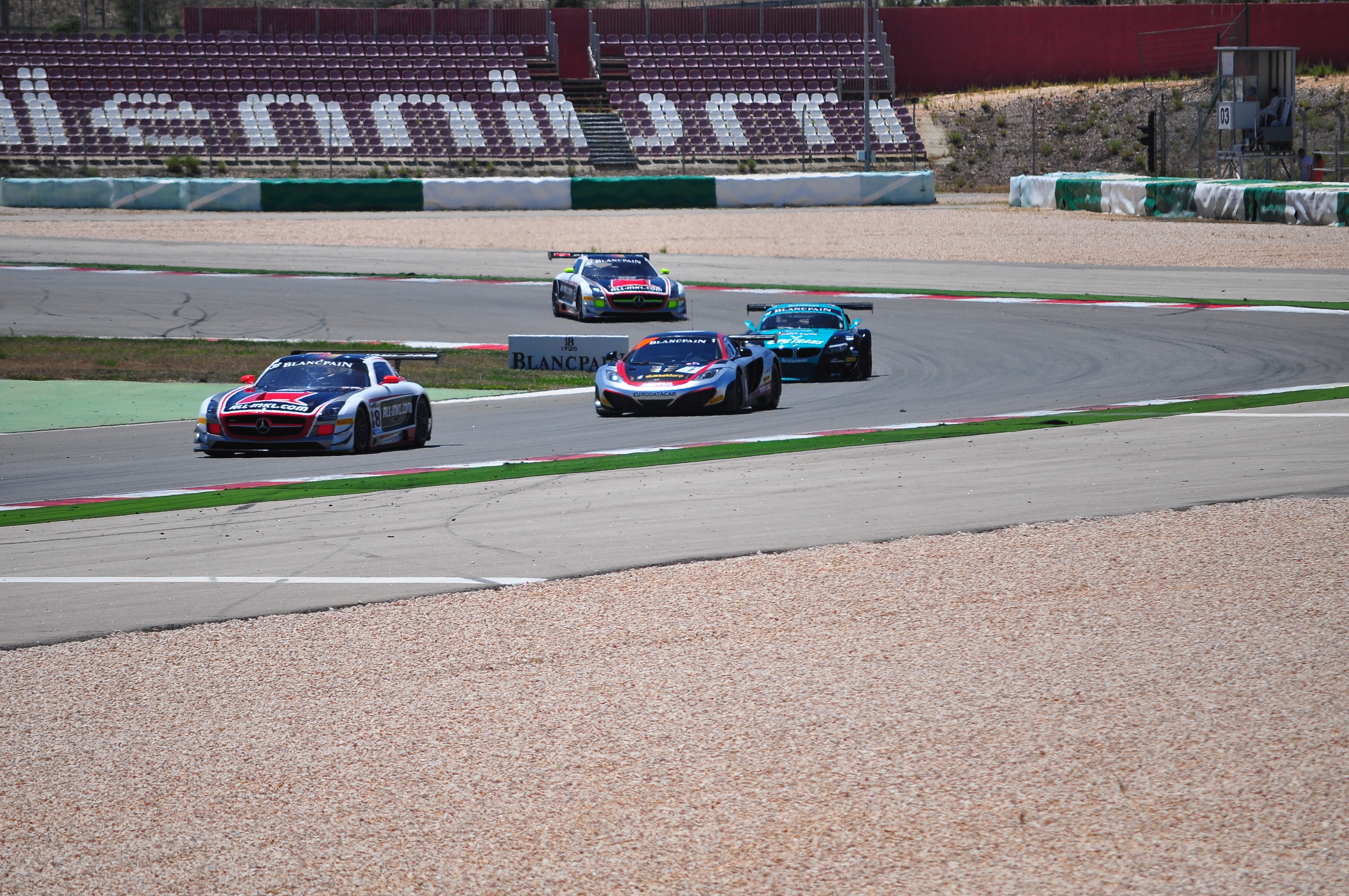
Marc Basseng (left) leads Frédéric Makowiecki, Yelmer Buurman, and Nicky Pastorelli in the opening half of the Championship race

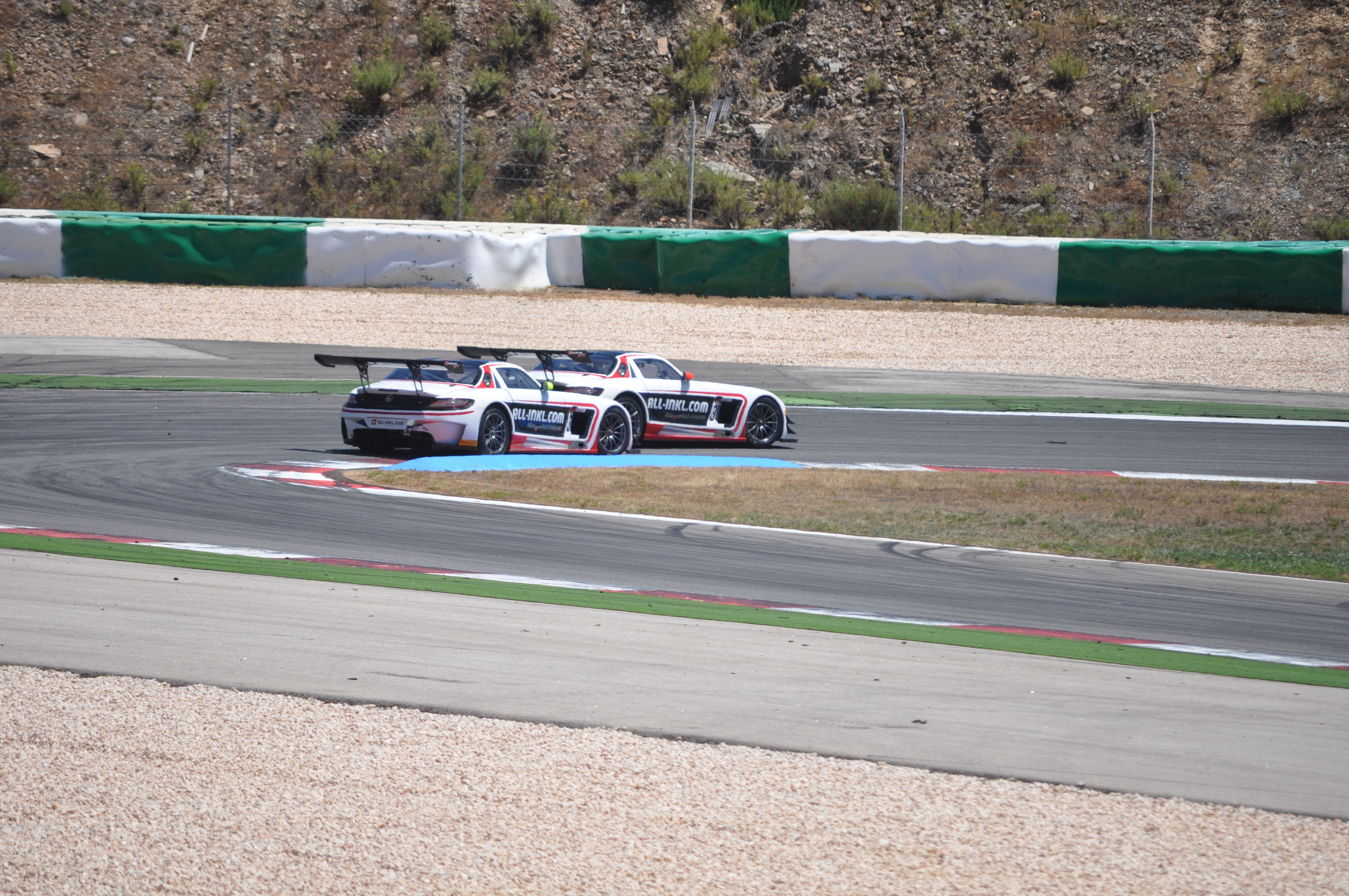
Jäger (left) and Winkelhock battle for the second place during the Championship Race. Jäger went on to win the race ahead of Winkelhock

As per the sporting regulations, the named first driver of each car started the championship race, the grid of which was determined by the result of the qualifying race. Marc Basseng therefore started the race from pole position in the no. 38 Mercedes. At the beginning of the race Basseng held onto to the lead ahead of Frédéric Makowiecki, who in the no. 4 McLaren rose from his fourth-placed grid position to take second place. Both the no. 33 Audi of Frank Stippler and the no. 3 Ferrari of Toni Vilander were spun around at the first corner after contact with Grégoire Demoustier's no. 2 McLaren, Stippler suffering a puncture and Vilander retiring from damage to his car's radiator. Behind Basseng and Makowiecki were Yelmer Buurman's BMW (no. 18) and Nicky Pastorelli's Mercedes (no. 37), the top four racing in close formation for the opening half of the race. Despite several overtaking attempts, the order of the frontrunners remained unchanged until the pit stop window opened.

Pastorelli in fourth position was the first of the leading quartet to pit, with Basseng and Buurman following one lap later and Makowiecki the lap afterwards. A quick stop by the no. 37 Mercedes pit crew allowed Pastorelli's co-driver Thomas Jäger to leapfrog the no. 18 BMW, now driven by Michael Bartels, into third position behind Basseng's no. 38 co-driver Marcus Winkelhock. As the last of the frontrunners to pit, Makowiecki benefited from both a clear track to increase his pace and the faster Jäger being stuck behind Winkelhock, giving his co-driver Stef Dusseldorp a narrow lead as he exited the pit lane. Further back, the battle for sixth place between Laurens Vanthoor in the no. 32 Audi and Nikolaus Mayr-Melnhof in the no. 17 BMW ended in a collision and a spin for Vanthoor. The race stewards deemed Mayr-Melnhof at fault for the incident and subsequently awarded him a drive-through penalty. (Note: A drive-through penalty is where the offending driver "must enter the pit lane and rejoin the race without stopping.")

Having spent two laps behind Winkelhock, Jäger overtook both the no. 38 Mercedes and first-placed Dusseldorp in quick succession to take the lead of the race. Winkelhock passed the no. 1 McLaren one lap later, but the pace of Jäger and the gap between the Mercedes cars was too great for him to overcome. Jäger subsequently went on to claim victory ahead of Winkelhock at the one-hour mark. Third-placed Dusseldorp resisted the no. 18 BMW of Bartels to finish the race on the final step of the podium, with Peter Kox in the no. 25 Lamborghini crossing the line fourth after Bartels slowed from missing a gear change on the final lap. Andreas Zuber in the no. 9 Porsche was running sixth on the last lap before suffering mechanical problems, allowing Vanthoor in the no. 32 Audi to regain the place he had lost following his earlier contact with Mayr-Melnhof. Zuber ended the race in eighth position behind Francesco Castellacci's no. 4 Ferrari.

=== Results ===
Pos	No.	Team	Drivers	Manufacturer	Laps	Time/Retired	Points
1	37	(Germany) All-Inkl.com Münnich Motorsport	(Netherlands) Nicky Pastorelli (Germany) Thomas Jäger	Mercedes-Benz	33	1:00:25.723	25
2	38	(Germany) All-Inkl.com Münnich Motorsport	(Germany) Marc Basseng (Germany) Markus Winkelhock	Mercedes-Benz	33	+1.537	18
3	1	(France) Hexis Racing	(France) Frédéric Makowiecki (Netherlands) Stef Dusseldorp	McLaren	33	+5.163	15
4	25	(Germany) Reiter Engineering	(Hong Kong) Darryl O'Young (Netherlands) Peter Kox	Lamborghini	33	+6.511	12
5	18	(Germany) BMW Team Vita4One	(Germany) Michael Bartels (Netherlands) Yelmer Buurman	BMW	33	+6.878	10
6	32	(Belgium) Belgian Audi Club Team WRT	(Monaco) Stéphane Ortelli (Belgium) Laurens Vanthoor	Audi	33	+31.875	8
7	4	(Italy) AF Corse	(Belgium) Enzo Ide (Italy) Francesco Castellacci	Ferrari	33	+34.723	6
8	17	(Germany) BMW Team Vita4One	(Austria) Nikolaus Mayr-Melnhof (Austria) Mathias Lauda	BMW	33	+51.195	4
9	10	(Spain) Sunred	(Italy) Matteo Cressoni (Serbia) Miloš Pavlović	Ford	33	+1:45.458	2
10	9	Exim Bank Team China	(Austria) Andreas Zuber (France) Mike Parisy	Porsche	32	+1 lap	1
11 Ret	2	(France) Hexis Racing	(France) Grégoire Demoustier (Portugal) Álvaro Parente	McLaren	26	Engine	
12 Ret	24	(Germany) Reiter Engineering	(Germany) Albert von Thurn und Taxis (Slovakia) Štefan Rosina	Lamborghini	26	Retired	
13 Ret	33	(Belgium) Belgian Audi Club Team WRT	(United Kingdom) Oliver Jarvis (Germany) Frank Stippler	Audi	7	Suspension	
14 Ret	3	(Italy) AF Corse	(Italy) Toni Vilander (Czech Republic) Filip Salaquarda	Ferrari	1	Radiator	

== Notes ==
FIA GT1 World Championship
Previous race: Slovakia 1	2012 season	Next race: Slovakia 2
