= GT Tour =

Auto racing championship in France

The GT Tour is a format which contains different motorsports championships in France. They are 8 different series at GT Tour events:

- FFSA GT Championship
- French F4 Championship
- Porsche Carrera Cup France
- Peugeot RCZ Racing Cup
- SEAT Leon Supercopa France
- Renault Clio Cup France
- Mitjet Series 1300 Lights
- Mitjet Series 2L
