= Hexis Racing =

French auto racing team

(France) Hexis Racing
- Founded: 2001
- Folded: 2013
- Team principal(s): Clément Mateu; Philippe Dumas
- Former series: French Formula Renault Championship; ADAC GT Masters; FFSA GT Championship; FIA GT Championship; FIA GT3 European Championship; FIA GT1 World Championship
- Teams' Championships: 2 (2009 FIA GT3, 2011 FIA GT1)

Hexis Racing is an auto racing team based in Lédenon, France. Hexis Racing was founded by Michel Mateu, CEO of Hexis S.A. in 2001, initially for participation in the French Formula Renault Championship. Hexis later moved into grand tourer racing in 2005, participating in the FFSA GT Championship before joining the FIA GT3 European Championship in 2007. Hexis Racing has further expanded, now supporting Aston Martin Racing in the 2010 FIA GT1 World Championship season. The team is currently managed by Clément Mateu and Philippe Dumas.

== History ==
Hexis Racing began as an expansion of Michel Mateu's interests in auto racing, with Mateu using his Hexis brand to help support and finance the team's involvement in the French Formula Renault Championship. Mateu gave the leadership concerns of the team to Philippe Dumas while Clément Mateu held communication and development management. Hexis Racing was able to climb the ranks in Formula Renault and recorded their first race wins in 2003. By the end of 2005 the team had achieved their best placing, third, in the Teams Championship.

In the same year, Hexis Racing also expanded their racing effort to include the FFSA GT Championship, choosing to enter a Porsche 996 Cup for Manuel and Julien Rodrigues, later earning second in the category in 2006 after five race victories. Hexis Racing abandoned their involvement in Formula Renault and concentrated their efforts solely on grand tourer racing in 2007, moving to a trio of Aston Martin DBRS9s for not only FFSA GT, but also the FIA GT3 European Championship. Hexis finished third in the FFSA GT Teams Championship while also earning a podium finish in their debut season in FIA GT3.

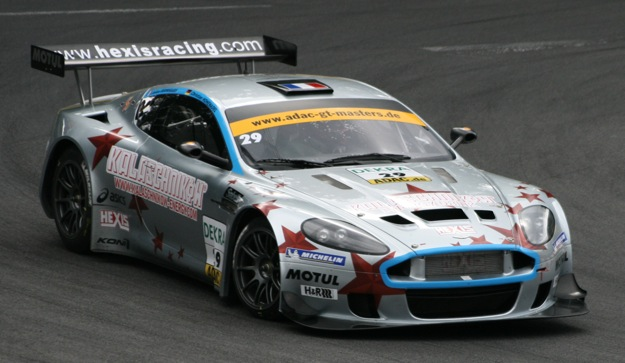
A Hexis Racing Aston Martin DBRS9 participating in an ADAC GT Masters event at the Norisring in 2008

For 2008 Hexis remained in the FIA GT3 series but moved their DBRS9s from FFSA GT to the German ADAC GT Masters series. Their GT Masters effort netted them third in the series' championship while they were runners-up in FIA GT after earning their first series win. Further changes were made for the 2009 season, although the team retained their involvement in FIA GT3. Instead of the GT Masters series, Hexis Racing campaigned a partial season of the FIA GT Championship with a GT2 category Aston Martin V8 Vantage as part of an effort supported by Aston Martin Racing. Although the GT2 effort only came to fruition for two events, the team's GT3 effort saw three race wins and their earning of the Teams Championship title. The team's pairing of Julien Rodrigues and Thomas Accary also earned second in the FIA GT3 Drivers Championship.

In 2011, Hexis Racing experienced a hectic season running Aston Martin DBR9s in the FIA GT1 World Championship. The team took a handful of early victories but then struggled to make it to the podium. However, consistent points finishes for both cars and a final podium at the San Luis round allowed Hexis Racing to barely swing past JRM Racing to take the team's championship. The drivers of the #3 car also came in 3rd in the driver's championship.

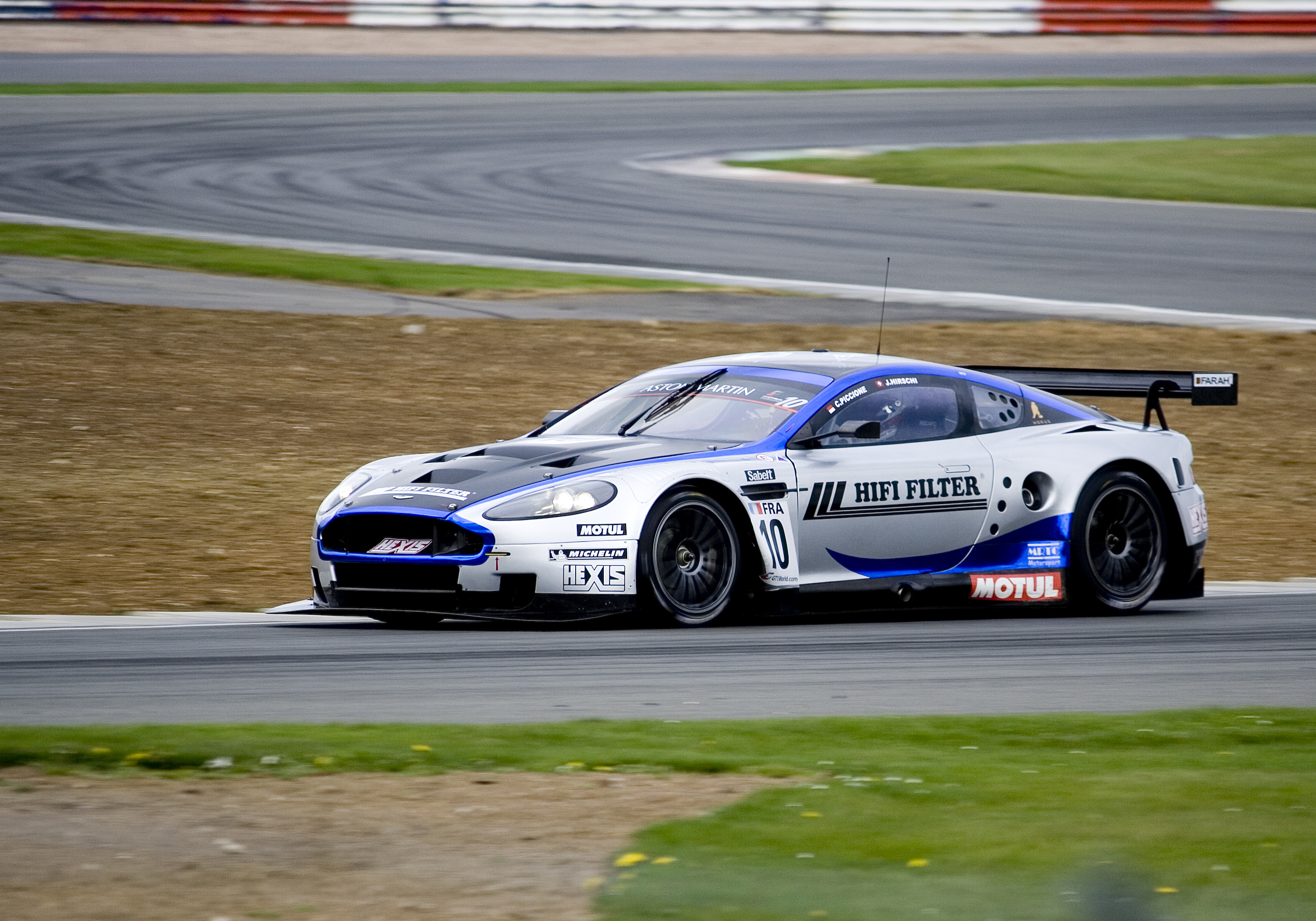
One of Hexis AMR's entries in the 2010 FIA GT1 World Championship

Following the 2011 GT1 season where Hexis took the team's Championship at the last round, Hexis selected Mclaren MP4-12C GT3s as their car of choice to run in the 2012 GT1 season (due to the mandatory switch to GT3 cars). Stef Dusseldorp returns with Hexis while Frédéric Makowiecki arrives from Marc VDS Racing; there are also GT1 newcomers Grégoire Demoustier and Mclaren factory driver Álvaro Parente.

In 2013 Hexis Racing took part in the Blancpain Endurance Series, again with a Mclaren MP4-12C GT3. At the end of the season the team announced its plans to retire from motor racing, after the team made it clear earlier in the year it would close its doors if no additional financial backing was secured, after title sponsor Hexis decided to focus its budgets on different matters.
