= Team LMP Motorsport =

(France) Team LMP Motorpsort
- Founded: 2010
- Team principal(s): Guillaume Lecluse; Yves Migeon
- Current series: FIA GT1 World Championship; FIA GT3 European Championship
- Former series: FFSA GT Championship

Team LMP Motorsport is a French auto racing team founded in 2010 by Guillaume Lecluse and Yves Migeon. Backed by Lompech Motor Sport, LMP Motorsport has campaigned Aston Martins since its foundation, expanded from initial involvement in the French FFSA GT Championship (now GT Tour) in 2010 to the international FIA GT3 European Championship in 2011 and the FIA GT1 World Championship series in 2012. LMP Motorsport operates in the GT1 World Championship with Russian backing under the title of Valmon Racing Team Russia.

== History ==
LMP Motorsport debuted during the 2010 FFSA GT season with two Aston Martin DBRS9s with Anthony Beltoise, Grégory Guilvert, Grégoire Demoustier, and Nicolas Tardif sharing driving duties. The team scored a best finish of fifth at Dijon-Prenois. In 2011, LMP added the FIA GT3 series to their schedule, and earned three podiums with drivers Maxime Martin and Gaël Lesoudier and finishing the season seventh in the Drivers' Championship. In GT Tour the team earned a single podium from drivers Frédéric Gabilllon and Paul Lamic.

For 2012 LMP Motorsport became the sole representative of Aston Martin in the FIA GT1 World Championship, with backing from Russian sponsor Valmon. Russian drivers Sergey Afanasyev and Alexey Vasilyev will share the team's two DBRS9s with Austrian Andreas Zuber and Belgian Maxime Martin.

LMP Motorsport will also compete in the European GT3 Championship under the Valmon Racing banner, entering a single Aston Martin DBRS9 for two-time 24 Hours of Le Mans class winner Tom Kimber-Smith and Russian driver Natalia Freidina, the only female driver on the GT3 grid.
