= 2012 FIA GT1 Zolder round =

Layout of the Circuit Zolder

The 2012 FIA GT1 Zolder round is an auto racing event held at the Circuit Zolder, Heusden-Zolder, Belgium on 20–22 April 2012, and is the second round of the 2012 FIA GT1 World Championship season. It is the second time the FIA GT1 World Championship has visited Zolder, with defending race winners Markus Winkelhock and Marc Basseng returning for 2012 with All-Inkl.com Münnich Motorsport. The event is supported by the FIA GT3 European Championship, the 2012 Supercar Challenge, and the Belgian Historic Cup.

== Qualifying ==
=== Qualifying result ===
For qualifying, Driver 1 participates in the first and third sessions while Driver 2 participates in only the second session. The fastest lap for each session is indicated with bold.

Pos	No.	Driver 1	Team	Session 1	Session 2	Session 3	Grid
Pos	No.	Driver 2	Team	Session 1	Session 2	Session 3	Grid
1	9	(New Zealand) Matt Halliday	Exim Bank Team China	1:42.283	1:41.238	1:33.568	4^{1}
1	9	(France) Mike Parisy	Exim Bank Team China	1:42.283	1:41.238	1:33.568	4^{1}
2	33	(Germany) Frank Stippler	(Belgium) Belgian Audi Club Team WRT	1:42.590	1:41.125	1:33.704	1
2	33	(United Kingdom) Oliver Jarvis	(Belgium) Belgian Audi Club Team WRT	1:42.590	1:41.125	1:33.704	1
3	25	(Hong Kong) Darryl O'Young	(Germany) Reiter Engineering	1:43.250	1:41.400	1:33.936	2
3	25	(Netherlands) Peter Kox	(Germany) Reiter Engineering	1:43.250	1:41.400	1:33.936	2
4	37	(Germany) Thomas Jäger	(Germany) All-Inkl.com Münnich Motorsport	1:41.532	1:40.534	1:34.004	3
4	37	(Netherlands) Nicky Pastorelli	(Germany) All-Inkl.com Münnich Motorsport	1:41.532	1:40.534	1:34.004	3
5	32	(Belgium) Laurens Vanthoor	(Belgium) Belgian Audi Club Team WRT	1:42.602	1:40.880	1:34.034	5
5	32	(Monaco) Stéphane Ortelli	(Belgium) Belgian Audi Club Team WRT	1:42.602	1:40.880	1:34.034	5
6	18	(Germany) Michael Bartels	(Germany) Vita4One Racing Team	1:43.488	1:39.978	1:34.145	6
6	18	(Netherlands) Yelmer Buurman	(Germany) Vita4One Racing Team	1:43.488	1:39.978	1:34.145	6
7	38	(Germany) Markus Winkelhock	(Germany) All-Inkl.com Münnich Motorsport	1:41.886	1:40.367	1:34.384	7
7	38	(Germany) Marc Basseng	(Germany) All-Inkl.com Münnich Motorsport	1:41.886	1:40.367	1:34.384	7
8	24	(Germany) Albert von Thurn und Taxis	(Germany) Reiter Engineering	1:42.190	1:40.248	1:39.132	8
8	24	(Czech Republic) Tomáš Enge	(Germany) Reiter Engineering	1:42.190	1:40.248	1:39.132	8
9	3	(Finland) Toni Vilander	(Italy) AF Corse	1:42.452	1:41.489		9
9	3	(Czech Republic) Filip Salaquarda	(Italy) AF Corse	1:42.452	1:41.489		9
10	1	(France) Frédéric Makowiecki	(France) Hexis Racing	1:43.104	1:41.623		10
10	1	(Netherlands) Stef Dusseldorp	(France) Hexis Racing	1:43.104	1:41.623		10
11	17	(Austria) Nikolaus Mayr-Melnhof	(Germany) Vita4One Racing Team	1:42.911	1:41.796		11
11	17	(Austria) Mathias Lauda	(Germany) Vita4One Racing Team	1:42.911	1:41.796		11
12	4	(Belgium) Enzo Ide	(Italy) AF Corse	1:42.071	1:42.017		12
12	4	(Italy) Francesco Castellacci	(Italy) AF Corse	1:42.071	1:42.017		12
13	7	(Belgium) Maxime Martin	Valmon Racing Team Russia	1:44.579	1:43.449		13
13	7	(Russia) Alexey Vasilyev	Valmon Racing Team Russia	1:44.579	1:43.449		13
14	8	(France) Benjamin Lariche	Exim Bank Team China	1:43.731	1:48.196		14
14	8	(China) Ren Wei	Exim Bank Team China	1:43.731	1:48.196		14
15	10	(Serbia) Miloš Pavlović	(Spain) Sunred	1:46.490			15
15	10	(Italy) Matteo Cressoni	(Spain) Sunred	1:46.490			15
16	2	(France) Grégoire Demoustier	(France) Hexis Racing	1:53.099			16
16	2	(Portugal) Álvaro Parente	(France) Hexis Racing	1:53.099			16
17	6	(Austria) Andreas Zuber	Valmon Racing Team Russia	No Time			17
17	6	(Russia) Sergey Afanasyev	Valmon Racing Team Russia	No Time			17

Notes:

- ^1 — The No. 9 Team China Porsche was demoted three grid spots for a crossing the pit exit blend line during Qualifying 3.

== Races ==
=== Qualifying Race ===
Pos	No.	Team	Drivers	Manufacturer	Laps	Time/Retired
1	18	(Germany) Vita4One Racing Team	(Germany) Michael Bartels (Netherlands) Yelmer Buurman	BMW	36	
2	37	(Germany) All-Inkl.com Münnich Motorsport	(Netherlands) Nicky Pastorelli (Germany) Thomas Jäger	Mercedes-Benz	36	-0.567
3	9	Exim Bank Team China	(France) Mike Parisy (New Zealand) Matt Halliday	Porsche	36	-20.578
4	1	(France) Hexis Racing	(France) Frédéric Makowiecki (Netherlands) Stef Dusseldorp	McLaren	36	-21.119
5	17	(Germany) Vita4One Racing Team	(Austria) Mathias Lauda (Austria) Nikolaus Mayr-Melnhof	BMW	36	-21.462
6	38	(Germany) All-Inkl.com Münnich Motorsport	(Germany) Marc Basseng (Germany) Markus Winkelhock	Mercedes-Benz	36	-25.785
7	4	(Italy) AF Corse	(Italy) Francesco Castellacci (Belgium) Enzo Ide	Ferrari	36	-41.336
8	25	(Germany) Reiter Engineering	(Netherlands) Peter Kox (Hong Kong) Darryl O'Young	Lamborghini	36	-49.829
9	7	Valmon Racing Team Russia	(Russia) Alexey Vasilyev (Belgium) Maxime Martin	Aston Martin	36	-1:03.752
10	2	(France) Hexis Racing	(Portugal) Álvaro Parente (France) Grégoire Demoustier	McLaren	36	-1:09.961
11	33	(Belgium) Belgian Audi Club Team WRT	(Germany) Frank Stippler (United Kingdom) Oliver Jarvis	Audi	36	-1:10.255
12	32	(Belgium) Belgian Audi Club Team WRT	(Belgium) Laurens Vanthoor (Monaco) Stéphane Ortelli	Audi	36	-1:39.328
13	3	(Italy) AF Corse	(Czech Republic) Filip Salaquarda (Finland) Toni Vilander	Ferrari	35	-1 Lap
14 DNF	6	Valmon Racing Team Russia	(Russia) Sergey Afanasyev (Austria) Andreas Zuber	Aston Martin	18	Retired
15 DNF	24	(Germany) Reiter Engineering	(Germany) Albert von Thurn und Taxis (Czech Republic) Tomáš Enge	Lamborghini	9	Gearbox
16 DNF	8	Exim Bank Team China	(China) Ren Wei (France) Benjamin Lariche	Porsche	7	Damage
DNS	10	(Spain) Sunred	(Serbia) Miloš Pavlović (Italy) Matteo Cressoni	Ford	–	Did Not Start

=== Championship Race ===
Pos	No.	Team	Drivers	Manufacturer	Laps	Time/Retired
1	9	Exim Bank Team China	(France) Mike Parisy (New Zealand) Matt Halliday	Porsche	36	
2	18	(Germany) BMW Team Vita4One	(Germany) Michael Bartels (Netherlands) Yelmer Buurman	BMW	36	-1.030
3	3	(Italy) AF Corse	(Czech Republic) Filip Salaquarda (Finland) Toni Vilander	Ferrari	36	-17.256
4	37	(Germany) All-Inkl.com Münnich Motorsport	(Netherlands) Nicky Pastorelli (Germany) Thomas Jäger	Mercedes-Benz	36	-29.070
5	1	(France) Hexis Racing	(France) Frédéric Makowiecki (Netherlands) Stef Dusseldorp	McLaren	36	-29.580
6	32	(Belgium) Belgian Audi Club Team WRT	(Belgium) Laurens Vanthoor (Monaco) Stéphane Ortelli	Audi	36	-29.900
7	2	(France) Hexis Racing	(Portugal) Álvaro Parente (France) Grégoire Demoustier	McLaren	36	-32.167
8	24	(Germany) Reiter Engineering	(Germany) Albert von Thurn und Taxis (Czech Republic) Tomáš Enge	Lamborghini	36	-37.156
9	38	(Germany) All-Inkl.com Münnich Motorsport	(Germany) Marc Basseng (Germany) Markus Winkelhock	Mercedes-Benz	36	-38.456
10	33	(Belgium) Belgian Audi Club Team WRT	(Germany) Frank Stippler (United Kingdom) Oliver Jarvis	Audi	36	-38.885
11	4	(Italy) AF Corse	(Italy) Francesco Castellacci (Belgium) Enzo Ide	Ferrari	36	-47.053
12	7	Valmon Racing Team Russia	(Russia) Alexey Vasilyev (Belgium) Maxime Martin	Aston Martin	36	-1:25.273
13	25	(Germany) Reiter Engineering	(Netherlands) Peter Kox (Hong Kong) Darryl O'Young	Lamborghini	35	-1 Lap
14	17	(Germany) BMW Team Vita4One	(Austria) Mathias Lauda (Austria) Nikolaus Mayr-Melnhof	BMW	35	-1 Lap
15	6	Valmon Racing Team Russia	(Russia) Sergey Afanasyev (Austria) Andreas Zuber	Aston Martin	35	-1 Lap
16	10	(Spain) Sunred	(Serbia) Miloš Pavlović (Italy) Matteo Cressoni	Ford	34	-2 Laps
17	8	Exim Bank Team China	(China) Ren Wei (France) Benjamin Lariche	Porsche	32	-4 Laps

FIA GT1 World Championship
Previous race: Nogaro	2012 season	Next race: Navarra
