= Frank Stippler =

German racing driver (born 1975)

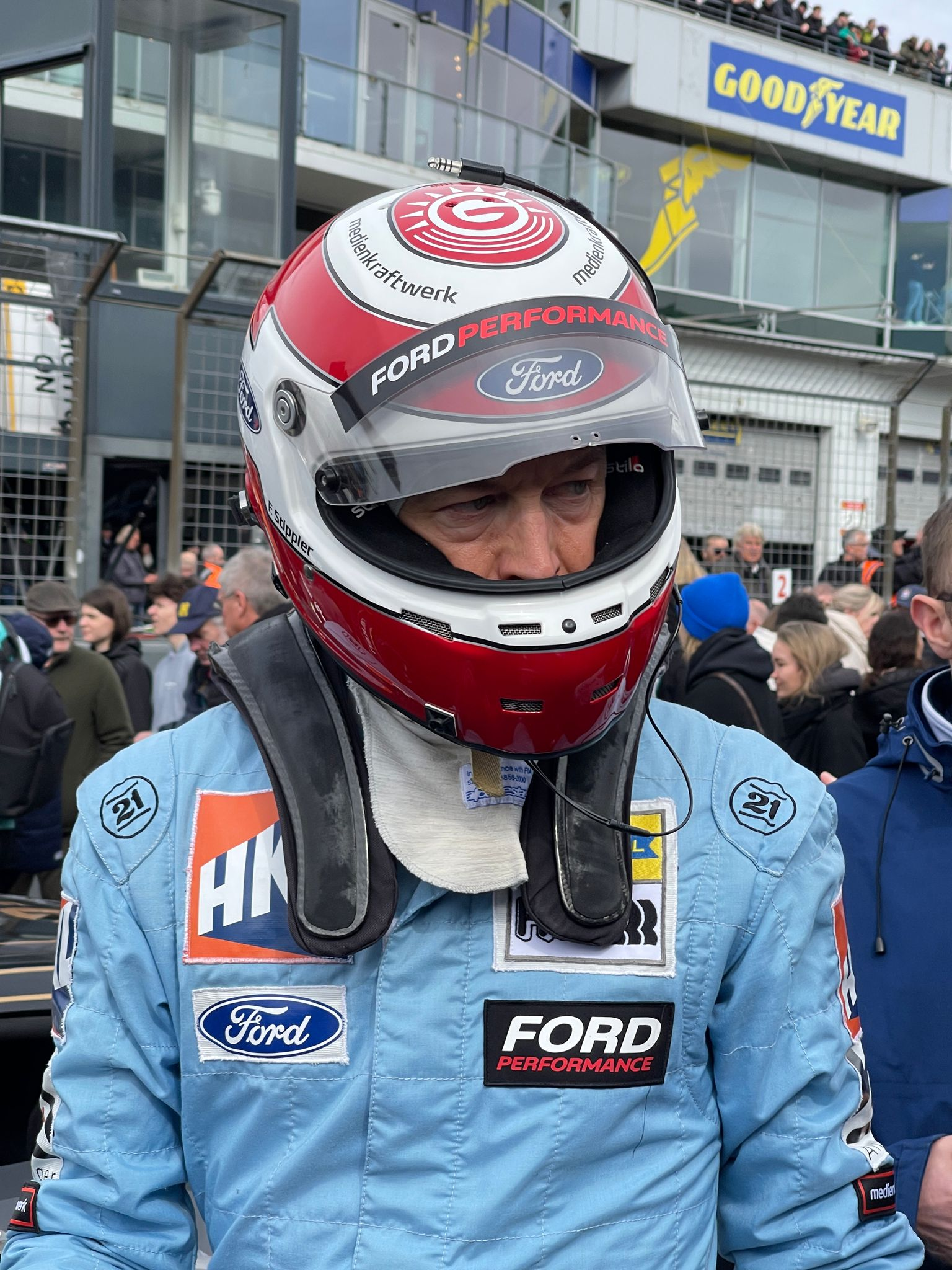
- Stippler at 2025 NLS1
- Nationality: (Germany) German
- Born: 9 April 1975 (age 51) Cologne, West Germany (now Germany)
- Categorisation: FIA Platinum (until 2011, 2014–); FIA Gold (2012–2013)

Championship titles
- 2003 2003: Porsche Supercup; Porsche Carrera Cup Germany

Frank Stippler (born 9 April 1975) is a German racing driver. He has competed in such series as Deutsche Tourenwagen Masters, Rolex Sports Car Series and the Swedish Touring Car Championship. He won both the Porsche Supercup and Porsche Carrera Cup Germany series in 2003. He is also very successful in historic racing.

Stippler started racing at the age of 18 in an Alfa Romeo Alfetta. He is a race and development driver for Audi Sport since the early days of his career.

Stippler is a long time driver in the Nürburgring Endurance Series with 15 overall victories, most recently in October 2023. Additionally, he has taken three wins at the Nürburgring 24 Hours, winning in 2012, 2019, and 2024.

== Race results ==
=== Complete Porsche Supercup results ===
(key) (Races in bold indicate pole position) (Races in italics indicate fastest lap)

Year	Team	Car	1	2	3	4	5	6	7	8	9	10	11	12	DC	Points
2003	Infineon Team Farnbacher PZM	Porsche 996 GT3	**ITA**; Ret	ESP; 2	**AUT**; 1	**MON**; 13	GER; 3	FRA; 6	GBR; 1	**GER**; 1	**HUN**; 1	ITA; 1	USA; DSQ	USA; 2	**1st**	**172**

=== Complete Deutsche Tourenwagen Masters results ===
(key) (Races in bold indicate pole position) (Races in italics indicate fastest lap)

Year	Team	Car	1	2	3	4	5	6	7	8	9	10	11	DC	Points
2005	Audi Sport Team Joest	Audi A4 DTM 2004	HOC; 10	LAU; 6	SPA; 11	BRN; 8	OSC; 9	NOR; Ret	NÜR; 14	ZAN; Ret	LAU; 13	IST; 13	HOC; 5	14th	8
2006	Audi Sport Team Rosberg	Audi A4 DTM 2005	HOC; 12	LAU; 11	OSC; 13	BRH; Ret	NOR; 9	NÜR; Ret	ZAN; 14	CAT; 6	BUG; Ret	HOC; Ret		14th	3

=== FIA GT competition results ===
==== FIA GT1 World Championship results ====
Year	Team	Car	1	2	3	4	5	6	7	8	9	10	11	12	13	14	15	16	17	18	Pos.	Points
2012	Belgian Audi Club Team WRT	Audi	NOG; QR; 2	NOG; CR; 2	ZOL; QR; 11	ZOL; CR; 10	NAV; QR; 8	NAV; QR; 8	SVK; QR; 6	SVK; CR; 5	ALG; QR; 3	ALG; CR; Ret	SVK; QR; Ret	SVK; CR; 4	MOS; QR; 3	MOS; CR; 3	NUR; QR; 7	NUR; CR; Ret	DON; QR; Ret	DON; CR; 7	8th	81

=== Complete FIA GT Series results ===
Year	Team	Car	Class	1	2	3	4	5	6	7	8	9	10	11	12	Pos.	Points
2013	Belgian Audi Club Team WRT	Audi R8 LMS ultra	Pro	NOG; QR; Ret	NOG; CR; 1	ZOL; QR; 5	ZOL; CR; 3	ZAN; QR; 4	ZAN; CR; 3	SVK; QR; 9	SVK; CR; 4	NAV; QR; 2	NAV; CR; 3	BAK; QR; 7	BAK; CR; 11	**2nd**	**110**

=== Complete Blancpain GT World Challenge Europe results ===
Year	Team	Car	Class	1	2	3	4	5	6	7	8	9	10	11	12	13	14	Pos.	Points
2015	Belgian Audi Club Team WRT	Audi R8 LMS ultra	Pro	NOG; QR; 11	NOG; CR; 6	BRH; QR; 8	BRH; CR; 9	ZOL; QR; Ret	ZOL; CR; DNS	MOS; QR; 11	MOS; CR; 8	ALG; QR; 6	ALG; CR; 12	MIS; QR; 8	MIS; CR; 13	ZAN; QR; Ret	ZAN; CR; Ret	21st	17
2016	ISR	Audi R8 LMS	Pro	MIS; QR; 8	MIS; CR; 5	BRH; QR; 17	BRH; CR; 20	NÜR; QR; Ret	NÜR; CR; 20	HUN; QR; 7	HUN; CR; 21	CAT; QR; 21	CAT; CR; 12					19th	10
2017	ISR	Audi R8 LMS	Pro	MIS; QR; 21	MIS; CR; 25	BRH; QR; 10	BRH; CR; Ret	ZOL; QR; 28	ZOL; CR; 30	HUN; QR; 26	HUN; CR; 14	NÜR; QR; Ret	NÜR; CR; Ret					NC	0
2019	Phoenix Racing	Audi R8 LMS	Pro	BRH; 1 Ret	BRH; 2; 13	MIS; 1; 22	MIS; 2; 12	ZAN; 1	ZAN; 2	NÜR; 1	NÜR; 2	HUN; 1	HUN; 2					NC	0

=== Complete WeatherTech SportsCar Championship results ===
(key) (Races in bold indicate pole position; results in italics indicate fastest lap)

Year	Team	Class	Make	Engine	1	2	3	4	5	6	7	8	9	10	11	Rank	Points
2014	GMG Racing	GTD	Audi R8 LMS ultra	Audi 5.2 L V10	DAY; 28	SEB	LGA	DET	WGL	MOS	IND	ELK	VIR	COA	PET	133rd	1
2016	Frikadelli Racing	GTD	Porsche 911 GT3 R	Porsche 4.0L Flat-6	DAY; 12	SEB	LGA	BEL	WGL	MOS	LIM	ELK	VIR	AUS	PET	53rd	20

=== 24 Hours of Nürburgring results ===
Year	Team	Co-Drivers	Car	Class	Laps	Pos.	Class Pos.
1998	(Germany) ACBL Remscheid e.V. im AvD	(Germany) Gunnar Hermann (Germany) Christoph Unterhuber	Ford Escort Cosworth	3	117	28th	4th
1999		(Germany) Harald Strukkamp (Germany) Frank Kuhlmann (Germany) Norbert Krull	Porsche 968 CS	A5	69	DNF	DNF
2000	(Germany) Kloeber-JVG Racing	(Germany) Frank Klaas (Germany) Michael Irmgartz (Austria) Franz Konrad	Porsche 996 Cup	A6	129	12th	7th
2001	(Germany) Zakspeed Motorsport	(Germany) Markus Grossmann (Germany) Franz Fabian (Germany) Timo Kluck	Chrysler Viper GTS-R	A7	61	DNF	DNF
2001	(Germany) MSC Ruhr-Blitz-Bochum e.V. im ADAC	(Germany) Wolfgang Drabiniok (Germany) Franz Fabian (Germany) Timo Kluck	Opel Astra OPC	V3	68	DNF	DNF
2004	(Germany) Infineon Team Abt Sportsline	(Germany) Christian Abt (Netherlands) Patrick Huisman (Austria) Karl Wendlinger	Abt-Audi TT-R	E1	140	4th	**3rd**
2006	(Germany) Land-Motorsport PZK	(Germany) Marc Basseng (Germany) Patrick Simon (Germany) Timo Scheider	Porsche 996 GT3	SP7	133	DNF	DNF
2007	(Germany) Land-Motorsport PZ Aschaffenburg	(Germany) Marc Basseng (Germany) Patrick Simon (Germany) Timo Scheider	Porsche 911 GT3-RSR	SP7	111	**3rd**	**2nd**
2007		(Norway) Atle Gulbrandsen (Norway) Roger Sandberg (Norway) Hakon Schjaerin	Audi A4	SP3	98	19th	**3rd**
2008	(Germany) HISAQ Competition	(France) Emmanuel Collard (United Kingdom) Marino Franchitti (United Kingdom) Richard Westbrook	Porsche 911 GT3-RSR	SP7	109	DNF	DNF
2009	(Germany) Phoenix Racing	(Germany) Marc Basseng (Switzerland) Marcel Fässler (Germany) Mike Rockenfeller	Audi R8 LMS	SP9 GT3	149	5th	4th
2010	(Germany) Phoenix Racing	(Germany) Marc Basseng (Germany) Mike Rockenfeller (Germany) Hans-Joachim Stuck	Audi R8 LMS	SP9 GT3	41	DNF	DNF
2011	(Germany) Audi Sport Team Phoenix	(Germany) Marc Basseng (Switzerland) Marcel Fässler (Germany) Mike Rockenfeller	Audi R8 LMS	SP9 GT3	155	**3rd**	**1st**
2011	(Germany) Audi Sport Team Phoenix	(Germany) Marc Hennerici (Germany) Christopher Haase (Germany) Markus Winkelhock	Audi R8 LMS	SP9 GT3	155	4th	**2nd**
2012	(Germany) Audi Sport Team Phoenix	(Germany) Marc Basseng (Germany) Christopher Haase (Germany) Markus Winkelhock	Audi R8 LMS	SP9 GT3	155	**1st**	**1st**
2012	(Germany) Audi Sport Team Phoenix	(Switzerland) Marcel Fässler (Germany) Christopher Mies (Germany) René Rast	Audi R8 LMS	SP9 GT3	151	5th	5th
2013	(Russia) G-Drive Racing by Phoenix	(Switzerland) Marcel Fässler (Germany) Mike Rockenfeller (Germany) Markus Winkelhock	Audi R8 LMS	SP9 GT3	87	5th	5th
2013	(Germany) Audi Sport Team Phoenix	(Germany) Michael Ammermüller (Germany) Ferdinand Stuck (Germany) Johannes Stuck	Audi R8 LMS	SP9 GT3	86	8th	8th
2014	(Germany) Phoenix Racing	(Germany) Marc Basseng (Switzerland) Marcel Fässler (Belgium) Laurens Vanthoor	Audi R8 LMS Ultra	SP9 GT3	8	DNF	DNF
2015	(Germany) Audi Sport Team Phoenix	(Germany) Marc Basseng (Switzerland) Marcel Fässler (Germany) Mike Rockenfeller	Audi R8 LMS	SP9 GT3	55	DNF	DNF
2016	(Germany) Phoenix Racing	(Denmark) Anders Fjordbach (Switzerland) Edoardo Mortara (Austria) Nikolaus Mayr-Melnhof	Audi R8 LMS	SP9 GT3	117	DNF	DNF
2016	(Germany) Audi Sport Team Phoenix	(Germany) Christopher Haase (Germany) René Rast (Germany) Markus Winkelhock	Audi R8 LMS	SP9 GT3	67	8th	8th
2017	(Germany) Phoenix Racing	(Germany) Dennis Busch (Denmark) Nicolaj Møller Madsen (Germany) Mike Rockenfeller	Audi R8 LMS	SP9 GT3	149	18th	16th
2017	(Germany) Audi Sport Team WRT	(Switzerland) Nico Müller (Germany) René Rast (Belgium) Frédéric Vervisch	Audi R8 LMS	SP9 GT3	32	DNF	DNF
2018	(Germany) Audi Sport Team Phoenix	(Germany) Christopher Haase (Switzerland) Nico Müller (Belgium) Frédéric Vervisch	Audi R8 LMS	SP9 GT3	133	7th	6th
2019	(Germany) Audi Sport Team Phoenix	(Germany) Pierre Kaffer (Belgium) Dries Vanthoor (Belgium) Frédéric Vervisch	Audi R8 LMS Evo	SP9 PRO	157	**1st**	**1st**
2019	(Germany) Phoenix Racing	(Netherlands) Jeroen Bleekemolen (Germany) Vincent Kolb (Germany) Kim-Luis Schramm	Audi R8 LMS Evo	SP9 PRO	154	7th	7th
2020	(Germany) Audi Sport Team Phoenix	(Switzerland) Nico Müller (Belgium) Dries Vanthoor (Belgium) Frédéric Vervisch	Audi R8 LMS Evo	SP9 PRO	85	5th	5th
2020	(Germany) Phoenix Racing	(Italy) Michele Beretta (France) Jules Gounon (Germany) Kim-Luis Schramm	Audi R8 LMS Evo	SP9 PRO	65	DNF	DNF
2021	(Germany) Phoenix Racing	(Italy) Michele Beretta (Germany) Kim-Luis Schramm (Denmark) Nicki Thiim	Audi R8 LMS Evo	SP9 PRO	56	17th	16th
2021	(Germany) Audi Sport Team Phoenix	(Italy) Mattia Drudi (Netherlands) Robin Frijns (Belgium) Dries Vanthoor	Audi R8 LMS Evo	SP9 PRO	17	DNF	DNF
2022	(Germany) Audi Sport Team Phoenix	(Switzerland) Ricardo Feller (Germany) Vincent Kolb (South Africa) Kelvin van der Linde	Audi R8 LMS Evo II	SP9 PRO	57	DNF	DNF
2023	(Germany) Scherer Sport PHX	(Germany) Vincent Kolb (United Kingdom) Alexander Sims (Netherlands) Renger van der Zande	Audi R8 LMS Evo II	SP9 PRO	80	DNF	DNF
2024	(Germany) Scherer Sport PHX	(Switzerland) Ricardo Feller (Germany) Dennis Marschall (Germany) Christopher Mies	Audi R8 LMS Evo II	SP9 PRO	50	**1st**	**1st**
2025	(Germany) HRT Ford Performance	(India) Arjun Maini (Norway) Dennis Olsen (Germany) Jusuf Owega	Ford Mustang GT3	SP9 PRO	27	DNF	DNF
2026	(Germany) HRT Ford Racing	(Germany) Christopher Mies (Norway) Dennis Olsen (Belgium) Frédéric Vervisch	Ford Mustang GT3 Evo	SP9 PRO	155	7th	6th
2026	(Germany) HRT Ford Racing	(India) Arjun Maini (Switzerland) Fabio Scherer (Germany) David Schumacher	Ford Mustang GT3 Evo	SP9 PRO	24	DNF	DNF

=== 24 Hours of Spa results ===
Year	Team	Co-Drivers	Car	Class	Laps	Pos.	Class Pos.
2007	(Germany) All-Inkl.com Racing	(France) Christophe Bouchut (Germany) Stefan Mücke	Lamborghini Murciélago R-GT	GT1	83	DNF	DNF
2010	(Belgium) WRT Belgian Audi Club	(Germany) Frank Biela (Belgium) Grégory Franchi (Belgium) Vincent Vosse	Audi R8 LMS	GT3	57	DNF	DNF
2011	(Germany) Audi Sport Team Phoenix	(Germany) Marc Basseng (Germany) Christopher Haase	Audi R8 LMS	GT3 Pro	224	DNF	DNF
2012	(Germany) Audi Sport Performance Team	(Italy) Andrea Piccini (Germany) René Rast	Audi R8 LMS Ultra	GT3 Pro	509	**1st**	**1st**
2013	(Belgium) Belgian Audi Club Team WRT	(Germany) André Lotterer (Germany) Christopher Mies	Audi R8 LMS Ultra	GT3 Pro	558	**3rd**	**3rd**
2014	(Belgium) Belgian Audi Club Team WRT	(Germany) Christopher Mies (United Kingdom) James Nash	Audi R8 LMS Ultra	GT3 Pro	526	**3rd**	**3rd**
2015	(Belgium) Audi Sport Team WRT	(Switzerland) Nico Müller (Monaco) Stéphane Ortelli	Audi R8 LMS Ultra	GT3 Pro	535	**2nd**	**2nd**
2016	(Germany) Audi Sport Team Phoenix	(Germany) Christopher Mies (Germany) Markus Winkelhock	Audi R8 LMS	GT3 Pro	425	DNF	DNF
2017	(Czech Republic) Audi Sport Team ISR	(Germany) Pierre Kaffer (South Africa) Kelvin van der Linde	Audi R8 LMS	GT3 Pro	543	9th	9th
2019	(Belgium) Audi Sport Team WRT	(Spain) Alex Riberas (Belgium) Dries Vanthoor	Audi R8 LMS	GT3 Pro	358	25th	21st
2020	(Belgium) Belgian Audi Club Team WRT	(Switzerland) Edoardo Mortara (Belgium) Charles Weerts	Audi R8 LMS Evo	GT3 Pro	70	DNF	DNF

Sporting positions
Preceded by Stéphane Ortelli	Porsche Supercup champion 2003	Succeeded by Wolf Henzler
Preceded by Marc Lieb	Porsche Carrera Cup Germany champion 2003	Succeeded by Mike Rockenfeller
