= 2012 FIA GT1 Nogaro round =

Layout of the Circuit Paul Armagnac

The 2012 Easter Cup (French: Coupes de Pâques 2012) is a motor race that will be the first of ten rounds in the 2012 FIA GT1 World Championship season. It will take place at the Circuit Paul Armagnac in France on 8 April 2012. The race will be the first time the opening race of the GT1 World Championship season has not taken place at the Yas Marina Circuit in Abu Dhabi. Eighteen cars representing nine manufacturers will take part in the race, including six new manufacturers and seven new teams. The event will also be the first round of the 2012 FIA GT3 European Championship season.

AF Corse's Toni Vilander and Filip Salaquarda started the qualifying race from pole position. The qualifying race was won by Audi drivers Stéphane Ortelli and Laurens Vanthoor, with team-mates Frank Stippler and Oliver Jarvis in second place.

== Qualifying ==
=== Qualifying result ===
Qualifying decides the grid order for the Qualifying Race, which in turn decides the grid order for the Championship Race. It is divided into three twenty-minute sessions. Each car has two drivers, designated "Driver 1" and "Driver 2". Driver 1 takes part in the first and third sessions, while Driver 2 takes part in the second session. At the end of the first session, the three slowest cars are eliminated, while the six slowest cars in the second session are also eliminated. The third and final session is contested between the remaining eight cars.

As the No. 11 Sunred Ford of Emmanuel Moncini and Andy Soucek was withdrawn from the event, three cars were eliminated from the first session instead of the normal four.

Pos.	No.	Driver 1	Team	Session 1	Session 2	Session 3	Grid
Pos.	No.	Driver 2	Team	Session 1	Session 2	Session 3	Grid
1	3	(Finland) Toni Vilander	(Italy) AF Corse	1:26.776	1:26.907	1:26.138	1
1	3	(Czech Republic) Filip Salaquarda	(Italy) AF Corse	1:26.776	1:26.907	1:26.138	1
2	32	(Monaco) Stéphane Ortelli	(Belgium) Belgian Audi Club Team WRT	1:26.930	1:26.750	1:26.250	2
2	32	(Belgium) Laurens Vanthoor	(Belgium) Belgian Audi Club Team WRT	1:26.930	1:26.750	1:26.250	2
3	33	(Germany) Frank Stippler	(Belgium) Belgian Audi Club Team WRT	1:26.915	1:26.736	1:26.292	3
3	33	(United Kingdom) Oliver Jarvis	(Belgium) Belgian Audi Club Team WRT	1:26.915	1:26.736	1:26.292	3
4	38	(Germany) Marc Basseng	(Germany) All-Inkl.com Münnich Motorsport	1:27.617	1:26.876	1:26.876	4
4	38	(Germany) Markus Winkelhock	(Germany) All-Inkl.com Münnich Motorsport	1:27.617	1:26.876	1:26.876	4
5	4	(Belgium) Enzo Ide	(Italy) AF Corse	1:27.932	1:26.705	1:27.010	5
5	4	(Italy) Francesco Castellacci	(Italy) AF Corse	1:27.932	1:26.705	1:27.010	5
6	37	(Netherlands) Nicky Pastorelli	(Germany) All-Inkl.com Münnich Motorsport	1:29.163	1:26.916	1:27.020	6
6	37	(Germany) Thomas Jäger	(Germany) All-Inkl.com Münnich Motorsport	1:29.163	1:26.916	1:27.020	6
7	24	(Germany) Albert von Thurn und Taxis	(Germany) Reiter Engineering	1:27.418	1:26.400	no time^{1}	7
7	24	(Czech Republic) Tomáš Enge	(Germany) Reiter Engineering	1:27.418	1:26.400	no time^{1}	7
8	2	(France) Grégoire Demoustier	(France) Hexis Racing	1:28.873	1:27.017	no time	8
8	2	(Portugal) Álvaro Parente	(France) Hexis Racing	1:28.873	1:27.017	no time	8
9	9	(France) Mike Parisy	Exim Bank Team China	1:27.220	1:27.099		9
9	9	(New Zealand) Matt Halliday	Exim Bank Team China	1:27.220	1:27.099		9
10	25	(Hong Kong) Darryl O'Young	(Germany) Reiter Engineering	1:27.058	1:27.321		10
10	25	(Netherlands) Peter Kox	(Germany) Reiter Engineering	1:27.058	1:27.321		10
11	17	(Austria) Nikolaus Mayr-Melnhof	(Germany) Vita4One Racing Team	1:28.571	1:27.765		11
11	17	(Austria) Mathias Lauda	(Germany) Vita4One Racing Team	1:28.571	1:27.765		11
12	18	(Netherlands) Yelmer Buurman	(Germany) Vita4One Racing Team	1:28.308	1:27.895		12
12	18	(Germany) Michael Bartels	(Germany) Vita4One Racing Team	1:28.308	1:27.895		12
13	7	(Belgium) Maxime Martin	Valmon Racing Team Russia	1:28.724	1:32.763		13
13	7	(Russia) Alexey Vasilyev	Valmon Racing Team Russia	1:28.724	1:32.763		13
14	1	(France) Frédéric Makowiecki	(France) Hexis Racing	1:28.004	no time		14
14	1	(Netherlands) Stef Dusseldorp	(France) Hexis Racing	1:28.004	no time		14
15	8	(France) Benjamin Lariche	Exim Bank Team China	1:29.325			15
15	8	(China) Ren Wei	Exim Bank Team China	1:29.325			15
16	6	(Austria) Andreas Zuber	Valmon Racing Team Russia	1:29.921			16
16	6	(Russia) Sergey Afanasyev	Valmon Racing Team Russia	1:29.921			16
17	10	(Serbia) Miloš Pavlović	(Spain) Sunred	1:31.835			17
17	10	(Italy) Matteo Cressoni	(Spain) Sunred	1:31.835			17

Notes:

- ^1 — The No. 24 Reiter Lamborghini had its Qualifying 3 times cancelled following a stewards decision.

== Race results ==
=== Qualifying Race ===
Pos	No.	Team	Drivers	Manufacturer	Laps	Time/Retired
1	32	(Belgium) Belgian Audi Club Team WRT	(Belgium) Laurens Vanthoor (Monaco) Stéphane Ortelli	Audi	35	
2	33	(Belgium) Belgian Audi Club Team WRT	(Germany) Frank Stippler (United Kingdom) Oliver Jarvis	Audi	35	+6.030
3	24	(Germany) Reiter Engineering	(Germany) Albert von Thurn und Taxis (Czech Republic) Tomáš Enge	Lamborghini	35	+6.914
4	2	(France) Hexis Racing	(Portugal) Álvaro Parente (France) Grégoire Demoustier	McLaren	35	+7.164
5	3	(Italy) AF Corse	(Czech Republic) Filip Salaquarda (Finland) Toni Vilander	Ferrari	35	+31.293
6	38	(Germany) All-Inkl.com Münnich Motorsport	(Germany) Marc Basseng (Germany) Markus Winkelhock	Mercedes-Benz	35	+33.785
7	37	(Germany) All-Inkl.com Münnich Motorsport	(Netherlands) Nicky Pastorelli (Germany) Thomas Jäger	Mercedes-Benz	35	+34.414
8	25	(Germany) Reiter Engineering	(Netherlands) Peter Kox (Hong Kong) Darryl O'Young	Lamborghini	35	+47.177
9	9	Exim Bank Team China	(France) Mike Parisy (New Zealand) Matt Halliday	Porsche	35	+48.622
10	4	(Italy) AF Corse	(Italy) Francesco Castellacci (Belgium) Enzo Ide	Ferrari	35	+49.997
11	17	(Germany) Vita4One Racing Team	(Austria) Mathias Lauda (Austria) Nikolaus Mayr-Melnhof	BMW	35	+1:02.466
12	18	(Germany) Vita4One Racing Team	(Germany) Michael Bartels (Netherlands) Yelmer Buurman	BMW	35	+1:27.791^{1}
13	6	Valmon Racing Team Russia	(Russia) Sergey Afanasyev (Austria) Andreas Zuber	Aston Martin	34	+1 Lap
14	8	Exim Bank Team China	(China) Ren Wei (France) Benjamin Lariche	Porsche	34	+1 Lap
15	10	(Spain) Sunred	(Serbia) Miloš Pavlović (Italy) Matteo Cressoni	Ford	33	+2 Laps
16	7	Valmon Racing Team Russia	(Russia) Alexey Vasilyev (Belgium) Maxime Martin	Aston Martin	33	+2 Laps
DNS	1	(France) Hexis Racing	(France) Frédéric Makowiecki (Netherlands) Stef Dusseldorp	McLaren	–	Did not start

Notes:

- ^1 — The No. 18 Vita4One BMW was given a 30 second post-race penalty for failing to turn off their engine during their pit stop.

=== Championship Race ===
Pos	No.	Team	Drivers	Manufacturer	Laps	Time/Retired
1	32	(Belgium) Belgian Audi Club Team WRT	(Belgium) Laurens Vanthoor (Monaco) Stéphane Ortelli	Audi	40	
2	33	(Belgium) Belgian Audi Club Team WRT	(Germany) Frank Stippler (United Kingdom) Oliver Jarvis	Audi	40	+3.731
3	38	(Germany) All-Inkl.com Münnich Motorsport	(Germany) Marc Basseng (Germany) Markus Winkelhock	Mercedes-Benz	40	+4.421
4	37	(Germany) All-Inkl.com Münnich Motorsport	(Netherlands) Nicky Pastorelli (Germany) Thomas Jäger	Mercedes-Benz	40	+6.366
5	4	(Italy) AF Corse	(Italy) Francesco Castellacci (Belgium) Enzo Ide	Ferrari	40	+18.925
6	3	(Italy) AF Corse	(Finland) Toni Vilander (Czech Republic) Filip Salaquarda	Ferrari	40	+21.231
7	25	(Germany) Reiter Engineering	(Netherlands) Peter Kox (Hong Kong) Darryl O'Young	Lamborghini	40	+21.682
8	24	(Germany) Reiter Engineering	(Czech Republic) Tomáš Enge (Germany) Albert von Thurn und Taxis	Lamborghini	40	+35.234
9	9	Exim Bank Team China	(France) Mike Parisy (New Zealand) Matt Halliday	Porsche	40	+49.619
10	18	(Germany) Vita4One Racing Team	(Germany) Michael Bartels (Netherlands) Yelmer Buurman	BMW	40	+1:00.307
11	17	(Germany) Vita4One Racing Team	(Austria) Mathias Lauda (Austria) Nikolaus Mayr-Melnhof	BMW	40	+1:05.808
12	7	Valmon Racing Team Russia	(Belgium) Maxime Martin (Russia) Alexey Vasilyev	Aston Martin	40	+1:27.167
13	6	Valmon Racing Team Russia	(Russia) Sergey Afanasyev (Austria) Andreas Zuber	Aston Martin	39	+1 Lap
14	10	(Spain) Sunred	(Serbia) Miloš Pavlović (Italy) Matteo Cressoni	Ford	38	+2 Laps
15	8	Exim Bank Team China	(China) Ren Wei (France) Benjamin Lariche	Porsche	37	+3 Laps
16 DNF	2	(France) Hexis Racing	(France) Grégoire Demoustier (Portugal) Álvaro Parente	McLaren	18	Retired
17 DNF	1	(France) Hexis Racing	(France) Frédéric Makowiecki (Netherlands) Stef Dusseldorp	McLaren	3	Throttle

FIA GT1 World Championship
Previous race: None	2012 season	Next race: Zolder
