= 2012 24 Hours of Nürburgring =

Endurance motor race in Germany

2012 ADAC 24 Hours of Nürburgring

Seasons
- ← 2011 2013 →

Nürburgring 24h track (Nordschleife+GP Circuit without Mercedes-Arena)

The 2012 ADAC Zurich 24 Hours of Nürburgring was the 40th running of the 24 Hours of Nürburgring. It took place over May 19–20, 2012.

== Resume ==
For 2012: The race was limited to a maximum of 190 cars/entries (down from a limit of 250 in 2011), which started in 3 groups of up to 70 cars (maximum). Each entry must have between 2 drivers (minimum) and 4 drivers (maximum). Drivers may drive more than one car (2 maximum). All drivers were permitted to drive 3 hours per stint (maximum) with all refuelling and pit stops included. All drivers were required to take a MINIMUM REST TIME of 2 hours (whether driving 1 or 2 cars).

New in 2012: There was a new "Top-40" qualifying format for the 40 fastest cars on the starting grid, which took place, Friday, after the first 2 qualifying sessions: "the 40 fastest teams will battle it out on Friday afternoon for the positions at the front end of starting group 1".

As in previous years, the Top 40 Qualifying cars eligible to start, must have flashing lights installed (for better identification of the Top 40 competitors) behind the windscreen on the passenger’s side.

=== Classes for 2012 ===
In 2012, there were 28 classes split into 4 divisions.

2012: Classes: ADAC Zurich 24h-Rennen
Division	Classes
Division 1 – Group 24h-Special	Normally aspirated engines: SP3, SP4, SP5, SP6, SP7, SP8, SP9 (FIA-GT3), SP10 (SRO-GT4); Turbo engines: SP3T, SP4T, SP8T; Diesel engines (Turbo): D1T, D2T, D3T, D4T; AT (gas driven vehicles, liquid gas, natural gas, HVO, alternative Diesel fuels)
Division 1 – Group E1-XP	E1-XP1, E1-XP2, E1-XP Hybrid
Division 1 – Group VLN Series Production cars	V2, V3, V4, V5, V6
Division 2 – Group N (Production Touring Cars)	N2, N3, N4, N5

== Race results ==
Class winners in bold.

40th ADAC Zurich 24h-Rennen
Pos	Class	No	Team	Drivers	Vehicle	Laps
1	**SP9**	**3**	**(Germany) Audi Sport Team Phoenix**	**(Germany) Frank Stippler (Germany) Christopher Haase (Germany) Marc Basseng (Germany) Markus Winkelhock**	**Audi R8 LMS Ultra**	**155**
2	SP9	26	(Germany) Mamerow Racing	(Germany) Christian Mamerow (Germany) Michael Ammermüller (Germany) Christian Abt (Germany) Armin Hahne	Audi R8 LMS Ultra	155
3	SP9	66	(Germany) Hankook Team Heico	(Sweden) Andreas Simonsen (Germany) Pierre Kaffer (Netherlands) Christiaan Frankenhout (Germany) Lance David Arnold	Mercedes-Benz SLS AMG GT3	155
4	SP9	29	(Belgium) Marc VDS Racing Team	(Belgium) Maxime Martin (Belgium) Bas Leinders (Finland) Markus Palttala	BMW Z4 GT3	154
5	SP9	2	(Germany) Audi Sport Team Phoenix	(Germany) René Rast (Germany) Frank Stippler (Switzerland) Marcel Fässler (Germany) Christopher Mies	Audi R8 LMS Ultra	151
6	SP9	28		(Germany) Sabine Schmitz (Netherlands) Patrick Huisman (Germany) Klaus Abbelen (Germany) Christopher Brück	Porsche 997 GT3-R	151
7	SP9	19	(Germany) BMW Team Schubert	(Germany) Jörg Müller (Germany) Dirk Müller (Germany) Uwe Alzen (Germany) Dirk Adorf	BMW Z4 GT3	150
8	SP9	20	(Germany) BMW Team Schubert	(Germany) Dirk Adorf (Germany) Dominik Schwager (Germany) Claudia Hürtgen (Germany) Nico Bastian	BMW Z4 GT3	150
9	SP9	18	(Germany) BMW Team Vita4One	(Germany) Marco Wittmann (Portugal) Pedro Lamy (Sweden) Richard Göransson (Germany) Jens Klingmann	BMW Z4 GT3	150
10	SP9	21	(Germany) Rowe Racing	(Germany) Michael Zehe (United States) Mark Bullitt (Germany) Roland Rehfeld (Germany) Marco Hartung	Mercedes-Benz SLS AMG GT3	150
11	SP9	27	(Germany) Timbuli Racing	(Germany) Marc Hennerici (Austria) Norbert Siedler (Germany) Marco Seefried (Germany) Dennis Busch	Porsche 997 GT3-R	149
12	**E1-XP**	1	**(United States) Global Partner Enterprise SA**	**(Italy) Nicola Larini** **(Italy) Fabrizio Giovanardi** **(Germany) Manuel Lauck**	**Ferrari P4/5 Competizione**	**147**
13	**SP7**	150	**(Germany) Kremer Racing**	**(Germany) Wolfgang Kauffmann** **(Germany) Alfrid Heger** **(Germany) Dieter Schornstein** **(Germany) Michael Küke**	**Porsche 911 GT3 KR**	**147**
14	SP9	16	(Germany) Black Falcon	(Germany) Hannes Plesse (Ukraine) Andril Lebed (Germany) Christian Bracke (Germany) Reinhold Renger	Mercedes-Benz SLS AMG GT3	147
15	**SP8**	83	**(Japan) Gazoo Racing**	**(Japan) Takayuki Kinoshita** **(Japan) Akira Iida** **(Japan) Juichi Wakisaka**	**Lexus LFA**	**147**

== Bibliography ==
- Jörg-Richard Ufer & Tim Upietz. 24 Stunden Nürburgring Nordschleife 2012. Gruppe C Motorsport Verlag. ISBN 978-3-928540-68-1.
