= Ren Wei (racing driver) =

Chinese businessman and racing driver (born 1983)

- Nationality: (China) Chinese
- Born: 6 June 1983 (age 43) Beijing

FIA GT1 World Championship career
- Debut season: 2012
- Current team: Exim Bank Team China
- Car number: 8
- Starts: 4

Previous series
- 2010–11 2011–12 2012: China Formula Grand Prix; Volkswagen Scirocco R-Cup China; Porsche Carrera Cup Asia

Ren Wei (born 9 June 1983) is a Chinese businessman and racing driver who currently competes in the FIA GT1 World Championship for Exim Bank Team China Porsche. Ren entered motorsports in 2010 with the China Formula Grand Prix open wheel series before progressing to the Chinese Volkswagen Scirocco R-Cup in 2011. In 2012 Ren debuted in international racing with the Porsche Carrera Cup Asia, before being signed by Mühlner Motorsport for the FIA GT1 World Championship as part of the Exim Bank Team China squad. Ren is the second Chinese driver in the GT1 series after Ho-Pin Tung, and the first natural-born Chinese to participate.

== Complete GT1 World Championship results ==
Year	Team	Car	1	2	3	4	5	6	7	8	9	10	11	12	13	14	15	16	17	18	Pos	Points
2012	Exim Bank Team China	Porsche	NOG; QR; 14	NOG; CR; 15	ZOL; QR; Ret	ZOL; CR; 17	NAV; QR	NAV; QR	SVK; QR	SVK; CR	ALG; QR	ALG; CR	SVK; QR	SVK; CR	MOS; QR	MOS; CR	NUR; QR	NUR; CR	DON; QR	DON; CR	32nd	0

* Season still in progress.
