= Grégoire Demoustier =

French-Belgian racing driver

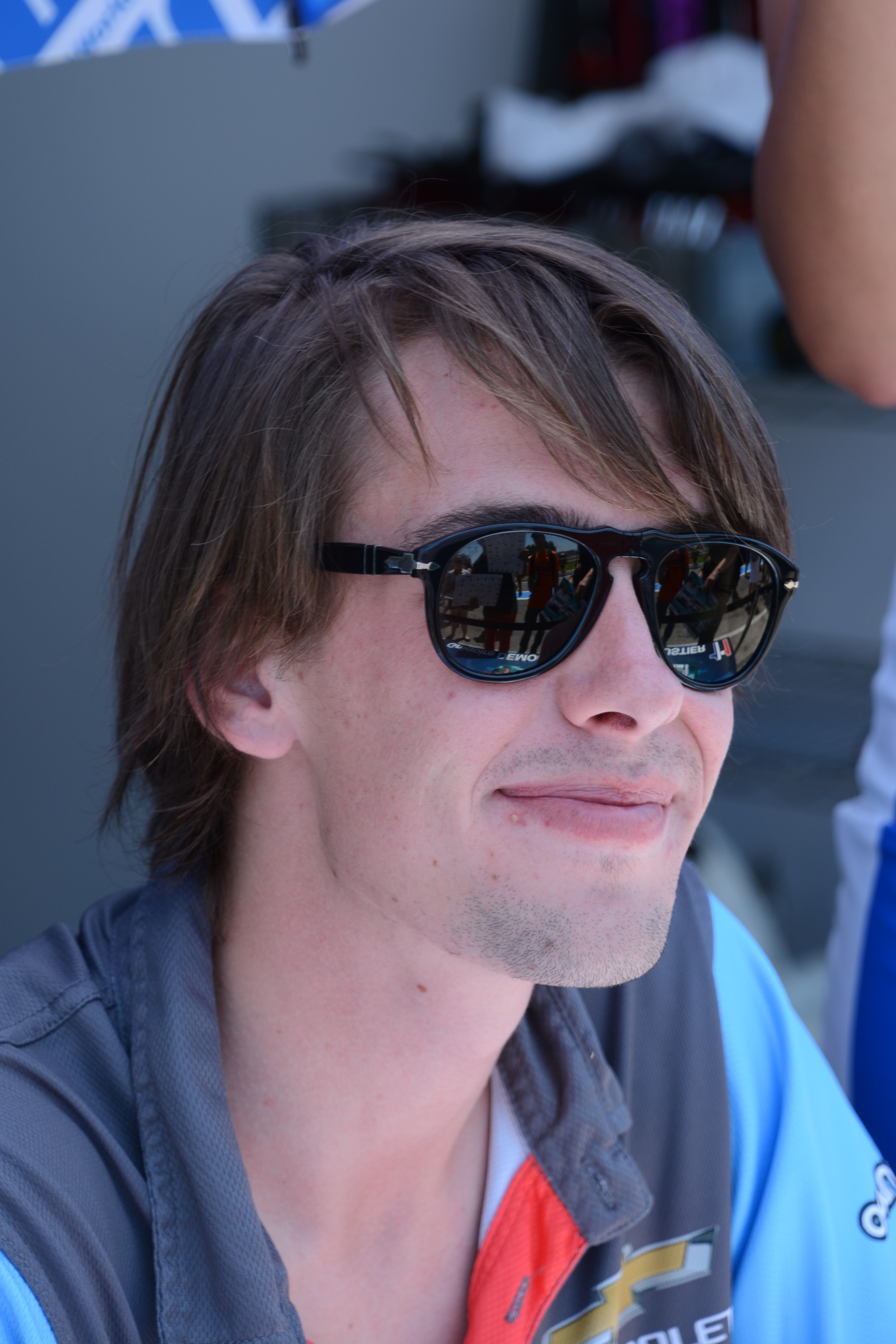
- Grégoire Demoustier at the 2015 FIA WTCC Race of France at the Circuit Paul Ricard.
- Nationality: (France) French
- Born: 26 January 1991 (age 35) Villeneuve-d'Ascq, France

World Touring Car Championship career
- Debut season: 2015
- Current team: Sébastien Loeb Racing
- Categorisation: FIA Bronze (2010–2012); FIA Silver (2013–)
- Car number: 11
- Former teams: Craft Bamboo
- Starts: 46
- Wins: 0
- Poles: 0
- Fastest laps: 0
- Best finish: 16th in 2016

Previous series
- 2013 2012 2011 2011 2010–11 2010 2009 2009 2008: FIA GT Series; FIA GT1 World Championship; Formula Renault 2.0 Alps; Eurocup Formula Renault 2.0; FIA GT3 European Championship; FFSA GT Championship; Formula Renault 2.0 WEC; Formula BMW Europe; THP Spider Cup

Grégoire Demoustier (born 26 January 1991 in Villeneuve-d'Ascq) is a French-Belgian racing driver, who competes in the World Touring Car Championship for Sébastien Loeb Racing.

== Career ==
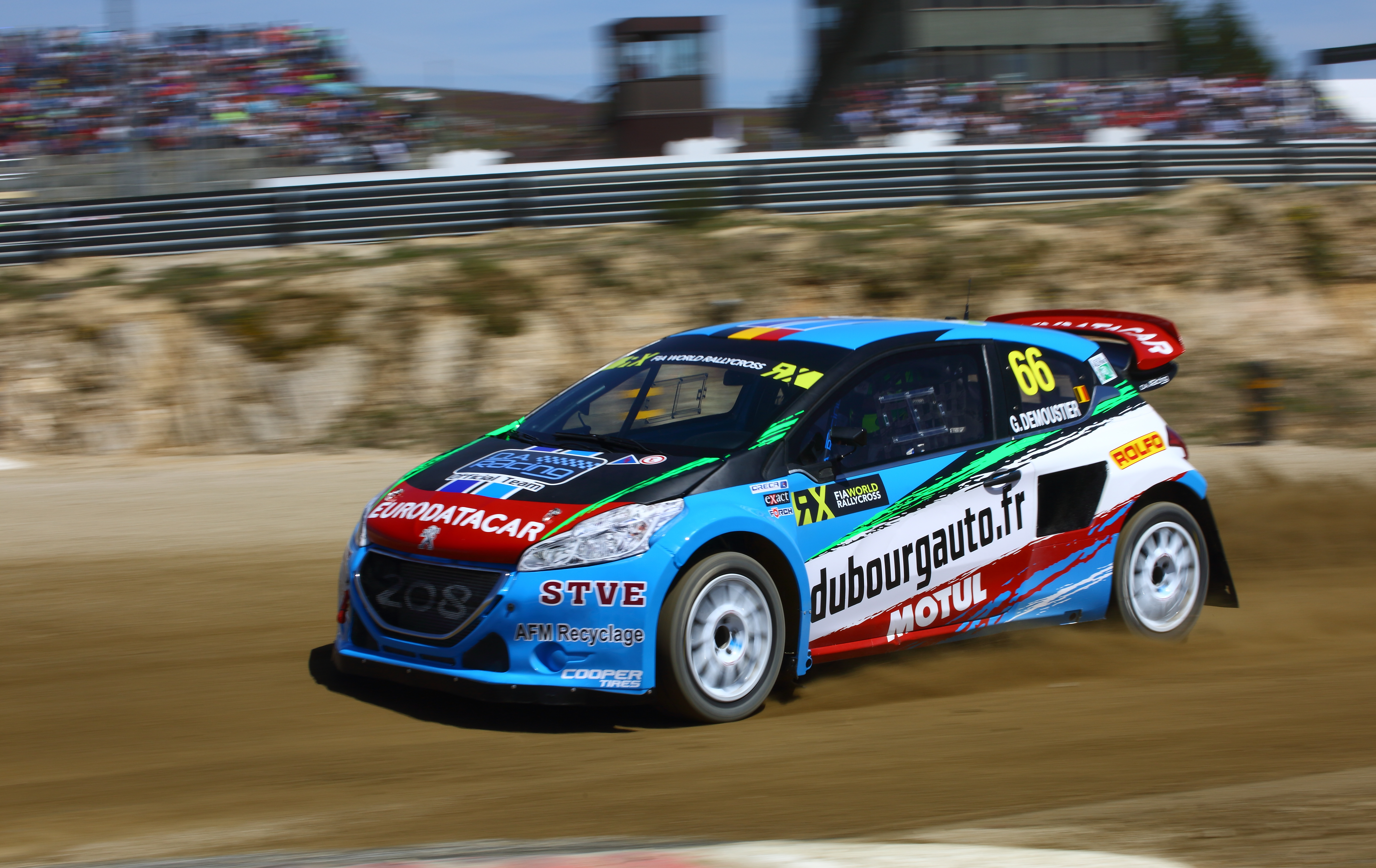
Demoustier competing at the 2017 World RX of Portugal.

Demoustier began his career in 2008, competing in the THP Spider Cup and the Mitjet Series. In 2009, he debuted in single-seaters, racing in Formula BMW Europe. In 2010, he began taking part in GT racing, contesting the FFSA GT Championship in an Aston Martin DBRS9 for the LMP Motorsport team, and co-driven by Grégory Guilvert. He also took part in the 24 Hours of Spa, finishing 21st in a Gulf Team First Lamborghini Gallardo LP560 GT3. He also raced in the final four rounds of the FIA GT3 European Championship, the first two in a Graff Racing Corvette Z06.R GT3 and the final two in a Team Rosberg Audi R8 LMS.

Demoustier began 2011 with a brief return to single-seaters in Formula Renault 2.0 Alps. He headed back to GT3 for the third round of the season, racing a Mercedes-Benz SLS AMG GT3 for Graff Racing. He took a podium at the season finale when he switched cars within the team to partner Mike Parisy, who claimed the series runner-up spot in the process.

In 2012, Demoustier raced in the FIA GT1 World Championship for Hexis Racing in their McLaren MP4-12C GT3.

Demoustier competed in the 2012, 2013 and 2014 Blancpain Endurance Series for ART Grand Prix with a McLaren MP4-12C, winning the 2014 Blancpain 3 Hours of Monza. In 2014, he also drove an ART McLaren at the European Le Mans Series.

In 2015, Demoustier remained in the Blancpain Endurance Series, switching to a Saintéloc Audi R8. He also drove a Chevrolet Cruze at the World Touring Car Championship. Demoustier returned to Saintéloc for the 2023 season, pairing with Christopher Mies in the Sprint Cup, and joining Erwan Bastard and Paul Evrard in a Silver Cup entry for the Endurance Cup.

== Racing record ==
=== Complete Eurocup Formula Renault 2.0 results ===
(key) (Races in bold indicate pole position; races in italics indicate fastest lap)

Year	Entrant	1	2	3	4	5	6	7	8	9	10	11	12	13	14	DC	Points
2011	Tech 1 Racing	ALC; 1 Ret	ALC; 2; 20	SPA; 1; 31	SPA; 2 DNS	NÜR; 1	NÜR; 2	HUN; 1	HUN; 2	SIL; 1	SIL; 2	LEC; 1	LEC; 2	CAT; 1	CAT; 2	41st	0

=== Complete Formula Renault 2.0 Alps Series results ===
(key) (Races in bold indicate pole position; races in italics indicate fastest lap)

Year	Team	1	2	3	4	5	6	7	8	9	10	11	12	13	14	Pos	Points
2011	Tech 1 Racing	MNZ; 1; 11	MNZ; 2; 12	IMO; 1	IMO; 2	PAU; 1 Ret	PAU; 2; 10	RBR; 1; 14	RBR; 2; 16	HUN; 1	HUN; 2	LEC; 1	LEC; 2	SPA; 1	SPA; 2	23rd	26

=== Complete GT1 World Championship results ===
(key) (Races in bold indicate pole position) (Races in italics indicate fastest lap)

Year	Team	Car	1	2	3	4	5	6	7	8	9	10	11	12	13	14	15	16	17	18	Pos	Points
2012	Hexis Racing	McLaren MP4-12C GT3	NOG; QR; 4	NOG; CR; Ret	ZOL; QR; 10	ZOL; CR; 7	NAV; QR; 2	NAV; QR; 4	SVK; QR; Ret	SVK; CR; Ret	ALG; QR; 8	ALG; CR; Ret	SVK; QR; 9	SVK; CR; 9	MOS; QR; 6	MOS; CR; 2	NUR; QR; 5	NUR; CR; Ret	DON; QR; 3	DON; CR; 3	11th	65

=== Complete FIA GT Series results ===
(key) (Races in bold indicate pole position) (Races in italics indicate fastest lap)

Year	Team	Car	Class	1	2	3	4	5	6	7	8	9	10	11	12	Pos.	Points
2013	Von Ryan Racing	McLaren MP4-12C GT3	Pro-Am	NOG; QR	NOG; CR	ZOL; QR	ZOL; CR	ZAN; QR	ZAN; QR	SVK; QR	SVK; CR	NAV; QR; 14†	NAV; CR; Ret†			NC	0
2013	Belgian Audi Club Team WRT	Audi R8 LMS ultra	Pro											BAK; QR; 17	BAK; CR; Ret	NC	0

^{†} Demoustier was a guest driver at the Navarra round making him ineligible for points.

=== Complete British GT Championship results ===
(key) (Races in bold indicate pole position) (Races in italics indicate fastest lap)

Year	Team	Car	Class	1	2	3	4	5	6	7	8	9	10	DC	Points
2013	Von Ryan Racing	McLaren MP4-12C GT3	GT3	OUL; 1	OUL; 2	ROC; 1; 9	SIL; 1; 32	SNE; 1; 3	SNE; 2; 11	BRH; 1; 2	ZAN; 1	ZAN; 2	DON; 1; 7	13th	54

=== Complete World Touring Car Championship results ===
(key) (Races in bold indicate pole position) (Races in italics indicate fastest lap)

Year	Team	Car	1	2	3	4	5	6	7	8	9	10	11	12	13	14	15	16	17	18	19	20	21	22	23	24	DC	Points
2015	Craft Bamboo	Chevrolet RML Cruze TC1	ARG; 1; 12	ARG; 2; 10	MAR; 1 Ret	MAR; 2 Ret	HUN; 1; 12	HUN; 2; 10	GER; 1; 13	GER; 2; 12	RUS; 1; 15	RUS; 2; 13	SVK; 1 Ret	SVK; 2; 13	FRA; 1; 13	FRA; 2; 14	POR; 1; 16	POR; 2; 12	JPN; 1; 12	JPN; 2; 13	CHN; 1 Ret	CHN; 2; 12	THA; 1; 9	THA; 2; 10	QAT; 1; 18†	QAT; 2; 11	20th	5
2016	Sébastien Loeb Racing	Citroën C-Elysée WTCC	FRA; 1; 10	FRA; 2; 13	SVK; 1; 13	SVK; 2; 12	HUN; 1; 7	HUN; 2 Ret	MAR; 1; 8	MAR; 2 Ret	GER; 1; 11	GER; 2; 14	RUS; 1; 16	RUS; 2; 13	POR; 1; 16	POR; 2; 12	ARG; 1; 12	ARG; 2; 15	JPN; 1; 17	JPN; 2; 15	CHN; 1; 13	CHN; 2; 17	QAT; 1; 15	QAT; 2; 12			16th	11

^{†} Did not finish the race, but was classified as he completed over 90% of the race distance.

=== Complete FIA World Rallycross Championship results ===
(key)

==== Supercar ====
Year	Entrant	Car	1	2	3	4	5	6	7	8	9	10	11	12	WRX	Points
2017	DA Racing	Peugeot 208	BAR; 19	POR; 21†	HOC	BEL; 22	GBR; 19	NOR	SWE	CAN; 20	FRA; 23	LAT	GER	RSA; 19	44th	-10
2018	Sébastien Loeb Racing	Peugeot 208	BAR; 16	POR; 15	BEL; 15	GBR; 18	NOR; 22	SWE; 16	CAN; 14	FRA; 19	LAT; 19	USA; 15	GER; 17	RSA; 17	40th	-4
2019	Grégoire Demoustier	Peugeot 208 WRX	UAE	BAR	BEL; 19	GBR	NOR	SWE	CAN	FRA	LAT	RSA			34th	0

^{†} 10 Championship points deducted for sealing an additional turbo after scrutineering.

=== Complete TCR International Series results ===
(key) (Races in bold indicate pole position) (Races in italics indicate fastest lap)

Year	Team	Car	1	2	3	4	5	6	7	8	9	10	11	12	13	14	15	16	17	18	19	20	DC	Points
2017	DG Sport Compétition	Opel Astra TCR	RIM; 1	RIM; 2	BHR; 1	BHR; 2	SPA; 1	SPA; 2	MNZ; 1	MNZ; 2	SAL; 1; 14	SAL; 2 Ret	HUN; 1; 13	HUN; 2; 13	OSC; 1; 11	OSC; 2; 12†	CHA; 1	CHA; 2	ZHE; 1	ZHE; 2	DUB; 1	DUB; 2	NC	0

^{†} Did not finish the race, but was classified as he completed over 90% of the race distance.

=== Complete GT World Challenge Europe Sprint Cup results ===
(key) (Races in bold indicate pole position) (Races in italics indicate fastest lap)

Year	Team	Car	Class	1	2	3	4	5	6	7	8	9	10	Pos.	Points
2023	Saintéloc Junior Team	Audi R8 LMS Evo II	Pro	BRH; 1; 19	**BRH**; **2**; 18	MIS; 1; 22	MIS; 2; 18	HOC; 1; 23	HOC; 2 Ret	VAL; 1 Ret	VAL; 2 Ret	ZAN; 1 Ret	ZAN; 2; 22	22nd	1
