= Peter Kox =

Dutch racing driver (born 1964)

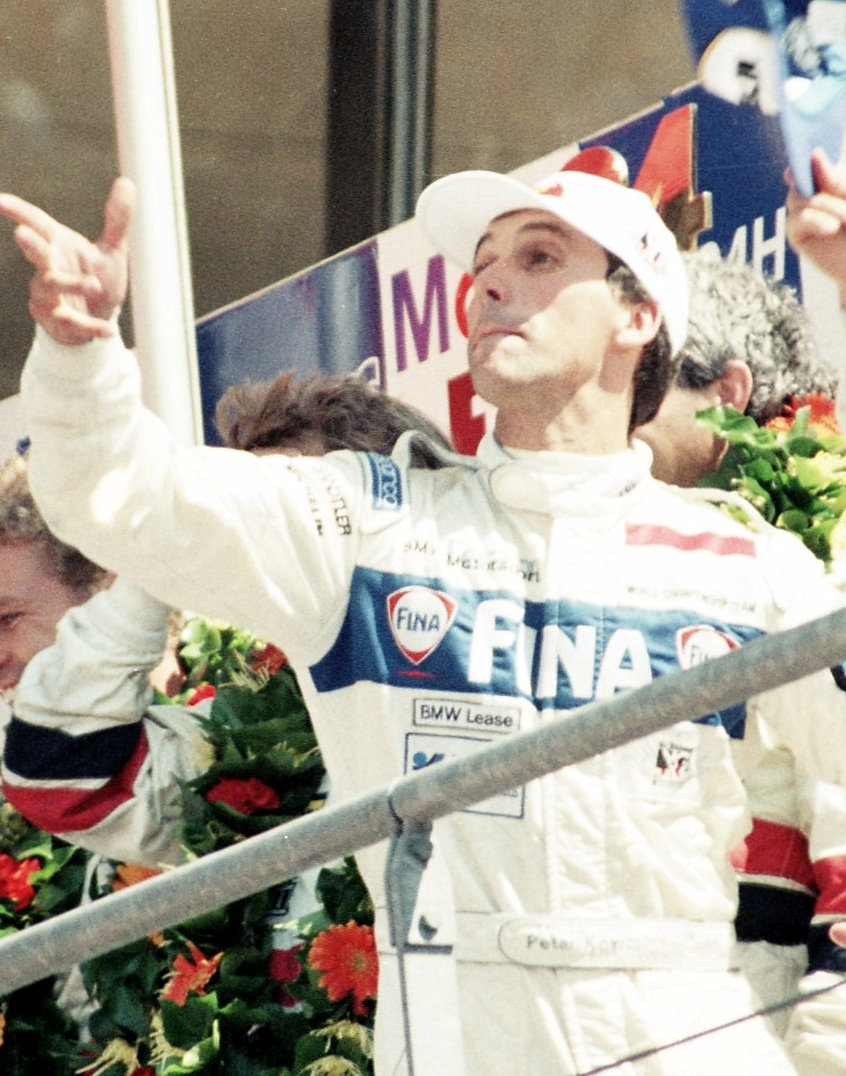
- Kox on the podium at the 1997 24 Hours of Le Mans
- Nationality: (Netherlands) Dutch
- Born: Petrus Dionysius Lambertus Theodorus Kox; 23 February 1964 (age 62) Eindhoven, Netherlands
- Categorisation: FIA Platinum (until 2013); FIA Gold (2014–2019); FIA Silver (2020–)

24 Hours of Le Mans career
- Years: 1996–1997, 1999–2000, 2002–2010
- Teams: David Price Racing, Team BMW Motorsport, Racing for Holland, Spyker Squadron, Prodrive Racing, Convers MenX Team, Aston Martin Racing, IPB Spartak Racing, Young Driver AMR
- Best finish: 3rd (1997)
- Class wins: 1 (2003)

Petrus Dionysius Lambertus Theodorus Kox, also known as Peter Kox, (born 23 February 1964) is a retired Dutch racing driver who last competed in the 2015 Blancpain Sprint Series for Reiter Engineering.

== Racing career ==
Kox began racing in karts in 1978, winning five titles until 1982. In 1983, he moved to automobiles, winning the Marlboro Formula Ford Challenge and was second and third in the Benelux and Dutch Formula Ford 2000 Championships, respectively, the following year. His single-seater racing career was interrupted several times and only took off in 1989 when he won the Benelux Formula Opel Championship in 1989.

In 1990, Kox raced in the British Formula 3 Championship where he came third with two victories. He moved up to Formula 3000 in 1991, staying there for two seasons and winning one race.

Unable to find a seat in Formula One, Kox moved to touring cars driving a BMW, winning five races in the Dutch series in 1993 on his way to the championship title. In 1995, he became a works BMW driver in the German Supertouring Championship, coming second in the series, and also winning the Spa 24 Hours. In 1996, he joined BMW Motorsport, making a handful of British Touring Car Championship appearances but focusing his efforts on the development program for the McLaren F1 GTR, winning a race in the BPR Global GT Series. The following year he drove the car in the FIA GT Championship, winning once more. He also took a class win in the Spa 24 Hours with a Diesel-powered BMW.

From 1998 to 2000, Kox returned to touring cars, becoming a Honda works driver. He raced full-time in the BTCC in 1998 and 1999 (coming 7th overall in 1999), before taking second place in the Euro STC in 2000. The following year, he joined the Carly Motors squad in a BMW and also took a win in a one-off race in the FIA GT Championship, with the Prodrive Ferrari 550 Maranello.

Kox continued with Prodrive for the following seasons, winning the GTS class in the Laguna Seca ALMS race in 2002 and the 2003 24 Hours of Le Mans. In 2004 and 2005, he raced for several different teams, including Prodrive (in the Ferrari and Aston Martin DBR9) and Reiter Engineering (in the Lamborghini Murcielago). In 2006, he split his time between the MenX team, Aston Martin and Spyker, in FIA GT, Le Mans, Le Mans Series and ALMS.

In 2007 and 2008, Kox was a works driver for Lamborghini, driving in the FIA GT Championship and ADAC GT Masters. He took part in the 24 Hours of Le Mans in 2007 with the works Aston Martin and 2008 with IPB Spartak Lamborghini. He did win the Sepang 12 Hours in 2010 for Arrows Racing in a Lamborghini LP560.

Kox was a development driver for the Acura NSX GT3 in 2016, and would drive it in the 2017 Pirelli World Challenge for RealTime Racing.

== Personal life ==
Kox's daughter, Stéphane, is also a racing driver.

== Racing record ==
=== Complete International Formula 3000 results ===
(key) (Races in bold indicate pole position; races in italics indicate fastest lap.)

Year	Entrant	Chassis	Engine	1	2	3	4	5	6	7	8	9	10	11	Pos.	Pts
1988	Tamchester Racing	Reynard 88D	Cosworth	JER	VAL	PAU	SIL	MNZ	PER	BRH	BIR	BUG	ZOL; 7	DIJ	NC	0

=== 24 Hours of Le Mans results ===
Year	Team	Co-drivers	Car	Class	Laps	Pos.	Class pos.
1996	(United Kingdom) West Competition (United Kingdom) David Price Racing	(Denmark) John Nielsen (Germany) Thomas Bscher	McLaren F1 GTR	GT1	338	4th	**3rd**
1997	(Germany) Team BMW Motorsport (Germany) BMW Team Schnitzer	(Italy) Roberto Ravaglia (France) Éric Hélary	McLaren F1 GTR	GT1	358	**3rd**	**2nd**
1999	(Germany) Konrad Motorsport (Netherlands) Talkline Racing for Holland	(Netherlands) Jan Lammers (Netherlands) Tom Coronel	Lola B98/10-Ford	LMP	213	DNF	DNF
2000	(Germany) Konrad Motorsport (Netherlands) Racing for Holland	(Netherlands) Jan Lammers (Netherlands) Tom Coronel	Lola B2K/10-Ford	LMP900	38	DNF	DNF
2002	(Netherlands) Spyker Automobielen	(Germany) Norman Simon (Netherlands) Hans Hugenholtz	Spyker C8 Double-12R	GT	142	DNF	DNF
2003	(United Kingdom) Veloqx Prodrive Racing	(Czech Republic) Tomáš Enge (United Kingdom) Jamie Davies	Ferrari 550-GTS Maranello	GTS	336	10th	**1st**
2004	(United Kingdom) Prodrive Racing	(Switzerland) Alain Menu (Czech Republic) Tomáš Enge	Ferrari 550-GTS Maranello	GTS	325	11th	4th
2005	(United Kingdom) Aston Martin Racing	(Portugal) Pedro Lamy (Czech Republic) Tomáš Enge	Aston Martin DBR9	GT1	327	DNF	DNF
2006	(Russia) Convers MenX Team	(Russia) Alexey Vasilyev (Czech Republic) Robert Pergl	Ferrari 550-GTS Maranello	GT1	196	DNF	DNF
2007	(United Kingdom) Aston Martin Racing	(United Kingdom) Johnny Herbert (Czech Republic) Tomáš Enge	Aston Martin DBR9	GT1	337	9th	4th
2008	(Russia) IPB Spartak Racing (Germany) Reiter Engineering	(Netherlands) Mike Hezemans (Russia) Roman Rusinov	Lamborghini Murciélago R-GT	GT1	266	NC	NC
2009	(United Kingdom) Aston Martin Racing	(United Kingdom) Stuart Hall (Switzerland) Harold Primat	Lola-Aston Martin B09/60	LMP1	252	DNF	DNF
2010	(Germany) Young Driver AMR	(Czech Republic) Tomáš Enge (Denmark) Christoffer Nygaard	Aston Martin DBR9	GT1	311	22nd	**3rd**

=== Complete Super Tourenwagen Cup results ===
(key) (Races in bold indicate pole position) (Races in italics indicate fastest lap)

Year	Team	Car	1	2	3	4	5	6	7	8	9	10	11	12	13	14	15	16	Pos.	Pts
1995	BMW Team Schnitzer	BMW 318is	ZOL; 1; 12	ZOL; 2; 4	SPA; 1; 7	SPA; 2; 5	ÖST; 1; 5	ÖST; 2; 2	HOC; 1; 5	HOC; 2; 6	NÜR; 1; 13	NÜR; 2; 12	SAL; 1; 2	SAL; 2; 2	AVU; 1; 3	AVU; 2; 2	NÜR; 1; 2	NÜR; 2; 3	2nd	397

=== Complete Japanese Touring Car Championship results ===
(key) (Races in bold indicate pole position) (Races in italics indicate fastest lap)

Year	Team	Car	1	2	3	4	5	6	7	8	9	10	11	12	13	14	15	16	Pos.	Pts
1995	BMW Team Schnitzer	BMW 318i	FUJ; 1	FUJ; 2	SUG; 1	SUG; 2	TOK; 1	TOK; 2	SUZ; 1	SUZ; 2	MIN; 1	MIN; 2	AID; 1	AID; 2	SEN; 1	SEN; 2	FUJ; 1; 8	FUJ; 2 Ret	24th	3

=== Complete British Touring Car Championship results ===
(key) (Races in bold indicate pole position – 1 point awarded all races) (Races in italics indicate fastest lap) (* signifies that driver lead feature race for at least one lap – 1 point given 1998 onwards)

Year	Team	Car	Class	1	2	3	4	5	6	7	8	9	10	11	12	13	14	15	16	17	18	19	20	21	22	23	24	25	26	Pos	Pts
1996	BMW Team Schnitzer	BMW 320i		DON; 1	DON; 2	BRH; 1	BRH; 2	THR; 1	THR; 2	SIL; 1	SIL; 2	OUL; 1	OUL; 2	SNE; 1	SNE; 2	BRH; 1	BRH; 2	SIL; 1	SIL; 2	KNO; 1	KNO; 2	OUL; 1	OUL; 2	THR; 1; 7	THR; 2; 10	DON; 1; 12	DON; 2; 7	BRH; 1; 2	BRH; 2; 6	14th	26
1998	Team Honda Sport	Honda Accord		THR; 1; 10	THR; 2; 7	SIL; 1 Ret	SIL; 2; 11	DON; 1; 7	DON; 2 Ret	BRH; 1; 14	BRH; 2; 7	OUL; 1 Ret	OUL; 2 Ret	DON; 1; 4	DON; 2 Ret	CRO; 1; 7	CRO; 2 Ret	SNE; 1; 16	SNE; 2 Ret	THR; 1; 13	THR; 2; 7	KNO; 1; 7	KNO; 2; 14	BRH; 1; 6	BRH; 2; 7*	OUL; 1; 7	OUL; 2 Ret	SIL; 1 Ret	SIL; 2; 7*	12th	52
1999	Team Honda Sport	Honda Accord		DON; 1; 9	DON; 2; 7	SIL; 1; 9	SIL; 2; 5	THR; 1; 6	THR; 2; 5	BRH; 1 Ret	BRH; 2; 4	OUL; 1; 9	OUL; 2; 7	DON; 1; 7	DON; 2 Ret	CRO; 1; 3	CRO; 2; 9	SNE; 1; 6	SNE; 2; 1*	THR; 1; 9	THR; 2; 9	KNO; 1 Ret	KNO; 2; 2	BRH; 1; 9	BRH; 2; 4*	OUL; 1; 5	OUL; 2 Ret	SIL; 1; 7	SIL; 2 Ret	7th	113
2000	Redstone Team Honda	Honda Accord	S	BRH; 1	BRH; 2	DON; 1 Ret	DON; 2 ovr:9 cls:9	THR; 1	THR; 2	KNO; 1	KNO; 2	OUL; 1	OUL; 2	SIL; 1	SIL; 2	CRO; 1	CRO; 2	SNE; 1	SNE; 2	DON; 1	DON; 2	BRH; 1	BRH; 2	OUL; 1	OUL; 2	SIL; 1	SIL; 2			13th	2

=== Complete European Touring Car Championship results ===
(key) (Races in bold indicate pole position) (Races in italics indicate fastest lap)

Year	Team	Car	1	2	3	4	5	6	7	8	9	10	11	12	13	14	15	16	17	18	19	20	DC	Pts
2000	JAS Engineering	Honda Accord	**MUG**; **1**; 1	**MUG**; **2**; 1	PER; 1; 2	PER; 2; 13	**A1R**; **1**; 1	**A1R**; **2**; 13	**MNZ**; **1**; 2	MNZ; 2; 1	HUN; 1; 4	HUN; 2; 4	**IMO**; **1**; 3	IMO; 2; 3	**MIS**; **1**; 2	MIS; 2; 3	**BRN**; **1**; 1	**BRN**; **2**; 9	**VAL**; **1**; 3	VAL; 2; 3	MOB; 1; 9	MOB; 2; 8	2nd	232
2002	Carly Motors Team Isert	BMW 320i	MAG; 1; 8	MAG; 2 Ret	SIL; 1 Ret	SIL; 2 DNS	BRN; 1; 8	BRN; 2 Ret	JAR; 1; 7	JAR; 2; 6	AND; 1; 8	AND; 2; 8	OSC; 1	OSC; 2	SPA; 1	SPA; 2	PER; 1	PER; 2	DON; 1	DON; 2	EST; 1	EST; 2	17th	1

=== Complete European Super Production Championship results ===
(key) (Races in bold indicate pole position) (Races in italics indicate fastest lap)

Year	Team	Car	1	2	3	4	5	6	7	8	9	10	DC	Pts
2001	Ravaglia Motorsport	BMW 320i	MNZ; 1	**BRN**; 1	MAG; Ret	**SIL**; 1	**ZOL**; 2	HUN; 2	A1R; 9	NÜR; 2	JAR; 4	EST; DSQ	1st	117

=== V8 Supercar results ===
Year	Team	Car	1	2	3	4	5	6	7	8	9	10	11	12	13	14	15	16	17	18	19	20	21	22	23	24	25	26	27	28	29	30	31	DC	Pts
2012	Dick Johnson Racing	Ford FG Falcon	ADE; R1	ADE; R2	SYM; R3	SYM; R4	HAM; R5	HAM; R6	PER; R7	PER; R8	PER; R9	PHI; R10	PHI; R11	HDV; R12	HDV; R13	TOW; R14	TOW; R15	QLD; R16	QLD; R17	SMP; R18	SMP; R19	SAN; Q	SAN; R20	BAT; R21	SUR; R22; Ret	SUR; R23; Ret	YMC; R24	YMC; R25	YMC; R26	WIN; R27	WIN; R28	SYD; R29	SYD; R30	NC	0 †

† Not Eligible for points

=== FIA GT competition results ===
==== Complete FIA GT Championship results ====
(key) (Races in bold indicate pole position; races in italics indicate fastest lap.)

Year	Team	Car	Class	1	2	3	4	5	6	7	8	9	10	11	Pos.	Pts
1997	Team BMW Motorsport	McLaren F1 GTR	GT1	HOC; Ret	SIL; 1	HEL; 11	NÜR; 4	SPA; 4	A1R; Ret	SUZ; 8	DON; 5	MUG; 5	SEB; 2	LAG; Ret	8th	26
2000	Carsport Holland	Chrysler Viper GTS-R	GT	VAL	EST	MNZ	SIL	HUN	ZOL	A1R	LAU	BRN	MAG; Ret		NC	0
2001	Prodrive All-Stars	Ferrari 550-GTS Maranello	GT	MNZ	BRN	MAG	SIL	ZOL	HUN	SPA	**A1R**; 1	**NÜR**; 3	JAR		13th	16
2001	Reiter Engineering	Lamborghini Diablo GT	GT											EST; 5	13th	16
2002	BMS Scuderia Italia	Ferrari 550-GTS Maranello	GT	MAG	SIL	BRN	JAR	AND	OSC	SPA; Ret	PER	DON	EST		NC	0
2004	Reiter Engineering	Lamborghini Murciélago R-GT	GT	MNZ	VAL; 3	MAG	HOC	BRN	DON	SPA	IMO	OSC	DUB	ZHU	38th	6
2005	Reiter Engineering	Lamborghini Murciélago R-GT	GT1	MNZ; Ret	MAG; 13			BRN; Ret		OSC; 8					59th	1
2005	Aston Martin Racing^{†}	Aston Martin DBR9	GT1			SIL; 1	IMO		SPA; 5						59th	1
2005	MenX	Ferrari 550-GTS Maranello	GT1								IST; 10	ZHU	DUB	BHR	59th	1
2006	B-Racing RS Line Team	Lamborghini Murciélago R-GT	GT1	SIL	BRN; 6	OSC									26th	12
2006	Aston Martin Racing BMS	Aston Martin DBR9	GT1				SPA; 4	PRI	DIJ	MUG					26th	12
2006	All-Inkl.com Racing	Lamborghini Murciélago R-GT	GT1								HUN; 8	ADR; Ret	DUB		26th	12
2006	Spyker Squadron b.v.	Spyker C8 Spyder GT2-R	GT2	SIL	BRN	OSC	SPA	PRI	DIJ	MUG	HUN	ADR	DUB; Ret		NC	0
2007	All-Inkl.com Racing	Lamborghini Murciélago R-GT	GT1	ZHU; 11	SIL; Ret	BUC; Ret	MNZ; 10	OSC; 5							24th	11
2007	Reiter Lamborghini	Lamborghini Murciélago R-GT	GT1						SPA; Ret	ADR; 6	BRN; 8	NOG	ZOL; 6		24th	11
2008	IPB Spartak Racing	Lamborghini Murciélago R-GT	GT1	SIL; 10	MNZ; Ret	ADR	OSC	SPA; 8	BUC; 8	BUC; 7	BRN	NOG	ZOL	SAN	27th	9.5
2009	CRS Racing	Ferrari F430 GT2	GT2	SIL	ADR	OSC	SPA; 2	BUC	ALG	PRI	ZOL				22nd	8

^{†} Not eligible for points

==== Complete GT1 World Championship results ====
(key) (Races in bold indicate pole position; races in italics indicate fastest lap.)

Year	Team	Car	1	2	3	4	5	6	7	8	9	10	11	12	13	14	15	16	17	18	19	20	Pos.	Pts
2010	Reiter	Lamborghini	ABU; QR; 15	ABU; CR; 8	SIL; QR; 10	SIL; CR; Ret	BRN; QR; DNS	BRN; CR; DNS	PRI; QR; 2	PRI; CR; 18	SPA; QR; 7	SPA; CR; Ret	NÜR; QR; 3	NÜR; CR; 2	ALG; QR; 12	ALG; CR; 7	NAV; QR; 17	NAV; CR; Ret	INT; QR; 9	INT; CR; 12	SAN; QR; Ret	SAN; CR; 10	18th	39
2011	Swiss Racing Team	Lamborghini	ABU; QR; 10	ABU; CR; 7	ZOL; QR; 4	ZOL; CR; 4	ALG; QR; 10	ALG; CR; 5	SAC; QR; 12	SAC; CR; Ret	SIL; QR	SIL; CR	NAV; QR	NAV; CR	PRI; QR	PRI; CR	ORD; QR	ORD; CR	BEI; QR	BEI; CR	SAN; QR	SAN; CR	16th	31
2012	Reiter Engineering	Lamborghini	NOG; QR; 8	NOG; CR; 7	ZOL; QR; 8	ZOL; CR; 13	NAV; QR; 4	NAV; QR; 7	SVK; QR	SVK; CR	ALG; QR; Ret	ALG; CR; 4	SVK; QR; 6	SVK; CR; 7	MOS; QR	MOS; CR	NÜR; QR; 1	NÜR; CR; 3	DON; QR; 4	DON; CR; 2			10th	78

==== Complete FIA GT Series results ====
(key) (Races in bold indicate pole position; races in italics indicate fastest lap.)

Year	Team	Car	Class	1	2	3	4	5	6	7	8	9	10	11	12	Pos.	Pts
2013	Lamborghini Blancpain Reiter	Lamborghini Gallardo LP560-4	Pro	NOG; QR	NOG; CR	**ZOL**; **QR**; 2	ZOL; CR; 1	ZAN; QR	ZAN; CR	SVK; QR; 3	SVK; CR; Ret	NAV; QR	NAV; CR	BAK; QR	BAK; CR	12th	36

==== Complete Blancpain Sprint Series results ====
(key) (Races in bold indicate pole position; races in italics indicate fastest lap.)

Year	Team	Car	Class	1	2	3	4	5	6	7	8	9	10	11	12	13	14	Pos.	Pts
2014	Blancpain Racing	Lamborghini Gallardo FL2	Pro	NOG; QR; 12	NOG; CR; Ret	BRH; QR	BRH; CR											20th	12
2014	Reiter Engineering	Lamborghini Gallardo FL2	Pro					ZAN; QR; 16	ZAN; CR; 7	SVK; QR	SVK; CR	ALG; QR	ALG; CR					20th	12
2014	NSC Motorsports	Lamborghini Gallardo FL2	Pro											ZOL; QR; 2	ZOL; CR; Ret	BAK; QR	BAK; CR	20th	12
2015	Reiter Engineering	Lamborghini Gallardo LP 560-4 R-EX	Pro	NOG; QR	NOG; CR	BRH; QR	BRH; CR	ZOL; QR; 11	ZOL; CR; 8	MOS; QR	MOS; CR	ALG; QR	ALG; CR	MIS; QR	MIS; CR	ZAN; QR	ZAN; CR	24th	4

Sporting positions
Preceded by Christian Abt	ADAC GT Masters Champion; 2010 with: Albert von Thurn und Taxis	Succeeded by Dino Lunardi; Alexandros Margaritis
