= Francesco Castellacci =

Italian-Monégasque racing driver

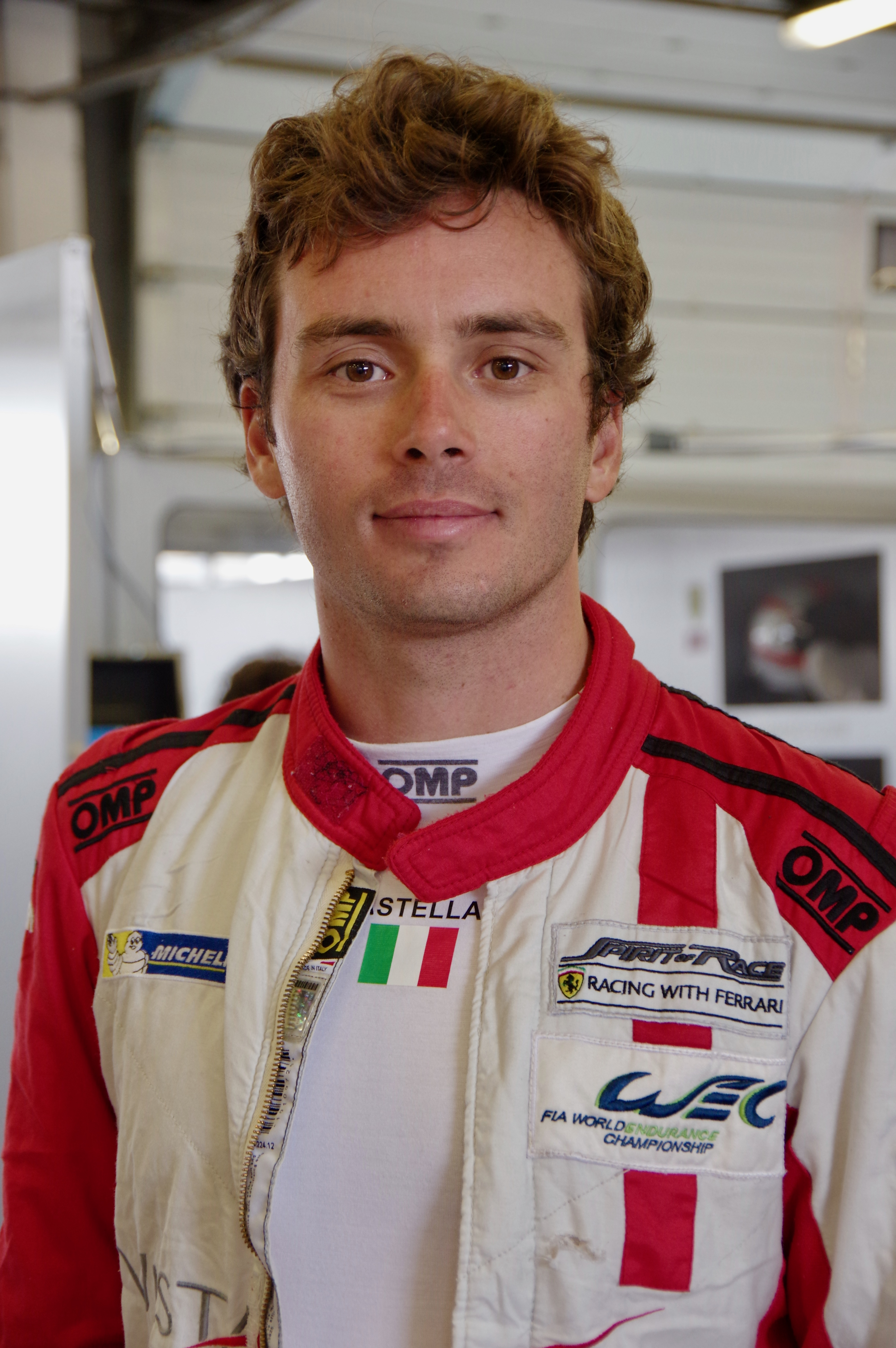
- Castellacci in 2019
- Nationality: (Italy) Italian (Monaco) Monégasque (Note: Castellacci, a dual citizen, competed under an Italian racing licence earlier in his career. Since 2026, he represents Monaco.)
- Born: Francesco Castellacci de Villanova; 4 April 1987 (age 39) Rome, Italy

FIA GT1 World Championship career
- Debut season: 2012
- Current team: AF Corse
- Categorisation: FIA Silver (until 2011, 2014–); FIA Gold (2012–2013)
- Starts: 18
- Wins: 0
- Poles: 0
- Fastest laps: 0
- Best finish: 14th in 2012

Previous series
- 2011 2008–09–10 2007 2005–06: FIA GT3 European Championship; Italian Formula Three; British Formula 3 Formula Azzurra

Championship titles
- 2011: FIA GT3 European Championship

Francesco Castellacci de Villanova (born 4 April 1987 in Rome) is an Italian and Monégasque professional racing driver competing in the FIA World Endurance Championship for Vista AF Corse.

Francesco studied at Marymount International School and Università Bocconi before starting his career as a racing driver. Together with Federico Leo, he won the drivers' title of the 2011 FIA GT3 European Championship, driving a Ferrari 458 Italia GT3.

== Career ==
=== Formula Azzurra ===
Castellacci began his single-seater career in late 2005, racing in the Formula Azzurra Winter Trophy. In the series' four races, all held at Adria International Raceway, he achieved two podium places to be classified in third place. In 2006, he entered the full Formula Azzurra championship, scoring 24 points to finish eighth in the final standings.

=== Formula Three ===
In late 2006, Castellacci tested a Formula Three car for the first time, driving for the British team Hitech Racing at Rockingham Motor Speedway. In 2007, he took part in the full British Formula 3 Championship season, racing alongside Australian driver John Martin at Alan Docking Racing. Castellacci failed to score a point in the 22 races he competed in, with his best result coming in the first race at Donington Park, where he finished in fifteenth position. He also took part in the Masters of Formula 3 race held at Zolder, finishing in 26th place.

The following year, Castellacci returned to his native Italy to compete in the Italian Formula Three Championship for Lucidi Motors. He finished the season fourth overall, taking six podium places along with a double pole position at the Monza round. The title was won by his team-mate Mirko Bortolotti.

Castellacci continued in the series for 2009, switching teams to join Prema Powerteam. He finished in the points on eleven occasions and took a single podium position at Misano to be classified in eighth place overall. During the year, he once again took part in the Masters of Formula Three event, this time racing for Manor Motorsport. He finished the race in 30th place.

=== Porsche Supercup ===
In June 2010, Castellacci made his debut in the Porsche Supercup round at the Valencia Street Circuit, finishing in 17th position. He is also due to contest the rounds at Silverstone, Hungaroring and Monza later in the season.

A month earlier, Castellacci also made his debut in the Porsche Carrera Cup Germany at Valencia's Circuit Ricardo Tormo, finishing in 14th place.

=== Other Series ===
In October 2009, Castellacci sampled a GP2 car for the first time during the first post-season test at Jerez. Driving for the Italian Durango team, he completed 107 laps during the course of the three-day test, recording a best time of 1:27.615 on the final day of running.

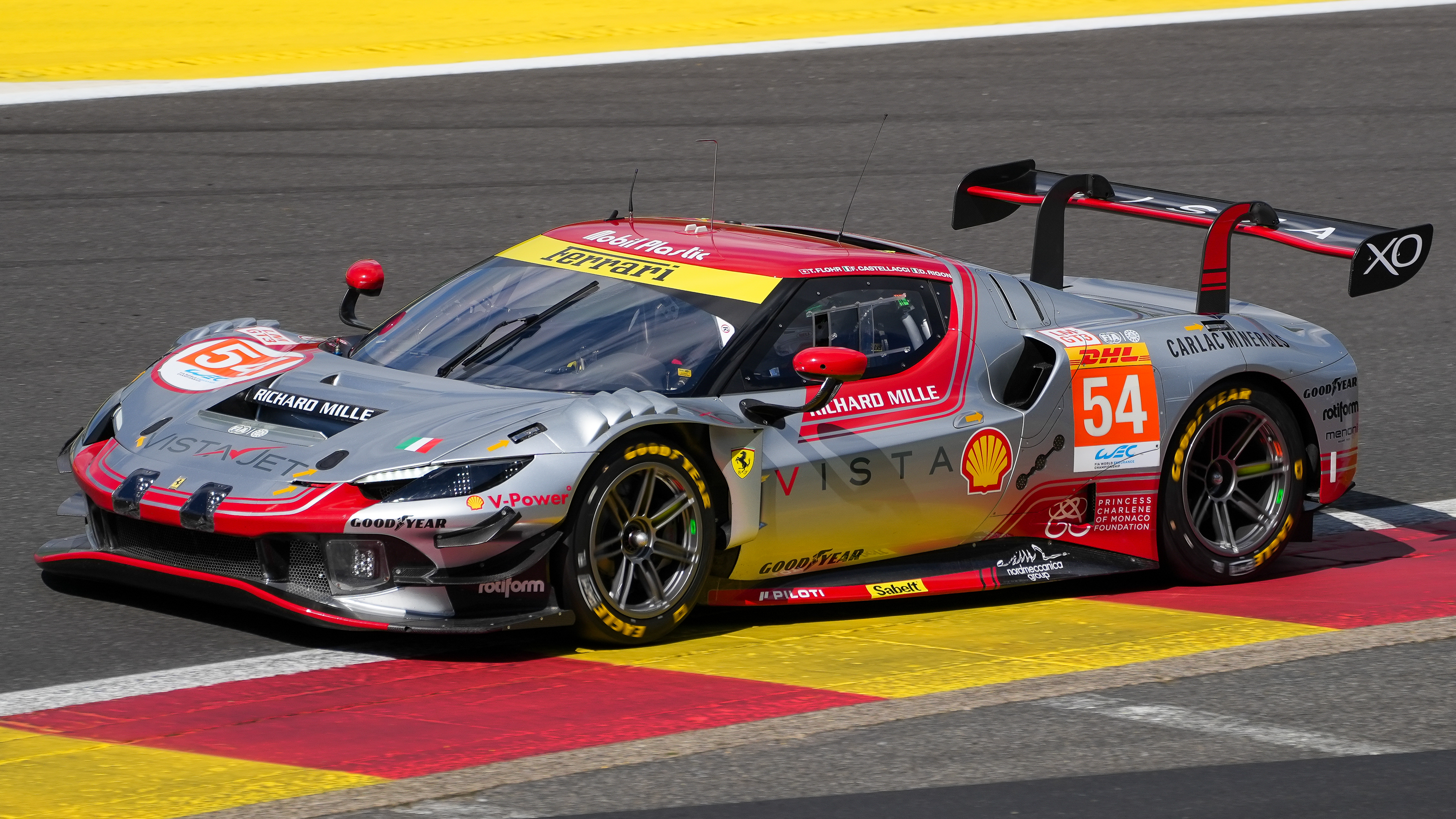
The No. 54 Vista AF Corse Ferrari 296 GT3 belonging to Castellaci at the 2024 6 Hours of Spa-Francorchamps

Castellacci also took part in Formula Renault 3.5 Series testing during October and November 2009, driving cars for Draco Racing, Interwetten.com Racing and Prema Powerteam.

For 2011, Castellacci raced in the FIA GT3 European Championship with AF Corse, sharing a Ferrari 458 with fellow Italian driver Federico Leo. The duo won the drivers' title at the final round of the season in Zandvoort.

The following year, a switch to the FIA GT1 World Championship was in order for Castellacci, who partnered Enzo Ide at AF Corse. With a best result of fifth, the duo finished 14th in the standings.

In later years, Castellacci focused on endurance racing, competing in the FIA World Endurance Championship (WEC) in the LMGTE Am class, where he finished third in the standings in 2023. Castellacci competed in 2024 at the FIA World Endurance Championship (WEC) with Vista AF Corse, driving a Ferrari 296 GT3.

== Racing record ==
=== Career summary ===
Season	Series	Team	Races	Wins	Poles	F/Laps	Podiums	Points	Position
2005	Formula Azzurra – Winter Trophy	Team Europa Corse	4	0	1	0	2	?	**3rd**
2006	Formula Azzurra	Team Federkarting	14	0	0	0	0	24	8th
2007	British Formula 3 Championship	Alan Docking Racing	22	0	0	0	0	0	22nd
2007	Masters of Formula 3	Alan Docking Racing	1	0	0	0	0	N/A	26th
2008	Italian Formula Three Championship	Lucidi Motors	16	0	2	0	6	57	4th
2009	Italian Formula Three Championship	Prema Powerteam	16	0	0	0	1	64	8th
2009	Masters of Formula 3	Manor Motorsport	1	0	0	0	0	N/A	30th
2010	Italian Formula Three Championship	RC Motorsport	12	0	0	0	0	6	18th
2010	Italian GT Championship - GT Cup	Petri Corse Motorsport	1	0	0	0	0	1	60th
2010	Porsche Carrera Cup Germany	MRS Team	1	0	0	0	0	0	NC
2010	Porsche Supercup	Schnabl Engineering Parker Racing	1	0	0	0	0	N/A†	NC†
2010	Porsche Supercup	Sanitec Giltrap Racing	2	0	0	0	0	N/A†	NC†
2011	FIA GT3 European Championship	AF Corse	12	1	3	0	4	111	**1st**
2011	24H Dubai - A6	MRS Team PZ Aschaffenburg	1	0	0	0	0	N/A	10th
2012	FIA GT1 World Championship	AF Corse	18	0	0	0	0	42	14th
2013	Blancpain Endurance Series - Pro	Vita4One Team Italy	2	0	0	0	0	0	NC
2013	Blancpain Endurance Series - Pro	Kessel Racing	1	0	0	0	0	0	NC
2013	Blancpain Endurance Series - Pro	Belgian Audi Club WRT	1	0	0	0	0	0	NC
2013	Blancpain Endurance Series - Pro-Am	Black Falcon	1	0	0	0	0	0	NC
2013	Winter Series by GT Sport - GTS	Kessel Racing	4	0	0	1	1	?	?
2013	Spanish GT Championship - GTS	Kessel Racing	3	0	0	0	0	0	NC
2013	International GT Open - GTS	Kessel Racing	4	0	0	0	0	0	NC
2013	Gulf 12 Hours - GT3 Pro-Am	Kessel Racing	1	0	0	0	0	N/A	12th
2014	Blancpain Endurance Series - Pro-Am Cup	Scuderia Villorba Corse	4	0	0	0	2	81	**2nd**
2014	Blancpain Endurance Series - Pro-Am Cup	AF Corse	1	0	0	0	0	81	**2nd**
2014	European Le Mans Series - GTC	AF Corse	2	0	0	1	0	14	16th
2014	International GT Open - GTS	AF Corse	5	0	0	0	0	3	31st
2014	Gulf 12 Hours - GT3	AF Corse	1	0	0	0	0	N/A	7th
2014	Challenge Endurance GT/Tourisme V de V	Raceworks Motorsport	1	0	0	0	0	0	NC
2015	FIA World Endurance Championship - LMGTE Am	Aston Martin Racing	8	0	0	0	0	54	9th
2015	24 Hours of Le Mans - LMGTE Am	Aston Martin Racing	1	0	0	0	0	N/A	DNF
2015	European Le Mans Series - GTC	AF Corse	5	2	1	1	3	81	**2nd**
2016	Michelin GT3 Le Mans Cup	AF Corse	6	0	0	1	0	34	7th
2016	International GT Open - Pro-Am	AF Corse	2	0	0	1	0	6	23rd
2016	Gulf 12 Hours - Pro-Am	AF Corse	1	1	1	0	1	N/A	**1st**
2016	24H Series - SP3	JR Motorsport	1	0	0	0	0	0	NC†
2016	Touring Car Endurance Series - SP3	JR Motorsport							
2017	FIA World Endurance Championship - LMGTE Am	Spirit of Race	9	1	0	1	4	109	4th
2017	24 Hours of Le Mans - LMGTE Am	Spirit of Race	1	0	0	0	0	N/A	12th
2017	Blancpain GT Series Endurance Cup - Pro-Am	AF Corse	1	0	0	0	0	16	25th
2017	Intercontinental GT Challenge	AF Corse	1	0	0	0	0	0	NC
2018	European Le Mans Series - GTE	Spirit of Race	1	0	0	0	0	8	14th
2018	24 Hours of Le Mans - LMGTE Am	Spirit of Race	1	0	0	0	1	N/A	**2nd**
2018–19	FIA World Endurance Championship - LMGTE Am	Spirit of Race	8	0	0	0	2	99	4th
2019	24 Hours of Le Mans - LMGTE Am	Spirit of Race	1	0	0	0	0	N/A	12th
2019–20	FIA World Endurance Championship - LMGTE Am	AF Corse	7	0	0	0	0	71	12th
2020	European Le Mans Series - GTE	AF Corse	1	0	0	0	0	0	NC
2020	24 Hours of Le Mans - LMGTE Am	AF Corse	1	0	0	0	0	N/A	13th
2021	Asian Le Mans Series - GT	AF Corse	4	0	0	0	0	1.5	16th
2021	FIA World Endurance Championship - LMGTE Am	AF Corse	6	0	0	0	1	71	6th
2021	24 Hours of Le Mans - LMGTE Am	AF Corse	1	0	0	0	0	N/A	11th
2022	FIA World Endurance Championship - LMGTE Am	AF Corse	6	0	0	0	0	58	8th
2022	24 Hours of Le Mans - LMGTE Am	AF Corse	1	0	0	0	0	N/A	6th
2023	FIA World Endurance Championship - LMGTE Am	AF Corse	7	1	0	0	1	91	**3rd**
2023	24 Hours of Le Mans - LMGTE Am	AF Corse	1	0	0	0	0	N/A	5th
2023	IMSA SportsCar Championship - GTD	AF Corse	2	0	0	0	0	337	47th
2024	FIA World Endurance Championship - LMGT3	Vista AF Corse	8	1	0	0	1	57	7th
2024	24 Hours of Le Mans - LMGT3	Vista AF Corse	1	0	0	0	0	N/A	DNF
2025	FIA World Endurance Championship - LMGT3	Vista AF Corse	4	0	0	0	1	31*	8th*
2025	24 Hours of Le Mans - LMGT3	Vista AF Corse	1	0	0	0	0	N/A	DNF
2025	British GT Championship - GT3	Spirit of Race	1	0	0	0	0	0	NC†
2025	Italian GT Championship Endurance Cup - GT3	AF Corse	3	0	0	0	0	14	13th
2025–26	Asian Le Mans Series - GT	Vista AF Corse	6	0	0	0	0	24	14th
2026	European Le Mans Series - LMGT3	Richard Mille AF Corse	1	0	0	0	0	10	27th
2026	FIA World Endurance Championship - LMGT3	Vista AF Corse							

† - As Castellacci is a guest driver, he is ineligible to score points.

=== Complete British Formula Three Championship results ===
(key) (Races in bold indicate pole position; races in italics indicate fastest lap)

Year	Entrant	Chassis	Engine	1	2	3	4	5	6	7	8	9	10	11	12	13	14	15	16	17	18	19	20	21	22	DC	Points
2007	Alan Docking Racing	Dallara F307	Mugen-Honda	OUL; 1 Ret	OUL; 2; 20	DON; 1; 22	DON; 2 Ret	BUC; 1 Ret	BUC; 2 Ret	SNE; 1 Ret	SNE; 2; 22	MNZ; 1; 22	MNZ; 2 Ret	BRH; 1; 26	BRH; 2 Ret	SPA; 1; 22	SPA; 2; 21	SIL; 1; 19	SIL; 2; 24	THR; 1; 21	THR; 2 Ret	CRO; 1 Ret	CRO; 2; 18	ROC; 1; 21	ROC; 2; 20	22nd	0

=== Complete Italian Formula Three Championship results ===
(key) (Races in bold indicate pole position) (Races in italics indicate fastest lap)

Year	Team	1	2	3	4	5	6	7	8	9	10	11	12	13	14	15	16	Pos	Points
2008	Lucidi Motors	MUG1; 1; 14	MUG1; 2; 3	MAG; 1; 3	MAG; 2 Ret	**MNZ**; **1** Ret	**MNZ**; **2**; 2	MUG2; 1; 4	MUG2; 2; 3	VAR; 1; 5	VAR; 2 Ret	MIS; 1; 3	MIS; 2; 11	ADR; 1; 6	ADR; 2; 6	VAL; 1; 11	VAL; 2; 2	4th	57
2009	Prema Powerteam	ADR; 1; 7	ADR; 2; 8	MAG; 1; 4	MAG; 2; 4	MUG; 1; 6	MUG; 2; 6	MIS; 1; 3	MIS; 2; 4	VAR; 1; 8	VAR; 2; 10	IMO; 1; 13	IMO; 2; 12	VAL; 1; 7	VAL; 2; 15	MNZ; 1; 12	MNZ; 2 Ret	8th	640
2010	RC Motorsport	MIS; 1; 21	MIS; 2 Ret	HOC; 1; 19	HOC; 2; 15	IMO; 1 Ret	IMO; 2; 15	MUG1; 1	MUG1; 2	VAR; 1	VAR; 2	VAL; 1; 6	VAL; 2; 18	MUG2; 1; 13	MUG2; 2; 15	MNZ; 1; 14	MNZ; 2; 13	18th	6

=== Complete GT1 World Championship results ===
Year	Team	Car	1	2	3	4	5	6	7	8	9	10	11	12	13	14	15	16	17	18	Pos	Pts	Ref
2012	AF Corse	Ferrari	NOG; QR; 10	NOG; CR; 5	ZOL; QR; 7	ZOL; CR; 11	NAV; QR; 13	NAV; QR; 11	SVK; QR; 12	SVK; CR; 9	ALG; QR; 11	ALG; CR; 7	SVK; QR; 10	SVK; CR; Ret	MOS; QR; 8	MOS; CR; 6	NÜR; QR; 10	NÜR; CR; 7	DON; QR; 7	DON; CR; 5	14th	42	

=== Complete European Le Mans Series results ===
Year	Entrant	Class	Car	Engine	1	2	3	4	5	6	Pos	Points
2014	AF Corse	GTC	Ferrari 458 Italia GT3	Ferrari F136 4.5 L V8	SIL	IMO; 7	RBR	LEC; 6	EST		16th	14
2015	AF Corse	GTC	Ferrari 458 Italia GT3	Ferrari F136 4.5 L V8	SIL; Ret	IMO; 1	**RBR**; 1	LEC; 2	EST; 4		2nd	81
2018	Spirit of Race	LMGTE	Ferrari 488 GTE	Ferrari F154CB 3.9 L Turbo V8	LEC; 6	MNZ	RBR	SIL	SPA	ALG	14th	8
2020	AF Corse	LMGTE	Ferrari 488 GTE Evo	Ferrari F154CB 3.9 L Turbo V8	LEC	SPA; Ret	LEC	MNZ	ALG		NC	0
2026	Richard Mille AF Corse	LMGT3	Ferrari 296 GT3 Evo	Ferrari F163CE 3.0 L Turbo V6	CAT; 5	LEC	IMO	SPA	SIL	ALG	27th	10

=== Complete FIA World Endurance Championship results ===
Year	Entrant	Class	Car	Engine	1	2	3	4	5	6	7	8	9	Rank	Points
2015	Aston Martin Racing	LMGTE Am	Aston Martin Vantage GTE	Aston Martin 4.5 L V8	SIL; 4	SPA; 6	LMS; Ret	NÜR; 7	COA; 6	FUJ; 7	SHA; 6	BHR; 7		9th	54
2017	Spirit of Race	LMGTE Am	Ferrari 488 GTE	Ferrari F154CB 3.9 L Turbo V8	SIL; Ret	SPA; 4	LMS; 7	NÜR; 2	MEX; 4	COA; 3	FUJ; 1	SHA; Ret	BHR; 3	4th	109
2018–19	Spirit of Race	LMGTE Am	Ferrari 488 GTE	Ferrari F154CB 3.9 L Turbo V8	SPA; 8	LMS; 2	SIL; 9	FUJ; 6	SHA; 4	SEB; 2	SPA; 4	LMS; 7		4th	99
2019–20	AF Corse	LMGTE Am	Ferrari 488 GTE Evo	Ferrari F154CB 3.9 L Turbo V8	SIL; 9	FUJ; 6	SHA; 8	BHR; 5	COA; 7	SPA; 7	LMS; 4			12th	71
2021	AF Corse	LMGTE Am	Ferrari 488 GTE Evo	Ferrari F154CB 3.9 L Turbo V8	SPA; 4	ALG; 3	MNZ; 7	LMS; 7	BHR; 7	BHR; 6				6th	71
2022	AF Corse	LMGTE Am	Ferrari 488 GTE Evo	Ferrari F154CB 3.9 L Turbo V8	SEB; 9	SPA; 4	LMS; 5	MNZ; 9	FUJ; 4	BHR; 7				8th	58
2023	AF Corse	LMGTE Am	Ferrari 488 GTE Evo	Ferrari F154CB 3.9 L Turbo V8	SEB; 5	PRT; 4	SPA; NC	LMS; 5	MNZ; 10	FUJ; 1	BHR; 4			3rd	91
2024	Vista AF Corse	LMGT3	Ferrari 296 GT3	Ferrari F163 3.0 L Turbo V6	QAT; 5	IMO; 12	SPA; 6	LMS; Ret	SÃO; 15	COA; Ret	FUJ; 1	BHR; 7		7th	57
2025	Vista AF Corse	LMGT3	Ferrari 296 GT3	Ferrari F163 3.0 L Turbo V6	QAT; 8	IMO; 5	SPA; 3	LMS; Ret	SÃO; 11	COA; 3	FUJ; 6	BHR; Ret		7th	54
2026	Vista AF Corse	LMGT3	Ferrari 296 GT3	Ferrari F163 3.0 L Turbo V6	IMO; 11	SPA; 15	LMS; Ret	SÃO; 17	COA	FUJ	CAT	MNZ		25th*	0*

^{*} Season still in progress.

=== Complete 24 Hours of Le Mans results ===
Year	Team	Co-Drivers	Car	Class	Laps	Pos.	Class Pos.
2015	(United Kingdom) Aston Martin Racing	(Germany) Roald Goethe (United Kingdom) Stuart Hall	Aston Martin Vantage GTE	GTE; Am	187	DNF	DNF
2017	(Switzerland) Spirit of Race	(Switzerland) Thomas Flohr (Monaco) Olivier Beretta	Ferrari 488 GTE	GTE; Am	326	41st	12th
2018	(Switzerland) Spirit of Race	(Switzerland) Thomas Flohr (Italy) Giancarlo Fisichella	Ferrari 488 GTE	GTE; Am	335	26th	**2nd**
2019	(Switzerland) Spirit of Race	(Switzerland) Thomas Flohr (Italy) Giancarlo Fisichella	Ferrari 488 GTE	GTE; Am	327	43rd	12th
2020	(Italy) AF Corse	(Switzerland) Thomas Flohr (Italy) Giancarlo Fisichella	Ferrari 488 GTE Evo	GTE; Am	330	39th	13th
2021	(Italy) AF Corse	(Switzerland) Thomas Flohr (Italy) Giancarlo Fisichella	Ferrari 488 GTE Evo	GTE; Am	329	39th	11th
2022	(Italy) AF Corse	(New Zealand) Nick Cassidy (Switzerland) Thomas Flohr	Ferrari 488 GTE Evo	GTE; Am	340	39th	6th
2023	(Italy) AF Corse	(Switzerland) Thomas Flohr (Italy) Davide Rigon	Ferrari 488 GTE Evo	GTE; Am	312	31st	5th
2024	(Italy) Vista AF Corse	(Switzerland) Thomas Flohr (Italy) Davide Rigon	Ferrari 296 GT3	LMGT3	30	DNF	DNF
2025	(Italy) Vista AF Corse	(Switzerland) Thomas Flohr (Italy) Davide Rigon	Ferrari 296 GT3	LMGT3	192	DNF	DNF
2026	(Italy) Vista AF Corse	(Switzerland) Thomas Flohr (Italy) Davide Rigon	Ferrari 296 GT3 Evo	LMGT3	110	DNF	DNF

=== Complete Asian Le Mans Series results ===
Year	Team	Class	Car	Engine	1	2	3	4	5	6	Pos.	Points
2021	AF Corse	GT	Ferrari 488 GT3	Ferrari F154CB 3.9 L Turbo V8	DUB; 1; 11	DUB; 2; 12	ABU; 1; 11	ABU; 2 Ret			16th	1.5
2025–26	Vista AF Corse	GT	Ferrari 296 GT3	Ferrari F163CE 3.0 L Turbo V6	SEP; 1; 11	SEP; 2; 5	DUB; 1; 5	DUB; 2; 8	ABU; 1; 16	ABU; 2; 14	14th	24

== Notes ==
Sporting positions
Preceded by Christian Hohenadel; Daniel Keilwitz	FIA GT3 European Champion; 2011 with: Federico Leo	Succeeded by Dominik Baumann; Maximilian Bühk
