= Fritz von Thurn und Taxis =

Austrian journalist (born 1950)

Friedrich von Thurn und Taxis
- Born: 22 June 1950 (age 76); Linz, Upper Austria, Allied-occupied Austria
- Spouse: Beata von Béry (m. 1977)
Names
- German: Friedrich Leonhard Ignatius Josef Maria Lamoral Balthasar
- House: Thurn and Taxis
- Father: Prince Johann von Nepomuk von Thurn und Taxis
- Mother: Princess Maria Julia von Lobkowicz

Fritz von Thurn und Taxis (born Friedrich Leonhard Ignatius Josef Maria Lamoral Balthasar Thurn und Taxis) is an Austrian journalist and a member of the Bohemian line of the House of Thurn and Taxis.

He became well known as a longtime sportscaster on the Bayerisches Fernsehen television channel.

Since 1993, Thurn und Taxis has been a football commentator on the pay television channel Sky Deutschland.

== Life and career ==
Thurn und Taxis was the third child and second son of Prince Johann von Nepomuk von Thurn und Taxis and his wife, Princess Maria Julia von Lobkowicz.

His journalistic career began in 1971 with the Bayerischen Rundfunk. There, Thurn und Taxis worked in both television and in radio programs as a sports reporter and commentator and reported on several Olympic Games, football, skiing, and Ice Hockey World Championships events.

In honor of his years of reporting on the Ice Hockey World Championships, the International Ice Hockey Federation (IIHF) awarded Thurn und Taxis with an IIHF gold medal.

Later, he hosted the sports magazine show Blickpunkt Sport on Bayerischen Rundfunk and moderated the Sportschau on ARD.

Beginning in August 1993, Thurn und Taxis began hosting live Fußball-Bundesliga matches on the Munich-based pay television channel Sky Deutschland.

== Marriage ==
Thurn und Taxis married morganatically to Beata von Béry (b. 1947), daughter of the Hungarian journalist, László von Béry (1898–1971) and his wife, Countess Paula Apponyi de Nagy-Appony, both members of the Hungarian nobility, on 4 June 1977 in Munich, Bavaria, Germany.

The marriage remained childless and they didn't have any known children.

Fritz von Thurn und Taxis House of Thurn and Taxis Cadet branch of the House of Tassis Born: 22 June 1950
German royalty
Preceded by Albert	House of Thurn and Taxis line of succession 2nd position	Succeeded by Prince Karl Ferdinand of Thurn and Taxis
