= Albert von Thurn und Taxis =

German aristocrat and race car driver (born 1983)

Albert
- Prince of Thurn and Taxis
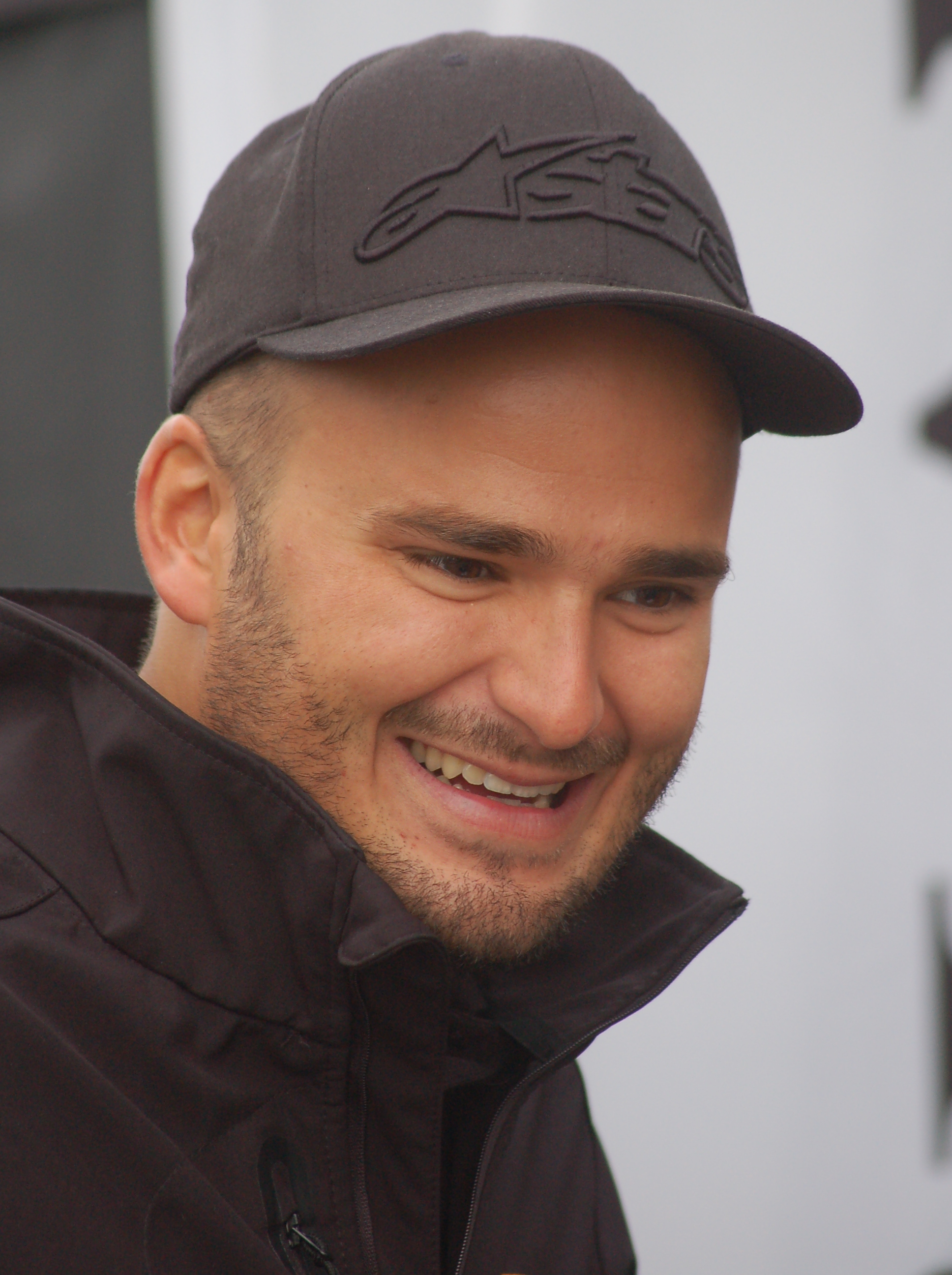
- Prince Albert in 2011

Head of the House of Thurn and Taxis
- Tenure: 14 December 1990 – present
- Predecessor: Johannes
- Heir presumptive: Friedrich
- Born: 24 June 1983 (age 43); Regensburg, Bavaria, Germany
Names
- German: Albert Maria Lamoral Miguel Johannes Gabriel Fürst von Thurn und Taxis
- House: Thurn and Taxis
- Father: Johannes, 11th Prince of Thurn and Taxis
- Mother: Gloria, Princess of Thurn and Taxis
- Religion: Catholic
- Categorisation: FIA Silver

Albert Fürst von Thurn und Taxis (officially Albert Maria Lamoral Miguel Johannes Gabriel Prinz von Thurn und Taxis, pronounced [ˈalbɛʁt maˈʁiːa lamoˈʁal miˈɡɛl joˈhanəs ˈɡaːbʁieːl fʏʁst fɔn ˈtʊʁn ʔʊnt ˈtaksɪs]; born 24 June 1983), is a German aristocrat, businessman and race car driver. He has been listed as the world's youngest billionaire many times since his father's death in 1990, first appearing on the list when he was eight years old.

== Biography ==
=== Family ===
Through descent from King Miguel I of Portugal, Albert is related to several reigning hereditary heads of state in Europe. He also descends from the dynasties of Wittelsbach, Saxe-Coburg-Gotha, Braganza and the House of Habsburg-Lorraine. The House of Thurn und Taxis is a German family whose fortune derives from the appointment of an ancestor, Leonhard von Taxis, as hereditary postmaster general of the Holy Roman Empire in 1595. Albert's father preceded him as the head of this family, which has several branches. The family of Thurn und Taxis remains well known as owners of breweries and former builders of castles. The family seat is Saint Emmeram's Abbey.

His father, Johannes von Thurn und Taxis, an internationally renowned boulevardier, died in 1990 when Albert was seven years old, leaving the young boy to inherit a US$3 billion fortune and US$500 million in debts. His mother, Gloria (née Countess von Schönburg-Glauchau), a popular media figure since marriage to his 53-year-old father as a 20-year-old, was instrumental in preserving the family fortune until Albert became of legal age to take over its management. He has two older sisters: Princess Maria Theresia and Princess Elisabeth.

=== Education ===
Thurn und Taxis completed his high school education in Rome and then, after his military service, he studied economics and theology at the University of Edinburgh. Prince Albert completed a doctorate in philosophy at the Pontifical University of Saint Thomas Aquinas (Angelicum) in 2022, defending a dissertation entitled: Rational Nature Or Wishful Thinking? Freedom & Rationality in Aquinas And Their Medieval Critique.

=== Media attention ===
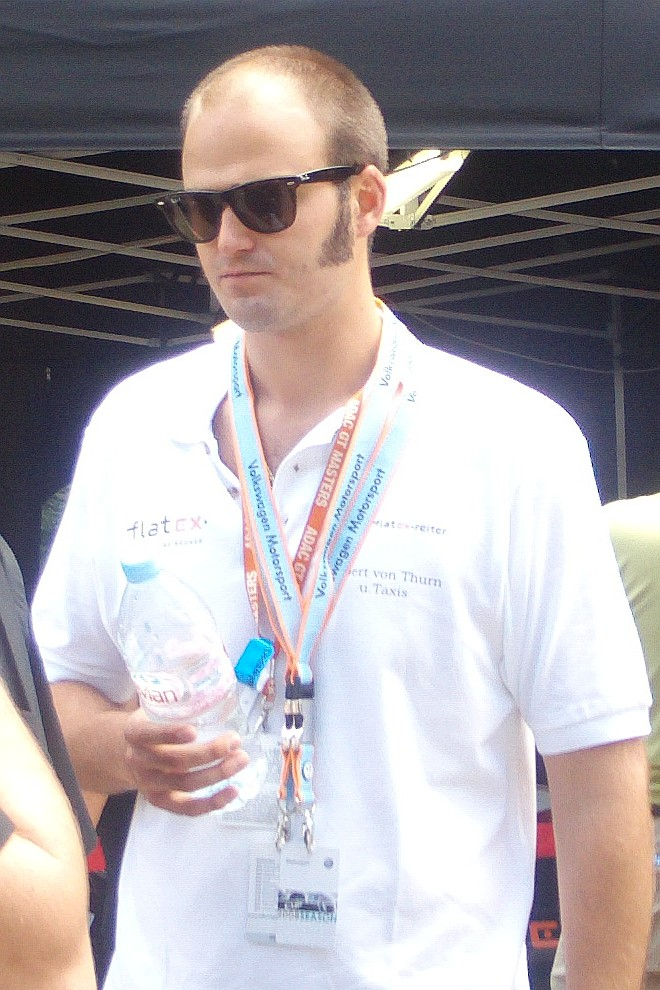
Prince Albert in 2008

In 2008, Albert was included as 11th on the list of the Forbes Magazine's List of The 20 Hottest Young Royals as compiled by Forbes magazine.

=== Motorsport ===
Von Thurn und Taxis is a racing driver, vice-champion (2007/2008) and champion (2010) of the German GT Championship ADAC GT Masters with the German Team Reiter Engineering.

He embarked on a career in rallying in 2009, competing in the European Rally Championship since 2016. In March 2026, von Thurn und Taxis and his co-driver received minor injuries during the Rebenland Rally in Austria when their car came off the road and fell 50 meters down a slope.

== Honours ==
=== Dynastic honours ===
- House of Thurn und Taxis: Knight Grand Cross of the Order of Parfaite Amitié.
- Calabrian House of Bourbon-Two Sicilies: Knight Grand Cross of Justice of the Calabrian Two Sicilian Order of Saint George.

== Racing record ==
=== Complete GT1 World Championship results ===
Year	Team	Car	1	2	3	4	5	6	7	8	9	10	11	12	13	14	15	16	17	18	Pos	Points
2012	Reiter Engineering	Lamborghini	NOG; QR; 3	NOG; CR; 8	ZOL; QR; Ret	ZOL; CR; 8	NAV; QR; 12	NAV; QR; 14	SVK; QR; 2	SVK; CR; Ret	ALG; QR; 13	ALG; CR; Ret	SVK; QR; 11	SVK; CR; Ret	MOS; QR	MOS; CR	NUR; QR	NUR; CR	DON; QR	DON; CR	18th	18

=== Complete World Rally Championship results ===
Year	Entrant	Car	1	2	3	4	5	6	7	8	9	10	11	12	13	14	WDC	Points
2018	Albert von Thurn und Taxis	Škoda Fabia R5	MON	SWE	MEX	FRA	ARG	POR	ITA	FIN	GER; Ret	TUR	GBR	ESP	AUS		NC	0
2019	Albert von Thurn und Taxis	Škoda Fabia R5	MON	SWE	MEX	FRA	ARG	CHL	POR	ITA; 27	FIN	GER	TUR	GBR	ESP	AUS; C	NC	0
2021	Albert von Thurn und Taxis	Škoda Fabia R5 Evo	MON	ARC; Ret	CRO	POR	ITA	KEN	EST	BEL	GRE	FIN	ESP	MNZ			NC	0

=== Complete World Rally Championship-3 results ===
Year	Entrant	Car	1	2	3	4	5	6	7	8	9	10	11	12	WDC	Points
2021	Albert von Thurn und Taxis	Škoda Fabia R5 Evo	MON	ARC; Ret	CRO	POR	ITA	KEN	EST	BEL	GRE	FIN	ESP	MNZ	NC	0

Albert von Thurn und Taxis House of Thurn and Taxis Cadet branch of the House of Tassis Born: 24 June 1983
German nobility
Preceded by Johannes	Prince of Thurn and Taxis; 14 December 1990 – present	Incumbent; Heir: Fritz von Thurn und Taxis
Sporting positions
Preceded by Christian Abt	ADAC GT Masters Champion; 2010 with: Peter Kox	Succeeded by Dino Lunardi; Alexandros Margaritis
