= Marc Basseng =

German racing driver

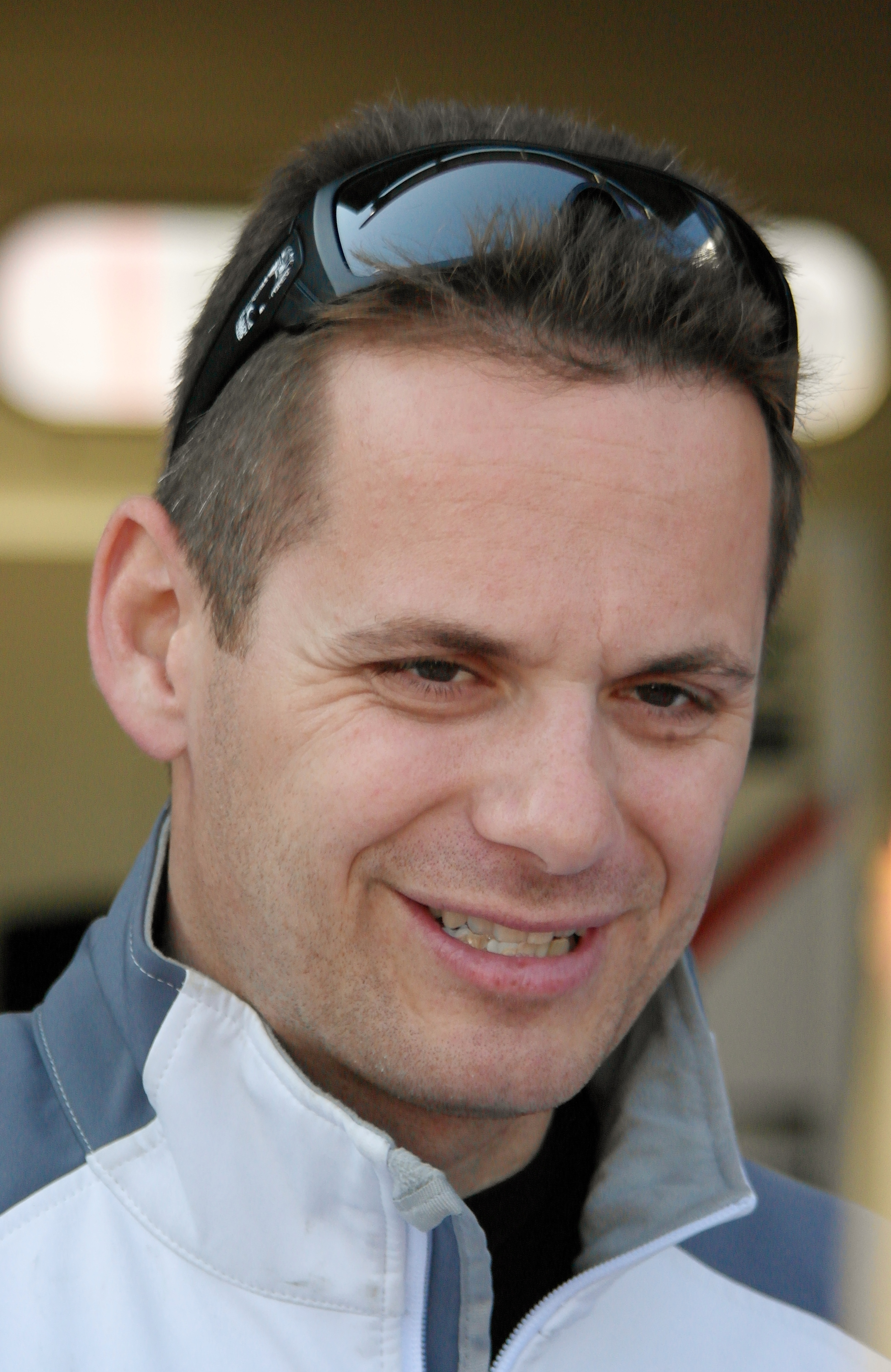
- Basseng at the Brands Hatch round of the 2014 Blancpain Sprint Series season.
- Nationality: (Germany) German
- Born: 12 December 1978 (age 47) Engelskirchen, Germany
- Categorisation: FIA Gold (until 2019); FIA Silver (2020–)

Previous series
- 2013 2010–2012 2008 2007–2009 2007 2007 2007 2006, 2008–2009 2005 2004-06 2003 2001-02 1997-98, 2003, 06: WTCC; FIA GT1 World Championship; ADAC GT Masters; American Le Mans Series; Le Mans Series; FIA GT Championship; Porsche Supercup; FIA GT3; ADAC Volkswagen Polo Cup; VLN; Clio Cup Germany; Renault Sport Clio Trophy; Porsche Carrera Cup Germany

Championship titles
- 2012 2004: FIA GT1 World Championship; Clio Cup Germany

Marc Basseng (born 12 December 1978 in Engelskirchen) is a German racing driver. A long-term Münnich Motorsport driver and team manager, he won the FIA GT1 World Championship in 2012 and competed in the WTCC. He also won the 2012 Nürburgring 24 Hours for Audi.

== Career ==
Basseng began his career in karting. In 1997, he began competing in the Porsche Carrera Cup Germany for the UPS Porsche Junior Team, finishing third in the 1998 standings. He raced in the Renault Sport Clio Trophy in 2001 and 2002 and won the German Clio Cup in 2003.

In 2004, Basseng began to compete in the VLN Nürburgring Endurance Series, where he has claimed 26 overall wins. He also competed part-time at the FIA GT3 European Championship, FIA GT Championship, Le Mans Series, American Le Mans Series and ADAC GT Masters. In 2008, he raced full-time at the American Le Mans Series in a Porsche 911 for Farnbacher Loles and VICI Racing.

Basseng began racing in the new FIA GT1 World Championship in 2010 for the All-Inkl.com Münnich Motorsport team, for which he also serves as team manager. On 26 July 2010, Marc Basseng achieved the lap record in a Pagani Zonda R on the Nürburgring Nordschleife. In 2011, he finished fifth in the standings for Münnich, sharing his ride with Markus Winkelhock. In 2012, he claimed the world championship with Winkelhock, managing to win a race and finishing ten times in the podium.

Basseng moved with Münnich Motorsport to the World Touring Car Championship for 2013. As he was the reigning FIA GT1 World Champion, he was ruled to be ineligible for the Yokohama Independents' Trophy. He finished 13th overall at the end of the season, with a season best of fourth place at Monza.

On November 1st 2026, Marc Basseng piloted the BYD Yangwang U9 Xtreme to 503,17 km/h, breaking the Guiness record for the fastest electric car.

== Racing record ==
=== Complete GT1 World Championship results ===
Year	Team	Car	1	2	3	4	5	6	7	8	9	10	11	12	13	14	15	16	17	18	19	20	Pos	Points
2010	All-Inkl.com Münnich Motorsport	Lamborghini	ABU; QR; Ret	ABU; CR; 17	SIL; QR; 17	SIL; CR; Ret	BRN; QR; 14	BRN; CR; 13	PRI; QR; 16	PRI; CR; 17	SPA; QR; 15	SPA; CR; Ret	NÜR; QR; DNS	NÜR; CR; 19	ALG; QR; Ret	ALG; CR; 17	NAV; QR; 8	NAV; CR; Ret	INT; QR; EX	INT; CR; EX	SAN; QR; 14	SAN; CR; 6	39th	8
2011	All-Inkl.com Münnich Motorsport	Lamborghini	ABU; QR; 6	ABU; CR; 3	ZOL; QR; 1	ZOL; CR; 1	ALG; QR; 7	ALG; CR; 6	SAC; QR; 9	SAC; CR; Ret	SIL; QR; Ret	SIL; CR; 5	NAV; QR; 1	NAV; CR; 2	PRI; QR; 7	PRI; CR; 8	ORD; QR; EX	ORD; CR; 8	BEI; QR; 12	BEI; CR; Ret	SAN; QR; 6	SAN; CR; Ret	5th	102
2012	All-Inkl.com Münnich Motorsport	Mercedes-Benz	NOG; QR; 6	NOG; CR; 3	ZOL; QR; 6	ZOL; CR; 9	NAV; QR; 5	NAV; QR; 2	SVK; QR; 4	SVK; CR; 3	ALG; QR; 1	ALG; CR; 2	SVK; QR; 3	SVK; CR; 2	MOS; QR; 2	MOS; CR; 5	NUR; QR; 3	NUR; CR; 2	DON; QR; 5	DON; CR; EX			**1st**	**145**

=== Complete World Touring Car Championship results ===
(key) (Races in bold indicate pole position) (Races in italics indicate fastest lap)

Year	Team	Car	1	2	3	4	5	6	7	8	9	10	11	12	13	14	15	16	17	18	19	20	21	22	23	24	Pos	Pts
2013	ALL-INKL.COM Münnich Motorsport	SEAT León WTCC	ITA; 1; 14	ITA; 2; 4	MAR; 1; 7	MAR; 2; 5	SVK; 1; 16	SVK; 2; 15	HUN; 1; 11	HUN; 2; 17	AUT; 1 Ret	AUT; 2; 11	RUS; 1; 18	RUS; 2; 13	POR; 1; 10	POR; 2; 5	ARG; 1; 12	ARG; 2 Ret	USA; 1; 9	USA; 2; 9	JPN; 1; 9	JPN; 2; 17	CHN; 1; 15	CHN; 2; 18	MAC; 1; 7	MAC; 2; 7	13th	57

=== Complete Blancpain Sprint Series results ===
Year	Team	Car	Class	1	2	3	4	5	6	7	8	9	10	11	12	13	14	Pos.	Points
2014	Phoenix Racing	Audi R8 LMS ultra	Pro	NOG; QR; 10	NOG; CR; 9	BRH; QR; 13	BRH; CR; 11	ZAN; QR; 10	ZAN; CR; 13	SVK; QR; 8	SVK; CR; 7	ALG; QR; 11	ALG; CR; 7	ZOL; QR; 15	ZOL; CR; 15	BAK; QR; DNS	BAK; CR; DNS	18th	14
2014	Phoenix Racing	Audi R8 LMS ultra	Pro-Am Trophy			BRH; QR; 13	BRH; CR; 11	**ZAN**; **QR**; 10	ZAN; CR; 13	SVK; QR; 8	SVK; CR; 7	ALG; QR; 11	ALG; CR; 7	**ZOL**; **QR**; 15	ZOL; CR; 15	**BAK**; **QR**; DNS	BAK; CR; DNS	1st	162

=== Complete IMSA SportsCar Championship results ===
(key) (Races in bold indicate pole position; results in italics indicate fastest lap)

Year	Team	Class	Make	Engine	1	2	3	4	5	6	7	8	9	10	11	12	Pos.	Points
2014	GMG Racing	GTD	Audi R8 LMS ultra	Audi 5.2 L V10	DAY; 28	SEB; 11	LGA	DET	WGL	MOS	IND	ELK	VIR	COA	COA		79th	22
2015	Mühlner Motorsports America	GTD	Porsche 911 GT America	Porsche 4.0L Flat-6	DAY; 15†	SEB	LGA	BEL	WGL	LIM	ELK	VIR	AUS	ATL			60th	1
2016	Konrad Motorsport	GTD	Lamborghini Huracán GT3	Lamborghini 5.2 L V10	DAY; 10	SEB	LGA	BEL	WGL	MOS	LIM	ELK	VIR	AUS	PET		50th	22
2017	Konrad Motorsport	GTD	Lamborghini Huracán GT3	Lamborghini 5.2 L V10	DAY; 20	SEB	LBH	AUS	BEL	WGL	MOS	LIM	ELK	VIR	LGA	PET	79th	11

^{†} Basseng did not complete sufficient laps in order to score full points.

Sporting positions
Preceded by John Bowe; Garry Holt; Paul Morris	Winner of the Bathurst 12 Hour; 2011 (with Darryl O'Young & Christopher Mies)	Succeeded by Darryl O'Young; Christopher Mies; Christer Jöns
Preceded by Michael Krumm; Lucas Luhr	FIA GT1 World Champion; 2012 with: Markus Winkelhock	Succeeded by None (Series ended)
