= Mühlner Motorsport =

Belgian auto racing team

(Belgium) Mühlner Motorsport
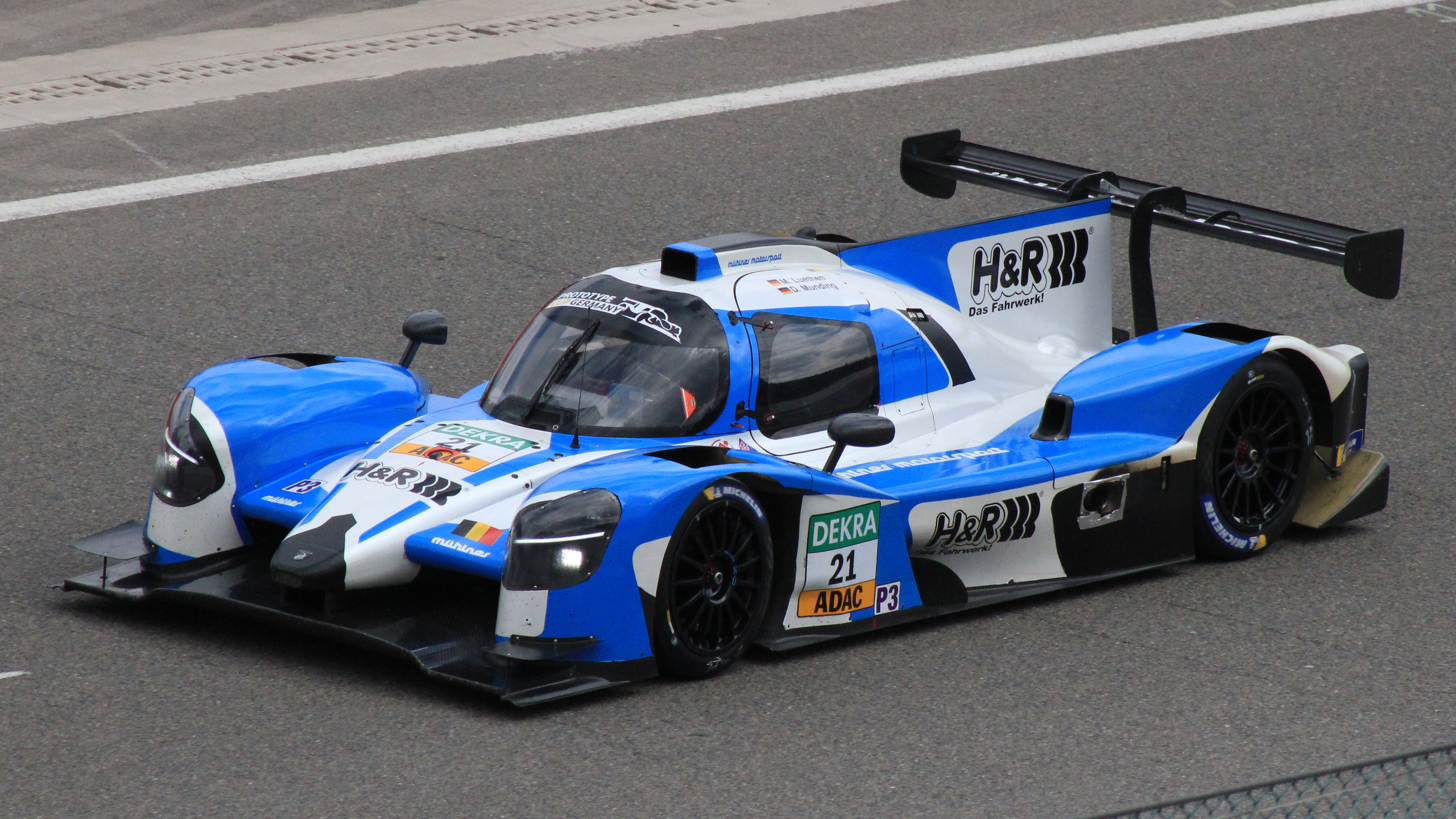
- Current series: European Le Mans Series; IMSA SportsCar Championship; IMSA Prototype Challenge; Porsche Endurance Cup Nürburgring

Mühlner Motorsport is a Belgian auto racing team competing in the FIA GT1 World Championship. It will enter two Porsche 997 GT3-Rs in the 2012 season under the name Exim Bank Team China, and it will compete under a Chinese racing licence. The team's drivers for the 2012 season are Ren Wei and Benjamin Lariche in car #8, and Mike Parisy and Matt Halliday in car #9.
