= 2012 Blancpain Endurance Series =

Sports season

Seasons
- ← 2011 2013 →

The 2012 Blancpain Endurance Series season was the second season of the Blancpain Endurance Series. The season featured six rounds lasting three hours each, starting on 14 April at Monza and ended in October at Navarra. An improved support package was added with the British Formula 3 Championship and Blancpain Revival Series was present at selected rounds and the Lamborghini Blancpain Super Trofeo was present at all events.

== Calendar ==
On 9 December 2011, the Stéphane Ratel Organisation announced the 2012 calendar.

Rnd	Circuit	Date
1	Autodromo Nazionale Monza, Monza, Italy	15 April
2	(United Kingdom) Silverstone Circuit, Silverstone, Great Britain	3 June
3	Circuit Paul Ricard, Le Castellet, France	1 July
4	Total 24 Hours of Spa, Circuit de Spa-Francorchamps, Belgium	29 July
5	Nürburgring, Nürburg, Germany	23 September
6	Circuito de Navarra, Los Arcos, Spain	14 October

== Entry list ==
On 17 February, SRO released the provisional entry list for the first round at Monza. This was updated on 10 March.

2012 Entry List
Team	No.	Drivers	Car	Rounds
Pro Cup
(Belgium) Belgian Audi Club WRT	1	(Monaco) Stéphane Ortelli	Audi R8 LMS Ultra	All
(Belgium) Belgian Audi Club WRT	1	(Germany) Christopher Mies	Audi R8 LMS Ultra	All
(Belgium) Belgian Audi Club WRT	1	(Germany) Christopher Haase	Audi R8 LMS Ultra	All
(Belgium) Belgian Audi Club WRT	2	(Belgium) Laurens Vanthoor	Audi R8 LMS Ultra	All
(Belgium) Belgian Audi Club WRT	2	(Sweden) Edward Sandström	Audi R8 LMS Ultra	All
(Belgium) Belgian Audi Club WRT	2	(Italy) Marco Bonanomi	Audi R8 LMS Ultra	1, 3–6
(Belgium) Belgian Audi Club WRT	2	(Italy) Andrea Piccini	Audi R8 LMS Ultra	2
(Belgium) Belgian Audi Club WRT	6	(Germany) Frank Stippler	Audi R8 LMS Ultra	6
(Belgium) Belgian Audi Club WRT	6	(Portugal) Filipe Albuquerque	Audi R8 LMS Ultra	6
(Belgium) Belgian Audi Club WRT	6	(United Kingdom) Oliver Jarvis	Audi R8 LMS Ultra	6
(Germany) Audi Sport Team Phoenix	6	(Switzerland) Marcel Fässler	Audi R8 LMS Ultra	4
(Germany) Audi Sport Team Phoenix	6	(Germany) André Lotterer	Audi R8 LMS Ultra	4
(Germany) Audi Sport Team Phoenix	6	(Denmark) Tom Kristensen	Audi R8 LMS Ultra	4
(Germany) Audi Sport Team Phoenix	16	(Italy) Andrea Piccini	Audi R8 LMS Ultra	4
(Germany) Audi Sport Team Phoenix	16	(Germany) René Rast	Audi R8 LMS Ultra	4
(Germany) Audi Sport Team Phoenix	16	(Germany) Frank Stippler	Audi R8 LMS Ultra	4
(Germany) Audi Sport Team Phoenix	13	(Switzerland) Harold Primat	Audi R8 LMS Ultra	5
(Germany) Audi Sport Team Phoenix	13	(Germany) René Rast	Audi R8 LMS Ultra	5
(Germany) Audi Sport Team Phoenix	13	(Germany) Luca Ludwig	Audi R8 LMS Ultra	5
(Belgium) KRK Racing	13	(Austria) Karl Wendlinger	Mercedes-Benz SLS AMG GT3	1–2
(Belgium) KRK Racing	13	(Belgium) Koen Wauters	Mercedes-Benz SLS AMG GT3	1–2
(Belgium) KRK Racing	13	(Belgium) Anthony Kumpen	Mercedes-Benz SLS AMG GT3	1–2
(Belgium) Marc VDS Racing Team	3	(Belgium) Bas Leinders	BMW Z4 GT3	All
(Belgium) Marc VDS Racing Team	3	(Belgium) Maxime Martin	BMW Z4 GT3	All
(Belgium) Marc VDS Racing Team	3	(Finland) Markus Palttala	BMW Z4 GT3	All
(Belgium) Marc VDS Racing Team	4	(Switzerland) Henri Moser	BMW Z4 GT3	All
(Belgium) Marc VDS Racing Team	4	(Belgium) Bert Longin	BMW Z4 GT3	All
(Belgium) Marc VDS Racing Team	4	(Netherlands) Mike Hezemans	BMW Z4 GT3	1–5
(Belgium) Marc VDS Racing Team	4	(Netherlands) Nick Catsburg	BMW Z4 GT3	6
(Belgium) Boutsen Ginion Racing	5	(Belgium) Nico Verdonck	McLaren MP4-12C GT3	1–3, 5–6
(Belgium) Boutsen Ginion Racing	5	(United Kingdom) Jack Clarke	McLaren MP4-12C GT3	1–3
(Belgium) Boutsen Ginion Racing	5	(Belgium) Edouard Mondron	McLaren MP4-12C GT3	1–3
(Belgium) Boutsen Ginion Racing	5	(Japan) Seiji Ara	McLaren MP4-12C GT3	5
(Belgium) Boutsen Ginion Racing	5	(United Kingdom) Marino Franchitti	McLaren MP4-12C GT3	5
(Belgium) Boutsen Ginion Racing	5	(Spain) Andy Soucek	McLaren MP4-12C GT3	6
(Belgium) Boutsen Ginion Racing	5	(Switzerland) Zoël Amberg	McLaren MP4-12C GT3	6
(France) Hexis Racing	7	(France) Frédéric Makowiecki	McLaren MP4-12C GT3	6
(France) Hexis Racing	7	(Netherlands) Stef Dusseldorp	McLaren MP4-12C GT3	6
(France) Hexis Racing	7	(Portugal) Álvaro Parente	McLaren MP4-12C GT3	6
(United Kingdom) Gulf Racing UK	9	(United Kingdom) Rob Bell	McLaren MP4-12C GT3	4
(United Kingdom) Gulf Racing UK	9	(United Kingdom) Andy Meyrick	McLaren MP4-12C GT3	4
(United Kingdom) Gulf Racing UK	9	(United Kingdom) Michael Wainwright	McLaren MP4-12C GT3	4
(United Kingdom) Gulf Racing UK	69	(United Kingdom) Jamie Campbell-Walter	McLaren MP4-12C GT3	4
(United Kingdom) Gulf Racing UK	69	(United Kingdom) Stuart Hall	McLaren MP4-12C GT3	4
(United Kingdom) Gulf Racing UK	69	(Germany) Roald Goethe	McLaren MP4-12C GT3	4
(Germany) Black Falcon	18	(Netherlands) Jeroen Bleekemolen	Mercedes-Benz SLS AMG GT3	5–6
(Germany) Black Falcon	18	(China) Franky Cheng	Mercedes-Benz SLS AMG GT3	5–6
(Germany) Black Falcon	18	(France) Mike Parisy	Mercedes-Benz SLS AMG GT3	5
(Germany) Black Falcon	18	(Austria) Dominik Baumann	Mercedes-Benz SLS AMG GT3	6
(United States) United Autosports	22	(Australia) David Brabham	McLaren MP4-12C GT3	1–3
(United States) United Autosports	22	(Portugal) Alvaro Parente	McLaren MP4-12C GT3	1–3
(United States) United Autosports	22	(United Kingdom) Matt Bell	McLaren MP4-12C GT3	1–3
(Germany) Blancpain Reiter	24	(Netherlands) Peter Kox	Lamborghini Gallardo LP600+	6
(Germany) Blancpain Reiter	24	(Netherlands) Jos Menten	Lamborghini Gallardo LP600+	6
(Germany) Blancpain Reiter	24	(Slovakia) Štefan Rosina	Lamborghini Gallardo LP600+	6
(Netherlands) DB Motorsport	36	(Belgium) Jeffrey van Hooydonk	BMW Z4 GT3	1–4
(Netherlands) DB Motorsport	36	(Belgium) Stéphane Lémeret	BMW Z4 GT3	1–4
(Netherlands) DB Motorsport	36	(Netherlands) Jeroen den Boer	BMW Z4 GT3	1–4
(France) Saintéloc Racing	40	(Portugal) Filipe Albuquerque	Audi R8 LMS Ultra	4
(France) Saintéloc Racing	40	(France) Grégory Guilvert	Audi R8 LMS Ultra	4–6
(France) Saintéloc Racing	40	(France) Dino Lunardi	Audi R8 LMS Ultra	4–6
(France) Saintéloc Racing	40	(Switzerland) Jonathan Hirschi	Audi R8 LMS Ultra	5
(Germany) Lapidus Racing	62	(United Kingdom) Tim Mullen	McLaren MP4-12C GT3	3
(Germany) Lapidus Racing	62	(United Kingdom) Phil Quaife	McLaren MP4-12C GT3	3
(Germany) Lapidus Racing	62	(Netherlands) Klaas Hummel	McLaren MP4-12C GT3	3
(Germany) Vita4One Racing Team	66	(Belgium) Gregory Franchi	BMW Z4 GT3	All
(Germany) Vita4One Racing Team	66	(Germany) Frank Kechele	BMW Z4 GT3	All
(Germany) Vita4One Racing Team	66	(Netherlands) Yelmer Buurman	BMW Z4 GT3	1
(Germany) Vita4One Racing Team	66	(United Kingdom) Adam Carroll	BMW Z4 GT3	2
(Germany) Vita4One Racing Team	66	(Austria) Mathias Lauda	BMW Z4 GT3	3–6
(Switzerland) Kessel Racing	71	(Italy) Davide Rigon	Ferrari 458 Italia GT3	All
(Switzerland) Kessel Racing	71	(Italy) Daniel Zampieri	Ferrari 458 Italia GT3	All
(Switzerland) Kessel Racing	71	(Italy) Stefano Gattuso	Ferrari 458 Italia GT3	All
(Belgium) Prospeed Competition	75	(Belgium) Marc Goossens	Porsche 997 GT3-R	All
(Belgium) Prospeed Competition	75	(Netherlands) Xavier Maassen	Porsche 997 GT3-R	All
(Belgium) Prospeed Competition	75	(Germany) Marc Hennerici	Porsche 997 GT3-R	All
(Switzerland) Emil Frey Racing	80	(Switzerland) Fredy Barth	Jaguar XK Emil Frey G3	2–3, 6
(Switzerland) Emil Frey Racing	80	(Switzerland) Gabriele Gardel	Jaguar XK Emil Frey G3	2–3, 6
(Switzerland) Emil Frey Racing	80	(Switzerland) Lorenz Frey	Jaguar XK Emil Frey G3	2–3, 6
(France) SMG Challenge	83	(France) Olivier Pla	Porsche 997 GT3-R	1, 3–5
(France) SMG Challenge	83	(France) Eric Clément	Porsche 997 GT3-R	1, 3–5
(France) SMG Challenge	83	(France) Philippe Gache	Porsche 997 GT3-R	1, 3–4
(France) SMG Challenge	83	(France) Nicolas Armindo	Porsche 997 GT3-R	5
(Belgium) GPR Racing	89	(Belgium) Tim Verbergt	Aston Martin V12 Vantage GT3	5
(Belgium) GPR Racing	89	(Belgium) Damien Dupont	Aston Martin V12 Vantage GT3	5
(Belgium) GPR Racing	89	(Belgium) Ronnie Latinne	Aston Martin V12 Vantage GT3	5
Pro-Am Cup
(Belgium) Boutsen Ginion Racing	5	(United Kingdom) Jack Clarke	McLaren MP4-12C GT3	4
(Belgium) Boutsen Ginion Racing	5	(Belgium) Nico Verdonck	McLaren MP4-12C GT3	4
(Belgium) Boutsen Ginion Racing	5	(Belgium) Eric van de Poele	McLaren MP4-12C GT3	4
(Belgium) Boutsen Ginion Racing	5	(Belgium) Edouard Mondron	McLaren MP4-12C GT3	4
(Belgium) Boutsen Ginion Racing	15	(Italy) Massimo Vagliani	McLaren MP4-12C GT3	4
(Belgium) Boutsen Ginion Racing	15	(Belgium) Sarah Bovy	McLaren MP4-12C GT3	4
(Belgium) Boutsen Ginion Racing	15	(France) Marlène Broggi	McLaren MP4-12C GT3	4
(Belgium) Boutsen Ginion Racing	15	(Belgium) Jérôme Thiry	McLaren MP4-12C GT3	4–6
(Belgium) Boutsen Ginion Racing	15	(Belgium) Edouard Mondron	McLaren MP4-12C GT3	5–6
(Belgium) Boutsen Ginion Racing	15	(Switzerland) Fabien Thuner	McLaren MP4-12C GT3	6
(Slovakia) ARC Bratislava	7	(Slovakia) Miro Konôpka	Porsche 997 GT3-R	1–4
(Slovakia) ARC Bratislava	7	(Slovakia) Zdeno Mikulasko	Porsche 997 GT3-R	1–4
(Slovakia) ARC Bratislava	7	(Italy) Stefano Crotti	Porsche 997 GT3-R	1–4
(Slovakia) ARC Bratislava	7	(Belgium) Christoff Corten	Porsche 997 GT3-R	4
(Germany) Haribo Racing Team	8	(Germany) Mike Stursberg	Porsche 997 GT3-R	1, 3–5
(Germany) Haribo Racing Team	8	(Germany) Hans Guido Riegel	Porsche 997 GT3-R	1, 3–5
(Germany) Haribo Racing Team	8	(United Kingdom) Richard Westbrook	Porsche 997 GT3-R	1, 5
(Germany) Haribo Racing Team	8	(Germany) Christian Menzel	Porsche 997 GT3-R	3–4
(Germany) Haribo Racing Team	8	(Germany) Uwe Alzen	Porsche 997 GT3-R	4
(United Kingdom) Gulf Racing UK	9	(United Kingdom) Rob Bell	McLaren MP4-12C GT3	1–3, 5–6
(United Kingdom) Gulf Racing UK	9	(United Kingdom) Michael Wainwright	McLaren MP4-12C GT3	1–3, 5–6
(United Kingdom) Gulf Racing UK	69	(Germany) Roald Goethe	McLaren MP4-12C GT3	1–3, 5
(United Kingdom) Gulf Racing UK	69	(United Kingdom) Stuart Hall	McLaren MP4-12C GT3	1, 3, 5
(United Kingdom) Gulf Racing UK	69	(United Kingdom) Jamie Campbell-Walter	McLaren MP4-12C GT3	2
(France) SOFREV Auto Sport Promotion	10	(France) Jérôme Policand	Ferrari 458 Italia GT3	1–3, 5–6
(France) SOFREV Auto Sport Promotion	10	(France) Gabriel Balthazard	Ferrari 458 Italia GT3	1–3, 5–6
(France) SOFREV Auto Sport Promotion	10	(France) Mike Savary	Ferrari 458 Italia GT3	1, 3
(France) SOFREV Auto Sport Promotion	10	(France) Maurice Ricci	Ferrari 458 Italia GT3	2, 5–6
(France) SOFREV Auto Sport Promotion	10	(France) Olivier Panis	Ferrari 458 Italia GT3	4
(France) SOFREV Auto Sport Promotion	10	(France) Fabien Barthez	Ferrari 458 Italia GT3	4
(France) SOFREV Auto Sport Promotion	10	(France) Morgan Moulin Traffort	Ferrari 458 Italia GT3	4
(France) SOFREV Auto Sport Promotion	10	(France) Eric Debard	Ferrari 458 Italia GT3	4
(France) SOFREV Auto Sport Promotion	20	(France) Patrice Goueslard	Ferrari 458 Italia GT3	All
(France) SOFREV Auto Sport Promotion	20	(France) Ludovic Badey	Ferrari 458 Italia GT3	All
(France) SOFREV Auto Sport Promotion	20	(France) Jean-Luc Beaubélique	Ferrari 458 Italia GT3	All
(France) SOFREV Auto Sport Promotion	20	(France) Tristan Vautier	Ferrari 458 Italia GT3	4
(France) Ruffier Racing	11	(France) Jean-Claude Lagniez	Porsche 997 GT3-R	1–3
(France) Ruffier Racing	11	(France) Xavier Pompidou	Porsche 997 GT3-R	1–2
(France) Ruffier Racing	11	(France) Gabriel Abergel	Porsche 997 GT3-R	1–2
(France) Ruffier Racing	11	(France) Mike Parisy	Porsche 997 GT3-R	3
(France) Ruffier Racing	11	(France) Laurent Pasquali	Porsche 997 GT3-R	3
(France) Sport Garage	11	(France) Gilles Duqueine	Ferrari 458 Italia GT3	4
(France) Sport Garage	11	(France) Eric Vaissière	Ferrari 458 Italia GT3	4
(France) Sport Garage	11	(France) André-Alain Corbel	Ferrari 458 Italia GT3	4
(France) Sport Garage	11	(France) Christian Beroujon	Ferrari 458 Italia GT3	4
(France) Sport Garage	42	(France) Kevin Despinasse	Ferrari 458 Italia GT3	All
(France) Sport Garage	42	(Republic of Ireland) Emmet O'Brien	Ferrari 458 Italia GT3	1–3, 5–6
(France) Sport Garage	42	(France) Arno Santamato	Ferrari 458 Italia GT3	1–3, 6
(France) Sport Garage	42	(France) Lionel Comole	Ferrari 458 Italia GT3	4
(France) Sport Garage	42	(France) Romain Brandela	Ferrari 458 Italia GT3	4
(France) Sport Garage	42	(France) Michaël Petit	Ferrari 458 Italia GT3	4
(France) Sport Garage	42	(France) Paul Lanchère	Ferrari 458 Italia GT3	5
(France) ART Grand Prix	12	(United Kingdom) Duncan Tappy	McLaren MP4-12C GT3	All
(France) ART Grand Prix	12	(France) Grégoire Demoustier	McLaren MP4-12C GT3	All
(France) ART Grand Prix	12	(France) Mike Parisy	McLaren MP4-12C GT3	4
(France) ART Grand Prix	12	(France) Ulric Amado	McLaren MP4-12C GT3	4
(Belgium) KRK Racing	14	(Belgium) Raf Vanthoor	Mercedes-Benz SLS AMG GT3	1–4
(Belgium) KRK Racing	14	(Netherlands) Dennis Retera	Mercedes-Benz SLS AMG GT3	1–4
(Belgium) KRK Racing	14	(Netherlands) Marius Ritskes	Mercedes-Benz SLS AMG GT3	1–2
(Belgium) KRK Racing	14	(Belgium) Koen Wauters	Mercedes-Benz SLS AMG GT3	3–4
(Belgium) KRK Racing	14	(Belgium) Anthony Kumpen	Mercedes-Benz SLS AMG GT3	4
(United States) Insight Racing	17	(Denmark) Martin Jensen	Ferrari 458 Italia GT3	All
(United States) Insight Racing	17	(Denmark) Dennis Andersen	Ferrari 458 Italia GT3	All
(United States) Insight Racing	17	(United Kingdom) Iain Dockerill	Ferrari 458 Italia GT3	4
(Germany) Black Falcon	18	(United States) Bret Curtis	Mercedes-Benz SLS AMG GT3	1–4
(Germany) Black Falcon	18	(Luxembourg) Steve Jans	Mercedes-Benz SLS AMG GT3	1–4
(Germany) Black Falcon	18	(United Kingdom) Sean Edwards	Mercedes-Benz SLS AMG GT3	1
(Germany) Black Falcon	18	(France) Mike Parisy	Mercedes-Benz SLS AMG GT3	2
(Germany) Black Falcon	18	(Netherlands) Jeroen Bleekemolen	Mercedes-Benz SLS AMG GT3	3–4
(Germany) Black Falcon	18	(China) Franky Cheng	Mercedes-Benz SLS AMG GT3	4
(Germany) Black Falcon	19	(United Kingdom) Oliver Morley	Mercedes-Benz SLS AMG GT3	All
(Germany) Black Falcon	19	(Germany) Riccardo Brutschin	Mercedes-Benz SLS AMG GT3	1–3
(Germany) Black Falcon	19	(Belgium) Jérôme Thiry	Mercedes-Benz SLS AMG GT3	1–2
(Germany) Black Falcon	19	(Germany) Manuel Metzger	Mercedes-Benz SLS AMG GT3	3–4
(Germany) Black Falcon	19	(Germany) Kenneth Heyer	Mercedes-Benz SLS AMG GT3	4
(Germany) Black Falcon	19	(Germany) Stephan Rösler	Mercedes-Benz SLS AMG GT3	4
(Germany) Black Falcon	19	(United Kingdom) Sean Edwards	Mercedes-Benz SLS AMG GT3	5–6
(Germany) Black Falcon	19	(Luxembourg) Steve Jans	Mercedes-Benz SLS AMG GT3	5–6
(United Kingdom) MTECH	21	(Republic of Ireland) Matt Griffin	Ferrari 458 Italia GT3	1–5
(United Kingdom) MTECH	21	(United Kingdom) Duncan Cameron	Ferrari 458 Italia GT3	1–5
(United Kingdom) MTECH	21	(United Kingdom) Mike Edmonds	Ferrari 458 Italia GT3	2–4
(United Kingdom) MTECH	21	(Italy) Niki Cadei	Ferrari 458 Italia GT3	4
(United States) United Autosports	23	(United Kingdom) Mark Blundell	McLaren MP4-12C GT3	1–3
(United States) United Autosports	23	(United States) Mark Patterson	McLaren MP4-12C GT3	1–3
(United States) United Autosports	23	(United States) Zak Brown	McLaren MP4-12C GT3	1–3
(United States) United Autosports	23	(United Kingdom) Mark Blundell	Audi R8 LMS Ultra	4
(United States) United Autosports	23	(United States) Mark Patterson	Audi R8 LMS Ultra	4
(United States) United Autosports	23	(Hong Kong) Alain Li	Audi R8 LMS Ultra	4
(United States) United Autosports	23	(United Kingdom) Richard Meins	Audi R8 LMS Ultra	4
(Germany) Blancpain Reiter	24	(Netherlands) Peter Kox	Lamborghini Gallardo LP600+	2–5
(Germany) Blancpain Reiter	24	(Switzerland) Marc A. Hayek	Lamborghini Gallardo LP600+	2–5
(Germany) Blancpain Reiter	24	(Netherlands) Jos Menten	Lamborghini Gallardo LP600+	4
(Germany) Blancpain Reiter	24	(Germany) Albert von Thurn und Taxis	Lamborghini Gallardo LP600+	4
(Italy) ROAL Motorsport	29	(Netherlands) Tom Coronel	BMW Z4 GT3	4
(Italy) ROAL Motorsport	29	(Italy) Edoardo Liberati	BMW Z4 GT3	4
(Italy) ROAL Motorsport	29	(Italy) Michela Cerruti	BMW Z4 GT3	4
(Italy) ROAL Motorsport	29	(Italy) Stefano Colombo	BMW Z4 GT3	4
(United Kingdom) GT3 Racing	30	(United Kingdom) Craig Wilkins	Audi R8 LMS	All
(United Kingdom) GT3 Racing	30	(United Kingdom) Peter Belshaw	Audi R8 LMS	1–5
(United Kingdom) GT3 Racing	30	(United Kingdom) Aaron Scott	Audi R8 LMS	1–4, 6
(United Kingdom) GT3 Racing	30	(United Kingdom) Phil Keen	Audi R8 LMS	4
(United Kingdom) GT3 Racing	30	(United Kingdom) Adam Christodoulou	Audi R8 LMS	5
(France) Pro GT by Alméras	33	(France) Antoine Leclerc	Porsche 997 GT3-R	All
(France) Pro GT by Alméras	33	(France) Eric Dermont	Porsche 997 GT3-R	All
(France) Pro GT by Alméras	33	(France) David Tuchbant	Porsche 997 GT3-R	All
(France) Pro GT by Alméras	33	(France) Franck Perera	Porsche 997 GT3-R	4
(France) Pro GT by Alméras	34	(France) Anthony Beltoise	Porsche 997 GT3-R	All
(France) Pro GT by Alméras	34	(France) Henry Hassid	Porsche 997 GT3-R	All
(France) Pro GT by Alméras	34	(France) Roland Bervillé	Porsche 997 GT3-R	1–4, 6
(France) Pro GT by Alméras	34	(France) Nicolas Armindo	Porsche 997 GT3-R	4
(United Kingdom) GT Academy Team RJN	35	(United Kingdom) Alex Buncombe	Nissan GT-R Nismo GT3	1–4
(United Kingdom) GT Academy Team RJN	35	(United Kingdom) Jann Mardenborough	Nissan GT-R Nismo GT3	1–4
(United Kingdom) GT Academy Team RJN	35	(United Kingdom) Chris Ward	Nissan GT-R Nismo GT3	1–4
(United Kingdom) GT Academy Team RJN	35	(Spain) Lucas Ordóñez	Nissan GT-R Nismo GT3	4
(Netherlands) DB Motorsport	36	(Netherlands) Jeroen den Boer	BMW Z4 GT3	5–6
(Netherlands) DB Motorsport	36	(Germany) Nico Bastian	BMW Z4 GT3	5
(Netherlands) DB Motorsport	36	(Italy) Alessandro Garofano	BMW Z4 GT3	5
(Netherlands) DB Motorsport	36	(United Kingdom) Michael Mallock	BMW Z4 GT3	6
(Netherlands) DB Motorsport	36	(Austria) Nikolaus Mayr-Melnhof	BMW Z4 GT3	6
(Netherlands) DB Motorsport	37	(Netherlands) Simon Knap	BMW Z4 GT3	All
(Netherlands) DB Motorsport	37	(Netherlands) Jochen Habets	BMW Z4 GT3	All
(Netherlands) DB Motorsport	37	(Canada) Andrew Danyliw	BMW Z4 GT3	All
(Netherlands) DB Motorsport	37	(Netherlands) Leon Rijnbeek	BMW Z4 GT3	4
(United Kingdom) Scuderia Vittoria	38	(Italy) Alessandro Bonetti	Ferrari 458 Italia GT3	1–2
(United Kingdom) Scuderia Vittoria	38	(United Kingdom) Jay Palmer	Ferrari 458 Italia GT3	1–2
(United Kingdom) Scuderia Vittoria	38	(United Kingdom) Michael Lyons	Ferrari 458 Italia GT3	1
(United Kingdom) Scuderia Vittoria	38	(United Kingdom) David McDonald	Ferrari 458 Italia GT3	2, 6
(United Kingdom) Scuderia Vittoria	38	(United Kingdom) Jody Fannin	Ferrari 458 Italia GT3	6
(United Kingdom) Scuderia Vittoria	38	(Paraguay) Danny Candia	Ferrari 458 Italia GT3	6
(France) Saintéloc Racing	40	(France) David Hallyday	Audi R8 LMS Ultra	1–3
(France) Saintéloc Racing	40	(France) Jérôme Demay	Audi R8 LMS Ultra	1–3
(France) Saintéloc Racing	40	(France) Grégory Guilvert	Audi R8 LMS Ultra	1–3
(France) Saintéloc Racing	43	(France) Dino Lunardi	Audi R8 LMS Ultra	3
(France) Saintéloc Racing	43	(France) Marc Sourd	Audi R8 LMS Ultra	3
(France) Saintéloc Racing	43	(France) Patrice Madeleine	Audi R8 LMS Ultra	3
(France) Saintéloc Racing	43	(France) Adrien Tambay	Audi R8 LMS Ultra	6
(France) Saintéloc Racing	43	(France) Jérôme Demay	Audi R8 LMS Ultra	6
(France) Saintéloc Racing	43	(France) Jean-Marc Quintois	Audi R8 LMS Ultra	6
(Switzerland) Kessel Racing	46	(Italy) Valentino Rossi	Ferrari 458 Italia GT3	1, 5
(Switzerland) Kessel Racing	46	(Italy) Alessio Salucci	Ferrari 458 Italia GT3	1, 5
(Switzerland) Kessel Racing	46	(Italy) Andrea Ceccato	Ferrari 458 Italia GT3	5
(Switzerland) Kessel Racing	72	(Switzerland) Gino Forgione	Ferrari 458 Italia GT3	1–3
(Switzerland) Kessel Racing	72	(Switzerland) Maurice Basso	Ferrari 458 Italia GT3	1
(Switzerland) Kessel Racing	72	(Italy) Max Mugelli	Ferrari 458 Italia GT3	1
(Switzerland) Kessel Racing	72	(France) Claude-Yves Gosselin	Ferrari 458 Italia GT3	2–5
(Switzerland) Kessel Racing	72	(France) Marc Rostan	Ferrari 458 Italia GT3	2, 4–5
(Switzerland) Kessel Racing	72	(France) Mathias Beche	Ferrari 458 Italia GT3	3
(Switzerland) Kessel Racing	72	(France) Pierre Bruneau	Ferrari 458 Italia GT3	4–5
(Switzerland) Kessel Racing	72	(Italy) Lorenzo Bontempelli	Ferrari 458 Italia GT3	4
(Portugal) ASM Team	47	(Saudi Arabia) Karim Ojjeh	McLaren MP4-12C GT3	1–2, 4
(Portugal) ASM Team	47	(Portugal) Ricardo Bravo	McLaren MP4-12C GT3	1–2, 4
(Portugal) ASM Team	47	(Portugal) Lourenço Beirão da Veiga	McLaren MP4-12C GT3	1
(Portugal) ASM Team	47	(Portugal) Pedro Lamy	McLaren MP4-12C GT3	4
(Portugal) ASM Team	47	(Portugal) Luis Silva	McLaren MP4-12C GT3	4
(Italy) AF Corse	49	(France) Yannick Mallégol	Ferrari 458 Italia GT3	All
(Italy) AF Corse	49	(United States) Howard Blank	Ferrari 458 Italia GT3	All
(Italy) AF Corse	49	(France) Jean-Marc Bachelier	Ferrari 458 Italia GT3	All
(Italy) AF Corse	49	(France) François Perrodo	Ferrari 458 Italia GT3	4
(Italy) AF Corse	50	(South Africa) Jack Gerber	Ferrari 458 Italia GT3	All
(Italy) AF Corse	50	(Italy) Marco Cioci	Ferrari 458 Italia GT3	1, 3–6
(Italy) AF Corse	50	(Italy) Raffaele Giammaria	Ferrari 458 Italia GT3	2, 4
(Italy) AF Corse	50	(Belgium) Enzo Ide	Ferrari 458 Italia GT3	4–5
(Italy) AF Corse	51	(Italy) Giuseppe Cirò	Ferrari 458 Italia GT3	All
(Italy) AF Corse	51	(United Kingdom) Daniel Brown	Ferrari 458 Italia GT3	All
(Italy) AF Corse	51	(Venezuela) Gaetano Ardagna Perez	Ferrari 458 Italia GT3	All
(Italy) AF Corse	51	(Finland) Toni Vilander	Ferrari 458 Italia GT3	4
(Italy) AF Corse	52	(Netherlands) Niek Hommerson	Ferrari 458 Italia GT3	All
(Italy) AF Corse	52	(Belgium) Louis Machiels	Ferrari 458 Italia GT3	All
(Italy) AF Corse	52	(Italy) Andrea Bertolini	Ferrari 458 Italia GT3	1, 3–5
(Italy) AF Corse	52	(Italy) Maurizio Mediani	Ferrari 458 Italia GT3	2
(Italy) AF Corse	52	(Italy) Alessandro Pier Guidi	Ferrari 458 Italia GT3	4, 6
Vita4One Team Italy	57	(Italy) Giacomo Petrobelli	Ferrari 458 Italia GT3	All
Vita4One Team Italy	57	(Italy) Eugenio Amos	Ferrari 458 Italia GT3	All
Vita4One Team Italy	57	(Italy) Alessandro Bonacini	Ferrari 458 Italia GT3	All
Vita4One Team Italy	57	(Switzerland) Jonathan Hirschi	Ferrari 458 Italia GT3	4
Vita4One Team Italy	59	(Italy) Andrea Ceccato	Ferrari 458 Italia GT3	2, 4
Vita4One Team Italy	59	(United Kingdom) Michael Lyons	Ferrari 458 Italia GT3	2, 4
Vita4One Team Italy	59	(United Kingdom) Josh Wakefield	Ferrari 458 Italia GT3	2
Vita4One Team Italy	59	(Italy) Alessandro Bonetti	Ferrari 458 Italia GT3	3–4
Vita4One Team Italy	59	(Belgium) Andrea Barlesi	Ferrari 458 Italia GT3	3
Vita4One Team Italy	59	(United Kingdom) Jay Palmer	Ferrari 458 Italia GT3	3
Vita4One Team Italy	59	(Czech Republic) Filip Salaquarda	Ferrari 458 Italia GT3	4
(France) Exagon Engineering	58	(Belgium) Vincent Radermecker	Porsche 997 GT3-R	1
(France) Exagon Engineering	58	(Belgium) Christian Kelders	Porsche 997 GT3-R	1
(Australia) Von Ryan Racing	60	(United Kingdom) Stephen Jelley	McLaren MP4-12C GT3	All
(Australia) Von Ryan Racing	60	(United Kingdom) Julien Draper	McLaren MP4-12C GT3	All
(Australia) Von Ryan Racing	60	(United Kingdom) Matthew Draper	McLaren MP4-12C GT3	All
(Australia) Von Ryan Racing	60	(Netherlands) Stef Dusseldorp	McLaren MP4-12C GT3	4
(Australia) Von Ryan Racing	88	(United Kingdom) Rob Barff	McLaren MP4-12C GT3	All
(Australia) Von Ryan Racing	88	(South Africa) Leon Price	McLaren MP4-12C GT3	1–3, 5–6
(Australia) Von Ryan Racing	88	(South Africa) Jordan Grogor	McLaren MP4-12C GT3	1–3, 5–6
(Australia) Von Ryan Racing	88	(Portugal) Álvaro Parente	McLaren MP4-12C GT3	4
(Australia) Von Ryan Racing	88	(United Kingdom) Chris Goodwin	McLaren MP4-12C GT3	4
(Australia) Von Ryan Racing	88	(New Zealand) Roger Wills	McLaren MP4-12C GT3	4
(Germany) Lapidus Racing	62	(United Kingdom) Tim Mullen	McLaren MP4-12C GT3	4
(Germany) Lapidus Racing	62	(United Kingdom) Adam Christodoulou	McLaren MP4-12C GT3	4
(Germany) Lapidus Racing	62	(United Kingdom) Phil Quaife	McLaren MP4-12C GT3	4
(Germany) Lapidus Racing	62	(Netherlands) Klaas Hummel	McLaren MP4-12C GT3	4
(Switzerland) Black Bull Swiss Racing	64	(Italy) Mirko Venturi	Ferrari 458 Italia GT3	1, 3
(Switzerland) Black Bull Swiss Racing	64	(Italy) Andrea Invernizzi	Ferrari 458 Italia GT3	1, 3
(Switzerland) Black Bull Swiss Racing	64	(Italy) Tommaso Maino	Ferrari 458 Italia GT3	1, 3
(Netherlands) Race Art	70	(Netherlands) Roger Grouwels	BMW Z4 GT3	1–5
(Netherlands) Race Art	70	(Netherlands) Niels Bouwhuis	BMW Z4 GT3	1, 3
(Netherlands) Race Art	70	(Netherlands) Phil Bastiaans	BMW Z4 GT3	1
(Netherlands) Race Art	70	(Netherlands) Nick Catsburg	BMW Z4 GT3	2–5
(Netherlands) Race Art	70	(United Kingdom) Robert Nearn	BMW Z4 GT3	2, 4
(Netherlands) Race Art	70	(Netherlands) Jaap van Lagen	BMW Z4 GT3	4–5
(Belgium) Prospeed Competition	74	(Belgium) Maxime Soulet	Porsche 997 GT3-R	All
(Belgium) Prospeed Competition	74	(Netherlands) Paul van Splunteren	Porsche 997 GT3-R	All
(Belgium) Prospeed Competition	74	(Belgium) Dylan Derdaele	Porsche 997 GT3-R	All
(Belgium) Prospeed Competition	74	(Belgium) Fred Bouvy	Porsche 997 GT3-R	4
(United Kingdom) Ecurie Ecosse	79	(United Kingdom) Ollie Millroy	BMW Z4 GT3	1–3, 5–6
(United Kingdom) Ecurie Ecosse	79	(United Kingdom) Joe Twyman	BMW Z4 GT3	1–3, 5–6
(United Kingdom) Ecurie Ecosse	79	(United Kingdom) Andrew Smith	BMW Z4 GT3	1, 5–6
(United Kingdom) Ecurie Ecosse	79	(United Kingdom) Marco Attard	BMW Z4 GT3	2
(United Kingdom) Ecurie Ecosse	79	(United Kingdom) Oliver Bryant	BMW Z4 GT3	3
(Switzerland) Emil Frey Racing	80	(Switzerland) Fredy Barth	Jaguar XK Emil Frey G3	4
(Switzerland) Emil Frey Racing	80	(Switzerland) Gabriele Gardel	Jaguar XK Emil Frey G3	4
(Switzerland) Emil Frey Racing	80	(Switzerland) Lorenz Frey	Jaguar XK Emil Frey G3	4
(Switzerland) Emil Frey Racing	80	(Switzerland) Rolf Maritz	Jaguar XK Emil Frey G3	4
(Belgium) GPR Racing	89	(Belgium) Bertrand Baguette	Aston Martin V12 Vantage GT3	4
(Belgium) GPR Racing	89	(Belgium) Tim Verbergt	Aston Martin V12 Vantage GT3	4
(Belgium) GPR Racing	89	(Belgium) Damien Dupont	Aston Martin V12 Vantage GT3	4
(Belgium) GPR Racing	89	(Belgium) Ronnie Latinne	Aston Martin V12 Vantage GT3	4
(United Kingdom) Preci-Spark	90	(United Kingdom) David Jones	Mercedes-Benz SLS AMG GT3	1–5
(United Kingdom) Preci-Spark	90	(United Kingdom) Godfrey Jones	Mercedes-Benz SLS AMG GT3	1–5
(United Kingdom) Preci-Spark	90	(United Kingdom) Mike Jordan	Mercedes-Benz SLS AMG GT3	2–4
(United Kingdom) Preci-Spark	90	(Germany) Bernd Schneider	Mercedes-Benz SLS AMG GT3	4
(Italy) JAS Motorsport	91	(Japan) Akira Iida	McLaren MP4-12C GT3	1, 3
(Italy) JAS Motorsport	91	(Taiwan) Jun-San Chen	McLaren MP4-12C GT3	1, 3
(Italy) JAS Motorsport	91	(Taiwan) Morris Chen	McLaren MP4-12C GT3	1, 3
(United Kingdom) Beechdean-Aston Martin Racing	107	(United Kingdom) Jonathan Adam	Aston Martin V12 Vantage GT3	4
(United Kingdom) Beechdean-Aston Martin Racing	107	(United Kingdom) John Gaw	Aston Martin V12 Vantage GT3	4
(United Kingdom) Beechdean-Aston Martin Racing	107	(United Kingdom) Andrew Howard	Aston Martin V12 Vantage GT3	4
(United Kingdom) Beechdean-Aston Martin Racing	107	(United Kingdom) Phil Dryburgh	Aston Martin V12 Vantage GT3	4
Gentlemen Trophy
(Belgium) First Motorsport	25	(Belgium) Steve Vanbellingen	Porsche 997 GT3 Cup S	4
(Belgium) First Motorsport	25	(Belgium) Bert Redant	Porsche 997 GT3 Cup S	4
(Belgium) First Motorsport	25	(Belgium) Armand Fumal	Porsche 997 GT3 Cup S	4
(Belgium) First Motorsport	25	(Belgium) Johan Vanloo	Porsche 997 GT3 Cup S	4
(France) Ruffier Racing	31	(France) Georges Cabannes	Lamborghini Gallardo LP520	1–3, 5–6
(France) Ruffier Racing	31	(France) Romain Brandela	Lamborghini Gallardo LP520	1–3
(France) Ruffier Racing	31	(Switzerland) Fabien Thuner	Lamborghini Gallardo LP520	1–2, 5
(France) Ruffier Racing	31	(Spain) Miki Monrás	Lamborghini Gallardo LP520	3
(France) Ruffier Racing	31	(France) Fabien Michal	Lamborghini Gallardo LP520	5–6
(France) Saintéloc Racing	41	(Switzerland) Pierre Hirschi	Audi R8 LMS	All
(France) Saintéloc Racing	41	(United Kingdom) Robert Hissom	Audi R8 LMS	All
(France) Saintéloc Racing	41	(France) Marc Sourd	Audi R8 LMS	1–2
(France) Saintéloc Racing	41	(France) Philippe Marie	Audi R8 LMS	3–6
(France) Saintéloc Racing	41	(France) Jérôme Demay	Audi R8 LMS	4
(France) Exagon Engineering	58	(Belgium) Christian Kelders	Porsche 997 GT3-R	3–6
(France) Exagon Engineering	58	(France) Daniel Desbruères	Porsche 997 GT3-R	3–6
(France) Exagon Engineering	58	(France) Jean-Luc Blanchemain	Porsche 997 GT3-R	4
(France) Exagon Engineering	58	(France) Pascal Muller	Porsche 997 GT3-R	4
(Switzerland) Kessel Racing	73	(Argentina) Pablo Paladino	Ferrari 430 Scuderia	1–4
(Switzerland) Kessel Racing	73	(Venezuela) Paolo Andreasi	Ferrari 430 Scuderia	1–4
(Switzerland) Kessel Racing	73	(Switzerland) Beniamino Caccia	Ferrari 430 Scuderia	1–4
(Switzerland) Kessel Racing	73	(Italy) Giacomo Piccini	Ferrari 430 Scuderia	4
(Sweden) ALFAB Racing	81	(Sweden) Erik Behrens	Audi R8 LMS	4
(Sweden) ALFAB Racing	81	(Sweden) Daniel Roos	Audi R8 LMS	4
(Sweden) ALFAB Racing	81	(Sweden) Patrik Skoog	Audi R8 LMS	4
(Sweden) ALFAB Racing	81	(Sweden) Magnus Öhman	Audi R8 LMS	4
(France) GCR Racing	82	(France) Gaël Lesoudier	Dodge Viper CC	1–4
(France) GCR Racing	82	(France) Gilles Vannelet	Dodge Viper CC	1–4
(France) GCR Racing	82	(France) Luc Paillard	Dodge Viper CC	1–3
(France) GCR Racing	82	(France) Christophe Decultot	Dodge Viper CC	4
(France) GCR Racing	82	(France) Pierre Fontaine	Dodge Viper CC	4
(Belgium) Racing Adventures	85	(Belgium) Benjamin Bailly	Ford Mustang	4
(Belgium) Racing Adventures	85	(Belgium) Raphaël van der Straten	Ford Mustang	4
(Belgium) Racing Adventures	85	(Belgium) Nicolas De Crem	Ford Mustang	4
(Belgium) Racing Adventures	85	(Belgium) José Close	Ford Mustang	4
(Sweden) JB Motorsport	98	(Sweden) Jan Brunstedt	Audi R8 LMS	All
(Sweden) JB Motorsport	98	(Sweden) Mikael Bender	Audi R8 LMS	All
(Sweden) JB Motorsport	98	(Sweden) Jocke Mangs	Audi R8 LMS	1–4
(Sweden) JB Motorsport	98	(Sweden) Daniel Roos	Audi R8 LMS	4–6
Cup Class
(France) Pro GT by Alméras	32	(France) Alain Ferté	Porsche 997 GT3 Cup	4
(France) Pro GT by Alméras	32	(France) Matthieu Vaxivière	Porsche 997 GT3 Cup	4
(France) Pro GT by Alméras	32	(France) Jean-Louis Alloin	Porsche 997 GT3 Cup	4
(France) Pro GT by Alméras	32	(France) Jérémy Alloin	Porsche 997 GT3 Cup	4
(Netherlands) Race Art	76	(Netherlands) Mathijs Harkema	Porsche 997 GT3 Cup	4
(Netherlands) Race Art	76	(Belgium) 'Brody'	Porsche 997 GT3 Cup	4
(Netherlands) Race Art	76	(Belgium) Christophe Geoffroy	Porsche 997 GT3 Cup	4
(Netherlands) Race Art	76	(France) Phillipe Richard	Porsche 997 GT3 Cup	4
(France) RMS	86	(France) Thierry Stepec	Porsche 997 GT3 Cup	4
(France) RMS	86	(France) Eric Mouez	Porsche 997 GT3 Cup	4
(France) RMS	86	(France) David Loger	Porsche 997 GT3 Cup	4
(France) RMS	86	(France) Philippe Salini	Porsche 997 GT3 Cup	4
(France) RMS	87	(Switzerland) Fabio Spirgi	Porsche 997 GT3 Cup	4
(France) RMS	87	(Switzerland) Richard Feller	Porsche 997 GT3 Cup	4
(France) RMS	87	(France) Olivier Baron	Porsche 997 GT3 Cup	4
(France) RMS	87	(Switzerland) Manuel Nicolaïdis	Porsche 997 GT3 Cup	4
(Belgium) Speedlover	94	(Belgium) Christophe Bigourie	Porsche 997 GT3 Cup	4
(Belgium) Speedlover	94	(Belgium) Raf Vleugels	Porsche 997 GT3 Cup	4
(Belgium) Speedlover	94	(Belgium) Kevin Balthazard	Porsche 997 GT3 Cup	4

== Results ==
Event	Circuit	Pro Cup Winner	Pro-Am Cup Winner	Gentlemen Trophy Winner
1	Monza	No. 3 Marc VDS Racing Team	No. 57 Vita4One Team Italy	No. 73 Kessel Racing
1	Monza	(Belgium) Bas Leinders (Belgium) Maxime Martin (Finland) Markus Palttala	(Italy) Eugenio Amos (Italy) Alessandro Bonacini (Italy) Giacomo Petrobelli	(Argentina) Pablo Paladino (Venezuela) Paolo Andreasi (Switzerland) Beniamino Caccia
2	Silverstone	No. 3 Marc VDS Racing Team	No. 24 Blancpain Reiter	No. 98 JB Motorsport
2	Silverstone	(Belgium) Bas Leinders (Belgium) Maxime Martin (Finland) Markus Palttala	(Netherlands) Peter Kox (Switzerland) Marc A. Hayek	(Sweden) Jan Brunstedt (Sweden) Mikael Bender (Sweden) Jocke Mangs
3	Paul Ricard	No. 1 Belgian Audi Club WRT	No. 52 AF Corse	No. 58 Exagon Engineering
3	Paul Ricard	(Monaco) Stéphane Ortelli (Germany) Christopher Mies (Germany) Christopher Haase	(Netherlands) Niek Hommerson (Belgium) Louis Machiels (Italy) Andrea Bertolini	(France) Daniel Desbruères (Belgium) Christian Kelders
4	Spa-Francorchamps; Report	No. 16 Audi Sport Team Phoenix	No. 52 AF Corse	No. 25 First Motorsport
4	Spa-Francorchamps; Report	(Italy) Andrea Piccini (Germany) René Rast (Germany) Frank Stippler	(Netherlands) Niek Hommerson (Belgium) Louis Machiels (Italy) Andrea Bertolini (Italy) Alessandro Pier Guidi	(Belgium) Steve van Bellingen (Belgium) Bert Redant (Belgium) Armand Fumal (Belgium) Johan Van Loo
5	Nürburgring	No. 75 Prospeed Competition	No. 19 Black Falcon	No. 58 Exagon Engineering
5	Nürburgring	(Belgium) Marc Goossens (Germany) Marc Hennerici (Netherlands) Xavier Maassen	(United Kingdom) Sean Edwards (Luxembourg) Steve Jans (United Kingdom) Oliver Morley	(France) Daniel Desbruères (Belgium) Christian Kelders
6	Navarra	No. 7 Hexis Racing	No. 12 ART Grand Prix	No. 98 JB Motorsport
6	Navarra	(France) Frédéric Makowiecki (Netherlands) Stef Dusseldorp (Portugal) Álvaro Parente	(United Kingdom) Duncan Tappy (France) Grégoire Demoustier	(Sweden) Jan Brunstedt (Sweden) Mikael Bender (Sweden) Daniel Roos

== Championship standings ==
=== Drivers' Championships ===
Pos	Driver	MNZ (Italy)	SIL (United Kingdom)	LEC (France)	SPA (Belgium)	NÜR (Germany)	NAV (Spain)	Pts
Pro Cup
1	(Monaco) Stéphane Ortelli (Germany) Christopher Mies (Germany) Christopher Haase	7	3	1	2	4	2	114
2	(Finland) Markus Palttala (Belgium) Maxime Martin (Belgium) Bas Leinders	1	1	2	4	Ret	4	111
3	(Belgium) Marc Goossens (Netherlands) Xavier Maassen (Germany) Marc Hennerici	5	14	5	20	1	5	72
4	(Italy) Andrea Piccini		2		1			62
5	(Sweden) Edward Sandström (Belgium) Laurens Vanthoor	2	2	Ret	31	7	Ret	59
Pro-Am Cup
1	(Netherlands) Niek Hommerson (Belgium) Louis Machiels	17	18	4	5	Ret	16	76
2	(Italy) Andrea Bertolini	17		4	5	Ret		67
3	(Italy) Eugenio Amos (Italy) Alessandro Bonacini (Italy) Giacomo Petrobelli	6	6	7	37	Ret	Ret	65
4	(France) Patrice Goueslard (France) Ludovic Badey (France) Jean-Luc Beaubélique	8	8	Ret	10	12	15	64
5	(United Kingdom) Duncan Tappy (France) Grégoire Demoustier	16	13	13	Ret	11	9	58
Gentlemen Trophy
1	(Switzerland) Pierre Hirschi (United Kingdom) Robert Hissom	41	39	33	23	Ret	30	93
2	(Sweden) Jan Brunstedt (Sweden) Mikael Bender	Ret	38	30	33	Ret	38	82
3	(Sweden) Jocke Mangs	Ret	38	30	33			57
4	(Belgium) Christian Kelders (France) Daniel Desbruères			26	36	34	Ret	54
5	(France) Gilles Vannelet (France) Gaël Lesoudier	38	Ret	Ret	22			51

Colour	Result
Gold	Winner
Silver	Second place
Bronze	Third place
Green	Points classification
Blue	Non-points classification
Blue	Non-classified finish (NC)
Purple	Retired, not classified (Ret)
Red	Did not qualify (DNQ)
Red	Did not pre-qualify (DNPQ)
Black	Disqualified (DSQ)
White	Did not start (DNS)
White	Withdrew (WD)
White	Race cancelled (C)
Blank	Did not practice (DNP)
Blank	Did not arrive (DNA)
Blank	Excluded (EX)

=== Teams' Championships ===
Pos	Team	MNZ (Italy)	SIL (United Kingdom)	LEC (France)	SPA (Belgium)	NÜR (Germany)	NAV (Spain)	Pts
Pro Cup
1	(Belgium) Belgian Audi Club WRT	2	2	1	2	4	2	127
2	(Belgium) Marc VDS Racing Team	1	1	2	4	8	4	122
3	(Belgium) Prospeed Competition	5	14	5	20	1	5	80
4	(Germany) Vita4One Racing Team	12	9	Ret	3	3	7	68
5	(Switzerland) Kessel Racing	4	11	3	34	Ret	6	50
Pro-Am Cup
1	(Italy) AF Corse	17	10	4	5	25	14	94
2	(France) SOFREV Auto Sport Promotion	8	8	8	8	12	15	90
3	Vita4One Team Italy	6	6	7	37	Ret	Ret	67
4	(France) ART Grand Prix	16	13	13	Ret	11	9	60
5	(Germany) Black Falcon	43	15	10	19	6	13	59
Gentlemen Trophy
1	(France) Saintéloc Racing	41	39	33	23	Ret	30	93
2	(Sweden) JB Motorsport	Ret	38	30	33	Ret	27	82
3	(Belgium) Exagon Engineering			26	36	34	Ret	54
4	(Switzerland) Kessel Racing	37	44	Ret	56			49
4	(Belgium) First Motorsport				17			49
