= 2011 Blancpain Endurance Series =

Sports season

Seasons
- ← none 2012 →

The 2011 Blancpain Endurance Series season was the inaugural season of the Blancpain Endurance Series, the sports car racing series developed by the Stéphane Ratel Organisation and the Royal Automobile Club of Belgium (RACB) with approval from the Fédération Internationale de l'Automobile (FIA).

The season commenced on 17 April at Monza and concluded on 9 October at Silverstone.

== Calendar ==
On 15 December 2010, the Stéphane Ratel Organisation announced the 2011 calendar.

Rnd	Circuit	Date
1	Autodromo Nazionale Monza, Monza, Italy	17 April
2	Circuito de Navarra, Los Arcos, Spain	22 May
3	Total 24 Hours of Spa; Circuit de Spa-Francorchamps, Belgium	30 July
4	Circuit de Nevers Magny-Cours, France	27 August
5	(United Kingdom) Silverstone Circuit, Silverstone, Great Britain	9 October

== Entry list ==
On 9 March 2011 the SRO released an official entry list of the teams and manufacturers. The full entry list for Monza was released on 10 April.

Team	Class	Car	No.	Drivers	Rounds
(Germany) Vita4One	GT3 Pro	Ferrari 458 Italia GT3	1	(Germany) Frank Kechele	1–2, 4–5
(Germany) Vita4One	GT3 Pro	Ferrari 458 Italia GT3	1	(Belgium) Nico Verdonck	All
(Germany) Vita4One	GT3 Pro	Ferrari 458 Italia GT3	1	(Belgium) Eric van de Poele	3
(Germany) Vita4One	GT3 Pro	Ferrari 458 Italia GT3	1	(France) Jean-Karl Vernay	3–4
(Germany) Vita4One	GT3 Pro	Ferrari 458 Italia GT3	1	(Italy) Matteo Bobbi	5
(Germany) Vita4One	GT3 Pro	Ferrari 458 Italia GT3	1	(Germany) Michael Bartels	1–2
(Germany) Vita4One	GT3 Pro-Am	Ferrari 458 Italia GT3	2	(Germany) Michael Bartels	3, 5
(Germany) Vita4One	GT3 Pro-Am	Ferrari 458 Italia GT3	2	(Netherlands) Niek Hommerson	All
(Germany) Vita4One	GT3 Pro-Am	Ferrari 458 Italia GT3	2	(Belgium) Louis Machiels	All
(Germany) Vita4One	GT3 Pro-Am	Ferrari 458 Italia GT3	2	(Netherlands) Paul van Splunteren	1, 4
(Germany) Vita4One	GT3 Pro-Am	Ferrari 458 Italia GT3	2	(Italy) Andrea Bertolini	3
(Germany) Vita4One	GT3 Pro	Ferrari 458 Italia GT3	29	(Italy) Matteo Bobbi	3
(Germany) Vita4One	GT3 Pro	Ferrari 458 Italia GT3	29	(Germany) Frank Kechele	3
(Germany) Vita4One	GT3 Pro	Ferrari 458 Italia GT3	29	(Italy) Giacomo Petrobelli	3, 5
(Germany) Vita4One	GT3 Pro	Ferrari 458 Italia GT3	29	(Germany) Michael Bartels	4
(Germany) Vita4One	GT3 Pro	Ferrari 458 Italia GT3	29	(Czech Republic) Martin Matzke	4
(Germany) Vita4One	GT3 Pro	Ferrari 458 Italia GT3	29	(Czech Republic) Filip Salaquarda	4–5
(Germany) Vita4One	GT3 Pro	Ferrari 458 Italia GT3	29	(Brazil) Carlos Iaconelli	5
(France) Hexis AMR	GT3 Pro	Aston Martin DBRS9	3	(France) Julien Rodrigues	All
(France) Hexis AMR	GT3 Pro	Aston Martin DBRS9	3	(France) Yann Clairay	1–4
(France) Hexis AMR	GT3 Pro	Aston Martin DBRS9	3	(France) Pierre-Brice Mena	1–4
(France) Hexis AMR	GT3 Pro	Aston Martin DBRS9	3	(France) Laurent Cazenave	5
(France) Hexis AMR	GT3 Pro	Aston Martin DBRS9	3	(Netherlands) Stef Dusseldorp	5
(France) Hexis AMR	GT3 Pro	Aston Martin DBRS9	4	(France) Frédéric Makowiecki	All
(France) Hexis AMR	GT3 Pro	Aston Martin DBRS9	4	(Switzerland) Henri Moser	All
(France) Hexis AMR	GT3 Pro	Aston Martin DBRS9	4	(France) Gilles Vannelet	1–2, 4
(France) Hexis AMR	GT3 Pro	Aston Martin DBRS9	4	(Netherlands) Stef Dusseldorp	3
(France) Hexis AMR	GT3 Pro	Aston Martin DBRS9	4	(France) Yann Clairay	5
(Germany) Team Rhino's Leipert	GT3 Pro-Am	Lamborghini Gallardo LP600 GT3	6	(Portugal) Duarte Félix da Costa	All
(Germany) Team Rhino's Leipert	GT3 Pro-Am	Lamborghini Gallardo LP600 GT3	6	(Portugal) Lourenço da Veiga	All
(Germany) Team Rhino's Leipert	GT3 Pro-Am	Lamborghini Gallardo LP600 GT3	6	(Portugal) Ricardo Bravo	All
(Germany) Team Rhino's Leipert	GT3 Pro-Am	Lamborghini Gallardo LP600 GT3	6	(Finland) Mika Vahamaki	3
(Germany) Team Rhino's Leipert	GT3 Pro-Am	Lamborghini Gallardo LP600 GT3	7	(Netherlands) Olivier Tielemans	1–2
(Germany) Team Rhino's Leipert	GT3 Pro-Am	Lamborghini Gallardo LP600 GT3	7	(Finland) Mika Vahamaki	1–2
(Germany) Team Rhino's Leipert	GT3 Pro-Am	Lamborghini Gallardo LP600 GT3	7	(Austria) Niki Lanik	1
(Germany) Team Rhino's Leipert	GT3 Pro-Am	Lamborghini Gallardo LP600 GT3	7	(Germany) Dennis Vollmair	2
(Germany) Team Rhino's Leipert	GT3 Pro-Am	Lamborghini Gallardo LP600 GT3	7	(Argentina) José Manuel Balbiani	5
(Germany) Team Rhino's Leipert	GT3 Pro-Am	Lamborghini Gallardo LP600 GT3	7	(Argentina) Alejandro Chahwan	5
(Germany) Team Rhino's Leipert	GT3 Pro-Am	Lamborghini Gallardo LP600 GT3	7	(Argentina) Sebastián Martínez	5
(Belgium) GPR AMR	GT3 Pro-Am	Aston Martin DBRS9	8	(Belgium) Eddy Renard	1–3
(Belgium) GPR AMR	GT3 Pro-Am	Aston Martin DBRS9	8	(Belgium) Ludovic Sougnez	1–2
(Belgium) GPR AMR	GT3 Pro-Am	Aston Martin DBRS9	8	(Belgium) Christian Kelders	1
(Belgium) GPR AMR	GT3 Pro-Am	Aston Martin DBRS9	8	(Switzerland) Jonathan Hirschi	2
(Belgium) GPR AMR	GT3 Pro-Am	Aston Martin DBRS9	8	(Czech Republic) Tomáš Enge	3
(Belgium) GPR AMR	GT3 Pro-Am	Aston Martin DBRS9	8	(United Kingdom) Gavin Pickering	3
(Belgium) GPR AMR	GT3 Pro-Am	Aston Martin DBRS9	8	(Czech Republic) Jan Stoviček	3
(Belgium) GPR AMR	GT3 Gentlemen Trophy	Aston Martin DBRS9	78	(Belgium) Pierre Grivegnee	3
(Belgium) GPR AMR	GT3 Gentlemen Trophy	Aston Martin DBRS9	78	(Belgium) Alex van de Poele	3
(Belgium) GPR AMR	GT3 Gentlemen Trophy	Aston Martin DBRS9	78	(Belgium) Jean-Pierre Vandewauwer	3
(Belgium) GPR AMR	GT4	Aston Martin V8 Vantage GT4	88	(Italy) Giuseppe de Pasquale	1–2
(Belgium) GPR AMR	GT4	Aston Martin V8 Vantage GT4	88	(Italy) Raffaele Sangiuolo	1–2
(Belgium) GPR AMR	GT4	Aston Martin V8 Vantage GT4	88	(Switzerland) Léonard Vernet	1
(Belgium) GPR AMR	GT4	Aston Martin V8 Vantage GT4	88	(Belgium) Philippe "Brody" Broodcoren	2
(Italy) AutOrlando Sport	GT3 Pro	Porsche 997 GT3-R	9	(Italy) Gianluca Roda	All
(Italy) AutOrlando Sport	GT3 Pro	Porsche 997 GT3-R	9	(Italy) Raffaele Giammaria	All
(Italy) AutOrlando Sport	GT3 Pro	Porsche 997 GT3-R	9	(Italy) Paolo Ruberti	All
(France) SOFREV ASP	GT3 Pro	Ferrari 458 Italia GT3	10	(France) Patrice Goueslard	1–4
(France) SOFREV ASP	GT3 Pro	Ferrari 458 Italia GT3	10	(France) Julien Jousse	1–4
(France) SOFREV ASP	GT3 Pro	Ferrari 458 Italia GT3	10	(France) Jérôme Policand	1–2, 4
(France) SOFREV ASP	GT3 Pro	Ferrari 458 Italia GT3	10	(France) Olivier Pla	3
(France) SOFREV ASP	GT3 Pro-Am	Ferrari 458 Italia GT3	20	(France) Ludovic Badey	All
(France) SOFREV ASP	GT3 Pro-Am	Ferrari 458 Italia GT3	20	(France) Jean-Luc Beaubélique	All
(France) SOFREV ASP	GT3 Pro-Am	Ferrari 458 Italia GT3	20	(France) Franck Morel	All
(France) SOFREV ASP	GT3 Pro-Am	Ferrari 458 Italia GT3	20	(France) Guillaume Moreau	3
(United States) United Autosports	GT3 Pro-Am	Audi R8 LMS	11	(United Kingdom) Matt Bell	3
(United States) United Autosports	GT3 Pro-Am	Audi R8 LMS	11	(United Kingdom) Mark Blundell	3
(United States) United Autosports	GT3 Pro-Am	Audi R8 LMS	11	(United States) Eddie Cheever	3
(United States) United Autosports	GT3 Pro-Am	Audi R8 LMS	11	(United States) Mark Patterson	3
(United States) United Autosports	GT3 Pro-Am	Audi R8 LMS	12	(Hong Kong) Alain Li	3
(United States) United Autosports	GT3 Pro-Am	Audi R8 LMS	12	(Netherlands) Arie Luyendyk	3
(United States) United Autosports	GT3 Pro-Am	Audi R8 LMS	12	(United Kingdom) Richard Meins	3
(United States) United Autosports	GT3 Pro-Am	Audi R8 LMS	12	(France) Henri Richard	3
(United States) United Autosports	GT3 Pro-Am	Audi R8 LMS	23	(United States) Zak Brown	3
(United States) United Autosports	GT3 Pro-Am	Audi R8 LMS	23	(United Kingdom) Richard Dean	3
(United States) United Autosports	GT3 Pro-Am	Audi R8 LMS	23	(United Kingdom) Johnny Herbert	3
(United States) United Autosports	GT3 Pro-Am	Audi R8 LMS	23	(Sweden) Stefan Johansson	3
(Netherlands) KRK Racing Team Holland	GT3 Pro	Mercedes-Benz SLS AMG GT3	15	(Netherlands) Mike Hezemans	3
(Netherlands) KRK Racing Team Holland	GT3 Pro	Mercedes-Benz SLS AMG GT3	15	(Belgium) Anthony Kumpen	3
(Netherlands) KRK Racing Team Holland	GT3 Pro	Mercedes-Benz SLS AMG GT3	15	(Belgium) Koen Wauters	3
(Netherlands) KRK Racing Team Holland	GT3 Pro-Am	Mercedes-Benz SLS AMG GT3	16	(Netherlands) Bernhard van Oranje	3
(Netherlands) KRK Racing Team Holland	GT3 Pro-Am	Mercedes-Benz SLS AMG GT3	16	(Netherlands) Dennis Retera	3
(Netherlands) KRK Racing Team Holland	GT3 Pro-Am	Mercedes-Benz SLS AMG GT3	16	(Netherlands) Marius Ritskes	3
(Netherlands) KRK Racing Team Holland	GT3 Pro-Am	Mercedes-Benz SLS AMG GT3	16	(Belgium) Raf Vanthoor	3
(Italy) De Lorenzi Racing	GT3 Pro-Am	Porsche 997 GT3-R	18	(Italy) Gianluca de Lorenzi	1–4
(Italy) De Lorenzi Racing	GT3 Pro-Am	Porsche 997 GT3-R	18	(Italy) Alessandro Bonetti	1–4
(Italy) De Lorenzi Racing	GT3 Pro-Am	Porsche 997 GT3-R	18	(Italy) Stefano Borghi	1–2
(Italy) De Lorenzi Racing	GT3 Pro-Am	Porsche 997 GT3-R	18	(Italy) Lorenzo Bontempelli	3
(Italy) De Lorenzi Racing	GT3 Pro-Am	Porsche 997 GT3-R	18	(Italy) Beniamino Caccia	3
(Italy) De Lorenzi Racing	GT3 Gentlemen Trophy	Porsche 997 GT3 Cup	36	(Italy) Sergio Negroni	All
(Italy) De Lorenzi Racing	GT3 Gentlemen Trophy	Porsche 997 GT3 Cup	36	(Italy) Luigi Emiliani	1–2, 4–5
(Italy) De Lorenzi Racing	GT3 Gentlemen Trophy	Porsche 997 GT3 Cup	36	(Italy) Marco Cassera	1–2, 4–5
(Italy) De Lorenzi Racing	GT3 Gentlemen Trophy	Porsche 997 GT3 Cup	36	(Italy) Giorgio Piodi	3
(Italy) De Lorenzi Racing	GT3 Gentlemen Trophy	Porsche 997 GT3 Cup	36	(Italy) Roberto Fecchio	3
(Italy) De Lorenzi Racing	GT3 Gentlemen Trophy	Porsche 997 GT3 Cup	36	(Italy) Stefano Crotti	3
(Italy) De Lorenzi Racing	GT3 Gentlemen Trophy	Porsche 997 GT3 Cup S	37	(Italy) Giorgio Piodi	1–2, 4
(Italy) De Lorenzi Racing	GT3 Gentlemen Trophy	Porsche 997 GT3 Cup S	37	(Italy) Stefano Bianconi	1–2
(Italy) De Lorenzi Racing	GT3 Gentlemen Trophy	Porsche 997 GT3 Cup S	37	(Italy) Sergio Parato	1
(Italy) De Lorenzi Racing	GT3 Gentlemen Trophy	Porsche 997 GT3 Cup S	37	(Italy) Stefano Villa	2, 4
(Italy) De Lorenzi Racing	GT3 Gentlemen Trophy	Porsche 997 GT3 Cup S	37	(Italy) Matteo Milani	4
(Italy) De Lorenzi Racing	GT4	Ginetta G50 Cup	73	(Italy) Piero Limonta	1–2
(Italy) De Lorenzi Racing	GT4	Ginetta G50 Cup	73	(Italy) Fabrizio Ferrari	1–2
(Italy) De Lorenzi Racing	GT4	Ginetta G50 Cup	73	(Italy) Alberto Viglione	1
(Italy) De Lorenzi Racing	GT4	Ginetta G50 Cup	73	(Italy) Diego Alessi	2
(Belgium) Level Racing	GT3 Gentlemen Trophy	Porsche 997 GT3 Cup S	19	(Belgium) Philippe "Brody" Broodcoren	1, 3–5
(Belgium) Level Racing	GT3 Gentlemen Trophy	Porsche 997 GT3 Cup S	19	(France) Cyril Calmon	1
(Belgium) Level Racing	GT3 Gentlemen Trophy	Porsche 997 GT3 Cup S	19	(Belgium) Christoff Corten	3, 5
(Belgium) Level Racing	GT3 Gentlemen Trophy	Porsche 997 GT3 Cup S	19	(Belgium) Kurt Dujardin	3
(Belgium) Level Racing	GT3 Gentlemen Trophy	Porsche 997 GT3 Cup S	19	(Netherlands) Mathijs Harkema	3–5
(Belgium) Level Racing	GT3 Gentlemen Trophy	Porsche 997 GT3 Cup S	19	(Luxembourg) Pierre-Yves Rosoux	4
(France) Sport Garage	GT3 Gentlemen Trophy	Ferrari 430 Scuderia GT3	22	(France) Lionel Comole	All
(France) Sport Garage	GT3 Gentlemen Trophy	Ferrari 430 Scuderia GT3	22	(France) Philip Shearer	1–2
(France) Sport Garage	GT3 Gentlemen Trophy	Ferrari 430 Scuderia GT3	22	(France) Amandine Foulard	1–2
(France) Sport Garage	GT3 Gentlemen Trophy	Ferrari 430 Scuderia GT3	22	(France) André-Alain Corbel	3
(France) Sport Garage	GT3 Gentlemen Trophy	Ferrari 430 Scuderia GT3	22	(France) Thomas Duchêne	3
(France) Sport Garage	GT3 Gentlemen Trophy	Ferrari 430 Scuderia GT3	22	(France) Eric Vaissière	3
(France) Sport Garage	GT3 Gentlemen Trophy	Ferrari 430 Scuderia GT3	22	(France) Romain Brandela	4
(France) Sport Garage	GT3 Gentlemen Trophy	Ferrari 430 Scuderia GT3	22	(France) Paul Lanchère	4
(France) Sport Garage	GT3 Gentlemen Trophy	Ferrari 430 Scuderia GT3	22	(United Kingdom) Chris Dymond	5
(France) Sport Garage	GT3 Gentlemen Trophy	Ferrari 430 Scuderia GT3	22	(United Kingdom) Robert Hissom	5
(France) Sport Garage	GT3 Pro-Am	Ferrari 430 Scuderia GT3	42	(France) Éric Cayrolle	All
(France) Sport Garage	GT3 Pro-Am	Ferrari 430 Scuderia GT3	42	(France) Michaël Petit	All
(France) Sport Garage	GT3 Pro-Am	Ferrari 430 Scuderia GT3	42	(France) Christophe Jouet	1–3, 5
(France) Sport Garage	GT3 Pro-Am	Ferrari 430 Scuderia GT3	42	(France) Romain Brandela	3
(Germany) Blancpain Reiter	GT3 Pro-Am	Lamborghini Gallardo LP600 GT3	24	(Switzerland) Marc A. Hayek	1–3, 5
(Germany) Blancpain Reiter	GT3 Pro-Am	Lamborghini Gallardo LP600 GT3	24	(Netherlands) Peter Kox	1–3, 5
(Germany) Blancpain Reiter	GT3 Pro-Am	Lamborghini Gallardo LP600 GT3	24	(Netherlands) Jos Menten	3
(Germany) Blancpain Reiter	GT3 Pro	Lamborghini Gallardo LP600 GT3	25	(Germany) Albert von Thurn und Taxis	1–3
(Germany) Blancpain Reiter	GT3 Pro	Lamborghini Gallardo LP600 GT3	25	(Austria) Nikolaus Mayr-Melnhof	1–3
(Germany) Blancpain Reiter	GT3 Pro	Lamborghini Gallardo LP600 GT3	25	(Italy) Eugenio Amos	1–3
(Belgium) Delahaye Racing	GT3 Pro-Am	Corvette Z06 GT3	26	(Belgium) Jean-Luc Blanchemain	3
(Belgium) Delahaye Racing	GT3 Pro-Am	Corvette Z06 GT3	26	(Belgium) Frédéric Bouvy	3
(Belgium) Delahaye Racing	GT3 Pro-Am	Corvette Z06 GT3	26	(Belgium) Damien Coens	3
(Belgium) Delahaye Racing	GT3 Pro-Am	Corvette Z06 GT3	26	(Belgium) Christian Kelders	3
(France) Ruffier Racing	GT3 Gentlemen Trophy	Lamborghini Gallardo GT3	30	(France) Jacques Medard	1–2
(France) Ruffier Racing	GT3 Gentlemen Trophy	Lamborghini Gallardo GT3	30	(France) Gabriel Abergel	1–2
(France) Ruffier Racing	GT3 Gentlemen Trophy	Lamborghini Gallardo GT3	30	(France) Frédéric Da Rocha	4
(France) Ruffier Racing	GT3 Gentlemen Trophy	Lamborghini Gallardo GT3	30	(France) Patrice Lafargue	4
(France) Ruffier Racing	GT3 Gentlemen Trophy	Lamborghini Gallardo GT3	31	(France) Georges Cabannes	1–2, 4–5
(France) Ruffier Racing	GT3 Gentlemen Trophy	Lamborghini Gallardo GT3	31	(France) Grégory Guilvert	1, 4
(France) Ruffier Racing	GT3 Gentlemen Trophy	Lamborghini Gallardo GT3	31	(France) Fabien Michal	2, 4–5
(France) Ruffier Racing	GT3 Gentlemen Trophy	Lamborghini Gallardo GT3	31	(France) Gilles Vannelet	5
(Belgium) WRT Belgian Audi Club	GT3 Pro	Audi R8 LMS	32	(Belgium) Bert Longin	All
(Belgium) WRT Belgian Audi Club	GT3 Pro	Audi R8 LMS	32	(France) Stéphane Ortelli	All
(Belgium) WRT Belgian Audi Club	GT3 Pro	Audi R8 LMS	32	(Portugal) Filipe Albuquerque	All
(Belgium) WRT Belgian Audi Club	GT3 Pro	Audi R8 LMS	33	(Belgium) Gregory Franchi	All
(Belgium) WRT Belgian Audi Club	GT3 Pro	Audi R8 LMS	33	(Italy) Andrea Piccini	1–2, 4–5
(Belgium) WRT Belgian Audi Club	GT3 Pro	Audi R8 LMS	33	(Switzerland) Marcel Fässler	1–2, 4
(Belgium) WRT Belgian Audi Club	GT3 Pro	Audi R8 LMS	33	(Sweden) Mattias Ekström	3
(Belgium) WRT Belgian Audi Club	GT3 Pro	Audi R8 LMS	33	(Germany) Timo Scheider	3
(Belgium) WRT Belgian Audi Club	GT3 Pro	Audi R8 LMS	33	(Germany) Christopher Mies	5
(United Kingdom) JR Motorsports	GT3 Pro	Nissan GT-R GT3	35	(United Kingdom) Richard Westbrook	4–5
(United Kingdom) JR Motorsports	GT3 Pro	Nissan GT-R GT3	35	(Australia) David Brabham	4
(United Kingdom) JR Motorsports	GT3 Pro	Nissan GT-R GT3	35	(Netherlands) Nick Catsburg	5
(United Kingdom) JR Motorsports	GT3 Pro	Nissan GT-R GT3	35	(United Kingdom) Peter Dumbreck	5
(Germany) Black Falcon	GT3 Pro	Mercedes-Benz SLS AMG GT3	35	(Germany) Kenneth Heyer	3
(Germany) Black Falcon	GT3 Pro	Mercedes-Benz SLS AMG GT3	35	(Germany) Thomas Jäger	3
(Germany) Black Falcon	GT3 Pro	Mercedes-Benz SLS AMG GT3	35	(Belgium) Stéphane Lémeret	3
(Germany) Black Falcon	GT3 Pro-Am	Mercedes-Benz SLS AMG GT3	38	(United States) Bret Curtis	3
(Germany) Black Falcon	GT3 Pro-Am	Mercedes-Benz SLS AMG GT3	38	(Netherlands) Jeroen van den Heuvel	3
(Germany) Black Falcon	GT3 Pro-Am	Mercedes-Benz SLS AMG GT3	38	(Netherlands) Peter Van der Kolk	3
(Germany) Black Falcon	GT3 Pro-Am	Mercedes-Benz SLS AMG GT3	38	(Ukraine) Andrii Lebed	3
(United Kingdom) Scuderia Vittoria	GT3 Pro	Ferrari 458 Italia GT3	38	(Italy) Giacomo Petrobelli	1–2, 4
(United Kingdom) Scuderia Vittoria	GT3 Pro	Ferrari 458 Italia GT3	38	(Italy) Matteo Bobbi	1–2, 4
(United Kingdom) Scuderia Vittoria	GT3 Pro	Ferrari 458 Italia GT3	38	(Brazil) Carlos Iaconelli	1–2, 4
(Belgium) Marc VDS Racing Team	GT3 Pro	BMW Z4 GT3	40	(Belgium) Bas Leinders	3–5
(Belgium) Marc VDS Racing Team	GT3 Pro	BMW Z4 GT3	40	(Belgium) Maxime Martin	3–5
(Belgium) Marc VDS Racing Team	GT3 Pro	BMW Z4 GT3	40	(Germany) Marc Hennerici	3
(Belgium) Marc VDS Racing Team	GT3 Pro	BMW Z4 GT3	40	(Finland) Markus Palttala	4–5
(Belgium) Marc VDS Racing Team	GT3 Pro	Ford GT GT3	40	(Belgium) Bas Leinders	1–2
(Belgium) Marc VDS Racing Team	GT3 Pro	Ford GT GT3	40	(Finland) Markus Palttala	1–2
(Belgium) Marc VDS Racing Team	GT3 Pro	Ford GT GT3	40	(Belgium) Maxime Martin	1–2
(Belgium) Marc VDS Racing Team	GT3 Pro	Ford GT GT3	41	(Finland) Markus Palttala	3
(Belgium) Marc VDS Racing Team	GT3 Pro	Ford GT GT3	41	(Switzerland) Jonathan Hirschi	3
(Belgium) Marc VDS Racing Team	GT3 Pro	Ford GT GT3	41	(France) Antoine Leclerc	3
(Belgium) Marc VDS Racing Team	GT3 Pro	Alpina B6 GT3	41	(Belgium) Dylan Derdaele	5
(Belgium) Marc VDS Racing Team	GT3 Pro	Alpina B6 GT3	41	(France) Dino Lunardi	5
(Belgium) Marc VDS Racing Team	GT3 Pro	Alpina B6 GT3	41	(Austria) Nikolaus Mayr-Melnhof	5
(Belgium) Marc VDS Racing Team	GT3 Pro-Am	Ford Mustang FR500 GT3	92	(Belgium) Éric Bachelart	3
(Belgium) Marc VDS Racing Team	GT3 Pro-Am	Ford Mustang FR500 GT3	92	(Belgium) Marc Duez	3
(Belgium) Marc VDS Racing Team	GT3 Pro-Am	Ford Mustang FR500 GT3	92	(Belgium) Jean-Michel Martin	3
(Netherlands) Faster Racing by DB Motorsport	GT3 Pro-Am	BMW Z4 GT3	43	(Netherlands) Jeroen de Boer	2–3
(Netherlands) Faster Racing by DB Motorsport	GT3 Pro-Am	BMW Z4 GT3	43	(Netherlands) Simon Knap	2–3
(Netherlands) Faster Racing by DB Motorsport	GT3 Pro-Am	BMW Z4 GT3	43	(Netherlands) David Hart	3
(Netherlands) Faster Racing by DB Motorsport	GT3 Pro-Am	BMW Z4 GT3	44	(United Kingdom) Archie Hamilton	3
(Netherlands) Faster Racing by DB Motorsport	GT3 Pro-Am	BMW Z4 GT3	44	(Netherlands) Harrie Kolen	3
(Netherlands) Faster Racing by DB Motorsport	GT3 Pro-Am	BMW Z4 GT3	44	(Netherlands) Xavier Maassen	3
(Netherlands) Faster Racing by DB Motorsport	GT3 Pro-Am	BMW Z4 GT3	44	(Netherlands) Hoevert Vos	3
(United Arab Emirates) Gulf Racing	GT3 Pro-Am	Lamborghini Gallardo GT3	45	(France) Fabien Giroix	2–5
(United Arab Emirates) Gulf Racing	GT3 Pro-Am	Lamborghini Gallardo GT3	45	(Belgium) Andrea Barlesi	2–5
(United Arab Emirates) Gulf Racing	GT3 Pro-Am	Lamborghini Gallardo GT3	45	(France) Jean-Pierre Valentini	2
(United Arab Emirates) Gulf Racing	GT3 Pro-Am	Lamborghini Gallardo GT3	45	(United Arab Emirates) Karim Al Azhari	3
(United Arab Emirates) Gulf Racing	GT3 Pro-Am	Lamborghini Gallardo GT3	45	(France) Frédéric Fatien	3–5
(Switzerland) Black Bull Swiss Racing	GT3 Pro-Am	Ferrari 430 Scuderia GT3	46	(Italy) Andrea Invernizzi	1
(Switzerland) Black Bull Swiss Racing	GT3 Pro-Am	Ferrari 430 Scuderia GT3	46	(Italy) Mirko Venturi	1
(Switzerland) Black Bull Swiss Racing	GT3 Pro-Am	Ferrari 430 Scuderia GT3	46	(Italy) Tommaso Maino	1
(Italy) AF Corse	GT3 Pro-Am	Ferrari 458 Italia GT3	50	(Republic of Ireland) Matt Griffin	All
(Italy) AF Corse	GT3 Pro-Am	Ferrari 458 Italia GT3	50	(South Africa) Jack Gerber	1–4
(Italy) AF Corse	GT3 Pro-Am	Ferrari 458 Italia GT3	50	(Italy) Niki Cadei	3
(Italy) AF Corse	GT3 Pro-Am	Ferrari 458 Italia GT3	50	(Italy) Marco Cioci	3, 5
(Italy) AF Corse	GT3 Pro-Am	Ferrari 458 Italia GT3	50	(Italy) Piergiuseppe Perazzini	5
(Italy) AF Corse	GT3 Pro-Am	Ferrari 458 Italia GT3	51	(France) Jean-Marc Bachelier	3, 5
(Italy) AF Corse	GT3 Pro-Am	Ferrari 458 Italia GT3	51	(United States) Howard Blank	3, 5
(Italy) AF Corse	GT3 Pro-Am	Ferrari 458 Italia GT3	51	(France) Yannick Mallégol	3, 5
(Italy) AF Corse	GT3 Pro-Am	Ferrari 458 Italia GT3	51	(Switzerland) Maurizio Basso	4
(Italy) AF Corse	GT3 Pro-Am	Ferrari 458 Italia GT3	51	(Switzerland) Gino Forgione	4
(Italy) AF Corse	GT3 Pro-Am	Ferrari 458 Italia GT3	51	(Italy) Massimiliano Mugelli	4
(France) Graff Racing	GT3 Pro-Am	Mercedes-Benz SLS AMG GT3	54	(France) Eric Debard	3
(France) Graff Racing	GT3 Pro-Am	Mercedes-Benz SLS AMG GT3	54	(France) Grégoire Demoustier	3
(France) Graff Racing	GT3 Pro-Am	Mercedes-Benz SLS AMG GT3	54	(France) Nicolas Lapierre	3
(France) Graff Racing	GT3 Pro-Am	Mercedes-Benz SLS AMG GT3	54	(France) Olivier Panis	3
(France) Graff Racing	GT3 Pro-Am	Mercedes-Benz SLS AMG GT3	55	(France) Philippe Haezebrouck	3
(France) Graff Racing	GT3 Pro-Am	Mercedes-Benz SLS AMG GT3	55	(France) Mike Parisy	3
(France) Graff Racing	GT3 Pro-Am	Mercedes-Benz SLS AMG GT3	55	(France) Gilles Vannelet	3
(France) Graff Racing	GT3 Pro-Am	Mercedes-Benz SLS AMG GT3	55	(Italy) Massimo Vignali	3
(France) RMS	GT3 Gentlemen Trophy	Porsche 997 GT3 Cup	56	(Monaco) Marc Faggionato	3
(France) RMS	GT3 Gentlemen Trophy	Porsche 997 GT3 Cup	56	(France) Thierry Prignaud	3
(France) RMS	GT3 Gentlemen Trophy	Porsche 997 GT3 Cup	56	(France) Franck Racinet	3
(France) RMS	GT3 Gentlemen Trophy	Porsche 997 GT3 Cup	56	(France) Thierry Stépec	3
(France) RMS	GT3 Gentlemen Trophy	Porsche 997 GT3 Cup	57	(France) Olivier Baron	3
(France) RMS	GT3 Gentlemen Trophy	Porsche 997 GT3 Cup	57	(Switzerland) Richard Feller	3
(France) RMS	GT3 Gentlemen Trophy	Porsche 997 GT3 Cup	57	(Switzerland) Manuel Nicolaïdis	3
(France) RMS	GT3 Gentlemen Trophy	Porsche 997 GT3 Cup	57	(Switzerland) Fabio Spirgi	3
(United Kingdom) McLaren GT	GT3 Pro	McLaren MP4-12C GT3	58	(United Kingdom) Robert Bell	3
(United Kingdom) McLaren GT	GT3 Pro	McLaren MP4-12C GT3	58	(United Kingdom) Chris Goodwin	3
(United Kingdom) McLaren GT	GT3 Pro	McLaren MP4-12C GT3	58	(United Kingdom) Tim Mullen	3
(United Kingdom) McLaren GT	GT3 Pro	McLaren MP4-12C GT3	59	(United Kingdom) Andrew Kirkaldy	3–4
(United Kingdom) McLaren GT	GT3 Pro	McLaren MP4-12C GT3	59	(Portugal) Álvaro Parente	3–5
(United Kingdom) McLaren GT	GT3 Pro	McLaren MP4-12C GT3	59	(United Kingdom) Oliver Turvey	3–5
(United Kingdom) McLaren GT	GT3 Pro	McLaren MP4-12C GT3	59	(United Kingdom) Danny Watts	5
(United Kingdom) McLaren GT	GT3 Pro-Am	McLaren MP4-12C GT3	60	(United Kingdom) Adam Christodoulou	3–5
(United Kingdom) McLaren GT	GT3 Pro-Am	McLaren MP4-12C GT3	60	(United Kingdom) Phil Quaife	3, 5
(United Kingdom) McLaren GT	GT3 Pro-Am	McLaren MP4-12C GT3	60	(United Kingdom) Glynn Geddie	3
(United Kingdom) McLaren GT	GT3 Pro-Am	McLaren MP4-12C GT3	60	(New Zealand) Roger Wills	3
(United Kingdom) McLaren GT	GT3 Pro-Am	McLaren MP4-12C GT3	60	(Netherlands) Klaas Hummel	4–5
(United Kingdom) McLaren GT	GT3 Pro-Am	McLaren MP4-12C GT3	60	(Germany) Pierre Kaffer	4
(United Kingdom) Lotus Driving Academy	GT4	Lotus Evora GT4	61	(Austria) Stefan Landmann	1
(United Kingdom) Lotus Driving Academy	GT4	Lotus Evora GT4	61	(Hungary) Csaba Walter	1
(United Kingdom) Lotus Driving Academy	GT4	Lotus Evora GT4	61	(Austria) Florian Aichinger	1
(United Kingdom) Lotus Driving Academy	GT4	Lotus Evora GT4	61	(Switzerland) Lorenz Frey	2, 4
(United Kingdom) Lotus Driving Academy	GT4	Lotus Evora GT4	61	(Switzerland) Rolf Maritz	2, 4
(United Kingdom) Lotus Driving Academy	GT4	Lotus Evora GT4	61	(Switzerland) Fredy Barth	2, 4
(United Kingdom) Lotus Driving Academy	GT4	Lotus Evora GT4	62	(Switzerland) Andrina Gugger	4
(United Kingdom) Lotus Driving Academy	GT4	Lotus Evora GT4	62	(Austria) Matthias Gamauf	4
(United Kingdom) RJN Motorsport	GT4	Nissan 370Z GT4	63	(United Kingdom) Alex Buncombe	All
(United Kingdom) RJN Motorsport	GT4	Nissan 370Z GT4	63	(France) Jordan Tresson	All
(United Kingdom) RJN Motorsport	GT4	Nissan 370Z GT4	63	(United Kingdom) Christopher Ward	All
(Switzerland) AutoVitesse	GT3 Pro-Am	Lamborghini Gallardo LP600 GT3	64	(France) Julien Piguet	4
(Switzerland) AutoVitesse	GT3 Pro-Am	Lamborghini Gallardo LP600 GT3	64	(Switzerland) Cédric Leimer	4
(Switzerland) Gentle Swiss Racing	GT4	Aston Martin V8 Vantage GT4	64	(Switzerland) Lorenz Frey	1
(Switzerland) Gentle Swiss Racing	GT4	Aston Martin V8 Vantage GT4	64	(Switzerland) Rolf Maritz	1
(Switzerland) Gentle Swiss Racing	GT4	Aston Martin V8 Vantage GT4	64	(Switzerland) Fredy Barth	1
(Switzerland) Gentle Swiss Racing	GT4	Maserati GranTurismo MC	65	(Switzerland) Andrina Gugger	1–2
(Switzerland) Gentle Swiss Racing	GT4	Maserati GranTurismo MC	65	(Switzerland) Devis Schwägli	1–2
(Italy) Lotus Italia Scuderia Giudici	GT4	Lotus Evora GT4	70	(Italy) Edoardo Piscopo	All
(Italy) Lotus Italia Scuderia Giudici	GT4	Lotus Evora GT4	70	(United Kingdom) Leo Mansell	All
(Italy) Lotus Italia Scuderia Giudici	GT4	Lotus Evora GT4	70	(United Kingdom) Greg Mansell	All
(Italy) Lotus Italia Scuderia Giudici	GT4	Lotus Evora GT4	70	(Italy) Gianni Giudici	3
(Belgium) Prospeed Competition	GT3 Pro-Am	Porsche 997 GT3-R	74	(Belgium) Nicolas de Crem	3
(Belgium) Prospeed Competition	GT3 Pro-Am	Porsche 997 GT3-R	74	(United States) Bryce Miller	3
(Belgium) Prospeed Competition	GT3 Pro-Am	Porsche 997 GT3-R	74	(Belgium) Ludovic Sougnez	3
(Belgium) Prospeed Competition	GT3 Pro-Am	Porsche 997 GT3-R	74	(Netherlands) Paul van Splunteren	3
(Belgium) Prospeed Competition	GT3 Pro	Porsche 997 GT3-R	75	(Belgium) Marc Goossens	3
(Belgium) Prospeed Competition	GT3 Pro	Porsche 997 GT3-R	75	(Belgium) Jan Heylen	3
(Belgium) Prospeed Competition	GT3 Pro	Porsche 997 GT3-R	75	(Belgium) Maxime Soulet	3
(Germany) Need for Speed Team Schubert	GT3 Pro	BMW Z4 GT3	76	(Germany) Claudia Hürtgen	3
(Germany) Need for Speed Team Schubert	GT3 Pro	BMW Z4 GT3	76	(Sweden) Edward Sandström	3
(Germany) Need for Speed Team Schubert	GT3 Pro	BMW Z4 GT3	76	(Germany) Dirk Werner	3
(United Kingdom) Ecurie Ecosse	GT3 Pro-Am	Aston Martin DBRS9	79	(United Kingdom) Oliver Bryant	3
(United Kingdom) Ecurie Ecosse	GT3 Pro-Am	Aston Martin DBRS9	79	(United Kingdom) Alasdair McCaig	3
(United Kingdom) Ecurie Ecosse	GT3 Pro-Am	Aston Martin DBRS9	79	(United Kingdom) Andrew Smith	3
(United Kingdom) Ecurie Ecosse	GT3 Pro-Am	Aston Martin DBRS9	79	(United Kingdom) Joe Twyman	3
(France) SMG	GT3 Pro-Am	Porsche 997 GT3-R	80	(France) Eric Clément	4
(France) SMG	GT3 Pro-Am	Porsche 997 GT3-R	80	(France) Philippe Gache	4
(France) Exagon Engineering	GT3 Pro-Am	Porsche 997 GT3-R	81	(France) Daniel Desbruères	4
(France) Exagon Engineering	GT3 Pro-Am	Porsche 997 GT3-R	81	(Belgium) Christian Kelders	4
(France) GCR	GT3 Gentlemen Trophy	Dodge Viper GT3	82	(France) Guy Clairay	3
(France) GCR	GT3 Gentlemen Trophy	Dodge Viper GT3	82	(France) Jean-Marc Merlin	3
(France) GCR	GT3 Gentlemen Trophy	Dodge Viper GT3	82	(France) Dominique Nury	3
(France) GCR	GT3 Gentlemen Trophy	Dodge Viper GT3	82	(France) Bernard Salam	3
(Belgium) VDS Racing Adventures	GT3 Gentlemen Trophy	Ford Mustang FR500 GT3	85	(Belgium) Benjamin Bailly	3
(Belgium) VDS Racing Adventures	GT3 Gentlemen Trophy	Ford Mustang FR500 GT3	85	(Belgium) José Close	3
(Belgium) VDS Racing Adventures	GT3 Gentlemen Trophy	Ford Mustang FR500 GT3	85	(Belgium) Julien Schroyen	3
(Belgium) VDS Racing Adventures	GT3 Gentlemen Trophy	Ford Mustang FR500 GT3	85	(Belgium) Raphaël van der Straten	3
(United Kingdom) Team Preci Spark	GT3 Pro-Am	Mercedes-Benz SLS AMG GT3	90	(United Kingdom) David Jones	3, 5
(United Kingdom) Team Preci Spark	GT3 Pro-Am	Mercedes-Benz SLS AMG GT3	90	(United Kingdom) Godfrey Jones	3, 5
(United Kingdom) Team Preci Spark	GT3 Pro-Am	Mercedes-Benz SLS AMG GT3	90	(United Kingdom) Mike Jordan	3
(Germany) Audi Sport Team Phoenix	GT3 Pro	Audi R8 LMS	98	(Switzerland) Marcel Fässler	3
(Germany) Audi Sport Team Phoenix	GT3 Pro	Audi R8 LMS	98	(Italy) Andrea Piccini	3
(Germany) Audi Sport Team Phoenix	GT3 Pro	Audi R8 LMS	98	(Germany) Mike Rockenfeller	3
(Germany) Audi Sport Team Phoenix	GT3 Pro	Audi R8 LMS	99	(Germany) Marc Basseng	3
(Germany) Audi Sport Team Phoenix	GT3 Pro	Audi R8 LMS	99	(Germany) Christopher Haase	3
(Germany) Audi Sport Team Phoenix	GT3 Pro	Audi R8 LMS	99	(Germany) Frank Stippler	3
(Belgium) DVB Racing	GT4	BMW M3 GT4	100	(Germany) Wolfgang Haugg	3
(Belgium) DVB Racing	GT4	BMW M3 GT4	100	(Belgium) Christophe Legrand	3
(Belgium) DVB Racing	GT4	BMW M3 GT4	100	(Italy) Giuseppe de Pasquale	3–5
(Belgium) DVB Racing	GT4	BMW M3 GT4	100	(Italy) Raffaele Sangiuolo	3–5
(Belgium) Speedlover	GT4	Aston Martin V8 Vantage GT4	103	(Belgium) Peter van Audenhove	3
(Belgium) Speedlover	GT4	Aston Martin V8 Vantage GT4	103	(France) Christoff Bigourie	3
(Belgium) Speedlover	GT4	Aston Martin V8 Vantage GT4	103	(Belgium) Sven van Laere	3
(Belgium) Speedlover	GT4	Aston Martin V8 Vantage GT4	103	(Belgium) René Marin	3
(Belgium) Speedlover	GT3 Gentlemen Trophy	Porsche 997 GT3 Cup	104	(Belgium) Michel de Coster	3
(Belgium) Speedlover	GT3 Gentlemen Trophy	Porsche 997 GT3 Cup	104	(Netherlands) Tom Langeberg	3
(Belgium) Speedlover	GT3 Gentlemen Trophy	Porsche 997 GT3 Cup	104	(Belgium) Rik Renmans	3
(Belgium) Speedlover	GT3 Gentlemen Trophy	Porsche 997 GT3 Cup	104	(Netherlands) Oskar Slingerland	3
(Belgium) Signa Motorsport	GT3 Gentlemen Trophy	Dodge Viper GT3	116	(Belgium) Patrick Chaillet	3
(Belgium) Signa Motorsport	GT3 Gentlemen Trophy	Dodge Viper GT3	116	(Belgium) Benoit Galand	3
(Belgium) Signa Motorsport	GT3 Gentlemen Trophy	Dodge Viper GT3	116	(Belgium) Christophe Geoffroy	3
(Belgium) Signa Motorsport	GT3 Gentlemen Trophy	Dodge Viper GT3	116	(Belgium) Thierry de Latre du Bosqueau	3
(Belgium) Mühlner Motorsport	GT3 Pro-Am	Porsche 997 GT3-R	123	(Belgium) Armand Fumal	3
(Belgium) Mühlner Motorsport	GT3 Pro-Am	Porsche 997 GT3-R	123	(Belgium) Christian Lefort	3
(Belgium) Mühlner Motorsport	GT3 Pro-Am	Porsche 997 GT3-R	123	(Sweden) Carl Rosenblad	3
(Belgium) Mühlner Motorsport	GT3 Pro-Am	Porsche 997 GT3-R	123	(Belgium) Jérôme Thiry	3
(Belgium) Mühlner Motorsport	GT3 Pro-Am	Porsche 997 GT3-R	124	(Germany) Sebastian Asch	3
(Belgium) Mühlner Motorsport	GT3 Pro-Am	Porsche 997 GT3-R	124	(Germany) Tim Bergmeister	3
(Belgium) Mühlner Motorsport	GT3 Pro-Am	Porsche 997 GT3-R	124	(Germany) Jochen Krumbach	3
(Belgium) Mühlner Motorsport	GT3 Pro-Am	Porsche 997 GT3-R	124	(United Kingdom) Martin Rich	3
(France) Freeman Gepa 161	GT3 Gentlemen Trophy	Porsche 997 GT3 Cup	161	(Belgium) Patrick Geladé	3
(France) Freeman Gepa 161	GT3 Gentlemen Trophy	Porsche 997 GT3 Cup	161	(Belgium) Didier Grandjean	3
(France) Freeman Gepa 161	GT3 Gentlemen Trophy	Porsche 997 GT3 Cup	161	(France) Pascal Muller	3
(France) Freeman Gepa 161	GT3 Gentlemen Trophy	Porsche 997 GT3 Cup	161	(Belgium) Dominique Sandona	3
(Germany) Haribo Team Manthey	GT3 Pro-Am	Porsche 997 GT3-R	888	(Germany) Christian Menzel	3
(Germany) Haribo Team Manthey	GT3 Pro-Am	Porsche 997 GT3-R	888	(Germany) Hans Guido Riegel	3
(Germany) Haribo Team Manthey	GT3 Pro-Am	Porsche 997 GT3-R	888	(Germany) Mike Stursberg	3
(Germany) Haribo Team Manthey	GT3 Pro-Am	Porsche 997 GT3-R	888	(United Kingdom) Richard Westbrook	3

== Results and standings ==
=== Race results ===
Event	Circuit	GT3 Pro Cup Winner	GT3 Pro / Am Cup Winner	GT3 Citation Cup Winner	GT4 Cup Winner
1	Monza	No. 9 AutOrlando Sport	No. 24 Blancpain Reiter	No. 31 Ruffier Racing	No. 70 Lotus Italia Scuderia Giudici
1	Monza	(Italy) Gianluca Roda (Italy) Raffaele Giammaria (Italy) Paolo Ruberti	(Netherlands) Peter Kox (Switzerland) Marc Hayek	(France) Georges Cabannes (France) Grégory Guilvert	(Italy) Edoardo Piscopo (United Kingdom) Greg Mansell (United Kingdom) Leo Mansell
2	Navarra	No. 1 Vita4One	No. 20 SOFREV Auto Sport Promotion	No. 31 Ruffier Racing	No. 61 Lotus Driving Academy
2	Navarra	(Germany) Frank Kechele (Belgium) Nico Verdonck (Germany) Michael Bartels	(France) Franck Morel (France) Jean-Luc Beaubelique (France) Ludovic Badey	(France) Georges Cabannes (France) Fabien Michal	(Switzerland) Lorenz Frey (Switzerland) Rolf Maritz (Switzerland) Fredy Barth
3	Spa-Francorchamps; Report	No. 33 Audi Sport Team WRT	No. 20 SOFREV Auto Sport Promotion	No. 19 Level Racing	No. 63 RJN Motorsport
3	Spa-Francorchamps; Report	(Belgium) Gregory Franchi (Germany) Timo Scheider (Sweden) Mattias Ekström	(France) Franck Morel (France) Jean-Luc Beaubélique (France) Ludovic Badey (France) Guillaume Moreau	(Belgium) Philippe Broodcoren (Belgium) Christoff Corten (Belgium) Kurt Dujardin (Netherlands) Mathijs Herkema	(France) Jordan Tresson (United Kingdom) Christopher Ward (United Kingdom) Alex Buncombe
4	Magny-Cours	No. 40 Marc VDS Racing Team	No. 2 Vita4One	No. 31 Ruffier Racing	No. 63 RJN Motorsport
4	Magny-Cours	(Belgium) Bas Leinders (Belgium) Maxime Martin (Finland) Markus Palttala	(Netherlands) Niek Hommerson (Belgium) Louis Machiels (Netherlands) Paul van Splunteren	(France) Georges Cabannes (France) Fabien Michal (France) Grégory Guilvert	(France) Jordan Tresson (United Kingdom) Christopher Ward (United Kingdom) Alex Buncombe
5	Silverstone	No. 40 Marc VDS Racing Team	No. 2 Vita4One	No. 22 Comole Racing	No. 70 Lotus Italia Scuderia Giudici
5	Silverstone	(Belgium) Bas Leinders (Belgium) Maxime Martin (Finland) Markus Palttala	(Netherlands) Niek Hommerson (Belgium) Louis Machiels (Germany) Michael Bartels	(France) Lionel Comole (United Kingdom) Robert Hissom (United Kingdom) Chris Dymond	(Italy) Edoardo Piscopo (United Kingdom) Greg Mansell (United Kingdom) Leo Mansell
