= Mirko Venturi =

Italian racing driver (born 1981)

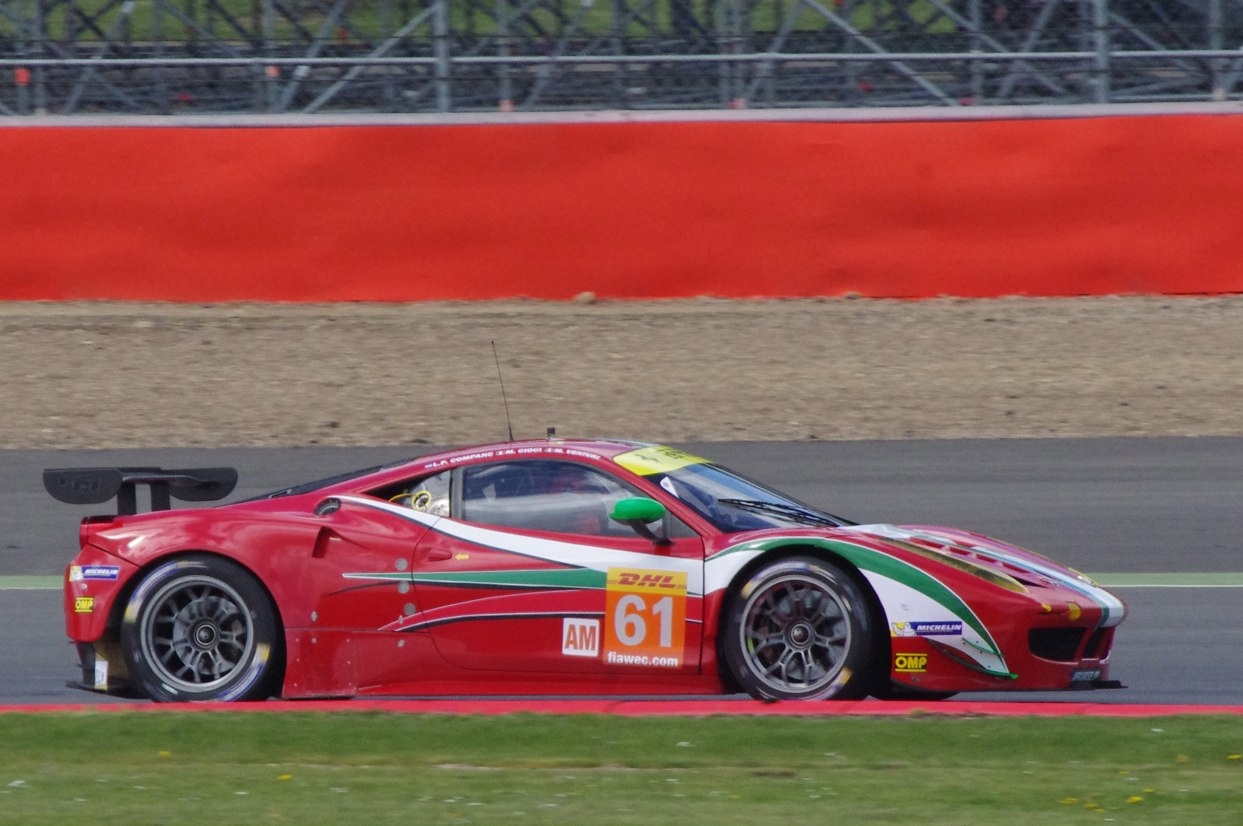
- Venturi in 2014
- Nationality: (Italy) Italian
- Born: 1 May 1981 (age 45) Albinea, Italy
- Categorisation: FIA Gold (until 2013, 2015–2019); FIA Silver (2014)

Championship titles
- 2016 2010: Italian GT Championship – Super GT3; Lamborghini Super Trofeo Europe – Pro

Mirko Venturi (born 1 May 1981) is an Italian racing driver who last competed in the Italian GT Championship for Black Bull Swiss Racing.

== Career ==
Venturi began his racing career in 1999, racing in Formula Renault Campus Italy. After two years in Formula Renault 2000 Italia for Drumel Motorsport, Venturi drove for Opel Team KMS in the first three rounds of the German Formula Three Championship in 2002, taking a best result of 13th at the Sachsenring. During 2002, Venturi also made his sportscar debut, racing in the first two rounds of the FIA Sportscar Championship for Durango Corse in the SR1 class, taking a best result of sixth at Barcelona.

Following one-off appearances in the Italian Superturismo Championship in 2005 and 2006, Venturi made further one-off appearances in Porsche Carrera Cup Italy and the Italian Touring Endurance Championship in 2008. The following year, Venturi made select appearances in Lamborghini Super Trofeo Europe for Puresport. Remaining in Super Trofeo Europe for 2010 with Black Bull Swiss Racing, Venturi clinched the Pro title in his only full-time season in the series.

Continuing with Black Bull Swiss Racing in 2011, Venturi raced with them in the inaugural round of the Blancpain Endurance Series at Monza, qualifying his Ferrari F430 on pole and finishing sixth overall and third in GT3 Pro-Am. The following year, Venturi raced in all but one rounds of the Endurance Champions Cup for the same team, finishing runner-up in the Gold Cup standings. During 2012, Venturi also made raced in the Pro-Am class of the Blancpain Endurance Series at the Monza and Le Castellet rounds. Continuing with Black Bull Swiss Racing for 2013, Venturi raced with them in the Italian GT Championship, taking three wins as he ended the year third in the GT3 standings.

In 2014, Venturi joined AF Corse to race a Ferrari 458 Italia GT2 in the LMGTE Am class of the FIA World Endurance Championship alongside Marco Cioci and Luis Pérez Companc. Racing in the first four rounds before leaving the team ahead of Fuji, Venturi won at Spa en route to a sixth-place points finish in points. In parallel, Venturi raced in the LMGTE class of the European Le Mans Series for the same team at Imola, and for AT Racing at Le Castellet, where he finished second. During 2014, Venturi also raced at the 12 Hours of Sebring for Spirit of Race, as well as making a one-off appearance in International GT Open for Black Bull Swiss Racing at the Nürburgring. The following year, Venturi raced in select rounds of the Italian GT Championship for BMS Scuderia Italia, taking a lone win in race two at Imola.

Returning to Black Bull Swiss Racing for 2016, Venturi raced with them in the Super GT3 class of the Italian GT Championship alongside Stefano Gai. Starting off the season with wins at Monza and Misano, the Ferrari 488 GT3 crew then scored further wins at Imola and Mugello to take the title. Venturi remained with the team for 2017, racing in select rounds of the Italian GT Championship, winning both races at Imola and race one at Vallelunga to end the year ninth in the Super GT3 Pro standings.

== Karting record ==
=== Karting career summary ===
Season	Series	Team	Position
1991	Torneo Delle Industrie – 60 Minikart		16th
1992	Torneo Delle Industrie – K60 Minikart		6th
1993	Torneo Delle Industrie – Minikart		2nd
1994	Torneo Delle Industrie – 100 Junior		1st
1995	Trofeo Andrea Margutti – 100 Junior		6th
1995	Torneo Delle Industrie – 100 Junior		10th
1996	Trofeo Andrea Margutti – 100 Junior		20th
1998	Karting World Championship – Formula A		29th

== Racing record ==
=== Racing career summary ===
Season	Series	Team	Races	Wins	Poles	F/Laps	Podiums	Points	Position
1999	Formula Renault Campus Italy								**3rd**
2000	Formula Renault 2000 Italia	Drumel Motorsport	10	0	0	0	3	82	7th
2001	Formula Renault 2000 Italia	Drumel Motorsport	10	1	1	1	4	140	4th
2002	German Formula Three Championship	Opel Team KMS	4	0	0	0	0	0	34th
2002	FIA Sportscar Championship – SR1	Durango Corse	2	0	0	0	0	6	23rd
2006	Italian Superturismo Championship	Zerocinque Motorsport	2	0	0	0	1	6	15th
2008	Porsche Carrera Cup Italy	Centro Porsche Padova	2	0	0	0	0	0	NC
2008	Italian Touring Endurance Championship	W&D Racing	2	0	0	0	0	11	20th
2008	Italian GT Championship – GTC	Ciesse Motorsport	2	0	0	0	0	0	NC
2009	Lamborghini Super Trofeo Europe – Pro	Puresport	3	0	1	3	0	4	14th
2009	24H Series – A4	PB Racing	1	1	0	0	1	0	NC
2010	Lamborghini Super Trofeo Europe – Pro	Black Bull Swiss Racing							**1st**
2010	6 Hours of Vallelunga	Black Bull Swiss Racing	1	0	0	0	0	—N/a	DNF
2011	Winter Series by GT Sport – GTS	Black Bull Swiss Racing	6	0	0	3	0	0	NC
2011	Blancpain Endurance Series – GT3 Pro-Am	Black Bull Swiss Racing	1	0	1	1	1	15	16th
2011	Belcar Endurance Championship	Black Bull Swiss Racing	1	0	0	0	0	0	NC
2012	Winter Series by GT Sport – GTS	Black Bull Swiss Racing	2	0	0	0	0	0	NC
2012	Endurance Champions Cup – Gold	Black Bull Swiss Racing	3	0	0	0	2	19	**2nd**
2012	Blancpain Endurance Series – Pro-Am	Black Bull Swiss Racing	2	0	1	1	0	0	NC
2013	Winter Series by GT Sport – GTS	Black Bull Racing	2	1	1	0	1	0	NC
2013	Italian GT Championship – GT3	Black Bull Racing	14	3	6	7	5	123	**3rd**
2014	United SportsCar Championship – GTD	Spirit of Race	1	0	0	0	0	18	88th
2014	FIA World Endurance Championship – LMGTE Am	AF Corse	4	1	1	0	2	76	6th
2014	24 Hours of Le Mans – LMGTE Am	AF Corse	1	0	0	0	1	—N/a	**3rd**
2014	European Le Mans Series – LMGTE	AF Corse	1	0	0	0	0	24	13th
2014	European Le Mans Series – LMGTE	AT Racing	1	0	0	0	1	24	13th
2014	International GT Open – Super GT	Black Bull Swiss Racing	1	0	0	0	0	3	14th
2015	Italian GT Championship – GT3	BMS Scuderia Italia	6	1	1	1	2	43	13th
2016	Italian GT Championship – Super GT3	Black Bull Swiss Racing	14	4	2	3	7	147	**1st**
2017	Italian GT Championship – Super GT3 Pro	Black Bull Swiss Racing	6	3	0	0	4	80	9th

==== GT World Challenge Europe Endurance Cup ====
(key) (Races in bold indicate pole position) (Races in italics indicate fastest lap)

Year	Team	Car	Class	1	2	3	4	5	6	7	8	Pos.	Points
2011	Black Bull Swiss Racing	Ferrari 430 Scuderia GT3	GT3 Pro-Am	**MNZ**; 6	NAV	SPA; 6H	SPA; 12H	SPA; 24H	MAG	SIL		16th	15
2012	Black Bull Swiss Racing	Ferrari 458 Italia GT3	Pro-Am	MNZ; 22	SIL	**LEC**; Ret	SPA; 6H	SPA; 12H	SPA; 24H	NÜR	NAV	NC	0

=== Complete IMSA SportsCar Championship results ===
(key) (Races in bold indicate pole position; races in italics indicate fastest lap)

Year	Entrant	Class	Make	Engine	1	2	3	4	5	6	7	8	9	10	11	Rank	Points
2014	Spirit of Race	GTD	Ferrari 458 Italia GT3	Ferrari 4.5 L V8	DAY	SEB; 14	LAG	DET	WGL	MOS	IMS	ELK	VIR	COA	PET	88th	18

=== Complete FIA World Endurance Championship results ===
(key) (Races in bold indicate pole position; races in italics indicate fastest lap)

Year	Entrant	Class	Chassis	Engine	1	2	3	4	5	6	7	8	Rank	Points
2014	AF Corse	LMGTE Am	Ferrari 458 Italia GT2	Ferrari F142 4.5L V8	SIL; 6	**SPA**; 1	LMS; 3	COA; 4	FUJ	SHA	BHR	SÃO	6th	76

=== 24 Hours of Le Mans results ===
Year	Team	Co-Drivers	Car	Class	Laps	Pos.	Class Pos.
2014	(Italy) AF Corse	(Italy) Marco Cioci (Argentina) Luis Pérez Companc	Ferrari 458 Italia GT2	GTE; Am	331	22nd	**3rd**

=== Complete European Le Mans Series results ===
(key) (Races in bold indicate pole position; results in italics indicate fastest lap)

Year	Entrant	Class	Chassis	Engine	1	2	3	4	5	Rank	Points
2014	AF Corse	LMGTE	Ferrari 458 Italia GT2	Ferrari 4.5 L V8	SIL	IMO; 7	RBR			13th	24
2014	AT Racing	LMGTE	Ferrari 458 Italia GT2	Ferrari 4.5 L V8				LEC; 2	EST	13th	24
