= Markus Palttala =

Finnish racing driver (born 1977)

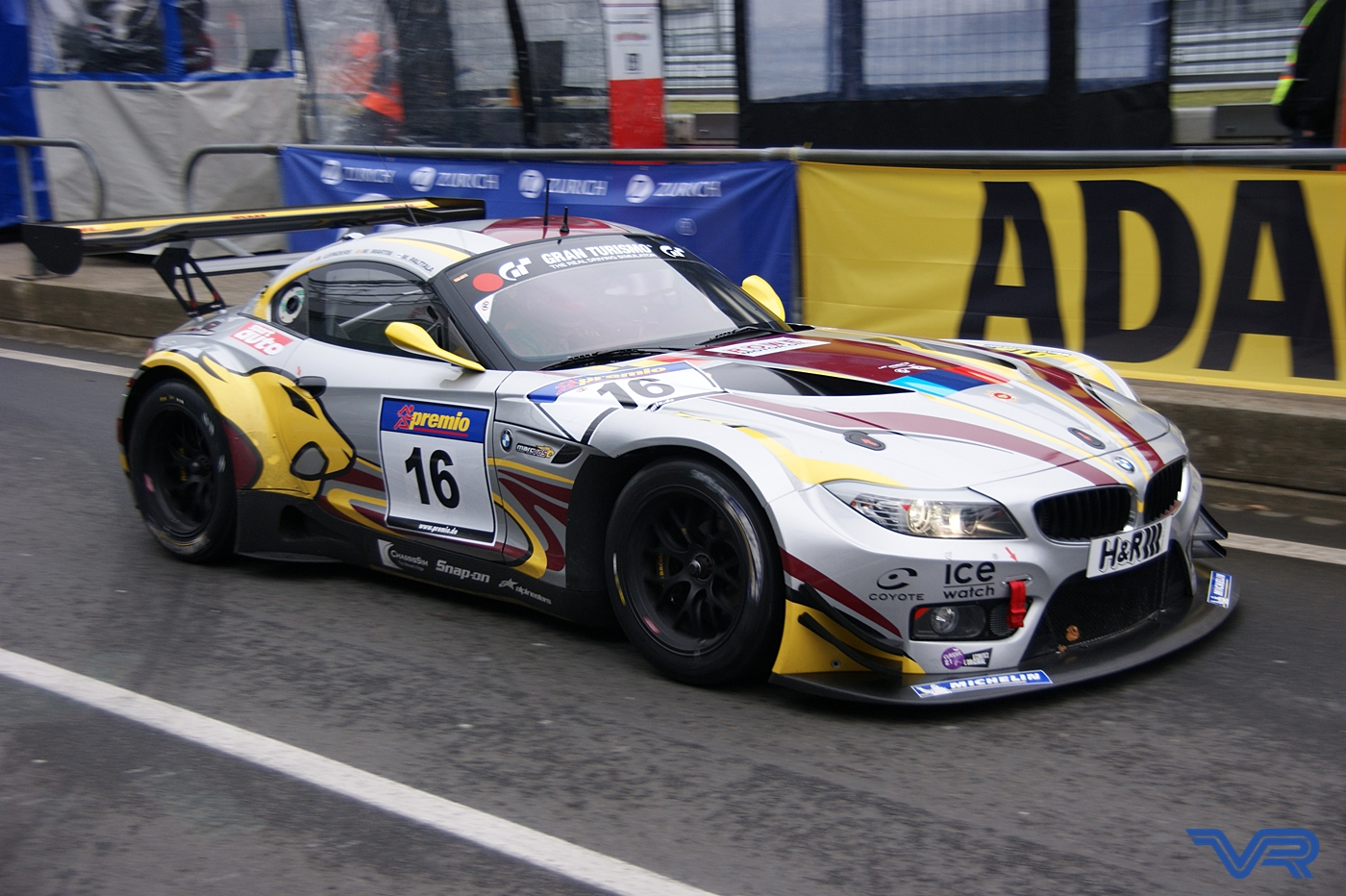
- Nationality: (Finland) Finnish
- Born: Markus Eero Johannes Palttala; 16 August 1977 (age 49) Nakkila, Finland

United SportsCar Championship career
- Debut season: 2014
- Current team: Turner Motorsport
- Categorisation: FIA Silver (until 2014, 2023–); FIA Gold (2015–2022)
- Starts: 4
- Wins: 2

Previous series
- 1998–1999 1999 2000 2001 2002, '06, '08, '09 2003, 2006 2005–2010 2005, '08, '11 2009–2011 2009 2010–2011 2011–2013 2012–2013: Finnish TCC; Dunlop Tourenwagen Cup Light; Porsche Carrera Cup Germany; European Super Production; FIA GT Championship; FFSA GT Championship; Le Mans Endurance Series; Belcar; FIA GT3; Finnish GT3 Championship; FIA GT1 World Championship; Blancpain Endurance Series; FIA WEC
24 Hours of Le Mans career
- Years: 2010, 2012, 2014
- Teams: Marc VDS Racing Team, JWA-Avila
- Best finish: 33rd (2012)

Markus Eero Johannes Palttala (born 16 August 1977 in Nakkila) is a Finnish racing driver. After racing in karts, Palttala began racing cars in the Finnish Touring Car Championship in 1998. He competed in the 2001 European Super Production Championship, driving a Honda Integra. Palttala's first run in Grand Touring cars came in 2000 in the single-make Porsche Carrera Cup Germany. He moved to the FIA GT Championship beginning in 2002, competing sporadically in 2006, 2008, and 2009, and also competed in its successor championships, the FIA GT1 World Championship and FIA GT3 European Championship through 2011. Palttala's best seasons came in 2011 and 2012 in the Blancpain Endurance Series, where he finished second in the championship each year, driving for Marc VDS Racing Team.

Palttala drove in the Le Mans Endurance Series for various teams from 2005 until 2010. In the 2010 season, he won the GT1 class at the 1000 km of Spa and participated in the 24 Hours of Le Mans. He ran the FIA World Endurance Championship in 2012 (including another outing at Le Mans) and 2013. Palttala joined Turner Motorsport for the inaugural United SportsCar Championship season in 2014. He took his first GT-Daytona class win in the third race of the season at Mazda Raceway Laguna Seca, and followed it up with a dominating win at the Six Hours of Watkins Glen.

== Complete motorsports results ==
=== 24 Hours of Le Mans results ===
Year	Team	Co-Drivers	Car	Class	Laps	Pos.	Class Pos.
2010	(Belgium) Marc VDS Racing Team	(Belgium) Eric De Doncker (Belgium) Bas Leinders	Ford GT1	LMGT1	26	DNF	DNF
2012	(United Kingdom) JWA-Avila	(United Kingdom) Paul Daniels (Switzerland) Joël Camathias	Porsche 911 GT3 RSR	LMGTE-AM	290	33rd	8th
2014	(Belgium) Prospeed Competition	(France) François Perrodo (France) Emmanuel Collard	Porsche 911 GT3 RSR	LMGTE-AM	194	DNF	DNF

=== Complete WeatherTech SportsCar Championship results ===
(key) (Races in bold indicate pole position; results in italics indicate fastest lap)

Year	Team	Class	Make	Engine	1	2	3	4	5	6	7	8	9	10	11	12	Pos.	Points
2014	Turner Motorsport	GTD	BMW Z4 GT3	BMW 4.4 L V8	DAY; 7†	SEB; 7	LGA; 1	DET; 6	WGL; 1	MOS; 3	IND	ELK; 1	VIR; 1	COA; 3	ATL; 4		6th	287
2015	Turner Motorsport	GTD	BMW Z4 GT3	BMW 4.4 L V8	DAY; 12	SEB; 8	LGA; 10	BEL; 6	WGL; 9	LIM	ELK; 10†	VIR; 4	AUS; 2	ATL; 11			11th	200
2016	Turner Motorsport	GTD	BMW M6 GT3	BMW 4.4 L V8	DAY; 5	SEB; 7	LGA; 12	BEL; 11	WGL; 10	MOS; 13†	LIM; 7	ELK; 9	VIR; 8	AUS; 14	PET; 3		10th	237
2018	Turner Motorsport	GTD	BMW M6 GT3	BMW 4.4 L V8	DAY	SEB; 11	MOH	BEL	WGL; 1	MOS	LIM	ELK	VIR	LGA	PET; 15		20th	100
2021	NTE Sport	GTD	Audi R8 LMS Evo	Audi 5.2 L V10	DAY	SEB	MDO	DET	WGL; 4	WGL	LIM	ELK	LGA	LBH	VIR	PET	48th	299
2022	NTE Sport	GTD	Lamborghini Huracán GT3 Evo	Lamborghini 5.2 L V10	DAY; 16	SEB	LBH	LGA	MDO	DET	WGL	MOS	LIM	ELK	VIR	PET	66th	163

^{†} Palttala did not complete sufficient laps in order to score full points.

=== 24 Hours of Spa results ===
Year	Team	Co-Drivers	Car	Class	Laps	Pos.	Class Pos.
2000	(Belgium) PSI Motorsport	(Belgium) Stéphane De Groodt (Belgium) Éric Bachelart	Honda Integra Type-R	SP		DNF	DNF
2001	(Belgium) PSI Motorsport	(Belgium) Philippe Tollenaire (Belgium) Stéphane De Groodt	Porsche 996 GT3-R	Cat.2	499	10th	1st
2002	(Belgium) PSI Motorsport	(Belgium) Eric Geboers (Belgium) Kurt Mollekens	Porsche 996 Bi-Turbo	GT	312	DNF	DNF
2005	(Belgium) Ice Pol Racing Team	(Belgium) Yves Lambert (Belgium) Christian Lefort (Belgium) Jean André	Porsche 996 GT3-RS	G2	486	17th	4th
2006	(Belgium) PSI Experience	(Belgium) Bernard Dehez (Finland) Pertti Kuismanen (Belgium) Vincent Radermecker	Chevrolet Corvette C5-R	GT1	530	11th	7th
2008	(Belgium) Prospeed Competition	(Finland) Mikael Forsten (Germany) Wolf Henzler (Belgium) Geoffroy Horion	Porsche 997 GT3-RSR	GT2	183	DNF	DNF
2009	(Belgium) Prospeed Competition	(Austria) Niki Lanik (Belgium) David Loix (Netherlands) Oskar Slingerland	Porsche 997 GT3 Cup S	G3	517	9th	3rd
2010	(Belgium) Marc VDS Racing Team	(Belgium) Eric De Doncker (Belgium) Renaud Kuppens	Ford GT GT3	GT3	249	DNF	DNF
2011	(Belgium) Marc VDS Racing Team	(France) Antoine Leclerc (Switzerland) Jonathan Hirschi	Ford GT GT3	Pro Cup	521	11th	7th
2012	(Belgium) Marc VDS Racing Team	(Belgium) Bas Leinders (Belgium) Maxime Martin	BMW Z4 GT3	Pro Cup	507	4th	4th
2013	(Belgium) Marc VDS Racing Team	(Netherlands) Nick Catsburg (Switzerland) Henri Moser	BMW Z4 GT3	Pro Cup	222	DNF	DNF
2014	(Belgium) BMW Sports Trophy Team Marc VDS	(Germany) Lucas Luhr (Germany) Dirk Werner	BMW Z4 GT3	Pro Cup	527	2nd	2nd
2015	(Belgium) BMW Sports Trophy Team Marc VDS	(Netherlands) Nick Catsburg (Germany) Lucas Luhr	BMW Z4 GT3	Pro Cup	536	1st	1st
2016	(Switzerland) Emil Frey Racing	(Switzerland) Jonathan Hirschi (Austria) Christian Klien	Jaguar XK Emil Frey G3	Pro Cup	446	49th	25th
2017	(Germany) Walkenhorst Motorsport	(Finland) Matias Henkola (Norway) Christian Krognes (Germany) Nico Menzel	BMW M6 GT3	Pro-Am Cup	536	20th	5th
2018	(Switzerland) Emil Frey Racing	(Monaco) Stéphane Ortelli (Austria) Norbert Siedler	Lexus RC F GT3	Pro Cup	196	DNF	DNF
2019	(United Kingdom) Bentley Team M-Sport	(United Kingdom) Alex Buncombe (Belgium) Maxime Soulet	Bentley Continental GT3	Pro Cup	118	DNF	DNF

=== 24 Hours of Nürburgring results ===
Year	Team	Co-Drivers	Car	Class	Laps	Pos.	Class Pos.
2012	(Belgium) Marc VDS Racing Team	(Belgium) Bas Leinders (Belgium) Maxime Martin	BMW Z4 GT3	SP9 GT3	154	4th	4th
2013	(Belgium) Marc VDS Racing Team	(Sweden) Richard Göransson (Belgium) Bas Leinders (Switzerland) Henri Moser	BMW Z4 GT3	SP9 GT3	39	DNF	DNF
2014	(Belgium) BMW Sports Trophy Team Marc VDS	(Germany) Dirk Adorf (Netherlands) Nick Catsburg (Belgium) Bas Leinders	BMW Z4 GT3	SP9 GT3	60	DNF	DNF
2015	(Belgium) BMW Sports Trophy Team Marc VDS	(Germany) Lucas Luhr (Belgium) Maxime Martin (United Kingdom) Richard Westbrook	BMW Z4 GT3	SP9 GT3	156	**2nd**	**2nd**
2016	(Germany) Rowe Racing	(Netherlands) Nicky Catsburg (Germany) Klaus Graf (United Kingdom) Richard Westbrook	BMW M6 GT3	SP9 GT3	57	DNF	DNF
2017	(Germany) Rowe Racing	(Netherlands) Nick Catsburg (United Kingdom) Alexander Sims (United Kingdom) Richard Westbrook	BMW M6 GT3	SP9 GT3	158	2nd	2nd
2018	(Germany) BMW Team Schnitzer	(Brazil) Augusto Farfus (Germany) Christian Krognes (Germany) Fabian Schiller	BMW M6 GT3	SP9 GT3	131	13th	12th
2019	(Germany) GetSpeed Performance	(United States) Janine Hill (Germany) Fabian Schiller (United States) John Shoffner	Mercedes-AMG GT3	SP9 GT3	150	13th	12th
2020	(Germany) GetSpeed Performance	(United States) Janine Shoffner (United States) John Shoffner (Belgium) Maxime Soulet	Mercedes-AMG GT3 Evo	SP9 GT3	79	17th	16th
2021	(Germany) GetSpeed Performance	(Germany) Moritz Kranz (United States) John Shoffner (Belgium) Maxime Soulet	Mercedes-AMG GT3 Evo	SP9 GT3	58	14th	14th
2022	(Austria) KTM True Racing	(Austria) Reinhard Kofler (Austria) Ferdinand Stuck (Austria) Johannes Stuck	KTM X-Bow GT2 Concept	SP-X	144	20th	2nd

=== NASCAR ===
(key) (Bold – Pole position awarded by qualifying time. Italics – Pole position earned by points standings or practice time. * – Most laps led.)

==== Whelen Euro Series - Elite 1 ====
NASCAR Whelen Euro Series - Elite 1 results
Year	Team	No.	Make	1	2	3	4	5	6	7	8	9	10	11	12	NWES	Points
2014	Racing Club Partners – Marc VDS	46	Toyota	VAL	VAL	BRH; 8	BRH; 9	TOU	TOU	NUR; 6	NUR; 21	UMB	UMB	LEM	LEM	22nd	178

=== 24 Hours of Zolder results ===
Year	Team	Co-Drivers	Car	Class	Laps	Pos.	Class Pos.
2000	(Belgium) PSI Motorsport	(Belgium) Marc Goossens (Belgium) Philippe Tollenaire	Porsche 996 Bi-Turbo	GTA		DNF	DNF
2003	(Belgium) RTM Racing	(Belgium) Leo Van Sande (Finland) Risto Virtanen	Porsche 996 Bi-Turbo	GTA	165	DNF	DNF
2004	(Belgium) PSI Motorsport	(Belgium) Marc Duez (Belgium) Leo Van Sande	Porsche 996 Bi-Turbo	GTA	426	DNF	DNF
2005	(Belgium) PSI Motorsport	(Belgium) Kurt Mollekens (Belgium) Vincent Radermecker (Belgium) Leo Van Sande	Porsche 996 Bi-Turbo	GTA	746	7th	2nd
2007	(Belgium) G-Force Racing	(Belgium) Frank Hahn (Netherlands) Val Hillebrand (Belgium) Leo Van Sande	Porsche 997 GT3 Cup	Belcar 1	773	6th	4th
2008	(Belgium) MPM Racing by Verbist	(Belgium) Armand Fumal (Netherlands) Jos Menten (Belgium) Michel Pulinx	Porsche 996 GT3-RS	Belcar 3	773	3rd	2nd
2011	(Belgium) Prospeed Competition	(Belgium) Marc Goossens (Belgium) David Loix (Belgium) Maxime Soulet	Porsche 996 GT3-RS	GTO+	800	2nd	1st
2012	(Belgium) Marc VDS Racing Team	(Netherlands) Nick Catsburg (Belgium) Bas Leinders (Switzerland) Henri Moser	BMW Z4 GT3	GT-1	291	DNF	DNF
2015	(Belgium) Skylimit Yokohama Racing Team	(United Kingdom) Dale Lomas (Netherlands) Simon Podhalicz (Belgium) Robin Put (Belgium) Davy Suffeleers	BMW Clubsport	T-6	639	30th	3rd
2016	(Belgium) Skylimit Yokohama Racing Team	(Hungary) Kata Bozó (Belgium) Nicolas Hermans (Belgium) Ines Lammens (Belgium) Jo Lammens	BMW E90 325i	Belcar 5	603	32nd	7th
2017	(Belgium) Skylimit Yokohama Racing Team	(Hungary) Kata Bozó (Belgium) Nicolas Hermans (Belgium) Ines Lammens (Belgium) Jo Lammens	BMW E90 325i	Belcar 5	645	24th	3rd
2019	(Belgium) JJ Motorsport/Xwift Racing	(Belgium) Pieter Denys (Belgium) Gregory Eyckmans (Belgium) Jamie-Jason Vandenbalck	BMW E90 325i	Belcar 6	668	15th	1st
