= 2000 Formula Renault 2000 Italia =

Motor racing competition

Seasons
- ← none 2001 →

The 2000 Formula Renault 2000 Italia season was the inaugural season of the Formula Renault 2000 Italia championship. It was won by Felipe Massa driving for Cram Competition. He had scored the same amount of points as Raffaele Giammaria but was given the title on account of having more wins.

== Drivers and Teams ==
2000 Entry List
Team	No.	Driver name	Rounds
(Italy) A.S. Fast Wheels	1	(Italy) Lorenzo Bontempelli	All
(Italy) A.S. Fast Wheels	2	(Italy) Nicola Fleury	1-2
(Italy) A.S. Fast Wheels	2	(Italy) Paolo Pezzoli	3-6
(Italy) ADM International	2	(Brazil) Fabio Carbone	10
(Italy) ADM International	6	(Brazil) Luis Mussi	10
(Italy) Scuderia Veregra	3	(Italy) Daniele Cardinali	1-9
(Italy) Scuderia Veregra	8	(Italy) Enzo Stentella	1-3
(Italy) Scuderia Veregra	85	(Italy) Enrico Moncada	5-7, 9
(Italy) D&B Competition	4	(Italy) Giampaolo Mele	1-8
(Italy) D&B Competition	4	(Italy) Irish Scarlato	9
(Italy) D&B Competition	5	(Italy) Mario Esposito	1-9
(Italy) D&B Competition	6	(Italy) Michael Rangoni	3
(Italy) D&B Competition	6	(Italy) Irish Scarlato	4
(Italy) D&B Competition	6	(Italy) Pascal Umdenstock	5-9
(Italy) D&B Competition	49	(Italy) Gianluca Pazzaglia	1
(Italy) Fire Wake Competition	7	(Italy) Michele Terruso	1
(Italy) Fire Wake Competition	9	(Italy) Enrico Moncada	2
(Italy) Fire Wake Competition	9	(Italy) Gianluca Petroselli	3-6
(Italy) Fire Wake Competition	19	(Netherlands) Ron van Toren	1
(Italy) Cram Competition	7	(Italy) Michele Terruso	2-7, 9-10
(Italy) Cram Competition	18	(Brazil) Augusto Farfus	1-7, 9-10
(Italy) Cram Competition	51	(Belgium) Jérôme Thiry	4
(Italy) Cram Competition	91	(Brazil) Felipe Massa	1-7, 10
(Italy) LT Motorsport	8	(Italy) Enzo Stentella	5-6
(Italy) Toby Racing	9	(Italy) Denis Babuin	8-9
(Italy) Toby Racing	58	(Italy) Natale Maggio	All
(Italy) Prema Powerteam	11	(Italy) Ronnie Quintarelli	All
(Italy) Prema Powerteam	12	(Italy) Stefano Attianese	1-6
(Italy) Prema Powerteam	12	(Italy) Luca Scarcia	7-9
(Italy) Prema Powerteam	12	(Australia) Ryan Briscoe	10
(Italy) Nastro Azzurro JD Motorsport	14	(United States) Richard Antinucci	2-5, 7, 10
(Italy) Nastro Azzurro JD Motorsport	31	(Italy) Matteo Grassotto	2, 4-6
(Italy) Nastro Azzurro JD Motorsport	32	(France) Jean de Pourtales	4, 10
(Germany) SL Racing	15	(Germany) Markus Winkelhock	4-6, 10
(Germany) SL Racing	17	(Germany) Marco Knauf	4-6, 10
(Italy) BVM Racing	19	(Netherlands) Ron van Toren	2-6
(Italy) BVM Racing	42	(Italy) Alessandro Piccolo	All
(Italy) BVM Racing	43	(Italy) Antony Bertocchi	1, 10
(Italy) Drumel Motorsport	21	(Italy) Fausto Ippoliti	All
(Italy) Drumel Motorsport	22	(Italy) Raffaele Giammaria	All
(Italy) Drumel Motorsport	23	(Italy) Alessandro Boz	1-3
(Italy) Drumel Motorsport	23	(Italy) Enrico Garbelli	4
(Italy) Drumel Motorsport	23	(Italy) Alfonso Di Benedetto	5-7
(Italy) Drumel Motorsport	23	(Italy) Antonio De Pace	8
(Italy) Drumel Motorsport	23	(Italy) Alessandro Tonoli	9
(Italy) Drumel Motorsport	23	(Italy) Andrea Scafuro	10
(Italy) Drumel Motorsport	24	(Italy) Alessandro Terlizzi	1-6
(Italy) Drumel Motorsport	24	(Italy) Fabrizio De Pace	8
(Italy) Drumel Motorsport	24	(Italy) David Bruni	10
(Italy) Drumel Motorsport	25	(Italy) Mirko Venturi	All
(Italy) Drumel Motorsport	45	(Italy) Ettore Colla	9
(Italy) RC Benetton Junior Team	26	(Italy) Fabrizio del Monte	All
(Italy) RC Benetton Junior Team	27	(Italy) Antonio De Pace	1-3
(Italy) RC Benetton Junior Team	27	(Italy) Tommaso Baschera	5-10
(Italy) RC Benetton Junior Team	28	(Italy) Fabrizio De Pace	1-3
(Italy) RC Benetton Junior Team	28	(Italy) Alessandro Terlizzi	7-8
(Italy) RC Benetton Junior Team	28	(Italy) Massimiliano Russomando	9
(Italy) RP Motorsport	29	(Italy) Stefano D'Aste	1-6
(Italy) RP Motorsport	29	(Italy) Giovanni Berton	8-10
(Italy) RP Motorsport	66	(Italy) Alessandro Vitacolonna	1-6, 8-9
(Italy) RP Motorsport	69	(Italy) Filippo Magni	1-2, 4
(Italy) RP Motorsport	69	(Italy) Alessandro Cisternino	8-9
(Italy) Door's Engineering	33	(Italy) Luca Pasquesi	1-9
(Italy) Door's Engineering	33	(Italy) Matteo Pellegrino	10
(Italy) Door's Engineering	34	(Italy) Emilio Berti	All
(Italy) Door's Engineering	35	(Italy) Denis Babuin	1-2, 4-6
(Italy) Door's Engineering	36	(Italy) Nicola Gianniberti	All
(Italy) Door's Engineering	37	(Italy) Enea Casoni	1
(Italy) Door's Engineering	38	(Italy) Davide Mastracci	1-9
(Italy) Door's Engineering	87	(Italy) Nicola Cadei	7
(Italy) Bicar Racing	37	(Italy) Enea Casoni	3-10
(Italy) Bicar Racing	41	(Italy) Roberto Toninelli	All
(Italy) Aquila Automotive	39	(Austria) Norbert Groer	1, 4
(Italy) Emmegi Promotion	44	(Italy) Bernardo Manfrè	1, 3-4, 7, 9
(Italy) Durango Benetton Junior Team	46	(Italy) Michele Rugolo	All
(Italy) Durango Benetton Junior Team	65	(Italy) Stefano Mocellini	1-2, 5-10
(Italy) Durango Benetton Junior Team	82	(Italy) Simone Galluzzo	3-4
(Italy) B&B Birel	48	(Italy) Mauro Massironi	All
(Italy) Savelli Racing Team	55	(Italy) Andrea Tiso	1-2, 8-9
(Italy) System Team	56	(Italy) Alessandro Tonoli	1-6
(Italy) Lucidi Motors Srl	67	(Italy) Daniele Toia	1-2, 4-8
(Italy) Lucidi Motors Srl	68	(Italy) Filippo Zadotti	All
(Russia) Sport Autoclub Racing	94	(Russia) Aleksey Dudukalo	10
(Russia) Sport Autoclub Racing	95	(Russia) Sergey Zlobin	10

== Calendar ==
Round	Circuit	Date	Pole position	Fastest lap	Winning driver	Winning team
1	(Italy) Autodromo Enzo e Dino Ferrari	May 14	(Italy) Ronnie Quintarelli	(Italy) Alessandro Piccolo	(Brazil) Felipe Massa	(Italy) Cram Competition
2	(Italy) Autodromo dell'Umbria	May 28	(United States) Richard Antinucci	(Italy) Alessandro Piccolo	(Italy) Ronnie Quintarelli	(Italy) Prema Powerteam
3	(Italy) Autodromo Riccardo Paletti	June 18	(Brazil) Felipe Massa	(Brazil) Felipe Massa	(Italy) Ronnie Quintarelli	(Italy) Prema Powerteam
4	(Italy) Autodromo Nazionale Monza	June 25	(Brazil) Felipe Massa	(Italy) Nicola Gianniberti	(Brazil) Felipe Massa	(Italy) Cram Competition
5	(Italy) ACI Vallelunga Circuit	July 22	(Brazil) Felipe Massa	(Italy) Raffaele Giammaria	(Italy) Raffaele Giammaria	(Italy) Drumel Motorsport
6	(Italy) ACI Vallelunga Circuit	July 23	(Brazil) Felipe Massa	(Brazil) Felipe Massa	(Brazil) Felipe Massa	(Italy) Cram Competition
7	(Italy) Autodromo di Pergusa	September 3	(Italy) Nicola Gianniberti	(Italy) Fabrizio del Monte	(Italy) Nicola Gianniberti	(Italy) Door's Engineering
8	(Italy) Binetto	September 24	(Italy) Fabrizio del Monte	(Italy) Raffaele Giammaria	(Italy) Raffaele Giammaria	(Italy) Drumel Motorsport
9	(Italy) Misano World Circuit	October 22	(Brazil) Augusto Farfus	(Brazil) Augusto Farfus	(Brazil) Augusto Farfus	(Italy) Cram Competition
10	(Spain) Circuit Ricardo Tormo	December 9	(Italy) Raffaele Giammaria	(Brazil) Felipe Massa	(Brazil) Felipe Massa	(Italy) Cram Competition

== Championship standings ==
Points are awarded to the drivers as follows:

Position	1	2	3	4	5	6	7	8	9	10	PP	FL
Points	30	24	20	16	12	10	8	6	4	2	2	2

=== Drivers ===
Pos	Driver	IMO (Italy)	MGI (Italy)	VAR (Italy)	MNZ (Italy)	VLL (Italy)		PER (Italy)	BIN (Italy)	MIS (Italy)	VAL (Spain)	Points
Pos	Driver	1	2	3	4	5	6	7	8	9	10	Points
1	(Brazil) Felipe Massa	1	Ret	Ret	1	14	1	3			1	147
2	(Italy) Raffaele Giammaria	4	20	3	5	1	24	5	1	9	3	147
3	(Italy) Ronnie Quintarelli	2	1	1	11	26	9	8	3	3	6	145
4	(Italy) Alessandro Piccolo	3	5	2	2	5	6	4	15	5	27	131
5	(Italy) Roberto Toninelli	6	9	4	3	8	13	7	12	4	7	88
6	(Italy) Fabrizio del Monte	30	2	Ret	Ret	7	2	13	14	2	11	82
7	(Italy) Mirko Venturi	5	Ret	Ret	10	2	3	2	13	19	12	82
8	(Italy) Nicola Gianniberti	31	4	Ret	14	9	28	1	5	6	26	74
9	(Italy) Natale Maggio	10	7	7	6	6	5	12	6	8	5	74
10	(Brazil) Augusto Farfus	11	Ret	15	23	Ret	Ret	6		1	9	46
11	(Italy) Filippo Zadotti	8	Ret	9	26	3	7	15	7	14	Ret	46
12	(Italy) Matteo Grassotto		3		7	Ret	4					44
13	(United States) Richard Antinucci		Ret	Ret	4	Ret		10			2	42
14	(Italy) Fausto Ippoliti	7	19	6	12	20	Ret	Ret	4	16	8	40
15	(Italy) Alessandro Vitacolonna	18	Ret	5	Ret	16	26		2	13		36
16	(Italy) Davide Mastracci	Ret	8	12	DNQ	4	8	14	18	10		30
17	(Australia) Ryan Briscoe										4	16
18	(Italy) Luca Pasquesi	12	Ret	8	Ret	10	11	9	17	23		12
19	(Italy) Fabrizio De Pace	DNQ	6	DNQ					16			10
20	(Italy) Michele Rugolo	Ret	14	DNQ	24	Ret	12	Ret	Ret	7	10	10
21	(Germany) Markus Winkelhock				8	23	10				28	8
22	(Italy) Luca Scarcia							17	8	11		6
23	(Italy) Stefano D'Aste	9	Ret	10	Ret	11	18					6
24	(Italy) Denis Babuin	23	10		9	24	Ret		DNQ	Ret		6
25	(Italy) Giovanni Berton								9	20	21	4
26	(Italy) Stefano Mocellini	17	DNQ			Ret	DNQ	25	10	Ret	13	2
27	(Italy) Lorenzo Bontempelli	14	16	11	17	12	14	11	Ret	18	20	0
28	(Italy) Andrea Tiso	20	DNQ						11	26		0
29	(Italy) Antonio De Pace	DNQ	11	DNQ					DNQ			0
30	(Italy) Alessandro Boz	Ret	12	14								0
31	(Italy) Massimiliano Russomando									12		0
32	(Italy) Alessandro Terlizzi	13	15	Ret	13	22	25	Ret	DNQ			0
33	(Italy) Daniele Cardinali	Ret	13	DNQ	Ret	13	20	Ret	DNQ	17		0
34	(Italy) Stefano Attianese	29	DNQ	13	27	DNQ	27					0
35	(Italy) Antony Bertocchi	15									14	0
36	(Italy) Alfonso Di Benedetto					15	17	16				0
37	(Italy) Gianluca Petroselli			DNQ	15	25	16					0
38	(Italy) Mauro Massironi	19	18	DNQ	Ret	17	Ret	18	DNQ	21	15	0
39	(Netherlands) Ron van Toren	24	DNQ	DNQ	DNQ	21	15					0
40	(Italy) Alessandro Cisternino								Ret	15		0
41	(France) Jean de Pourtales				16						16	0
42	(Italy) Nicola Fleury	16	DNQ									0
43	(Italy) Alessandro Tonoli	DNQ	17	DNQ	DNQ	19	19			22		0
44	(Germany) Marco Knauf				DNQ	DNQ	21				17	0
45	(Italy) Emilio Berti	DNQ	DNQ	DNQ	18	Ret	DNQ	20	DNQ	31	Ret	0
46	(Italy) Tommaso Baschera					18	Ret	22	DNQ	27	Ret	0
47	(Brazil) Luis Mussi										18	0
48	(Italy) Bernardo Manfrè	Ret		DNQ	19			19		24		0
49	(Brazil) Fabio Carbone										19	0
50	(Italy) Enrico Garbelli				20							0
51	(Italy) Enrico Moncada		DNQ			DNQ	22	21		30		0
52	(Italy) Giampaolo Mele	DNQ	DNQ	DNQ	21	DNQ	DNQ	24	DNQ		25	0
53	(Italy) Daniele Toia	21	DNQ		DNQ	Ret	DNQ	Ret	DNQ			0
54	(Italy) Enea Casoni	22		DNQ	DNQ	DNQ	DNQ	Ret	DNQ	32	22	0
55	(Austria) Norbert Groer	27			22							0
56	(Italy) Michele Terruso	DNQ	DNQ	DNQ	DNQ	DNQ	23	Ret		29	24	0
57	(Italy) Pascal Umdenstock					DNQ	DNQ	23	DNQ	28		0
58	(Russia) Aleksey Dudukalo										23	0
59	(Italy) Irish Scarlato				25					33		0
60	(Italy) Filippo Magni	25	DNQ		Ret							0
61	(Italy) Ettore Colla									25		0
62	(Italy) Enzo Stentella	26	DNQ	DNQ		DNQ	Ret					0
63	(Italy) Gianluca Pazzaglia	28										0
	(Italy) Mario Esposito	DNQ	DNQ	DNQ	DNQ	DNQ	DNQ	Ret	DNQ	Ret		0
	(Italy) Michael Rangoni			Ret								0
	(Belgium) Jérôme Thiry				Ret							0
	(Italy) Nicola Cadei							Ret				0
	(Italy) David Bruni										Ret	0
	(Italy) Andrea Scafuro										Ret	0
	(Russia) Sergey Zlobin										Ret	0
	(Italy) Matteo Pellegrino										Ret	0
	(Italy) Paolo Pezzoli			DNQ	DNQ	DNQ	DNQ					0
	(Italy) Simone Galluzzo			DNQ	DNQ							0
