= Audi R8 (Type 42) =

Sports car

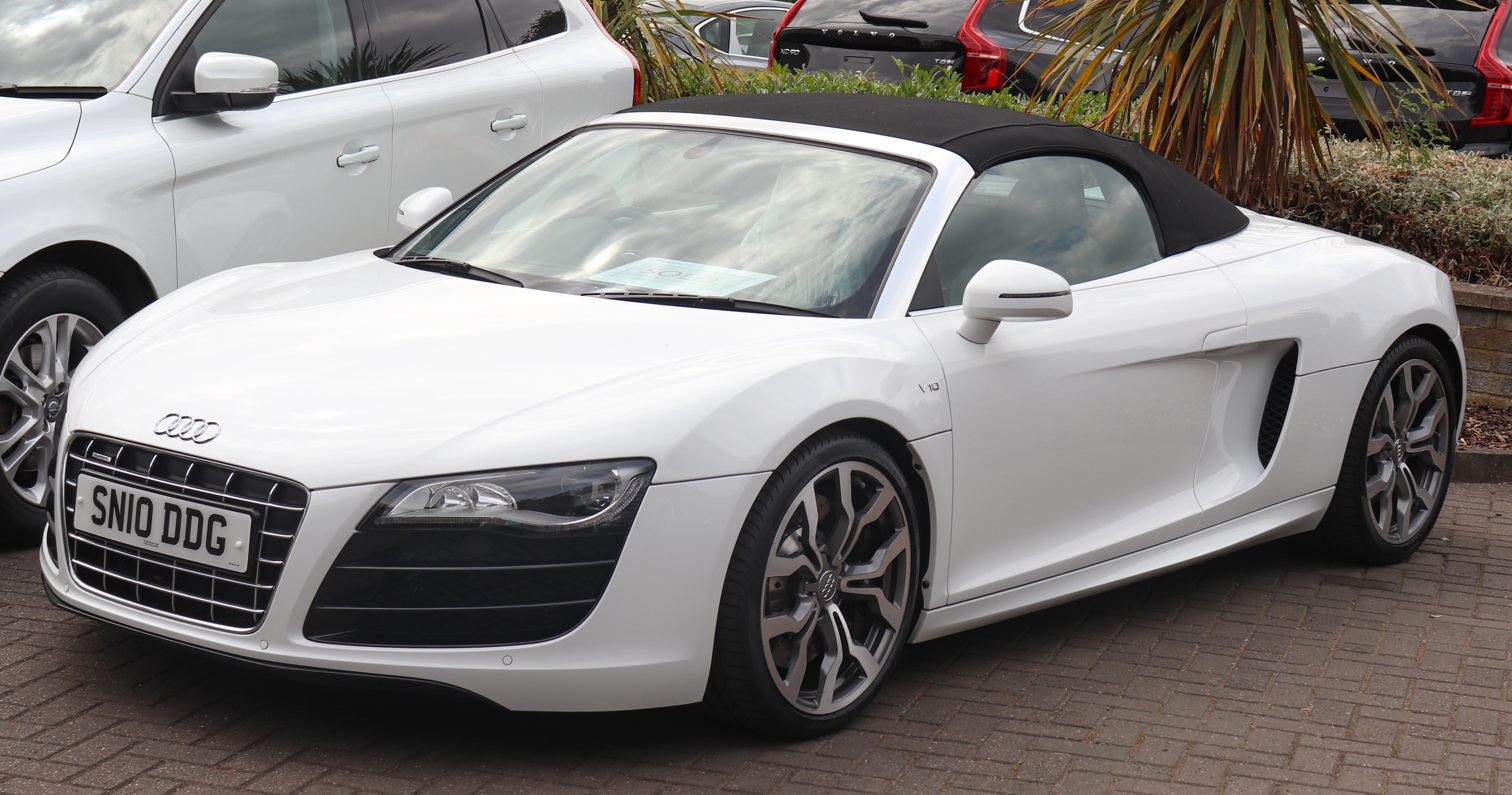
- Audi R8 V10 (pre 2013 facelift)

Overview
- Manufacturer: Audi Sport GmbH (subsidiary of Audi AG)
- Production: June 2006 – August 2015
- Model years: 2007–2015
- Assembly: Germany: Neckarsulm (2006–2015); Heilbronn (Audi Böllinger Höfe: 2014–2015)
- Designer: Walter de Silva; Frank Lamberty (2004)

Body and chassis
- Class: Sports car (S)
- Body style: 2-door coupé 2-door convertible (spyder)
- Related: Audi RSQ (Concept); Audi Le Mans quattro (Concept); Audi R8 TDI Le Mans (Concept); Lamborghini Gallardo

Powertrain
- Engine: 4.2 L FSI DOHC V8; 5.2 L FSI DOHC V10
- Transmission: 6-speed Graziano manual; 6-speed Graziano R-Tronic single-clutch automated manual; 7-speed DL800 S-Tronic dual-clutch

Dimensions
- Wheelbase: 2,650 mm (104.3 in)
- Length: V8 Coupé: 4,431 mm (174.4 in), V10 Coupé: 4,435 mm (174.6 in), V10 Spyder: 4,434 mm (174.6 in)
- Width: V8 Coupé & V10 Spyder: 1,904 mm (75.0 in), V10 Coupé: 1,930 mm (76.0 in)
- Height: V8 Coupé: 1,249 mm (49.2 in), V10 Coupé: 1,252 mm (49.3 in), V10 Spyder: 1,244 mm (49.0 in)
- Curb weight: V8 Coupé: 1,560–1,565 kg (3,439–3,450 lb), V10 Coupé: 1,620–1,625 kg (3,571–3,583 lb), V10 Spyder: 1,720–1,725 kg (3,792–3,803 lb)

Chronology
- Successor: Audi R8 (Type 4S)

The Audi R8 (Type 42) is the first generation of the R8 sports car developed and manufactured by German automobile manufacturer Audi. Conceived in 2003 in concept form, the R8 was put into production in June 2006. The Type 42 is based on the Lamborghini Gallardo and shares its chassis and engine. Audi's parent company Volkswagen Group owns Lamborghini as well and components of both of the cars were shared mainly to save development costs. Production of the Type 42 ended in August 2015, following the introduction of the Type 4S at the 2015 Geneva Motor Show which was based on an entirely new platform.

== Conception and development ==
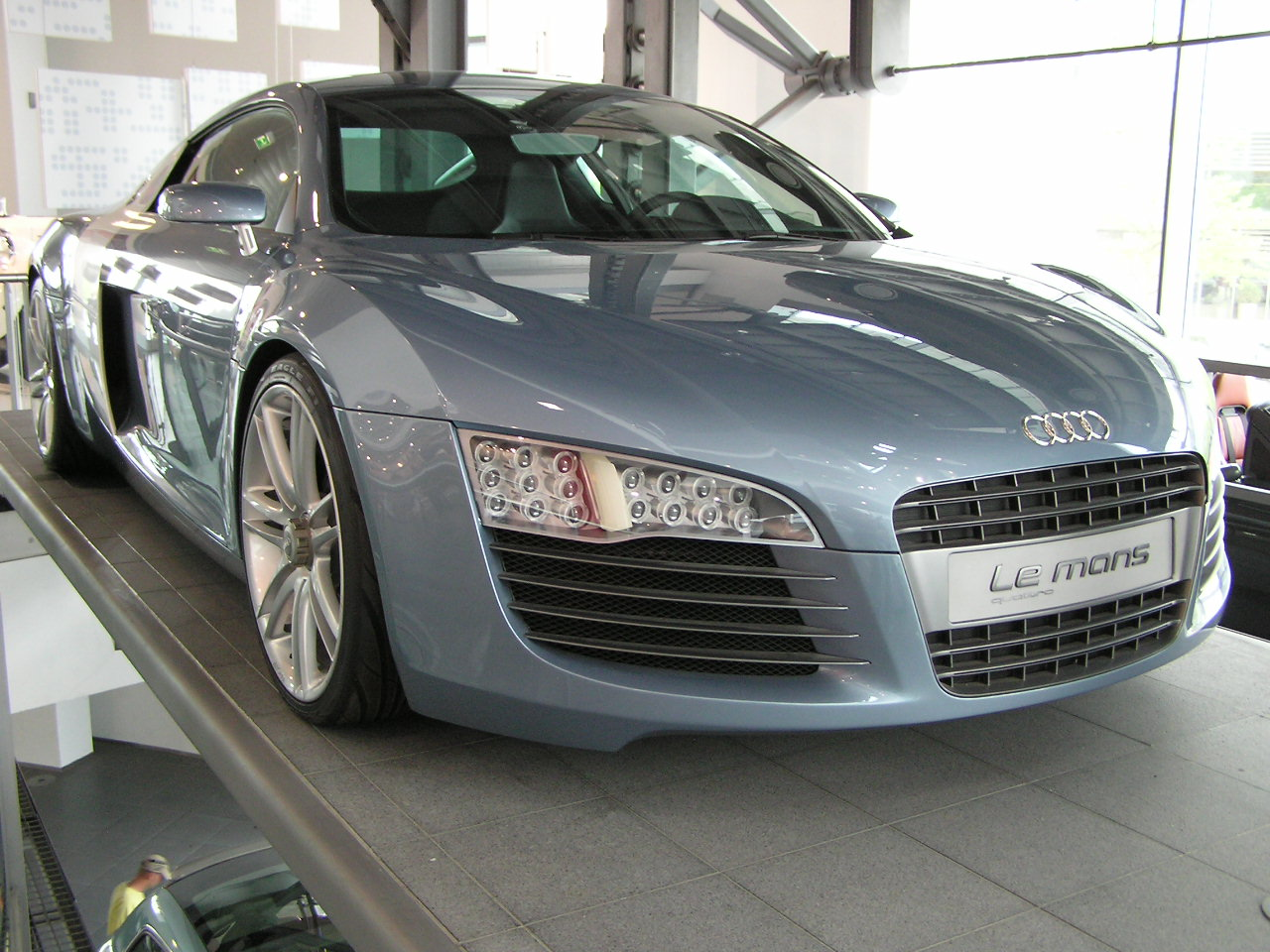
Audi Le Mans quattro concept

The Audi R8 was first conceived as the Audi LeMans Quattro concept car which was presented to the public at the 2003 Frankfurt Motor Show, followed by the 2003 Geneva Motor Show. Designed by Frank Lamberty, the car featured many unique features such as a Jet Blue exterior colour, the front curve of the front wings shared with the TT along with Nuvolari quattro GT, 20-inch wheels, a twin-turbocharged FSI V10 engine with a rated power output of 610 PS (449 kW; 602 hp) and 750 N⋅m (553.17 lb⋅ft), a single-frame radiator grille, aluminium sports suspension with magnetic ride shock absorbers and dark interior colours. The body of the car was made of aluminium and carbon fibre in order to keep the weight low. Another unique feature of the car were its full LED headlamps.

The R8 development program began in 2004 with Frank Lamberty's design being approved and frozen for production. In 2005, Audi announced that the name of the successful Audi R8 race car would be used for a new road car in 2007. Production body prototypes began field testing in January 2006 and the car was introduced to the public at the 2006 Paris Motor Show.

In 2007, Audi was the first manufacturer to mass produce headlights that solely used LEDs, which were used in the Audi R8.

== Road models ==
=== R8 Coupé 4.2 FSI quattro (2006–2012) ===
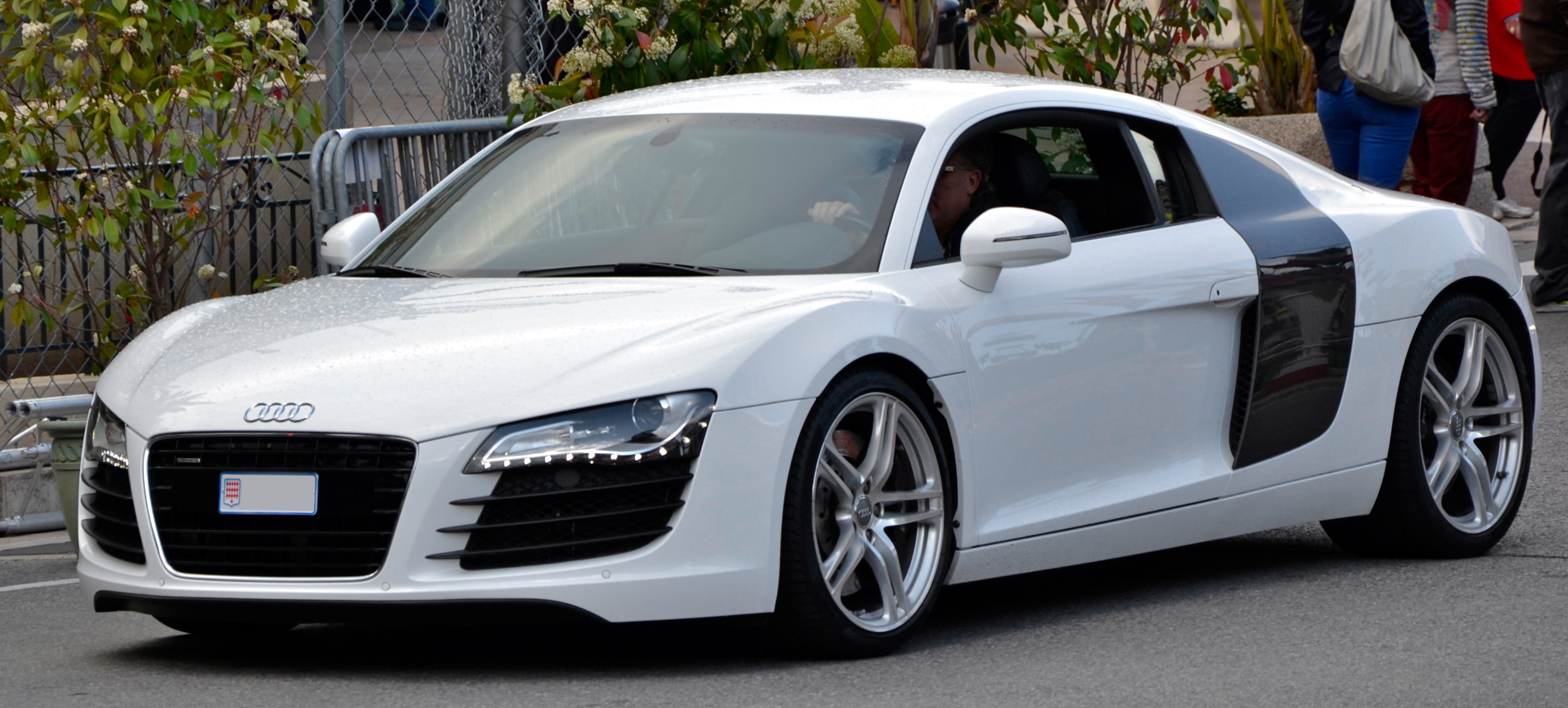
The R8 V8 Coupé

The Audi R8 was initially equipped with a V8 engine. Specifically, it is an all-aluminium alloy 32-valve (four valves per cylinder) petrol engine, utilising Fuel Stratified Injection (FSI), and has a displacement of 4,163 cc (4.2 L). It develops a motive power output of 420 PS (309 kW; 414 hp) (Directive 80/1269/EEC), and generates 430 N⋅m (317 lbf⋅ft) of torque, on 98 RON 'Super Unleaded' petrol. It is basically the same engine used in the B7 RS 4, but is modified to use a dry sump lubrication system. It uses two chain-driven double overhead camshafts (DOHC) per cylinder bank, and utilises variable valve timing for both inlet and exhaust camshafts. The 4 wheel drive system is biased towards the rear; it can send up to 70% of its power to the rear wheels and 30% to the front. According to Road & Track the 4.2-liter V-8 R8 did a zero to 60 mph sprint in 4.0 seconds in the manual version while the automated manual version did it in 4.3 seconds and a top speed of 301 km/h (187 mph). Both gearboxes were built by Graziano Trasmissioni.

=== R8 Coupé 5.2 FSI quattro (2009–2012) ===
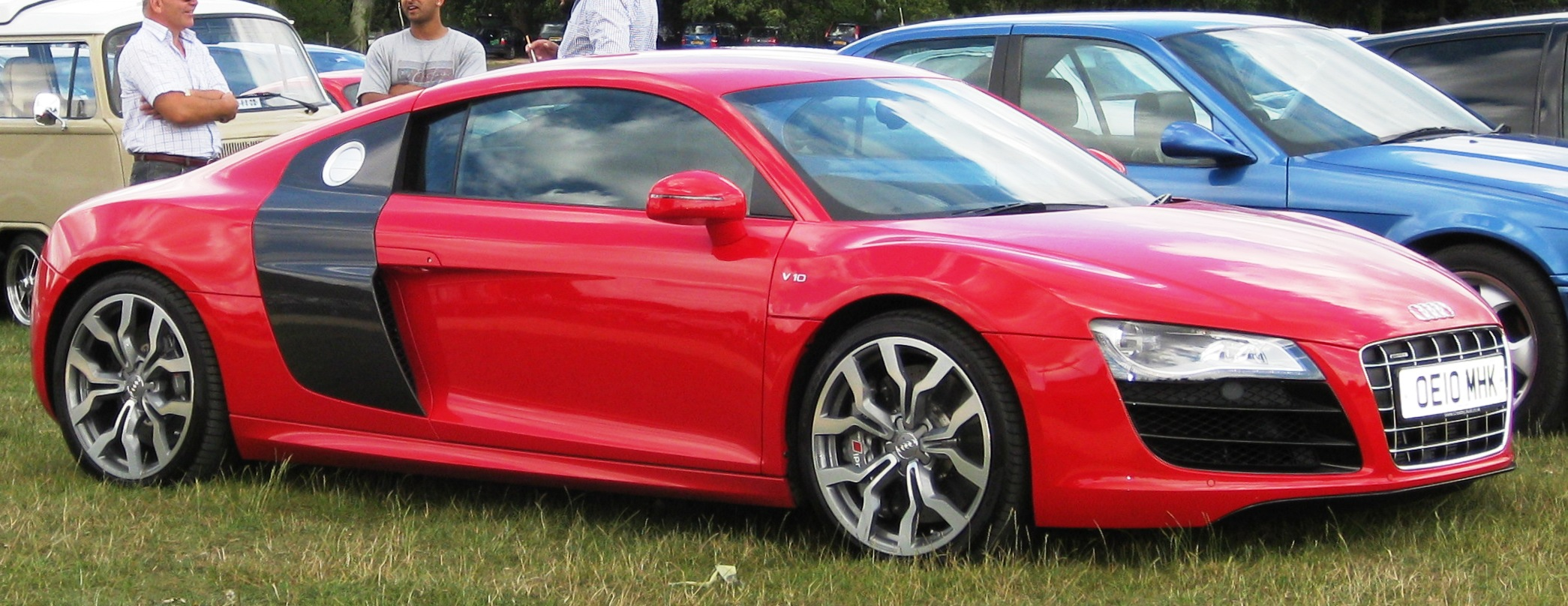
R8 V10 Coupé

Audi AG unveiled the Audi R8 V10 on December 8, 2008. It uses an FSI V10 engine, based on the unit in the Lamborghini Gallardo LP560-4 (which in turn was based on the 5.2 FSI V10 as used in the C6 S6 and D3 S8), but is re-tuned to have a power output of 525 PS (386 kW; 518 hp), and 530 N⋅m (391 lbf⋅ft) of torque. Compared to the V8 variant, the R8 V10's performance numbers are enhanced. Audi states the new 0 to 100 km/h (0 to 62 mph) acceleration time as 3.9 seconds, 97 to 200 km/h (60 to 124 mph) in 8.1 seconds, and a top speed of 316 km/h (196 mph). Other changes to the V10 version of the R8 include some aesthetic differences: such as all-LED headlights (a world-first), "V10" badging on the front fenders, interior enhancements such as Bang & Olufsen 465 watt sound system, a more aggressive body styling, larger rear brakes, a dual outlet exhaust system and different wheels.

=== R8 Spyder 5.2 FSI quattro (2010–2012) ===
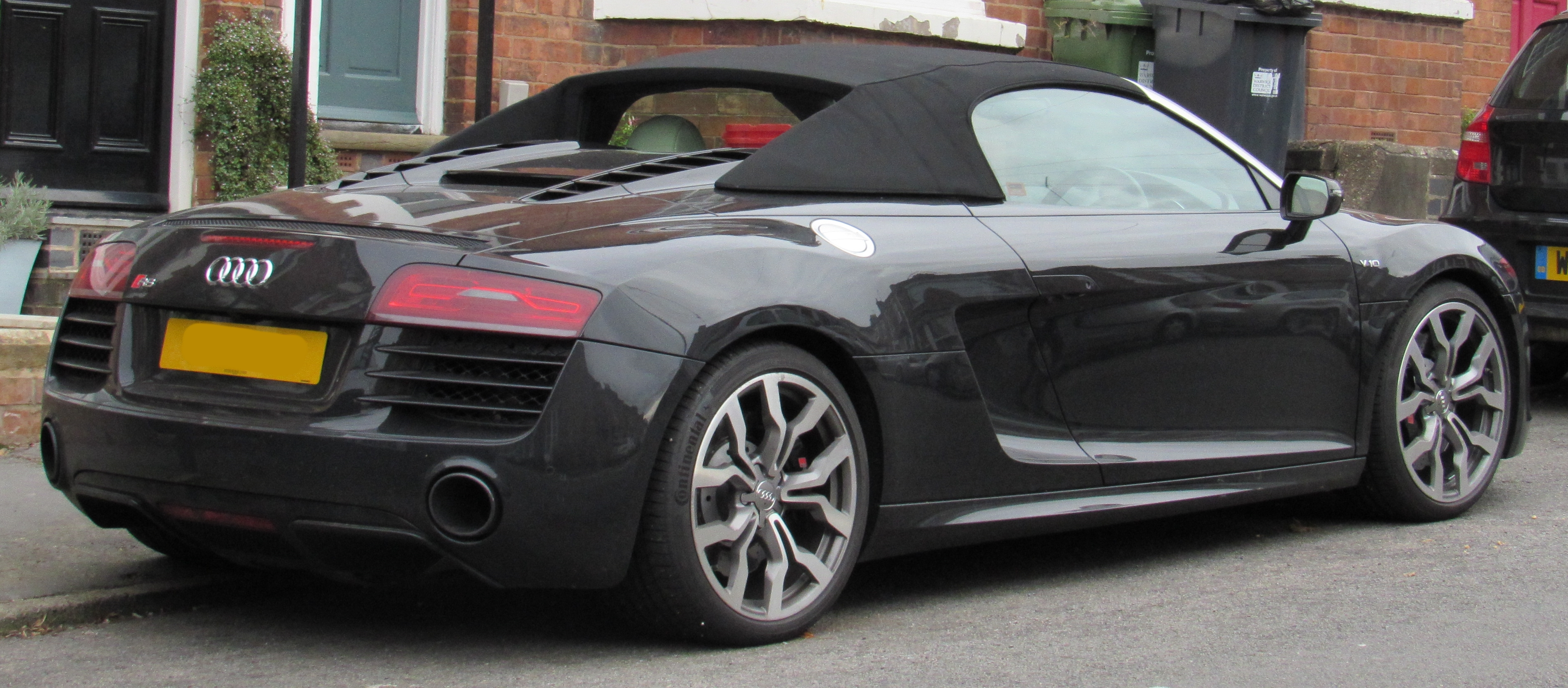
The R8 V10 Spyder

Although it was rumoured by the automotive press since the announcement of the production variant of the R8 in 2006, it was only in August 2008 that spy shots of a convertible R8 "Spyder" from filming scenes of the movie Iron Man 2 were published online. The photos showed a clearly visible soft-top roof and the absence of the distinctive "sideblades" found on the V10 FSI coupé. The R8 Spyder was formally unveiled at the 2009 Frankfurt Motor Show. Compared with the coupé model, the convertible had extra chassis support, a pair of roll-over safety bars, as well as minor changes such as the location of the fuel filler cap. It was powered by the same uneven firing 5.2-litre V10 engine as the coupé.

=== R8 Spyder 4.2 FSI quattro (2011–2012) ===
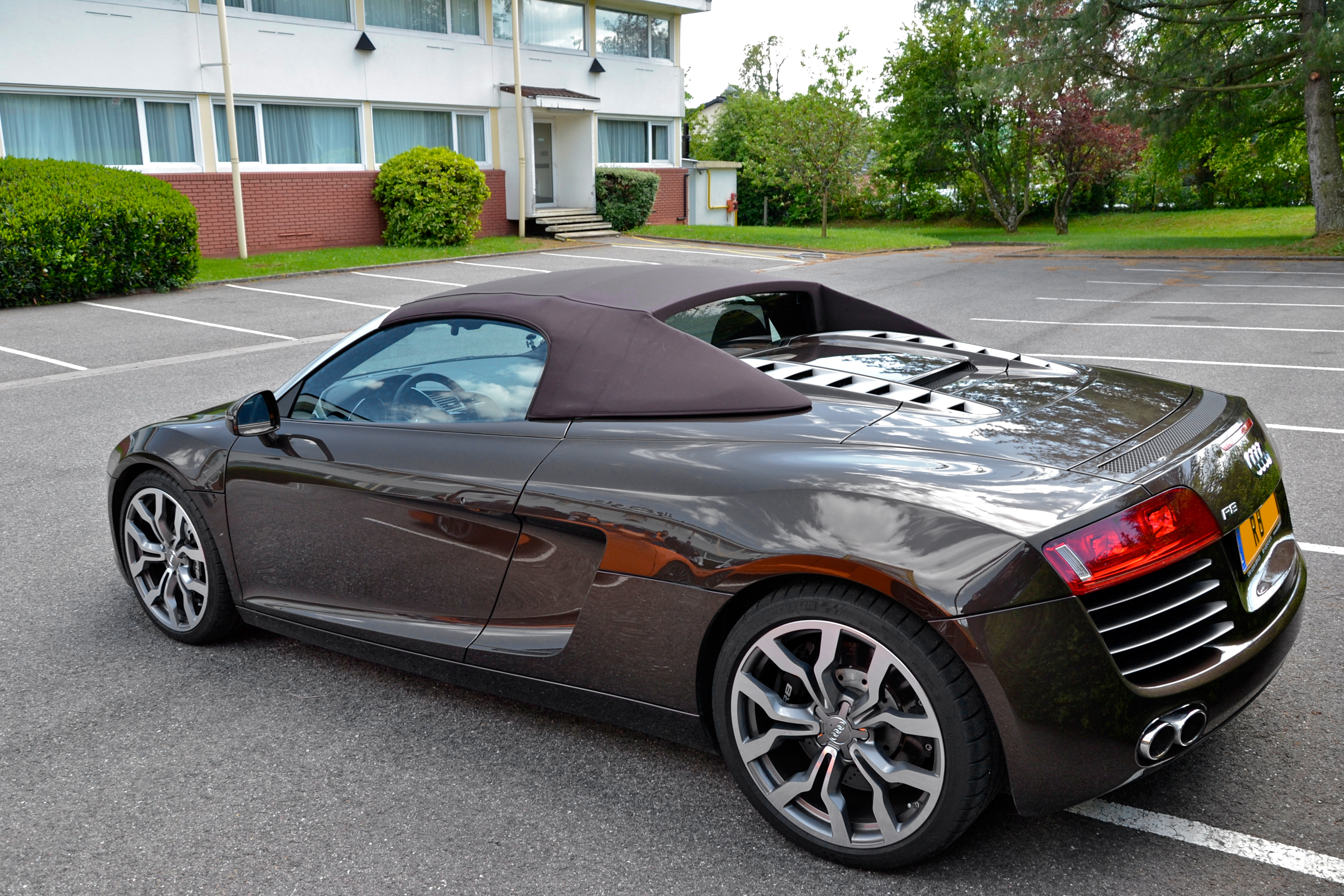
Audi R8 V8 Spyder

On April 11, 2011 automotive magazine Autocar reported that Audi has made the 4.2-litre FSI V8 engine available on the R8 Spyder, alongside the 5.2-litre V10 engine initially fitted. The 434 PS (319 kW; 428 hp) (an increase of 14 PS as compared to the coupé), 430 N⋅m (317 lbf⋅ft) unit now completed the R8 Spyder range alongside the V10 Spyder offered. The V8 Spyder has a 0–100 km/h (0–62 mph) acceleration time of 4.3 seconds and could attain a top speed of 300 km/h (186 mph). Like the V10 model, the V8 Spyder features an aluminium spaceframe with carbon composite construction and an automatic retractable folding cloth roof.

=== R8 GT (2011–2013) ===
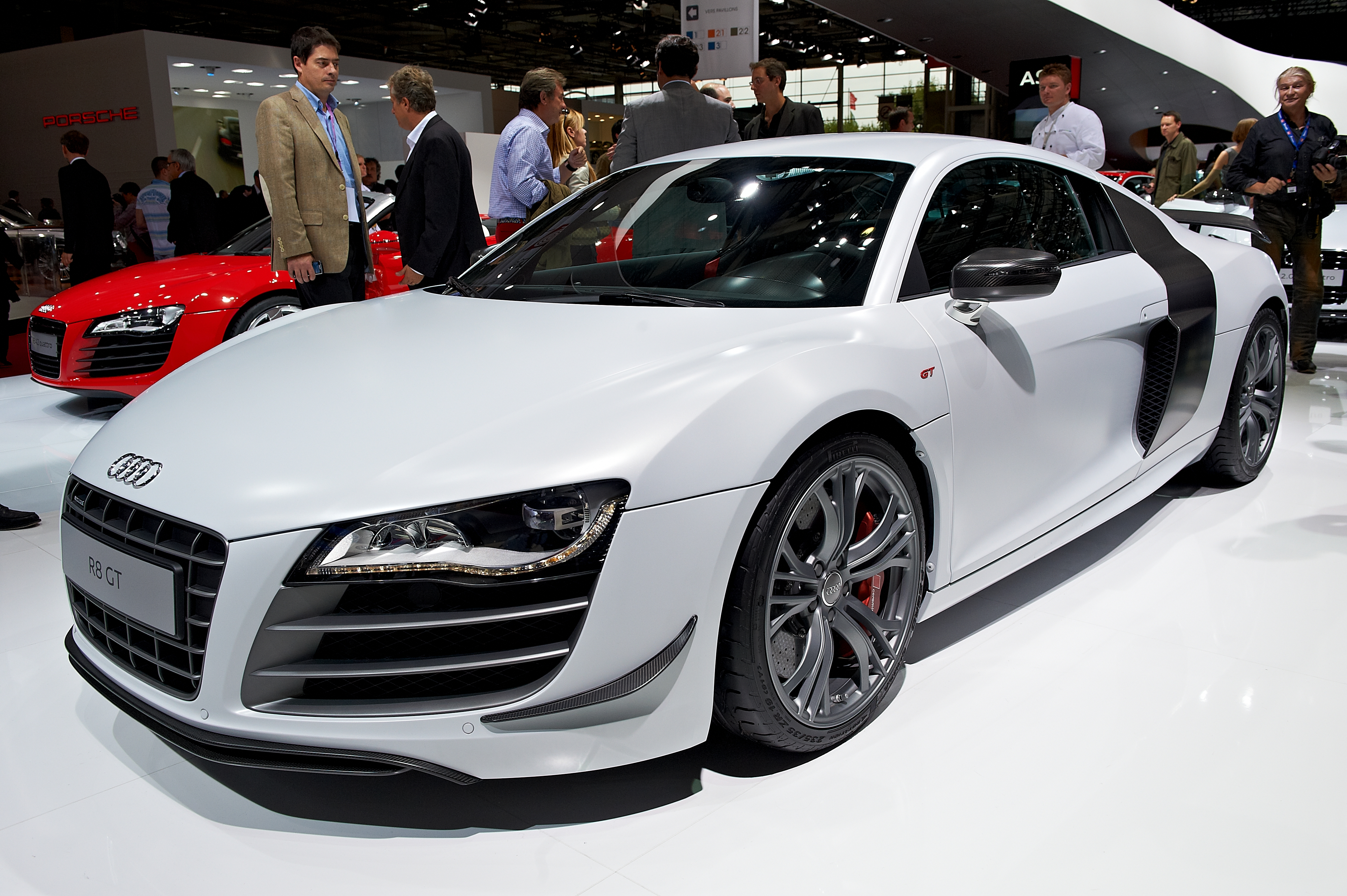
Audi R8 GT at the 2010 Paris Motor Show

Introduced at the 2010 Wörthersee Tour, the Audi R8 GT is a high-performance variant of the R8 V10. The GT utilises a 5.2 L (5,204 cc) V10 with the quattro four-wheel drive system. Changes from the R8 5.2 FSI quattro include reduction in the curb weight by 100 kg (220 lb) to 1,525 kg (3,362 lb) and increased engine power to 560 PS (412 kW; 552 hp) at 8,000 rpm (367 PS (270 kW; 362 hp) per ton) and 540 N⋅m (398 lb⋅ft) at 6,500 rpm of torque. Because of these changes, the R8 GT has an increased top speed of 320 km/h (199 mph) and accelerates from 0–100 km/h (62 mph) in 3.6 seconds, 0.3 faster than the R8 V10. The car also features some visual changes including red brake calipers, a fixed rear wing, front bumper mounted winglets and GT badging in place of the standard V10 badging. The car was introduced for the 2012 model year and with a limited production of 333 cars worldwide with 35 destined for the UK market and 90 for the US market.

=== R8 GT Spyder ===
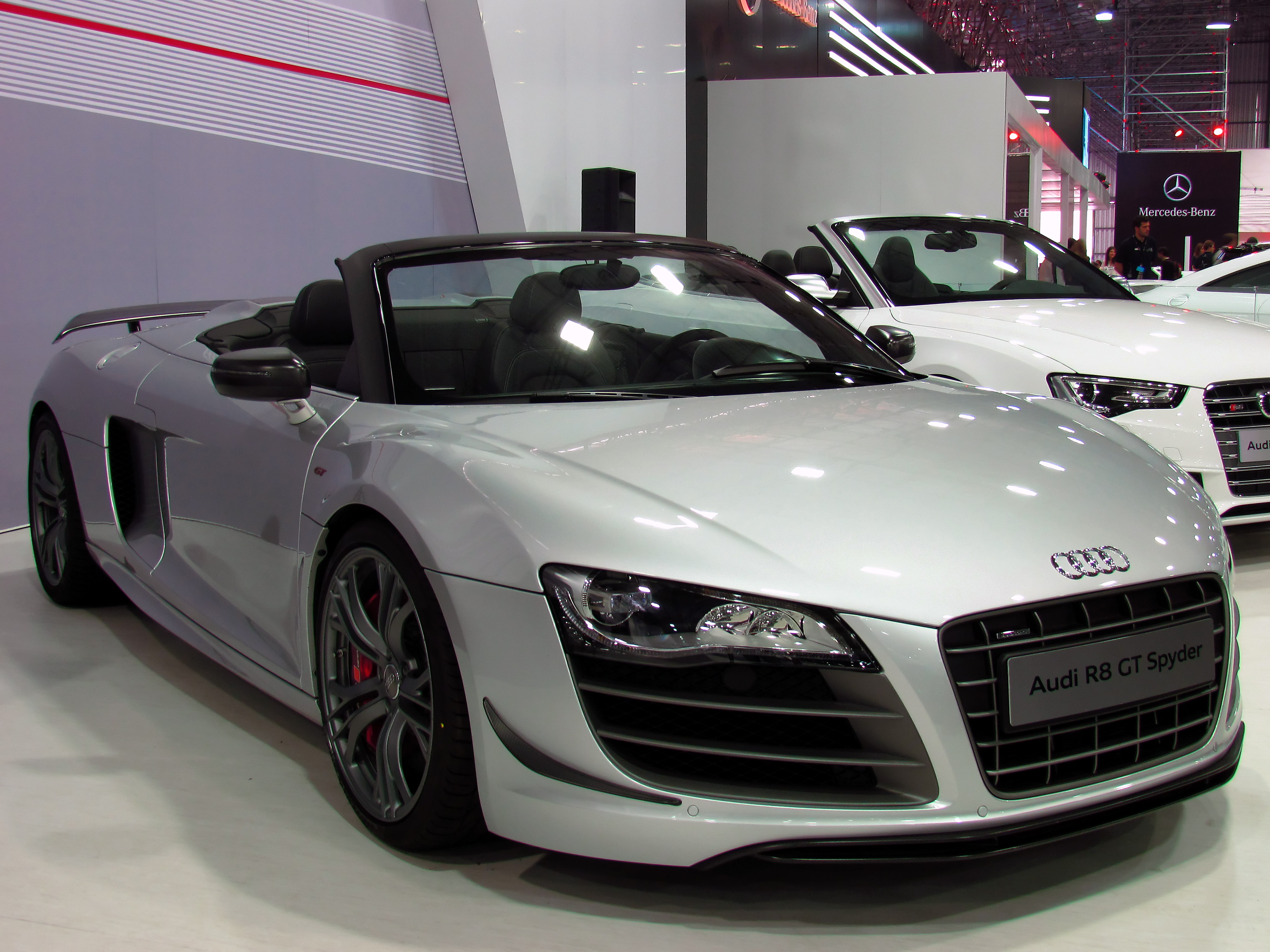
Audi R8 GT Spyder

Unveiled at the 2011 24 Hours of Le Mans, the R8 GT Spyder is the convertible version of the R8 GT. Limited to 333 units worldwide, the R8 GT Spyder combines the aggressiveness of the R8 GT with an open top driving experience. Aside from the roof, the only performance related change is the change in weight which has increased to 1,640 kg (3,616 lb) (dry weight). The engine frame is made of ultra-light magnesium; the soft top cover and the large side panels at the rear are made of carbon fibre reinforced polymer (CFRP). CFRP is also used for the modified front spoiler, the fixed rear spoiler and the new rear bumper; even the seats used are made of carbon fibre which result in a weight saving of 70 lb (32 kg) alone. Together, these components provide a weight saving of 85 kg (187 lb) over the standard V10 Spyder. Visual changes include add-on parts in contrasting titanium gray, a front splitter with a dual lip, flics at the sides of the front bumper, red GT badges, round exhaust tailpipes, an enlarged rear diffuser and tinted LED tail lights in a clear-glass design. A CFRP windshield frame is also available as an option. US model went on sale as a 2012 Model Year car, with delivery beginning in February 2012. Only 50 units were available for sale in the US.

== Race models ==
=== R8 LMS (2009–2012) ===
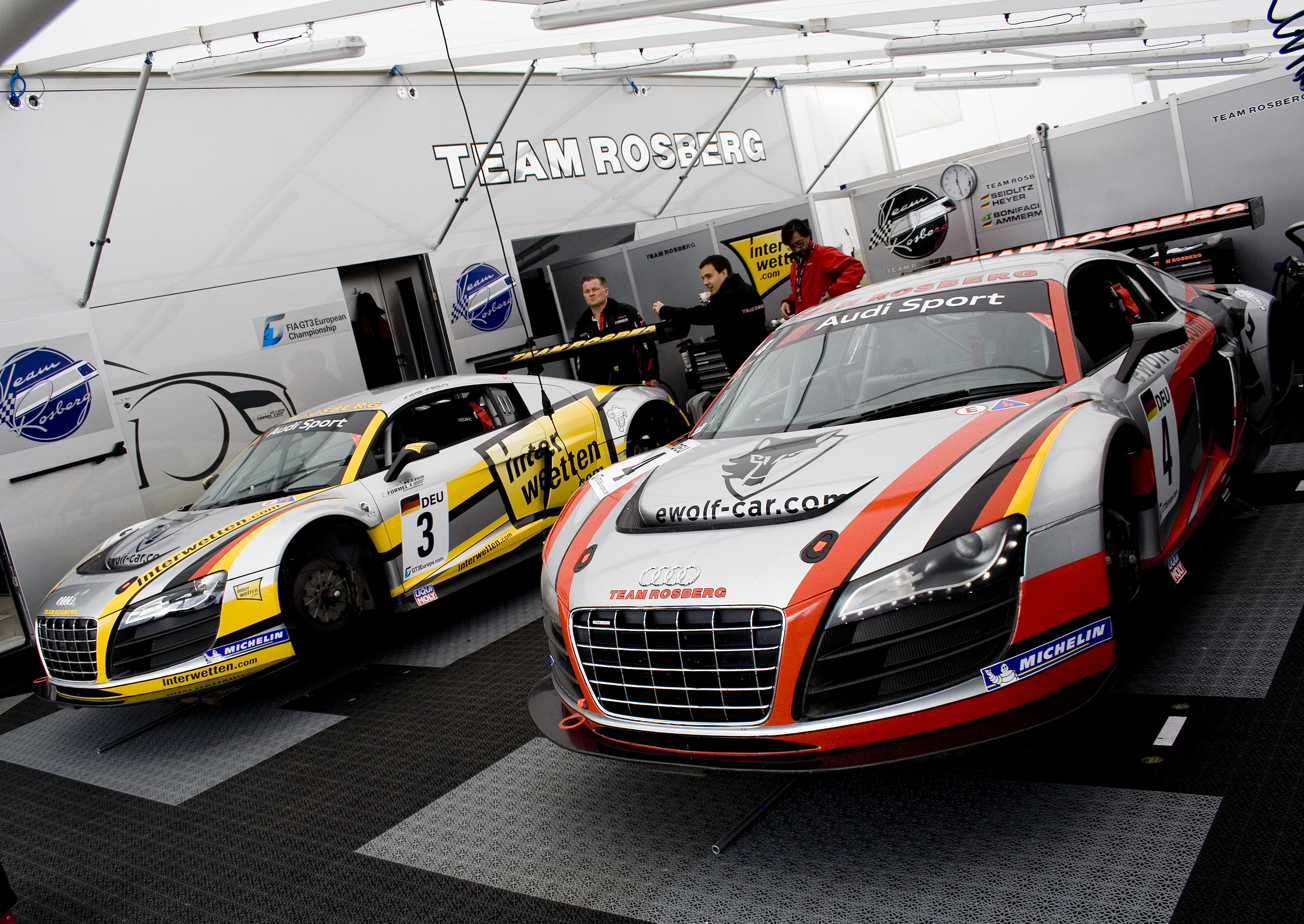
Two Audi R8 LMS' competing in the FIA GT3 European Championship

Audi R8 LMS at Goodwood Festival of Speed 2010

For 2009, Audi announced the production of an R8 LMS racing car, designed for the GT3 rules in the FIA GT3 European Championship and various national racing series. Known within Audi Sport as the 'R16', the R8 LMS features a 500 PS (368 kW; 493 hp) V10 engine. Because the GT3 regulations prohibit the use of four-wheel drive, Audi had to drop its 'trademark' quattro four-wheel drive system, and the R8 LMS was thus only available with the typical rear-wheel drive setup. The torque is transmitted via a newly developed six-speed sequential race oriented gearbox. The car was jointly manufactured by Audi Sport, quattro GmbH, and Audi Hungaria Motor Kft. (Győr). The first test races in various European racing series was scheduled for the 2009 season. Delivery to the customers was planned from the Autumn of 2010.

=== R8 LMS Evolution (2010) ===
Changes to the 2010 R8 LMS include the improvement of the engine cooling system capacity, suspension revisions, a race-optimised electronics and exhaust systems, and a 6-speed transmission that can be inspected through an opening in the housing without the need to dismantle the entire assembly. Previous variants could be upgraded via an update kit. The first deliveries of the car were made to the American-owned United Autosports team from Yorkshire in England.

=== R8 LMS ultra (2012–2015) ===
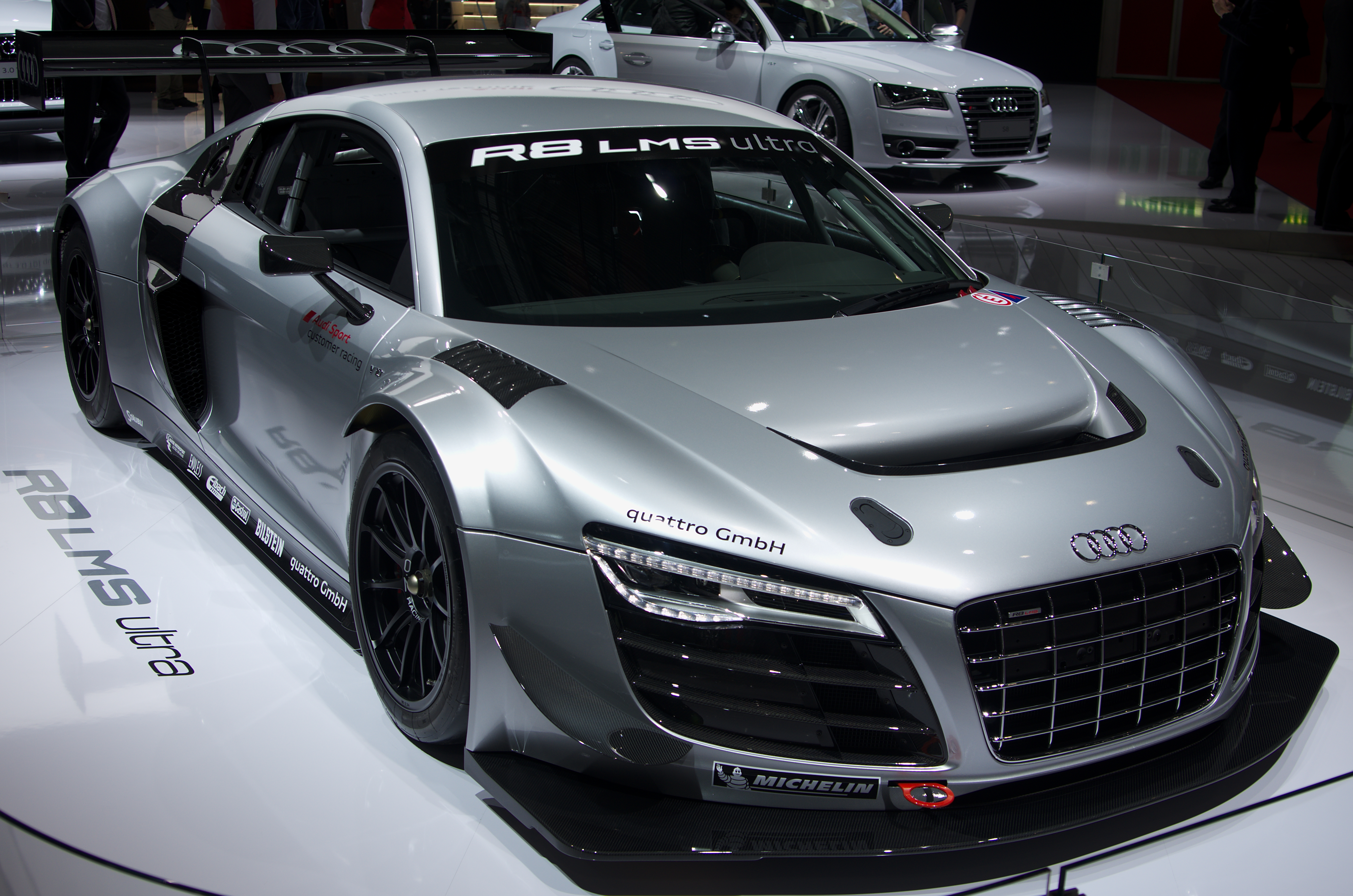
The R8 LMS ultra

Unveiled at the 2013 Geneva Motor Show, the R8 LMS ultra is a modified version of the Audi R8 LMS with CFRP (carbon-fibre-reinforced plastic) doors with high-energy absorbing new crash foams, new PS1 safety seat developed by Audi, updated transmission providing additional reserves on long-distance runs, increased power to 570 PS (419 kW; 562 hp) (depending on restrictor regulations) in the Audi CJJ V10 with higher torque at lower engine speeds, a larger engine oil cooler and transmission fluid cooler, relocated steering hydraulics oil cooler to the vehicle's midsection, enlarged air vents, improved air flow to radiator and interior, front 18-inch wheels with Michelin 30-65/18 tyres, optimized brake cooling at the front wheels, uniball joints transverse control arm mounts, weight-reduced compression and rebound-adjustable gas dampers from Bilstein, springs by Eibach, wider front hood with louvers, new wider rear wing with larger end plates, new front plate with optimised diffusion under the front end.

=== R8 Grand-Am (2012–2013) ===
As part of NASCAR's embracing of GT3 in their Grand American Road Racing Association Rolex Series races, GT3 cars were permitted to run with slight restrictions in the "national" GT3 in the United States. The R8 Grand-Am features an engine with its power reduced from 470 PS (346 kW; 464 hp) to 450 PS (331 kW; 444 hp) via an air restrictor and the engine electronics, a reduced fuel tank capacity of 83.3 litres, three-part rims for wheels and suspension, and deactivated anti-lock system and traction control (as NASCAR/Grand-Am does not permit either traction control nor anti-lock brakes). Additional changes include loss of aerodynamic grip via smaller front splitter and rear diffuser, stiffer roll cages, an Earnhardt bar (anti-intrusion bars on the windscreen), and side window nets on both sides, both of which are required in the Rolex Series. As per the rules, NASCAR specified Continental tyres are used. Compared to the Audi R8 LMS ultra, the R8 Grand AM has lower down force. This model made its debut at the 50th Daytona 24 Hours in January 2012.

== Special models ==
=== Audi R8 V12 TDI concept (2008) ===
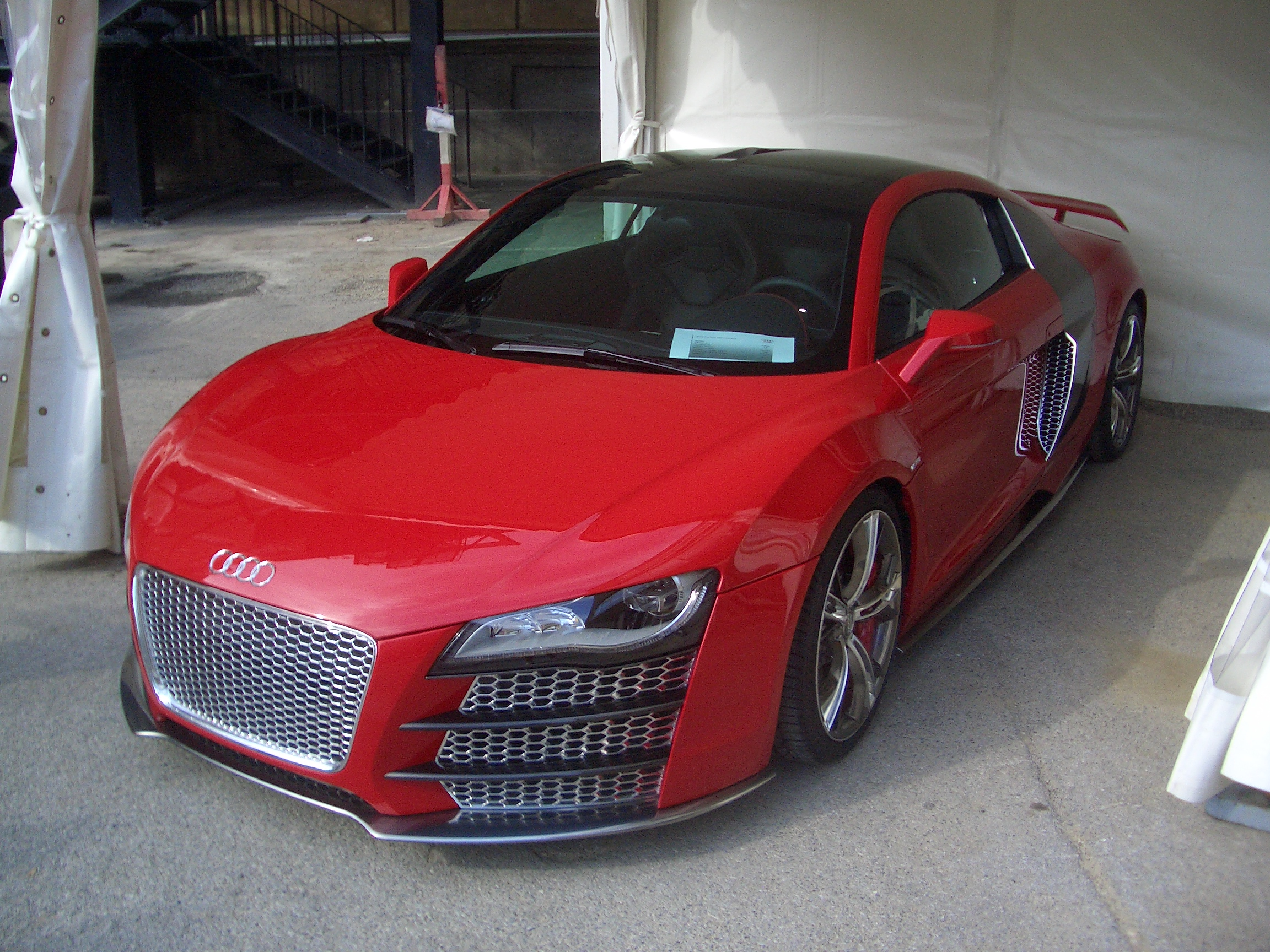
Audi R8 TDI Le Mans

The R8 V12 TDI (later renamed the R8 TDI Le Mans) is a concept car based on the R8 V8 coupé with a 5,934 cc (5.934 L; 362.1 cu in) twin-turbocharged V12 Diesel engine rated at 500 PS (368 kW; 493 hp) and 1,000 N⋅m (738 lb⋅ft) of torque at 1,750–3,000 rpm with Euro 6 emissions standard compliance via oxidizing catalyst and Diesel particulate filter, matt Grace Silver and brilliant red metallic body colours, 6-speed manual transmission with small-diameter double-plate clutch and quattro permanent all-wheel drive system with a ratio of 40:60 front and rear.

The car also had many unique body features such as rhombus-pattern cover on the air inlets and outlets, continuous aluminum lip spoiler, glass roof with two large transparent sections, glazed engine compartment behind the seats, NACA duct in the middle of the roof for cooling of the bigger V12 engine, optional carbon fibre lining of the engine compartment, LED headlights with color temperature of 6,000 kelvin, 365 mm (14.37 in) three-spoke flat bottom diecast magnesium core sports steering wheel upholstered in Valcona leather, aluminum application on the center console, 24-piston (total) brake calipers (red six-piston monobloc aluminum front calipers, fixed six-piston rear calipers) and ventilated carbon fibre reinforced silicon carbide ceramic brake discs.

The R8 TDI LeMans was unveiled first at the Detroit Auto Show in 2008 and then at the 2008 Geneva Motor Show. The development of the R8 TDI was cancelled, Audi cited the reason that the cost of re-engineering of the petrol R8 to accommodate the bigger twin-turbocharged diesel engine was simply too great, and that it would be unable to recoup its investment through sales alone.

=== R8 e-tron ===
==== e-tron concept (2009) ====
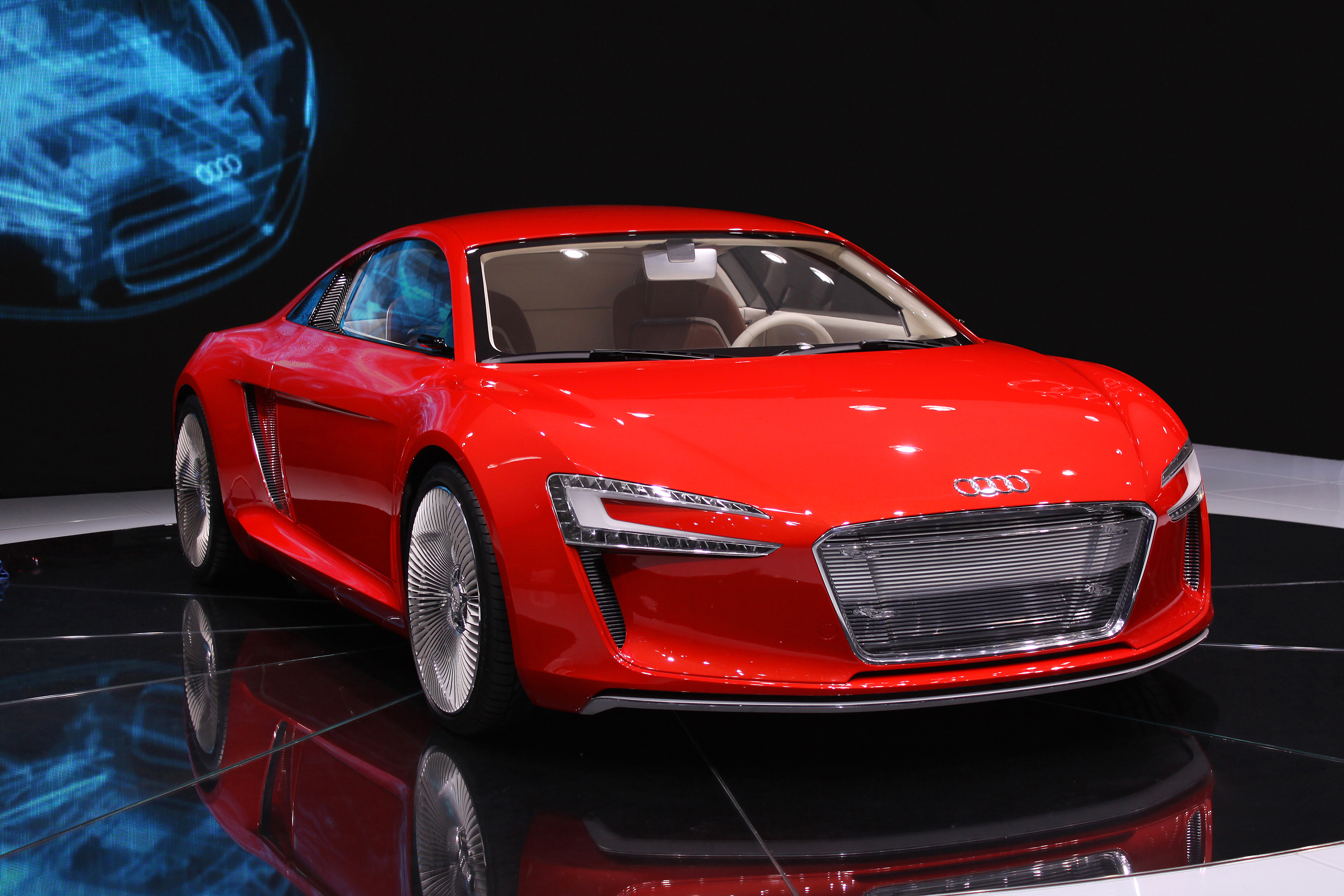
The Audi e-tron concept car was unveiled at the 2009 Frankfurt Motor Show.

The all-electric Audi e-tron concept car was unveiled at the 2009 Frankfurt Motor Show, followed by the 2009 LA Auto Show (in orange body colour), and at the 2010 24 Hours of Le Mans.

The Audi e-tron is a version of the R8 Coupé with a slightly smaller body utilising four electric motors rated at 317 PS (233 kW; 313 hp) and 450 N⋅m (332 lbf⋅ft) of torque. However the proposed torque rating is the torque measured at the wheels, not at the output shaft — as is the industry standard, the true torque rating is at around 678 N⋅m (500 lbf⋅ft). Other features included a 42.4 kWh liquid cooled lithium-ion battery pack, a need-based energy management system, LED technology used for all lighting units, independent cooling system for each axle; doors, covers, sidewalls and roof made from carbon fibre-reinforced plastic; 3-mode flush gear selector (forward, reverse and neutral), instrument cluster with fold-out central display with integrated Audi MMI functions, climate control unit located to the right above the steering wheel, racing-inspired lightweight bucket seats, snow white and cognac interior colours, heat pump, climate control system; triangular double wishbones at the front axle and trapezoidal wishbones made of forged aluminum components at the rear axle, direct rack-and-pinion steering with speed-sensitive electromechanical steering boost, 235/35R19 front and 295/30R19 rear tires with a new blade design and the prototype version of an information processing system (car-to-x communication).

Claimed performance figures for the R8 e-tron is a 0–100 km/h (0–62 mph) acceleration time of 4.8 seconds and a limited top speed of 200 km/h (124 mph). The car has a limited all-electric range of 248 km (154 miles). A full charge at 230 volts takes six to eight hours, while a 400-volt quick charger would reduce the charge time to about two and a half hours. Braking is accomplished and energy is recaptured through the electric motors’ regenerative function, unless the car detects more aggressive deceleration is required, at that point a conventional electromechanical system featuring carbon-ceramic discs starts functioning to assist. The battery pack and its necessary inverter and power accoutrements weigh about 472 kg (1,040 lb), or nearly a third of the E-Tron's approximately 1,588 kg (3,500 lb) curb weight achieved by the excessive use of carbon fibre, magnesium and aluminium. The car has a weight distribution of 42% at the front and 58% at the rear.

==== R8 e-tron prototype (2011) ====
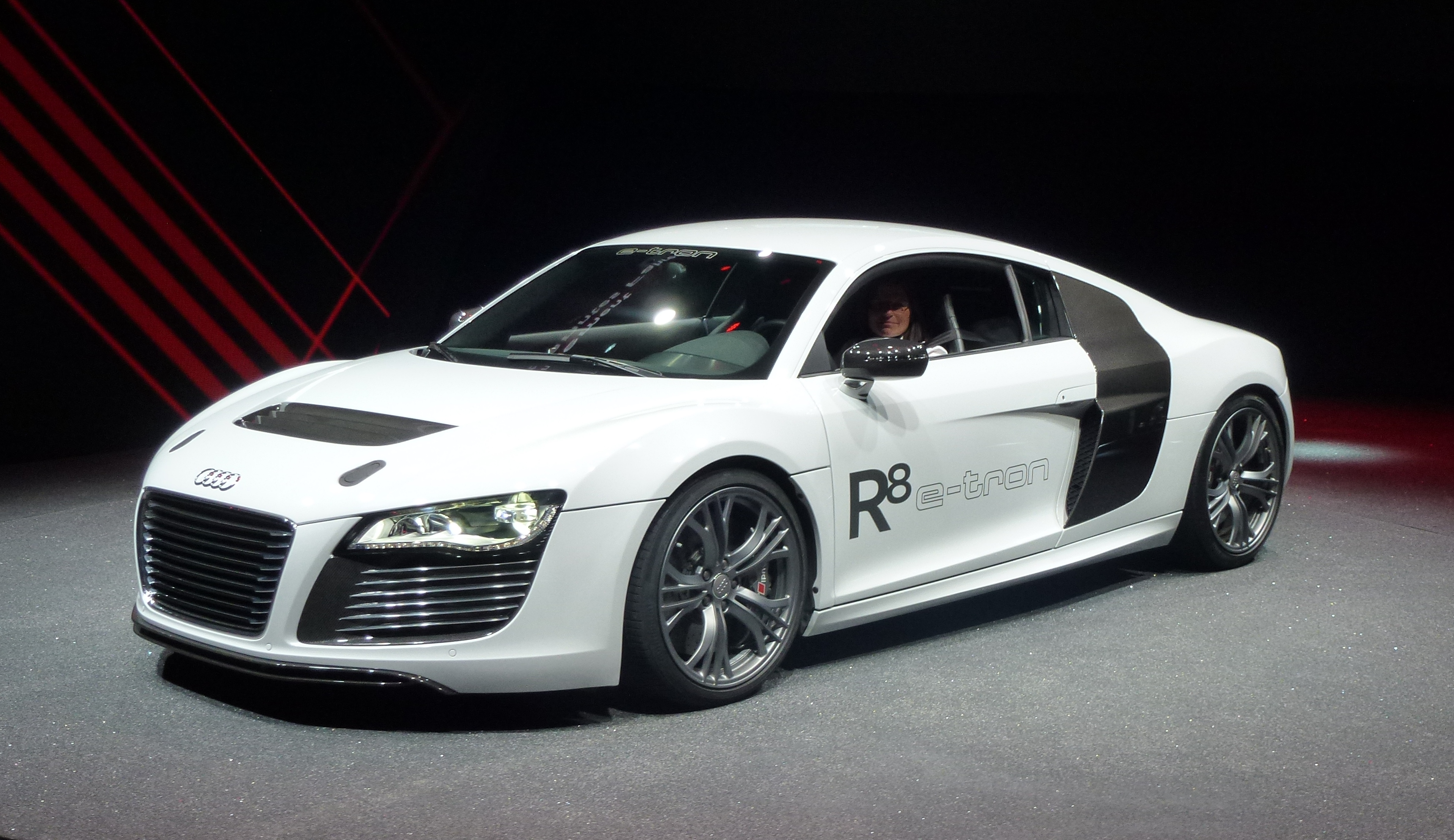
Audi R8 e-tron prototype at the 2011 Frankfurt Motor Show

Audi originally announced the first e-tron model to be built by quattro GmbH at Neckarsulm, with a small production run beginning in late 2012. Keeping that announcement in place, Audi unveiled the R8 e-tron prototype at the 2011 Frankfurt Motor Show.

Features included two permanent magnet synchronous motors at the rear axle rated 381 PS (280 kW; 376 hp) and 820 N⋅m (604.80 lb⋅ft) of total torque, a torque vectoring system, electric single-wheel anti-slip regulation, Multimaterial space Frame chassis with increased use of carbon-fibre-reinforced plastic, springs made from fiberglass-reinforced plastic, wheel hubs made of forged titanium, anti-roll bar boasts made from hybrid aluminum and carbon fibre, 19-inch wheels with friction-optimized 225-35 series tires, 48.6 kWh lithium-ion battery beneath the passenger cabin as structural element, Crescendo Red Metallic body colour, fine chrome horizontal struts on the grille, e-tron-specific LED headlamp design, diffuser at the rear, 7-inch Multi Media Interface display, 6.7-inch AMOLED (Active Matrix Organic Light Emitting Diode) optic rear-view mirror system, leather and Alcantara upholstery, e-sound artificial engine noise emitting from a speaker system mounted in the underbody that is audible outside the car at speeds under 60 km/h (37 mph).

The prototype was based on the standard R8 and followed closely the original concept, with a shape reminiscent of existing V8 and V10 petrol-powered versions. Audi claimed the production version of the R8 e-tron was capable of a 0–100 km/h (62 mph) acceleration time of around 4.8 seconds, making it only 0.2 seconds slower than the R8 V8. Top speed was to be limited to 200 km/h (124 mph) to protect the charge of the battery making the performance figures true to the concept. It was planned to be put into production in early 2012. Along with the R8 e-tron, Audi also considered a small-scale production of a smaller and lighter zero-emission sports car based on the second e-tron concept displayed at the 2010 Detroit Motor Show.

==== Development ====
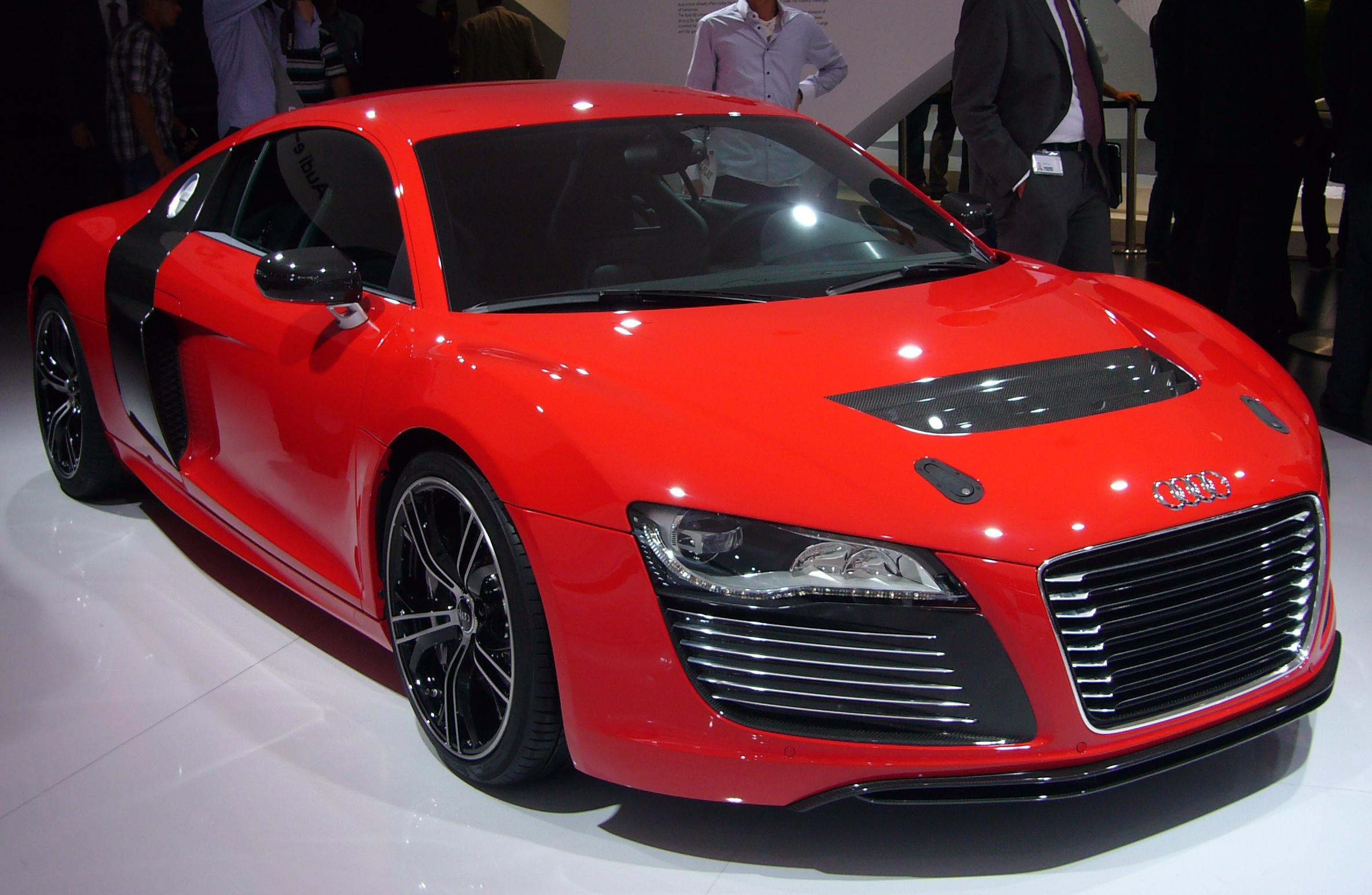
Audi R8 e-tron at the 2011 Frankfurt Motor show

In 2010, Audi began a development program with the objective to manufacture the R8 e-tron in limited numbers. On June 26, 2012, one of the earliest R8 e-tron prototypes set a new electric car lap record at the Nürburgring racetrack with a time of 8:09.099.

In May 2013, after developing 10 prototypes for research and development purposes, Audi decided to put the production of the electric car on hold due to its limited all-electric range as battery technology did not advance as fast as Audi had initially expected, making the R8 e-tron unviable for series production.

In March 2014, Audi revised its decision and announced it will build the R8 e-tron upon customer request. The company explained that their latest development work resulted in an increased range from 215 km (134 mi) to approximately 450 km (280 mi). The limited production R8 e-tron was based on the second generation of the R8 platform shared with the Lamborghini Huracán.

=== R8 NF ===
The "NF" (i.e. "Nachfolger" or simply "successor") prototype is a lightweight variant of the R8 with excessive use of the lightweight carbon fibre-reinforced polymer. The R8 NF was featured online describing the proliferation of carbon-fibre in vehicles such as the R8 and highlighted the carbon-fibre engine cover on the R8 Spyder, the roof of the R8-based E-Tron and the various pieces found on the limited-run R8 GT, amongst others. The prototype of the R8 NF was reported to be up 20% (325 kg (717 lb)) lighter than an aluminum-bodied R8. The R8 NF was presented to the public in Audi's lightweight research and production plant in Neckarsulm, Germany.

=== R8 V8 Limited Edition (2011–2012) ===
The R8 Limited Edition is a limited production variant of the R8 Coupé 4.2 FSI quattro developed for the UK market, commemorating the tenth victory for Audi in 24 Hours of Le Mans. Changes included a titanium body colour option (no-cost optional metallic and pearl effect paint options, Titanium Metallic at cost), titanium finish 19-inch '5-arm double-spoke Y design' alloy wheels (from R8 GT Coupe), red brake callipers, satellite navigation, the Audi Music Interface (AMI), an interior light package, a premium Bang and Olufsen sound system, mobile phone preparation via a Bluetooth interface with integrated seat-belt microphones, Audi magnetic ride adaptive suspension system, Black Fine Nappa Leather-upholstered seats and headrests with crimson red accents and red contrast stitching, red stitching on leather-covered multi-function steering wheel and instrument cowl, crimson red leather upholstery on monoposto, knee pads and passenger door handle in red leather, floor mats have a red surround and feature the R8 logo in silver, stainless steel pedals and illuminated door sills with bright aluminium inserts carrying the R8 logo, optional Carbon Package (carbon sigma sideblades, door mirrors, monoposto, inlays and door sill trims, illuminated engine bay), bespoke R8 Driving Experience at Silverstone Circuit. The R8 Limited Edition was available to order from July 2011, with deliveries beginning in October of the same year. Production was limited to 100 units.

=== R8 V10 Limited Edition (2012) ===
Unveiled at the 2011 Guangzhou Auto Show, the R8 V10 Limited Edition is a limited production variant of the R8 V10 Coupé developed for the Chinese market with a limited production run of 30 units. Notable changes included a Nordic gold body colour, front and rear air intakes/outlets and lightweight tailpipes are in matt black, front and rear slats and rear bumper (partially) in matt titanium grey; front spoiler, flics, sideblades, exterior mirrors, a fixed rear wing, an enlarged rear diffuser in carbon matt; radiator grille in matt black; radiator grille surround and bars in matt titanium grey, 19-inch wheels in 5 twin-spoke "Y" design finished in titanium paint, an aluminum gear knob with limited edition number from 1 up to 30 without number 4, 14 and 24; sports bucket seats in black Alcantara with contrasting stitching and piping in trim colour, headlining in Alcantara with contrasting stitching, knee pad in shark skin black with contrast stitching, centre console inlays and door trim inserts in body colour, monoposto and door pulls use inlays in carbon matt, doors and centre console are in body colour, instrument cluster with black dials and R8 emblem, door sill trims with aluminium insert and R8 logo, R tronic transmission.

=== F12 (2012) ===
The F12 is an electric variant of the R8 Coupé designed by Audi Electronics Venture in collaboration with Robert Bosch GmbH, Bosch Engineering GmbH and 3 institutes at the RWTH Aachen University (Institute of Automotive Engineering (ika), Institute for Power Electronics and Electrical Drives (ISEA), Institute of Electrical Machines (IEM)). Notable features include two separate blocks of 200-macrocell battery with total 38 kWh charge, front axle synchronous motor and rear axle asynchronous motors rated at 204 PS (150 kW; 201 hp) and 550 N⋅m (406 lb⋅ft) of torque a DC/DC converter, heat pump, user-programmable instrument cluster. The car's basic drive functions – Park, Reverse, Neutral and Drive – are performed by operating buttons on the center tunnel. All other operations are controlled via a tablet computer that can be removed from the center console.

=== R8 Exclusive Selection Editions (2012) ===
R8 Exclusive Selection Editions are limited production variants of the 2012 R8 Coupé 4.2 FSI quattro (20 units) and 2012 R8 Coupé 5.2 FSI quattro (30 units) developed for the US market. Notable changes for the V8 model include Daytona Gray matte body colour, carbon fibre exterior splitter and diffuser, 19-inch titanium five-arm double spoke wheels, black grille surrounds, black exhaust finishers, R8 GT tail lamps, red brake calipers, exclusive leather package with Crimson Red elements and contrast stitching, exclusive leather Navigation surround, a thicker contoured leather multifunctional steering wheel, carbon fibre elements, Bang & Olufsen Sound System and Navigation with the Audi Music Interface. Notable changes for the V10 model include Ibis white exterior and Brilliant Black features (sideblade, exterior mirrors, rear license plate surround), R8 GT tail lamps, 19-inch bi-color e-tron wheels, Ibis interior upholstery with Alabaster White contrast stitching, carbon fiber monoposto driver's cockpit, exclusive leather Navigation surround and contoured steering wheel. Transmission choices for both models included a six-speed manual or the R-tronic automated manual transmission.

=== R8 China Edition (2012) ===
The China Edition is a limited production variant of the R8 Coupé 5.2 FSI quattro developed for the Chinese market. Changes included a choice of two body colors (Malibu blue body with Suzuka grey rocker panel side blades, or Suzuka grey body with Malibu blue side blades), 19-inch high-gloss black wheel hubs in a five twin-spoke "Y" design, fixed spoiler in carbon matte, shark skin upholstery with colored stitching, handbrake and steering wheel wrapped in Alcantara, instrument shield in carbon matte, aluminum gear knob engraved with characters "R8 专享", removal of the numeral "4" from the serial numbers (as it is considered an unlucky number in China), seat heating function and the R-tronic automated manual transmission. Production was limited to 80 units.

=== R8 LMX (2014) ===
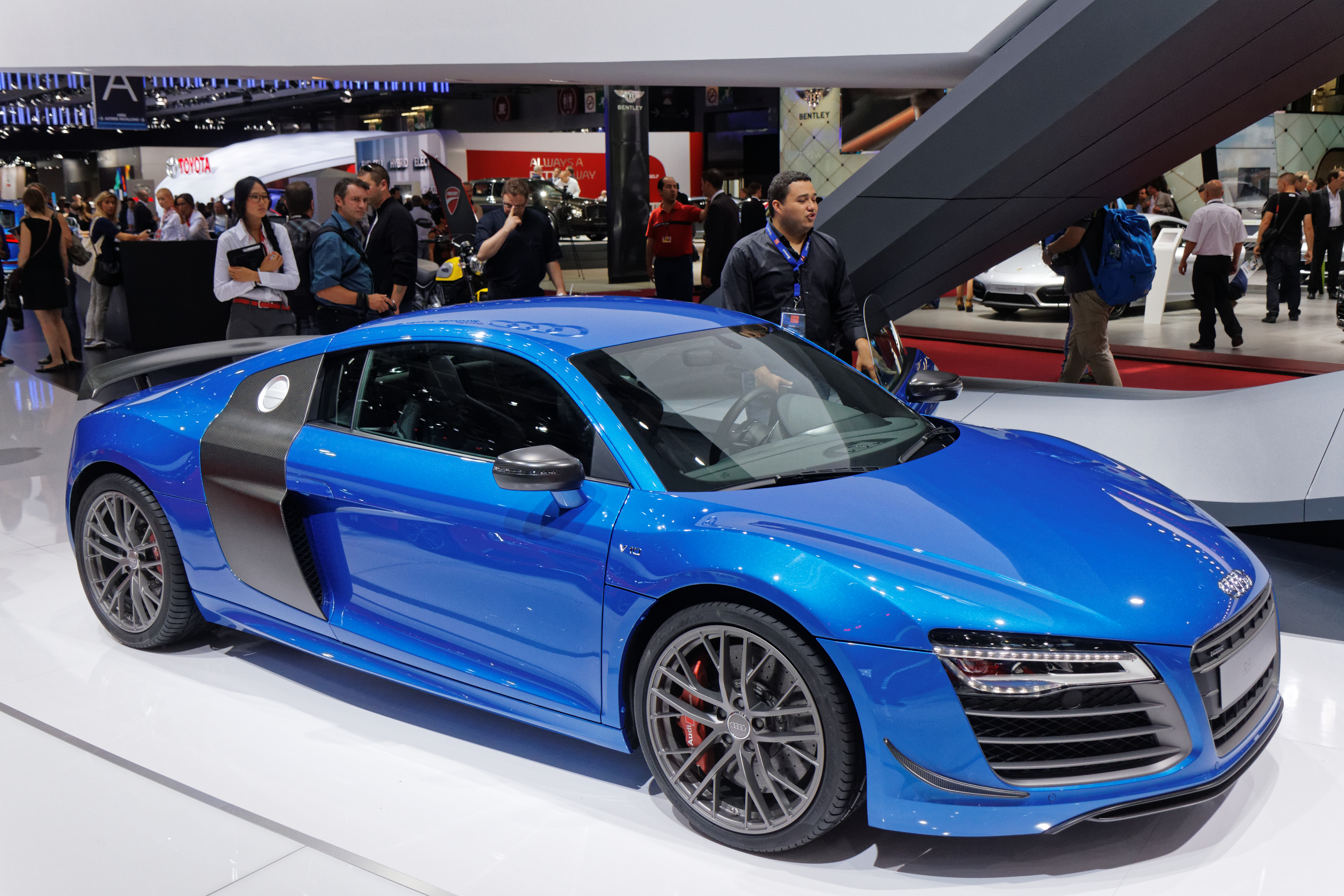
Audi R8 LMX

Unveiled at the 2014 24 Hours of Le Mans, the R8 LMX is a limited variant of the Audi R8 V10 5.2 FSI quattro coupé with LED and laser high beams module shared with the Audi R18 e‑tron quattro with four 450 nanometer 5,500 Kelvin laser diodes per module, increased engine power to 570 PS (419 kW; 562 hp) and 540 N⋅m (398 lb⋅ft) of torque, 7-speed S Tronic dual-clutch transmission, carbon‑fiber ceramic brake discs (380 mm (15.0 in) front), red anodized brake calipers, 19‑inch wheels with 235/35 R 19 front and 305/30 R 19 rear tyres, exclusive Ara Blue body colour, a fixed rear spoiler, matte carbon fiber‑reinforced polymer front spoiler lip, side flics, engine compartment cover, exterior mirror housings, sideblades, rear wing and the diffuser; singleframe grille, front air inlet grilles, rear outlet grille finished in titanium gray; sport exhaust system with high-gloss black tailpipes, black interior with blue accents, folding bucket seats upholstered in Nappa leather with Sepang Blue diamond pattern, backrest covers in Ara Blue, Sepang Blue stitching at parking brake lever, center tunnel console, steering wheel and the instrument cowl; black Alcantara headlining, black Nappa leather door trim, center tunnel console, parking brake lever, inlays in the doors, arc around the cockpit in matte carbon; illuminated aluminum inlays integrated into the CFRP door sill trims, selector lever for the S Tronic and knee pads upholstered in Nappa leather, floor mats with black piping and Sepang Blue stitching. The R8 LMX was available for sale in early 2014.

=== R8 Competition (2015) ===
As the first-generation production for the R8 was coming to an end, Audi unveiled at the 2014 Los Angeles Auto Show the final version in the limited-edition 2015 R8 Competition – the most powerful production vehicle ever made by the company at the time. Only 60 examples of the Competition were produced for the USA. This version was more than just a trim package since power from the normal 5.2-liter V10 was revised to develop 570 horsepower, an extra 20 hp over the V10 Plus, and reached 8,800 rpm for redline. The only available transmission was the seven-speed, dual clutch S-Tronic gearbox, which allowed for downshifts with race car like exhaust overrun noises out of the standard sports exhaust. 0 to 60 miles per hour was manufacturer rated to 3.2 seconds, even though actual measured times were slightly faster. The advertised maximum velocity was achieved at 199 mph. Carbon-ceramic brake disks with red calipers were standard. Audi took inspiration from the R8 LMS Ultra race car for the development of the Competition and applied many qualities to the street version. Unique to this version were matte carbon fiber pieces replacing the rear spoiler, mirror housings, side blades, front spoiler and rear diffuser. The 60 cars went through Audi Exclusive so buyers could specify their own specific interior and exterior colors. All cars also had interior matte carbon fiber trim over the center console and illuminated doorsills. Retail pricing started over $200,000 USD.

=== HN R200 (2015) ===
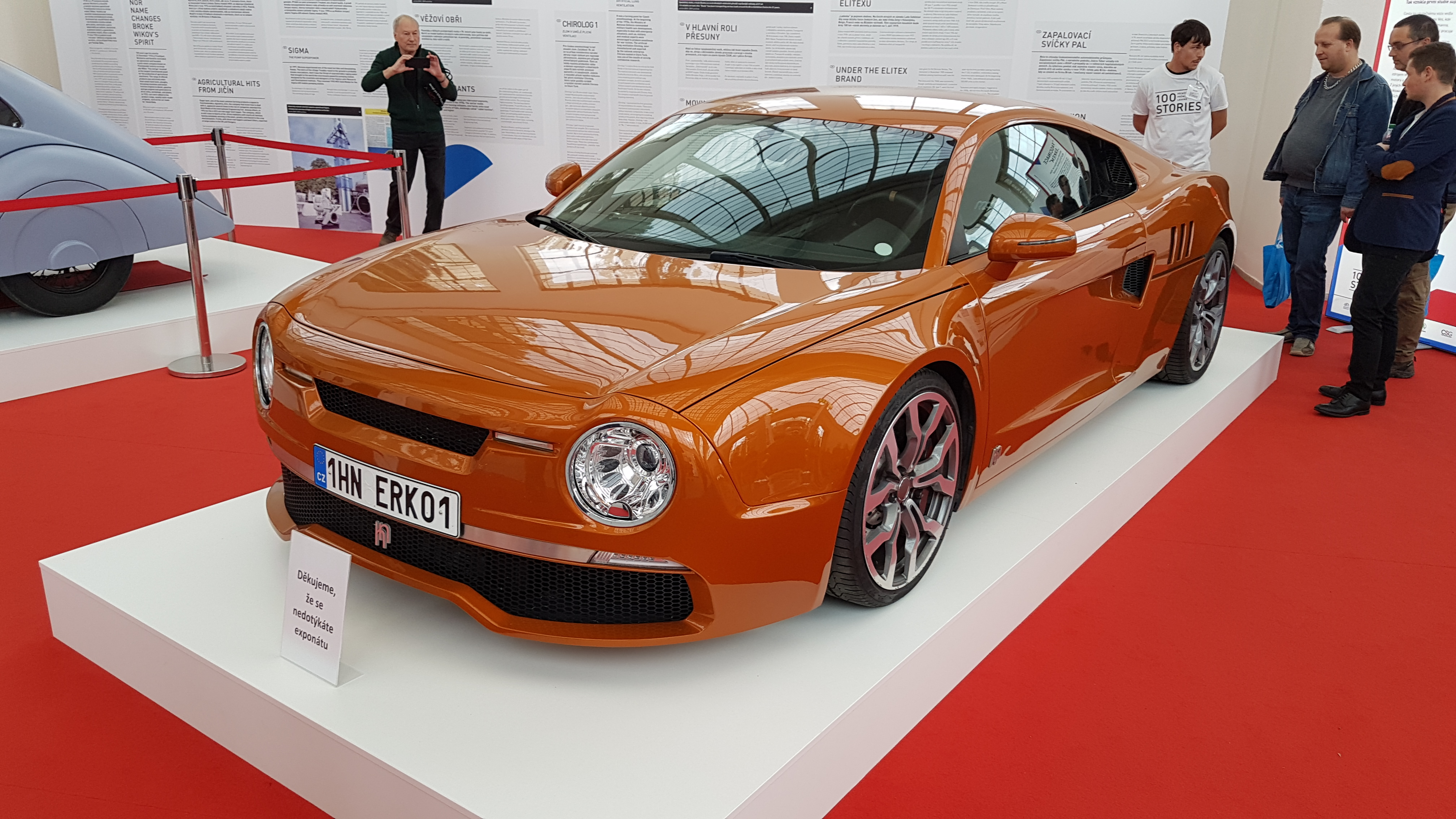
HN R200 at the Brno Exhibition Centre

The HN (Hoffman&Novague) R200 was a rebodied Audi R8 designed by Škoda enthusiast Petr Novague as a tribute to the Skoda 130 RS. The car was built by Metal Hoffman and used headlights from the Bentley Mulsanne and tail lights from the Lamborghini Gallardo, as well as various other components sourced from the Volkswagen Group, and featured the same 430 bhp, V8 engine from the R8. Despite ambitions of producing up to 30 examples, three cars had been produced as of 2019.

== Facelift (Autumn 2012) ==
Changes for the facelift models include:

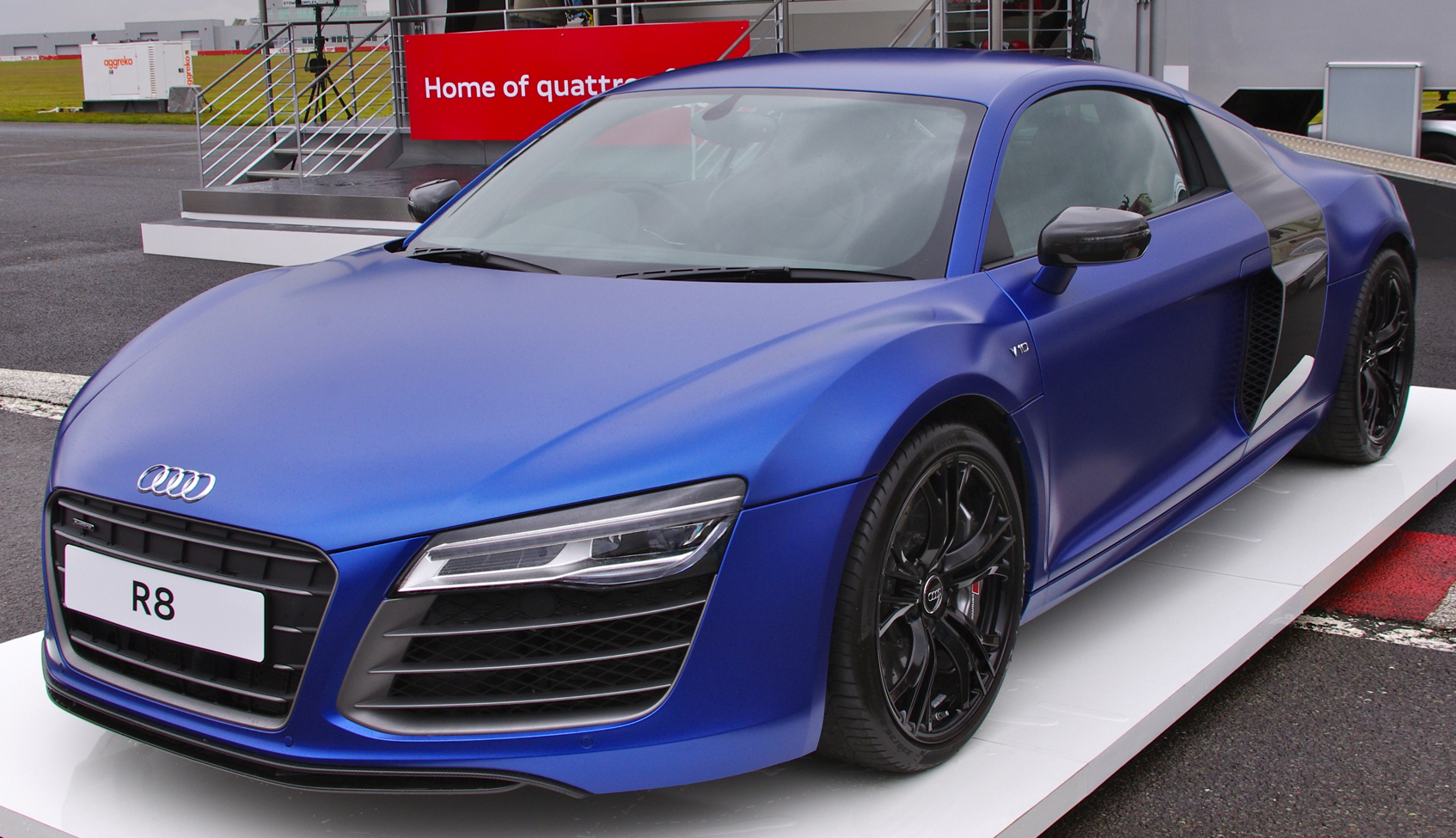
Audi R8 V10 (post 2013 facelift)

- New single-frame grille with the beveled upper corners is painted high-gloss black, with horizontal chrome inserts adorning the struts on the V10 variants.
- New bumper with the air inlets bearing three crossbars each (optional front splitter in carbon fiber reinforced plastic).
- LED headlights are now standard on all variants of the Audi R8.
- Vent louvers next to the rear window having a matte black look on the R8 V10 Coupé (aluminum on the R8 V8 Coupé).
- 7-speed S-Tronic dual-clutch transmission replaced the R-Tronic automated manual transmission (S-Tronic later became standard on all V10 powered models).
- Audi magnetic ride adaptive damping standard on the R8 V10 and optional for the V8 variants; offering a normal mode and a sports mode.
- V8 engine models having the standard wheel dimensions of 8.5 J x 18 at the front and 10.5 J x 18 at the rear, with tire sizes 235/40 and 285/35. V10 models having 19-inch wheels of widths 8.5 and 11 inches; tyres having the sizes of 235/35 and 295/30 respectively.
- Electronically adjustable sports seats optional on the V8 models and standard on the V10 models (R8 Spyder seats include a special pigmentation reducing heating from direct sunlight).
- Centre console and the handbrake lever covered with leather upholstery, adorned by delicate seams; in the V10 models the molding around the standard navigation system plus is also leather-covered.
- R8 V10 and the R8 V10 plus come with the navigation system plus and the Bang & Olufsen Sound System as standard on-board features.

The R8 V10 plus (introduced in 2012 and available only as a coupé) includes:

- Front splitter in carbon fiber reinforced plastic (CFRP).
- Housings of the outside mirrors and the side blades (lateral air inlets) made from CFRP.
- Standard vent louvers next to the rear window in matte black.
- LEDs illuminate the engine compartment with a partial CFRP lining for the engine compartment
- Plus rear diffusor in CFRP
- Tailpipe trim sections in black
- Matt effect body colour option
- Dry weight 1,570 kg (3,461.26 lb)
- V10 engine rated at 550 PS (405 kW; 542 hp) at 8,000rpm and 540 N⋅m (398.28 lb⋅ft) of torque at 6,500rpm
- Sport-tuned shock absorbers and camber values at the front axle
- 19-inch 5-double spoke Y design wheels with titanium finish (optional black gloss)
- Cross-drilled & ventilated Audi ceramic brakes
- Standard bucket seats with prominent side sections
- Upholstery inlays in Carbon Sigma finish
- Door sills in Carbon Sigma finish

Other options for all R8 variants included a high-beam assistant, a stowage package, various travel case sets, a cell phone preparation with belt microphone and voice control, and the parking system plus with reversing camera.

European models were delivered at the end of 2012. Early models included the R8 V8 (Coupé/Spyder), R8 V10 (Coupé/Spyder) and the R8 V10 plus (Coupé).

UK models went on sale as 2013 model year cars. The sales began in August 2012, with deliveries beginning in early 2013.

US models went on sale in April 2013 as 2014 model year cars. Early models include R8 V8 (Coupé/Spyder), R8 V10 (Coupé/Spyder) and the R8 V10 plus (Coupé).

Japanese models went on sale in August 2013. Early models include R8 V8 (Coupé) and the R8 V10 (Coupé/Spyder).

The updated model was unveiled at the 2013 Geneva Motor Show, followed by 2013.

== Specifications ==
=== Road models ===
Models	R8 Coupé 4.2 FSI quattro	R8 Spyder 4.2 FSI quattro	R8 Coupé 5.2 FSI quattro	R8 Spyder 5.2 FSI quattro	R8 GT	R8 GT Spyder	R8 Competition / R8 LMX
Engine
Configuration, Displacement	4,163 cc (4.2 L) 32 valve DOHC V8		5,204 cc (5.2 L) Odd firing 40 valve DOHC V10				5,204 cc (5.2 L) Odd firing 40 valve DOHC V10
Power at rpm	420 PS (309 kW; 414 hp) at 7,800 2007 - 2010 430 PS (316 kW; 424 hp) at 7,900 2010 - 2015	430 PS (316 kW; 424 hp) at 7,900 2010 - 2015	525 PS (386 kW; 518 hp) at 8,000 2009 - 2015 550 PS (405 kW; 542 hp) at 8,000 2012 -15	560 PS (412 kW; 552 hp) at 8,000	560 PS (412 kW; 552 hp) at 8,000	560 PS (412 kW; 552 hp) at 8,000	570 PS (419 kW; 562 hp) at 8,500
Torque at rpm	430 N⋅m (317 lb⋅ft) at 4,500-6,000	430 N⋅m (317 lb⋅ft) at 4,500-6,000	530 N⋅m (391 lb⋅ft) at 6,500	530 N⋅m (391 lb⋅ft) at 6,500	540 N⋅m (398 lb⋅ft) at 6,500	540 N⋅m (398 lb⋅ft) at 6,500	540 N⋅m (398 lb⋅ft) at 5,800
Performance
0 to 100 km/h (62 mph) (seconds)	4.6 with R-Tronic or manual, 4.3 with S-Tronic	4.8	3.9 with R-Tronic or manual, 3.6 with S-Tronic, 3.5 with the "plus" - 550 PS version	4.1	3.6	3.8	3.2
0 to 200 km/h (120 mph) (seconds)	14.9	N/A	11.8	N/A	10.8	N/A	N/A
1/4 mile (0.40 km) (seconds)	12.5	N/A	11.5	N/A	11.5	(figures not known)	N/A
Top speed	301 km/h (187 mph)2007 - 2011 (MY2012: 302 km/h (188 mph))	299 km/h (186 mph)2010 - 2011 (MY2012: 300 km/h (186 mph))	316 km/h (196 mph)	313 km/h (194 mph)	320 km/h (199 mph)	317 km/h (197 mph)	320 km/h (199 mph)
Dimensions & weight
Length, width, height	4,431×1,904×1,252 mm (174.4×75.0×49.3 in)	N/A	4,434×1,930×1,252 mm (174.6×76.0×49.3 in)	N/A	4,434×1,930×1,242 mm (174.6×76.0×48.9 in)	4,434×2,029×1,234 mm (174.6×79.9×48.6 in) (mirror-mirror, closed roof)	4,434×1,930×1,242 mm (174.6×76.0×48.9 in)
Curb weight (S or R Tronic, manual -5 kg)	1,565 kg (3,450 lb) (MY2012: 1,640 kg (3,616 lb))	1,740 kg (3,836 lb)	1,625 kg (3,583 lb) (MY2012: 1,700 kg (3,748 lb))	1,800 kg (3,968 lb)	1,525 kg (3,362 lb) (MY2012: 1,600 kg (3,527 lb))	1,640 kg (3,616 lb) (MY2012: 1,715 kg (3,781 lb))	1,500 kg (3,307 lb)

=== Race models ===
Models	R8 LMS (2011 GT3)	R8 LMS ultra (2012 GT3)	R8 GRAND-AM (2012)
Engine
Configuration, Displacement	5,200 cc (5.2 L) 32 valve DOHC V8	5,200 cc (5.2 L) Odd firing 40 valve DOHC V10	
Power output	496 to 570 PS (365 to 419 kW; 489 to 562 hp)	570 PS (419 kW; 562 hp)	
Torque	500 N⋅m (369 lb⋅ft)	over 500 N⋅m (369 lb⋅ft)	
Dimensions & Weight
Length, Width, Height	4,475×1,994×1,195 mm (176.2×78.5×47.0 in) (closed roof)	4,670×1,994×1,195 mm (183.9×78.5×47.0 in)	4,470×1,994×1,195 mm (176.0×78.5×47.0 in)
Curb weight (S or R Tronic, manual -5 kg)	1,290 kg (2,843.96 lb)*	1,250 kg (2,755.78 lb) (minimum)	1,280 kg (2,821.92 lb) (minimum)

=== Transmissions ===
Models	Types
R8 Coupé 4.2 FSI quattro	6-speed manual, 6-speed R Tronic automated manual (2008–2012), 7-speed S-Tronic dual-clutch automatic (2012–2015)
R8 Spyder 4.2 FSI quattro	6-speed manual, 6-speed R Tronic automated manual (2008–2012), 7-speed S-Tronic dual-clutch automatic (2012–2015)
R8 Coupé 5.2 FSI quattro	6-speed manual, 6-speed R Tronic automated manual (2007–2012), 7-speed S-Tronic dual-clutch automatic (2012–2015)
R8 Spyder 5.2 FSI quattro	6-speed manual, 6-speed R Tronic automated manual (2007–2012), 7-speed S-Tronic dual-clutch automatic (2012–2015)
R8 GT	6-speed R-Tronic automated manual
R8 GT Spyder	6-speed R-Tronic automated manual
R8 Competition	7-speed S-Tronic dual-clutch automatic (2015)
R8 e-tron	3-speed spur-gear ("straight-cut")
R8 LMS (2011 GT3)	6-speed sequential
R8 LMS ultra (2012 GT3)	pneumatically actuated 6-speed sequential sports transmission with paddle-shift
R8 GRAND-AM (2012)	pneumatically actuated 6-speed sequential sports transmission with paddle-shift

The transmission options are either a Lamborghini-sourced six-speed manual gearbox with metal gate for the shift lever, or an Audi-developed S or R Tronic gearbox—which is an automated manual, without a traditional clutch pedal, and with an automatic gear shifting mode.

=== Equipment ===
The R8 also features a distinctive curved bar of LED daytime running lamps (DRLs) mounted inside the xenon HID headlamp casings.

The R8, like most mid- or rear-engine designed sports cars, utilises wider wheels and tyres on its rear axle. For the 18-inch alloy wheels (on standard summer tyres), there is just one range of sizes—the fronts are sized at 8.5J×18H2 ET42, whilst the rears are two inches wider at 10.5Jx18H2 ET50. With the 19-inch wheels (standard fit in most markets), the theme continues—the fronts are all 8.5J×19H2 ET42, and the rears are 11.0Jx19H2 ET50. 19-inch wheels for the winter tyre package have a ½" narrower rear compared to the summer tyre wheel package. There is also a corresponding difference in tyre sizes—18's are 235/40 ZR18 95Y XL (eXtra Load) in front and 285/35 ZR18 101Y XL at the rear. For the 19-inch tyres, two different options are available—all fronts are 235/35 ZR19 91Y, and the rears are either 295/30 ZR19 100Y XL or 305/30 ZR19 102Y XL. Standard factory supplied tyre makes offered are either Continental SportContact3 or Pirelli P-Zero Rosso.

=== Other technical details ===
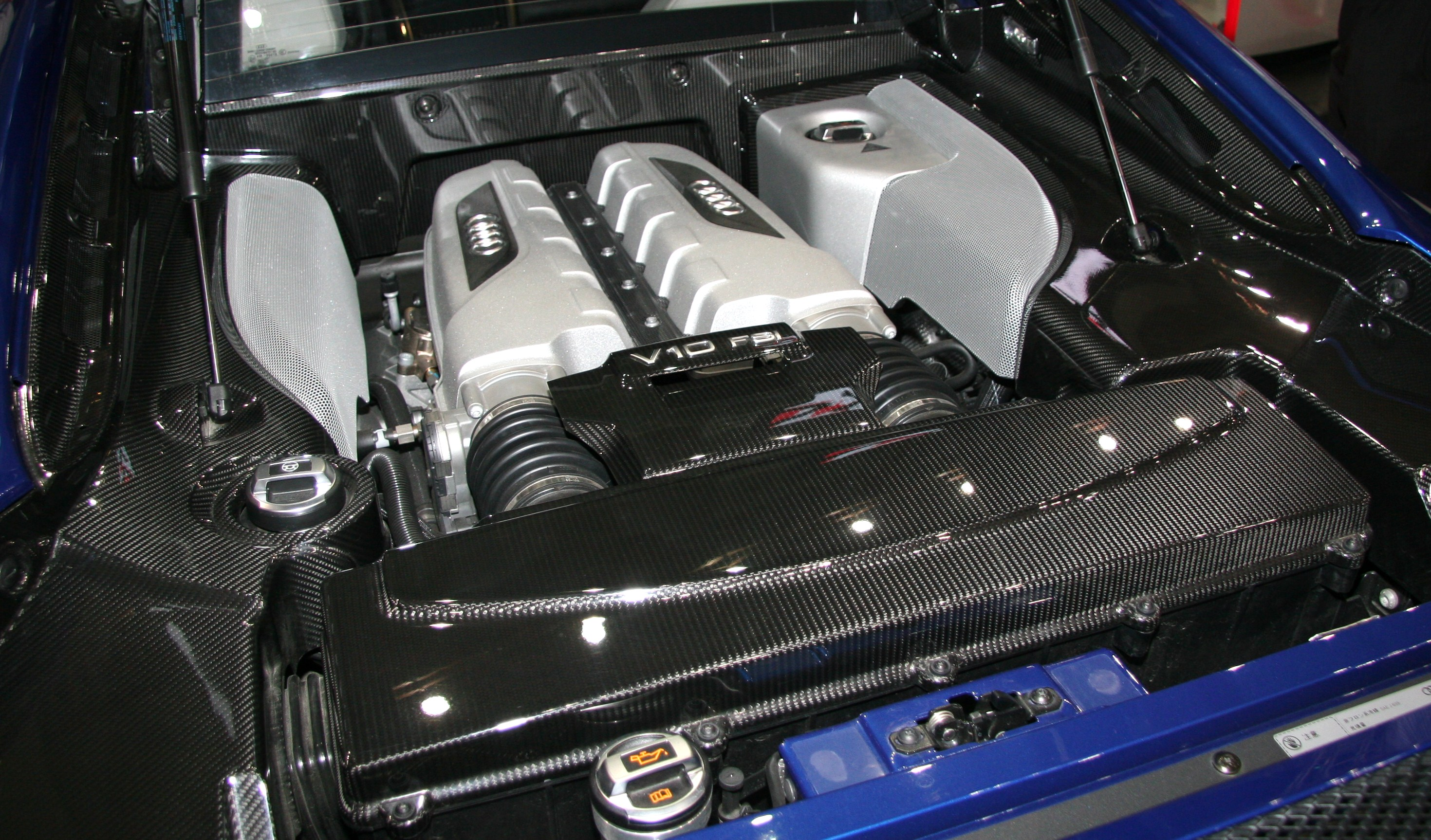
The V10 FSI engine in the R8 5.2 quattro

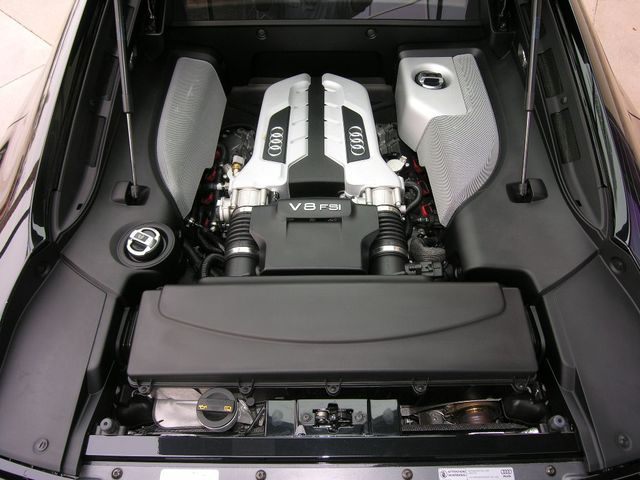
The V8 engine in the R8 4.2 quattro

As Volkswagen Group owns both Audi and Lamborghini (Automobili Lamborghini S.p.A.), some of the R8 is shared with the Lamborghini Gallardo, including some of the chassis and floorpan, door handle mechanisms, transmissions, and the revised V10 engine. The base R8 is made distinct by its German designed exterior styling, cabin, smaller V8 engine, magnetic dampers, and pricing.

The R8 (with the V8 engine) has a curb weight of 1,560 kg (3,439 lb). Its suspension system uses BWI Group's magnetorheological dampers.

Safety features include Bosch ESP 8.0 Electronic Stability Programme, which includes anti-lock braking system (ABS), electronic brakeforce distribution (EBD), Anti-Slip Regulation (ASR) and Electronic Differential Lock (EDL), front dual-stage airbags, and 'sideguard' curtain airbags.

== Motorsport history ==
=== R8 LMS (GT3) ===
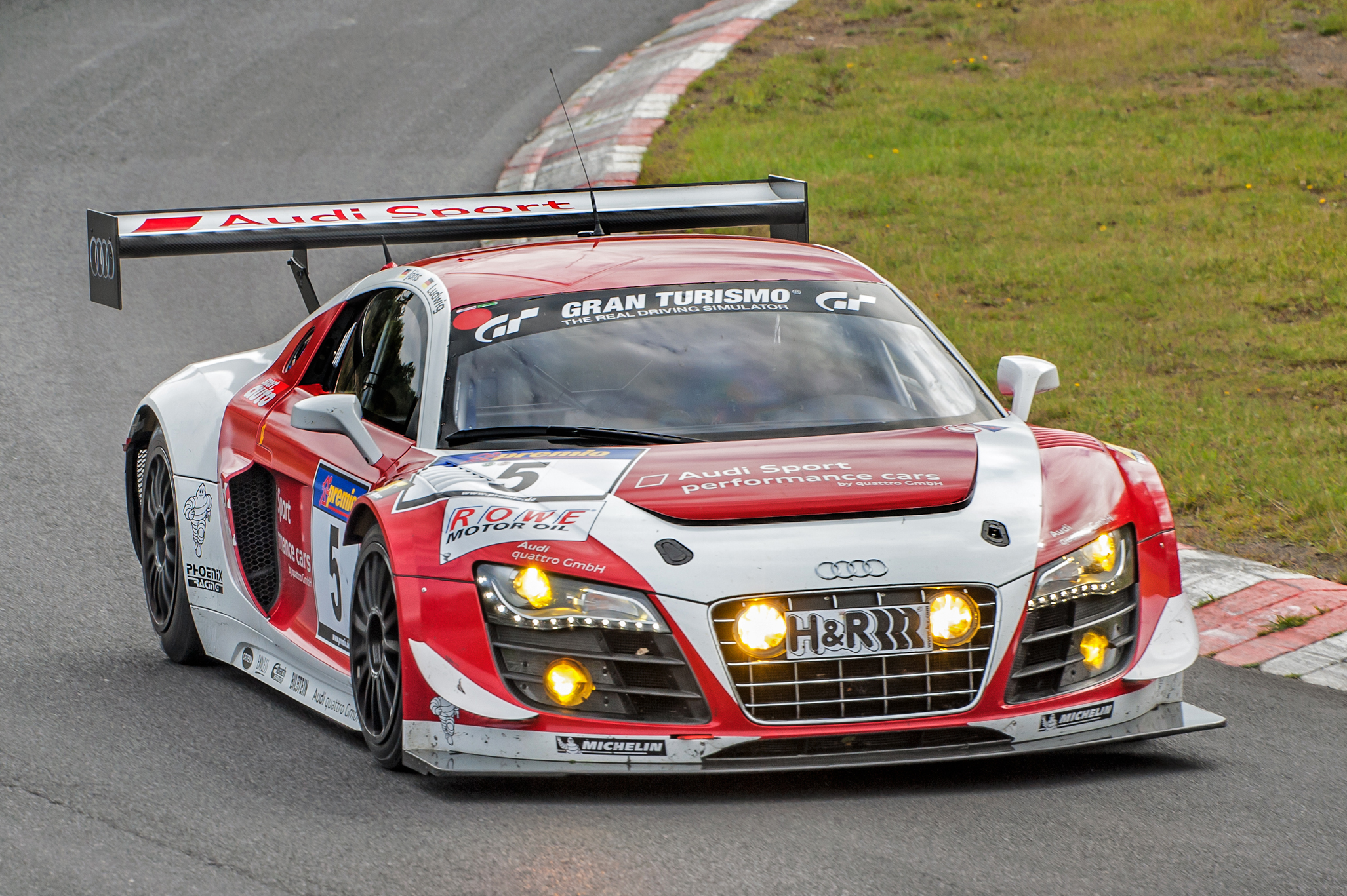
Audi R8 LMS

The first Audi R8 LMS (chassis number 101) was delivered to Audi Sport Italia in 2009.

Despite the development of the car, Audi itself had stated not to enter any races with the new GT3 car as an official 'factory' team. The car was unveiled at Essen Motor Show.

In the 2009 24 Hours Nürburgring, and preceding VLN endurance races, Audi privateer teams had entered four cars, operated by the Abt Sportsline and Nürburging-based Phoenix race teams. Until the 19th hour, two of these R8 remained challengers for the lead, against two Manthey-operated Porsche GT3 in the same lap, before the leading #99 car suffered suspension problems. The #97 finished 2nd, and despite electrical and gearbox problems, the other two cars finished 23rd or better.

Australian Mark Eddy participated in the 2010 Australian GT Championship with the first R8 LMS in the Southern Hemisphere. In the 2010 24 Hours Nürburgring, the first four spots on the grid were occupied by Audi R8.

Audi's Le Mans 24 Hour team, Joest Racing ran a pair of R8 LMS GT3's in the 2011 Bathurst 12 Hour held at the Mount Panorama Circuit, Bathurst, New South Wales, Australia on 6 February 2011. The #7 R8 driven by an all-Australian crew of Mark Eddy, multiple Bathurst 1000 winner Craig Lowndes and Warren Luff qualified on pole alongside teammates Marc Basseng, Christopher Mies and Darryl O'Young in the #8 car. Basseng, Mies and O'Young won the race from Eddy, Lowndes & Luff by just 0.71 seconds with Lowndes setting the races fastest lap and a new class lap record of 2:09.0861 for the 6.213 km long circuit on lap 267 of the 292 ran in the 12-hour time frame. FIA GT3 and Australian GT Championship cars were included in the 12 Hour for the first time in 2011. The race had previously been the domain of Group 3E Series Production Cars. Phoenix Racing returned to the event in 2012 and won the event again with Christopher Mies, Darryl O'Young and Christer Jöns.

Two Audi R8 LMS customer race cars purchased by Flying Lizard Motorsports entered the GT Daytona class of 2014 United SportsCar Championship. Testing took place in Sebring on 2013-11-16, with the first race for both Flying Lizard Audi R8 LMS cars taking place in 2014 Rolex 24 at Daytona.

Paul Miller Racing entered GT Daytona class of 2014 United SportsCar Championship with an Audi R8 LMS.

=== Audi R8 LMS ultra ===
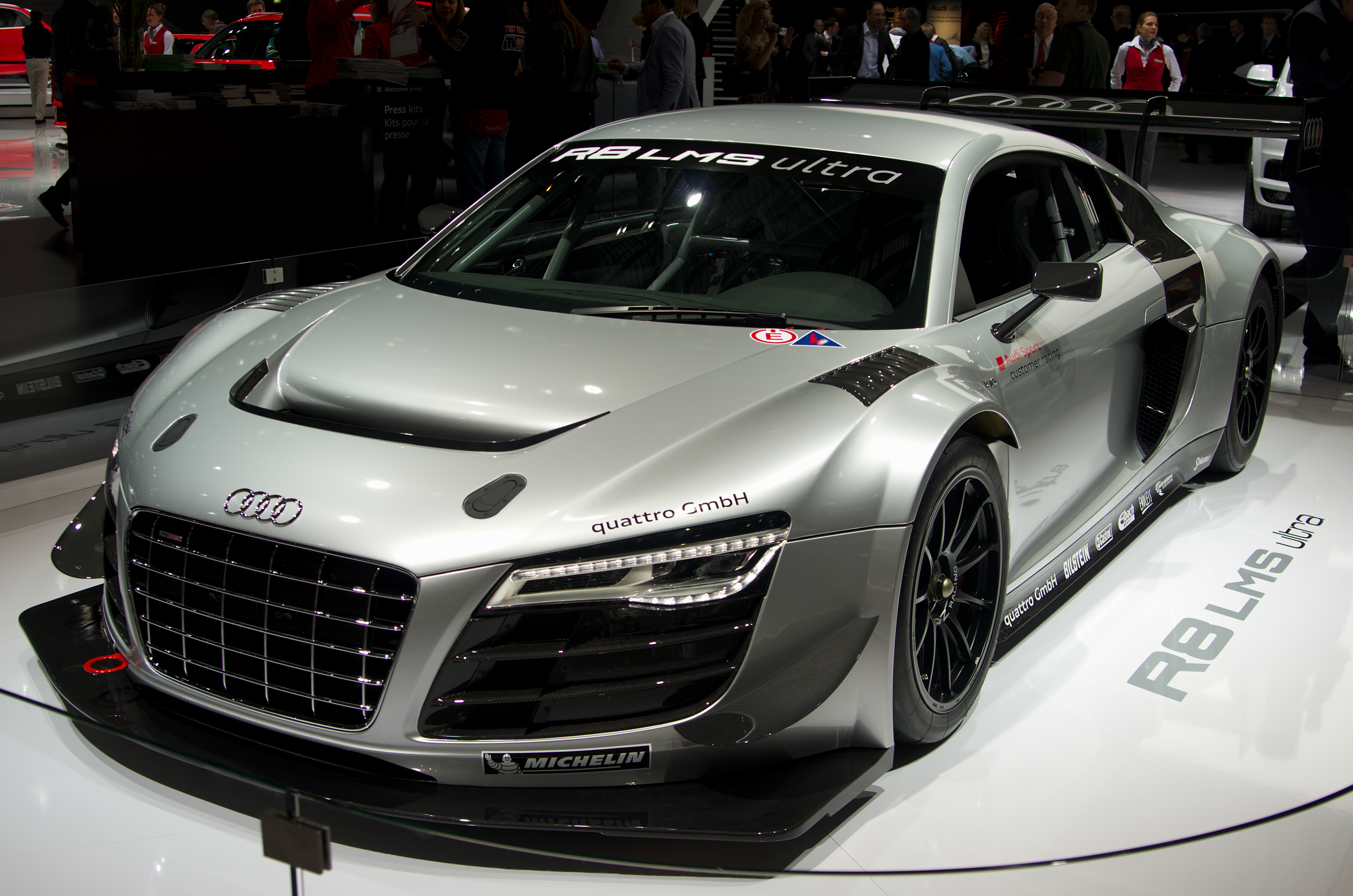
Audi R8 LMS Ultra

In the 2012 24 Hours of Nürburgring (the 40th edition of the race), Audi secured its first-ever victory and a 1-2 finish in the 24-hour classic with a Phoenix team consisting of Marc Basseng, Christopher Haase, Frank Stippler and Markus Winkelhock taking the top spot of the podium and Christian Abt, Michael Ammermüller, Armin Hahne and Christian Mamerow of the Mamerow racing team (which used a Mercedes-Benz SLS AMG last year) taking second.

Phoenix Racing went on to win the 2012 24 Hours of Spa in an Audi R8 LMS Ultra in the hands of Andrea Piccini, René Rast and Frank Stippler. They were closely followed by fellow Audi Sport team, W Racing Team. The R8 LMS Ultra in GT3 spec is capable of pulling 1.8g in corners and can accelerate from 0-60 mph (97 km/h) in 3.2s.

=== Audi R8 Grand-Am ===
In the 2012 Rolex Sports Car Series Rolex 24 at Daytona race, Team APR Motorsport finished in 31st place with its drivers Ian Baas (USA)/Nelson Canache (YV)/Dion von Moltke (ZA)/Dr. Jim Norman (USA)/Emanuele Pirro (I). Oryx Racing came home in 32nd place with Humaid Al Masaood (UAE)/Saeed Al Mehairi (UAE)/Steven Kane (GB). Both teams drove the 480 PS (353 kW; 473 bhp) version of the car.

In 2013, Audi won the GT class of the Rolex 24 in a 1-2 finish with Alex Job Racing (drivers Filipe Albuquerque, Oliver Jarvis, Edoardo Mortara and Dion von Moltke) and APR Motorsport (drivers Ian Baas, Marc Basseng, Rene Rast and Frank Stippler).

=== R8 e-tron prototype ===
An Audi R8 e-tron entered the Silvretta E-Auto Rally Montafon 2010 with factory driver Lucas Luhr. The R8 e-tron won the race against 23 other electric cars in the three-day race. An R8 e-tron prototype (rated 381 PS (280 kW; 376 bhp) and 820 N⋅m (604.80 lb⋅ft)) driven by Markus Winkelhock completed Nürburgring at 8:09.099 minutes.

== Reviews and awards ==
Many publications were hailing it as the first car to truly be able to beat the Porsche 997—considered by many to be one of the best sports cars ever made, and a leader in its class. Initial comparison tests have proven quite positive in this respect; Evo Magazine listed it as a "supercar", compared the R8 to the Porsche 911 Carrera 4S, Aston Martin V8 Vantage, and BMW M6 and after praising the R8's "amazing stability, traction and grip, unparalleled steering accuracy and bite, (and) its uncannily flat and disturbance-free ride", claimed that as a result of "the sublime effortlessness of it all", the Audi is a better sports car. The article concluded that "Audi humbles Porsche. A new dawn starts today".

Other publications have also written similar reviews of the Audi beating the Porsche in comparison tests. In a half mile drag race conducted by Battle of the Supercars between the R8 and a 997 Carrera S, the Porsche won, crossing the line just a half metre before the R8. However, the R8 easily beat the Porsche around Top Gear's test track.

The television show Top Gear compared the Nissan GT-R to the R8 V8, and remarked that the R8 was "simultaneously less impressive and yet somehow more involving". On the R8 they wrote that "it rewards driver input", calling it "fantastic in a way that will appeal more to true car enthusiasts", but also remarked that it (the V8 model) was "much slower", and the GT-R was cheaper. On their test track, the car performed better than a Lamborghini Gallardo and an Aston Martin DB9.

- The R8 was awarded Best Handling Car and Fastest Car In The World of 2007 by Autocar magazine.
- It was awarded SportsCar of the year by German magazine Autobild.
- Playboy magazine awarded it Car of The Year for 2008.
- The Automobile Journalists Association of Canada (AJAC) named the R8 Canadian Car of the Year, and, in addition, gave it the Best New Prestige Car and Best New Design awards for model year 2008.
- Fifth Gear named the R8 both the Best fast car and the Car of the Year 2007.
- Automobile Magazine awarded the R8 the 2008 Automobile of the Year.
- The Audi R8 was named 2008 "MSN Car of the Year", with 42% of the votes, beating the Ferrari F430 into 2nd with 13%, and the BMW M3 into 3rd with 11%.
- The JB car pages awarded the Audi R8 its maximum rating of 5 stars.
- In the 2008 World Car of the Year awards, the R8 was awarded World Performance Car of the Year and World Design Car of the Year.
- European Car magazine rated the R8 as Car of the Year.
- Motor Klassik readers named the Audi R8 the "Classic Car of the Future 2009" in the Sports Car category.

== Production ==
Customers bought every unit available for 2008 within a week after the R8 premiered at the Bogota International Auto Show and Auto Expo of Medellin. In April 2013, the 100th Audi R8 GT3 race car, an Audi R8 LMS ultra, was delivered to Team MS RACING from Heilbronn-Biberach facility.

== Marketing ==
As part of the Audi R8 e-tron concept launch, a PlayStation 3 video game titled Vertical Run was produced. The goal of Vertical Run is to beat the competition in a multiplayer challenge by collecting enough electrical energy and avoiding driving errors in the e-tron, in order to reach the highest possible speed. The game was accessible through the PlayStation Home service in the new Audi Space within PlayStation Home.

After record consumer response in 2011, Audi brought back its #WantAnR8 Twitter campaign where fans can tweet for the opportunity to get behind the wheel of a 2012 Audi R8 for a day. The #WantAnR8 hashtag would appear during a new 30-second spot called "Once Upon a Time," featuring the R8 supercar. The spot debuted on March 21, 2013 on the Audi YouTube channel, followed by network TV on March 26. The new #WantAnR8 Twitter contest ran from March 20, 2012 through October 29, 2012. The contest was split up into four entry periods, and two winners being selected in each round, for eight winners in total. Winners had the option to drive the R8 on the track at the Audi Sportscar Experience in Sonoma, CA or have an R8 delivered to their home. The new 30-second spot called "Once Upon a Time" was created by Audi of America advertising agency Venables, Bell and Partners.

On December 30, 2013, an Audi R8 valued at US$157,300 was awarded as a prize on the CBS daytime American game show The Price Is Right. It was one of the biggest and expensive prizes ever won in the show's daytime history at the time of airing.

As part of the R8 facelift market launch in the UK, a new film for the R8 V10 plus had been produced. In addition, users of the free image-recognition app Blippar are able to view this video by simply pointing their phone at print and poster advertisements of the car, instantly bringing 2D photographs to life.

The R8 became the main vehicle for Tony Stark (played by Robert Downey Jr.) throughout Marvel's Iron Man Trilogy with a V8 used in Iron Man, a V10 Spyder used in Iron Man 2 and an e-tron prototype being used in Marvel's Iron Man 3. A red 2014 Audi R8 Spyder was used in the U.S. premiere of Iron Man 3 at El Capitan and TCL Chinese Theatres, being driven by Robert Downey, Jr.

A 2014 Audi R8 V10 Plus Coupé was used in the Audi Health Check program in Canada (between 2013-07-15 and 2013-09-15), where some customers turning in out-of-warranty vehicles received as a shuttle an Audi R8 outfitted as a German EMS (Emergency Medical Services) vehicle.

An Audi R8 Spyder was used in London's Leicester Square with the world premiere of The Wolverine, with Hugh Jackman. In the film, the car is driven by Wolverine (Hugh Jackman), Jean Grey (Famke Janssen), Yukio (Rila Fukushima), Shingen (Hiroyuki Sanada) and Mariko (Tao Okamoto) in an Audi R8 Spyder and the red colour 2012 Audi R8 Coupe - similar to the one which was put on display on a specially erected plinth on the red carpet. An Audi R8 e-tron was used in the end of X-Men: Days of Future Past.

As part of the 2014 Audi R8 launch in the US, Audi Library iPad App was produced, allowing the user to configure a 2014 R8 V10 plus on the fully interactive digital brochure as well as access dynamic Audi content. In conjunction with the new Audi Library app, Audi also released a new video on the S tronic transmission. The video engages and excites sportscar enthusiasts by highlighting the incredibly fast shifting seven-speed S tronic double clutch transmission on the track.

As part of the 2014 Audi R8 launch in the US, the Audi #WantAnR8 contest returned between October 23, 2013 and November 20, 2013, where fans are challenged to prove their love for the R8 by taking their own virtual turn on the Sonoma Raceway to create a video featuring original Audi R8 footage and music from innovative recording artists from around the world.
