= Audi R8 Le Mans Concept =

Audi R8 V12 TDI
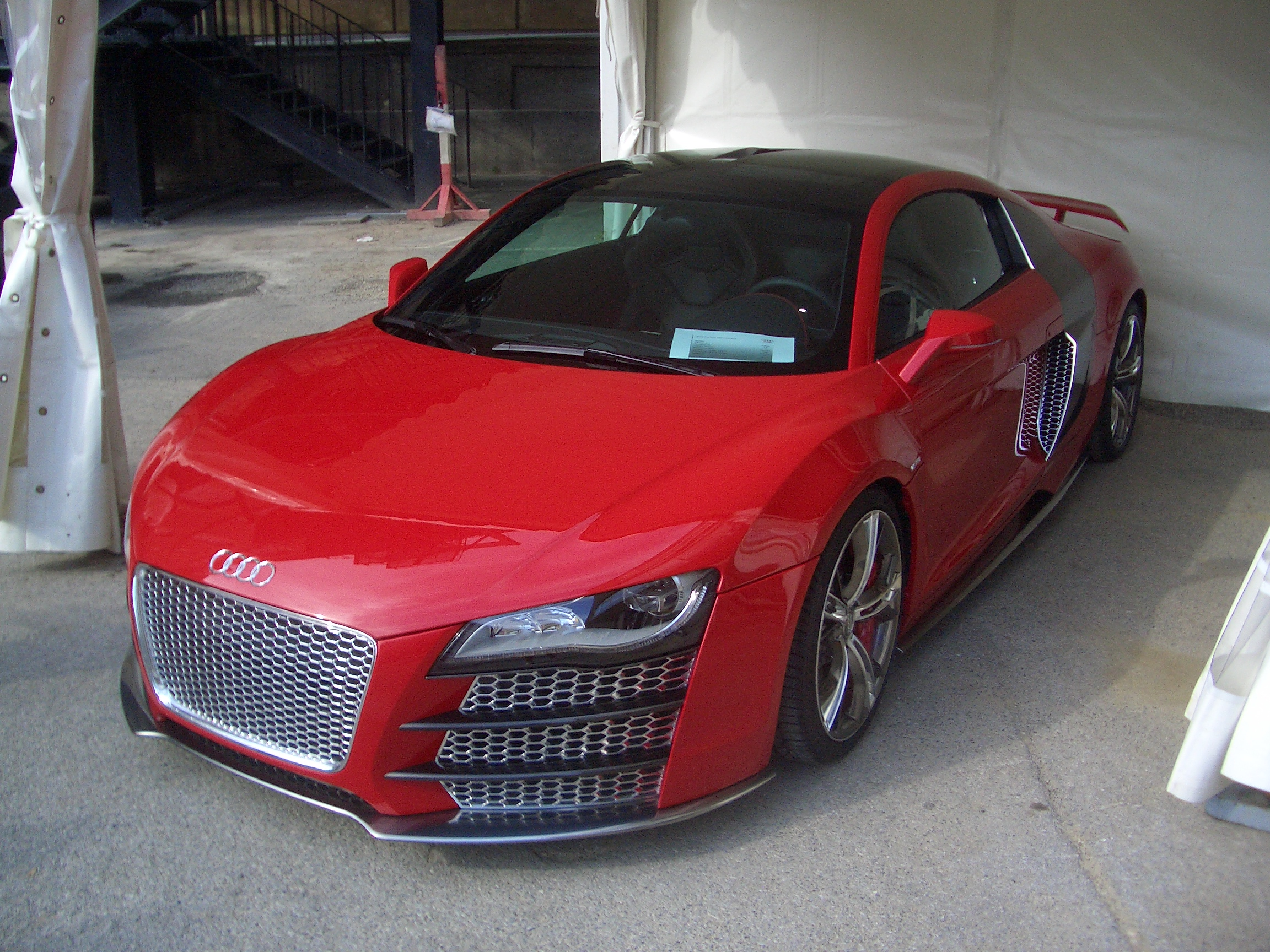

Overview
- Manufacturer: Audi AG
- Also called: Audi R8 TDI Le Mans
- Production: 2008
- Assembly: Neckarsulm, Germany

Body and chassis
- Class: Concept car
- Body style: 2-door coupé
- Layout: Mid engine, quattro permanent four-wheel drive
- Related: Audi R8; Audi Q7

Powertrain
- Engine: 5,984 cubic centimetres (365.2 cu in) V12 TDI
- Power output: 493 brake horsepower (368 kW) @4,000 rpm 1,000 newton-metres (740 lbf⋅ft) @ 1750-3000 rpm
- Transmission: 6-speed manual

Dimensions
- Wheelbase: 2,650 mm (104 in)
- Curb weight: 1,860 kg (4,100 lb)

The Audi R8 V12 TDI (later renamed the Audi R8 TDI Le Mans), was a diesel-engined concept car that was first presented to the public at the 2008 North American International Auto Show on 13 January and then the Geneva Motor Show in March in the same year. The car was fitted with a 6.0-litre V12 engine, utilising Volkswagen Group's long-established Turbocharged Direct Injection (TDI) turbodiesel technology. This engine produces 368 kW (500 PS; 493 bhp) at 4,000 rpm and 1,000 N⋅m (738 lbf⋅ft) of torque at 1,750-3,000 rpm. The car utilises Audi's quattro permanent four-wheel drive system and a 6-speed manual transmission. The car can accelerate from 0–100 km/h (0–62 mph) in 4.2 seconds, and can reach a top speed of over 300 km/h (186 mph).

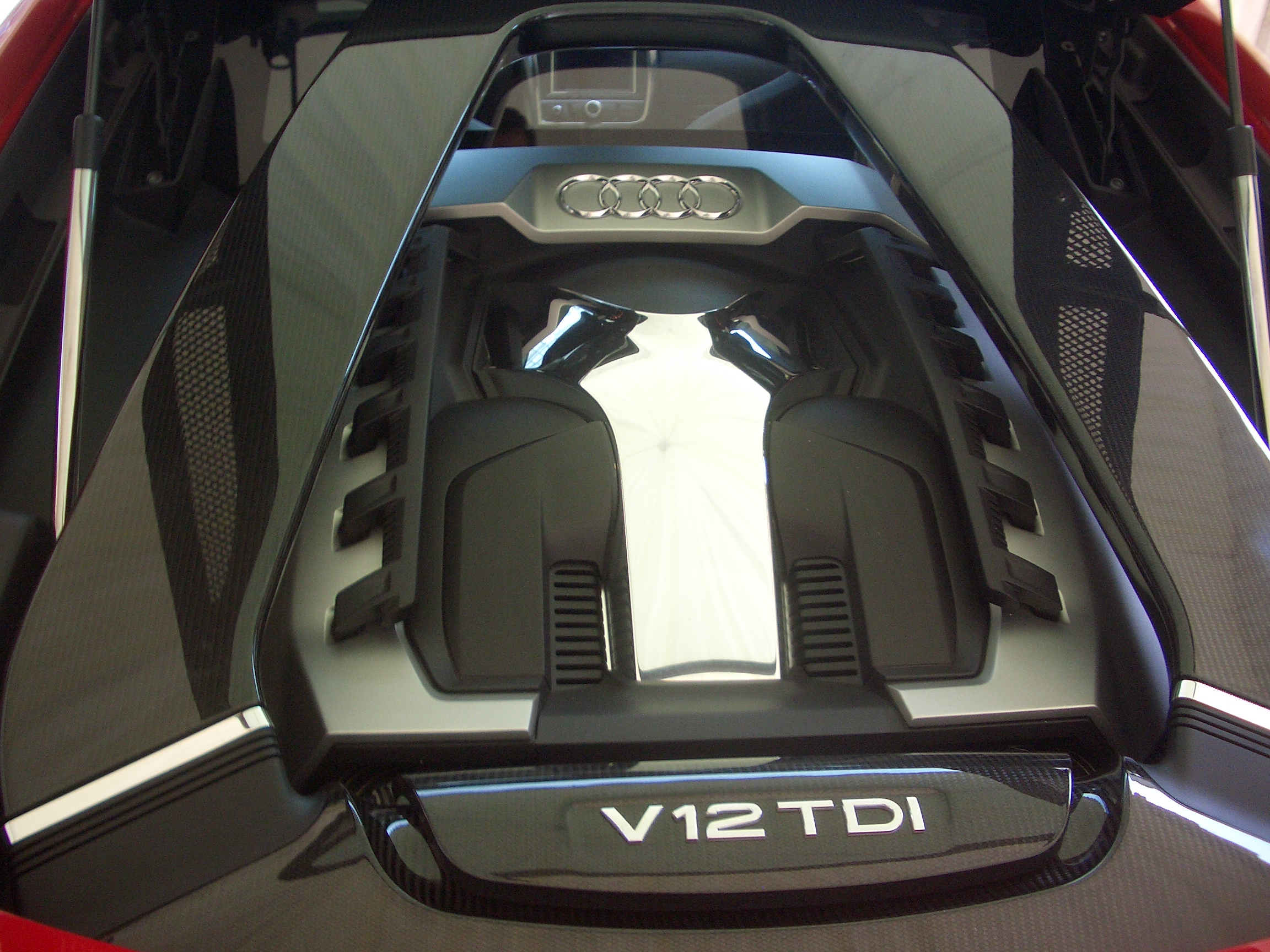
The V12 TDI engine in the Audi R8 TDI Le Mans

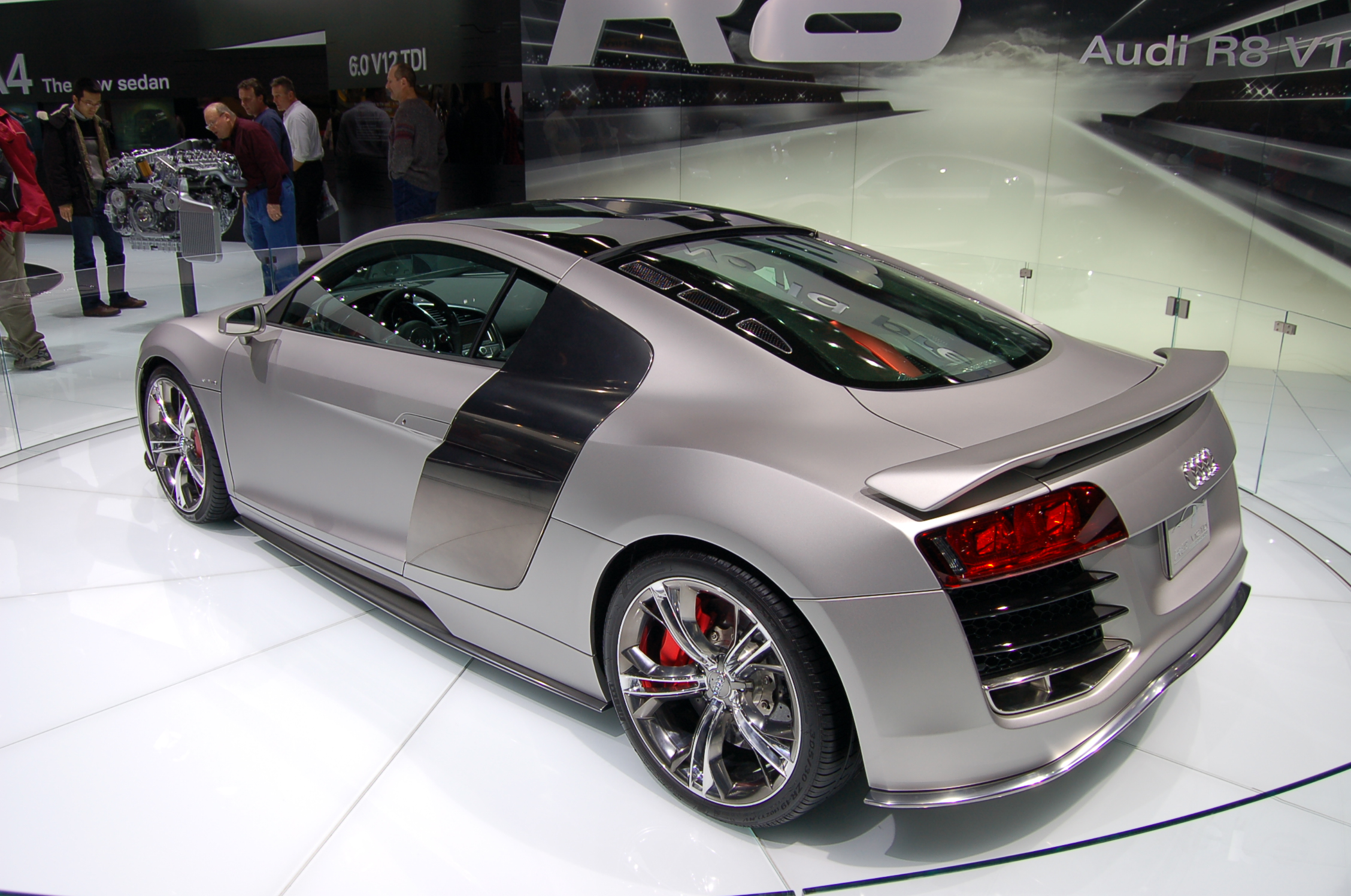
Audi R8 V12 TDI at the 2008 North American International Auto Show

The R8 TDI Le Mans has modified suspension settings and brakes to cope with the additional power and weight (300 kg (661.4 lb)), resulting from replacing the standard V8 engine with the V12 TDI. The V12 TDI requires more cooling than the standard R8, hence a NACA duct is incorporated in the roof to feed additional air into the engine. The vents on the front and back of the car have also been increased by 20% in size. The car all-LED headlamps which were first seen on the Audi Le Mans Quattro concept. For its appearance at the Detroit Motor Show, Audi fitted 20 inch alloy wheels. The rear bulkhead has been moved forward in order to accommodate the physically larger V12 engine, meaning it loses the space behind the rear seats usually found on the standard R8.

In May 2009, Audi decided to halt plans for possible production of the R8 TDI, citing "the cost of re-engineering the petrol R8 to accommodate the massive twin-turbocharged diesel engine is simply too great – and that it would be unable to recoup its investment through sales alone".
