= Romain Grosjean =

French and Swiss racing driver (born 1986)

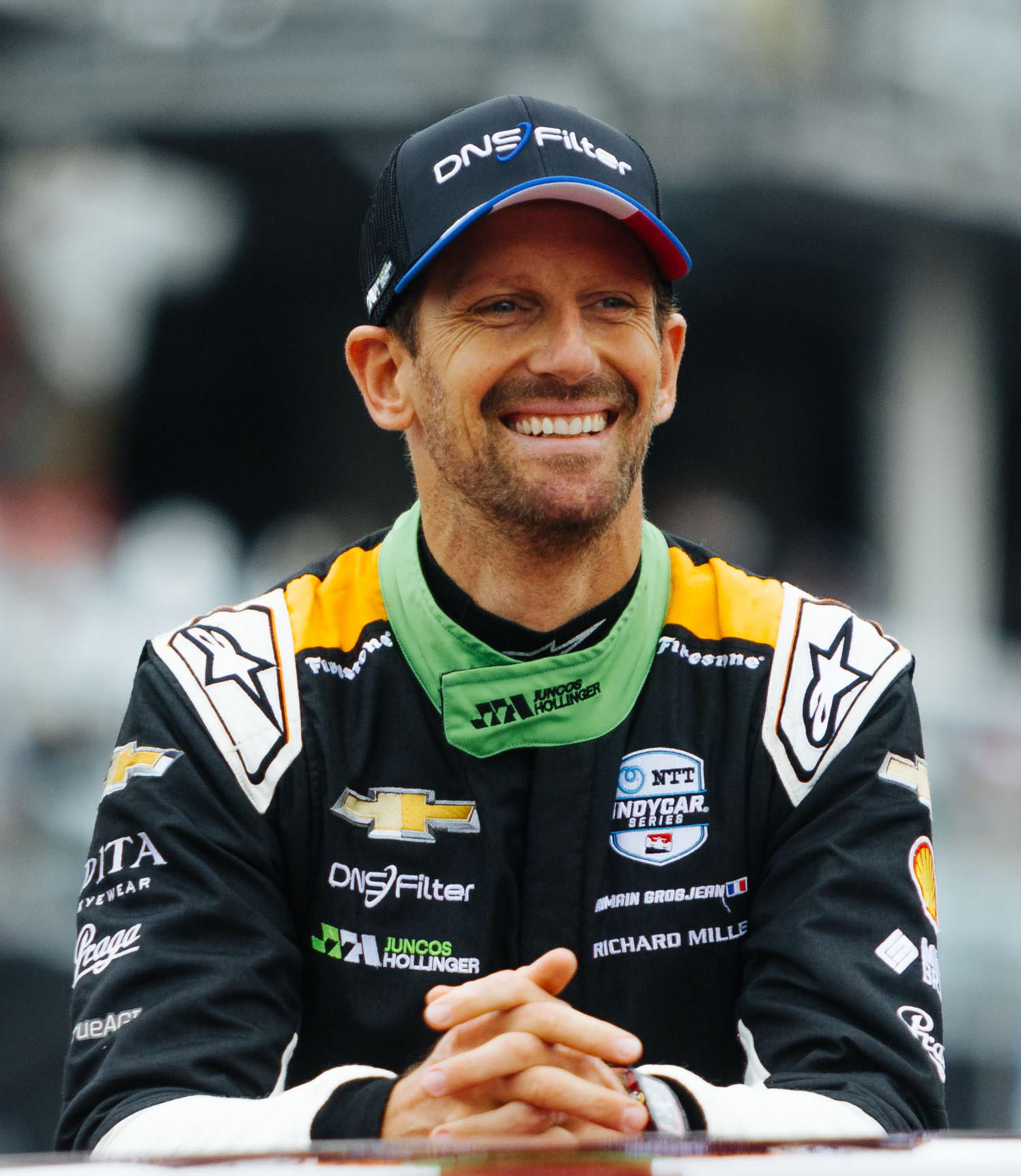
- Grosjean in 2024
- Born: Romain David Jeremie Grosjean; 17 April 1986 (age 40); Geneva, Switzerland
- Spouse: Marion Jollès (m. 2012)
- Children: 3
- Relatives: Fernand Grosjean (grandfather); Edgar Brandt (great-grandfather)

IMSA SportsCar Championship career
- Debut season: 2023
- Current team: Automobili Lamborghini Squadra Corse
- Categorisation: FIA Platinum
- Car number: 63
- Former teams: Iron Lynx
- Starts: 11
- Wins: 0
- Podiums: 0
- Poles: 0
- Fastest laps: 1
- Best finish: 14th in 2023 (GTD Pro)

IndyCar Series career
- 77 races run over 5 years
- Team: No. 18 (Dale Coyne Racing)
- Best finish: 13th (2022, 2023)
- First race: 2021 Honda Indy Grand Prix of Alabama (Birmingham)
- Last race: 2026 Mission Grand Prix of Monterey (Laguna Seca)
Wins	Podiums	Poles
0	7	3

Formula One World Championship career
- Nationality: (France) French
- Active years: 2009, 2012–2020
- Team(s): Renault, Lotus, Haas
- Car number: 8
- Entries: 181 (179 starts)
- Championships: 0
- Wins: 0
- Podiums: 10
- Career points: 391
- Pole positions: 0
- Fastest laps: 1
- First entry: 2009 European Grand Prix
- Last entry: 2020 Bahrain Grand Prix

24 Hours of Le Mans career
- Years: 2010, 2024
- Teams: Matech, Lamborghini
- Best finish: 13th (2024)
- Class wins: 0

Previous series
- 2008–2011; 2008, 2011; 2010; 2010; 2006–2007; 2004–2005; 2004–2005; 2003: GP2 Series; GP2 Asia Series; FIA GT1; Auto GP; F3 Euro Series; Formula Renault Eurocup; French Formula Renault; Formula LO

Championship titles
- 2012; 2011; 2008, 2011; 2010; 2007; 2005; 2003: Race of Champions; GP2 Series; GP2 Asia Series; Auto GP; F3 Euro Series; French Formula Renault; Formula LO

Awards
- 2021: Indycar Series Most Popular Driver

Romain David Jeremie Grosjean (French pronunciation: [ʁɔmɛ̃ ɡʁoʒɑ̃]; born 17 April 1986) is a French and Swiss racing driver, who competes in the IndyCar Series for Dale Coyne. Grosjean competed under the French flag in Formula One between 2009 and 2020, (Note: The exact years Grosjean competed in Formula One: 2009, 2012–2020.) and the IndyCar Series from 2021 to 2024 and in 2026.

Born and raised in Geneva to a Swiss father and French mother, Grosjean is the grandson of Olympic alpine skier Fernand Grosjean and the great-grandson of weapons designer Edgar Brandt. Graduating from kart racing to junior formulae in 2003 under a Swiss license, Grosjean began his career in Formula LO before moving to French Formula Renault in 2004 with SG Formula. He dominated the following season with 10 wins from 16 races. He then progressed to the Formula 3 Euro Series, winning the championship in 2007 amidst a title battle with Sébastien Buemi. Grosjean graduated to the GP2 Series in 2008, finishing fourth in his rookie season and winning the Asia Series. A member of the Renault Sport Academy since 2006, Grosjean debuted in Formula One with Renault at the 2009 European Grand Prix, replacing Nelson Piquet Jr. for the remainder of the 2009 season. He returned to junior formulae in 2010, winning the Auto GP Series, as well as becoming a race-winner in FIA GT1. He then won the GP2 title in 2011, as well as another Asia Series.

In 2012, Grosjean returned to Formula One with Lotus alongside Kimi Räikkönen. He took his maiden podium finish at the Bahrain Grand Prix, repeating this feat in Canada and Hungary. Grosjean became the first driver to receive a race ban in eighteen years after causing a multi-car collision at the Belgian Grand Prix. He achieved six further podiums in 2013 as he finished a career-best seventh in the World Drivers' Championship. Partnered by Pastor Maldonado in 2014 and 2015, he achieved his final podium at the latter Belgian Grand Prix. Grosjean moved to Haas for his 2016 campaign, ending his ten-year association with Team Enstone. He scored several points finishes in his 2017, 2018 and 2019 campaigns alongside Kevin Magnussen, finishing fourth at the 2018 Austrian Grand Prix. In 2020, Grosjean survived a crash during the opening lap of the Bahrain Grand Prix—his final race in Formula One—when his VF-20 split and caught fire after penetrating a metal crash barrier; he sustained second-degree burns and credited the halo device with saving his life.

Grosjean moved to the IndyCar Series in 2021 with Dale Coyne, achieving his maiden pole position and podium at the Grand Prix of Indianapolis. He scored several further podiums across the 2022 and 2023 seasons with Andretti. After contesting 2024 with Juncos Hollinger, Grosjean moved to sportscar racing with Lamborghini in the IMSA SportsCar Championship. In 2026, he returned to the IndyCar Series on a full-time basis for Dale Coyne Racing.

== Early life ==
Grosjean was born in Geneva, Switzerland. He was born to a Swiss father and a French mother. He is the great-grandson of Edgar Brandt, weapon designer and founder of Brandt. He is also the grandson of skier Fernand Grosjean, silver medalist in giant slalom at the 1950 World Ski Championship in Aspen.

== Junior racing career ==
Grosjean won all ten rounds of the 2003 Formula Lista Junior championship and moved to the French Formula Renault championship for 2004. He was seventh in that first season with one win and was champion in 2005 with ten victories. He also appeared in the Formula Renault Eurocup and finished on the podium twice in Valencia. With his results and potential in the Formula Renault series, Grosjean joined the Renault Driver Development programme for the continuation of his career.

=== Formula Three ===
Grosjean made his Formula Three debut at the 2005 Macau Grand Prix, standing in for Loïc Duval at Signature-Plus. He qualified nineteenth and raced to ninth, beating teammates Fábio Carbone and Guillaume Moreau.

Grosjean did a full season in the 2006 Formula 3 Euro Series but had a tough year, taking only one podium finish and ending the year thirteenth. In a one-off appearance in the British Formula Three Championship he started on pole position for both races at Pau, won both, and set the fastest lap in each.

Grosjean stayed in the Formula 3 Euro Series for 2007 but moved to the ASM team, for which Jamie Green, Lewis Hamilton, and Paul di Resta won the previous three titles. Sébastien Buemi led the championship in the early stages but Grosjean moved ahead with a victory in the ninth race of the season at Mugello. He maintained a lead in the standings from that point onwards and won the title at the final round of the year with one race in hand.

Grosjean took pole position for the prestigious Masters of Formula 3 race at Zolder but finished 14th after stalling at the start.

=== GP2 Series ===
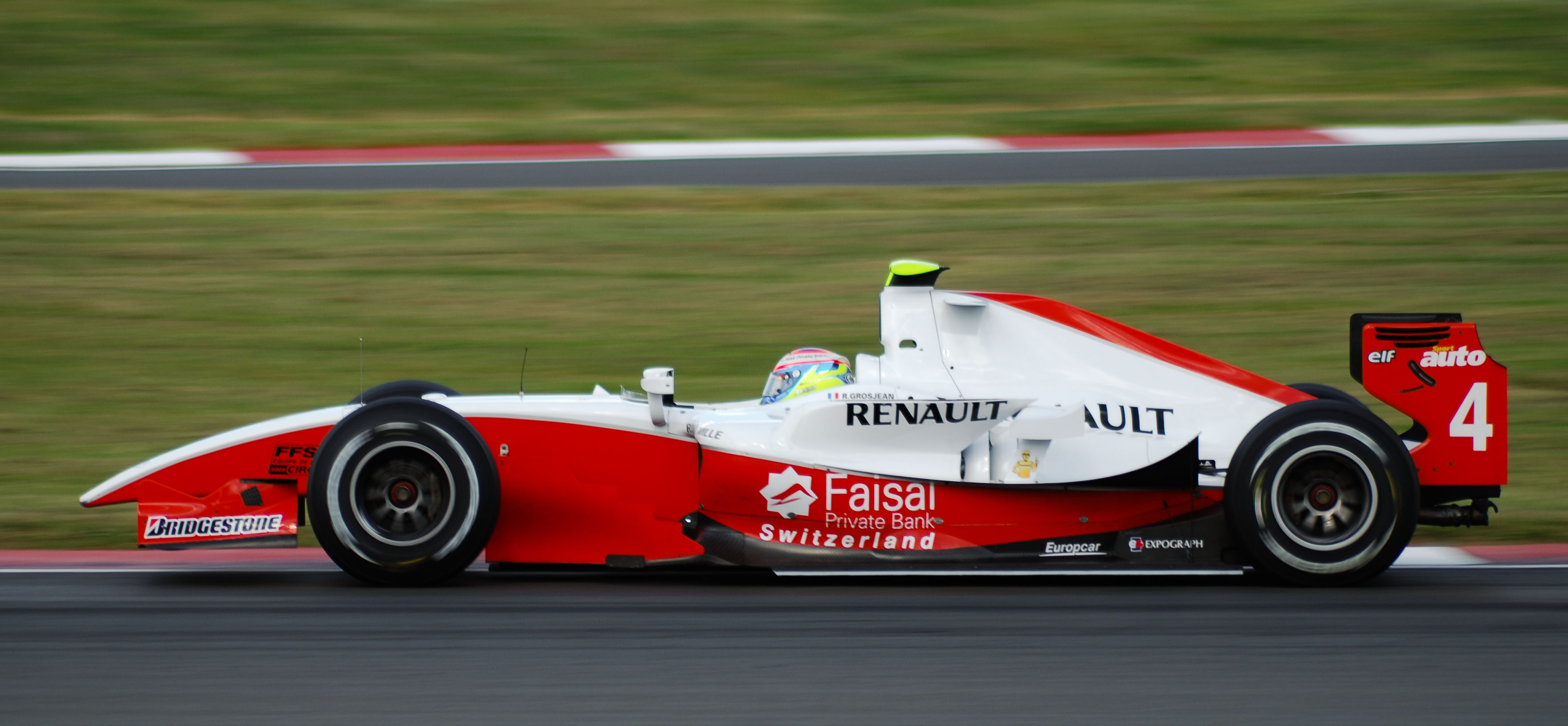
Grosjean driving for ART Grand Prix at the Silverstone round of the 2008 GP2 Series.

Grosjean drove for ART in the inaugural GP2 Asia Series season alongside Stephen Jelley, winning both races of the first round of the championship. He went on to win the championship with four race victories and sixty-one points overall.

Grosjean stayed with ART Grand Prix team for the 2008 GP2 Series. His teammates were Luca Filippi and Sakon Yamamoto.

In the first round at the Circuit de Catalunya, Grosjean started eleventh after engine problems in qualifying. He rose through the field to finish fifth in the feature race, giving him fourth on the grid for the shorter sprint race. After a good start, Grosjean was up to second and then passed Kobayashi for the lead. But Grosjean made a mistake on a late rolling restart and Kobayashi tried to pass him again for the lead. Grosjean moved across on Kobayashi to keep the position but the stewards decided his defensive move was illegal and gave him a drive-through penalty dropping him to thirteenth at the end of the race. Victory in the sprint race at Istanbul, the fourth round of the season, moved Grosjean into second place in the championship. Despite dropping back from this position, he finished the season fourth and achieved the distinction of being the highest-placed rookie in the championship.

2008 Formula 3 Euro Series champion Nico Hülkenberg joined Pastor Maldonado at ART for 2009, forcing Grosjean out of the team. Nonetheless, Renault placed him at 2008 team champions Campos Grand Prix for 2009, now known as Barwa Addax. Despite missing the last four rounds, Grosjean finished fourth in the championship standings.

== Initial stint in Formula One ==
Grosjean was confirmed as Renault's test driver for 2008, replacing Nelson Piquet Jr., who graduated to a race seat. He drove a Formula One car for the first time at the UK round of the 2008 World Series by Renault weekend at Silverstone on 7 and 8 June 2008, where he gave a number of demonstrations of the previous year's R27 car.

=== Renault (2009) ===
Grosjean initially continued in the test driver role at Renault for 2009 but took over Piquet's seat in the wake of the Crashgate controversy from the European Grand Prix onwards. Grosjean qualified fourteenth at the European Grand Prix. He was knocked out of Q2 0.323 seconds off the pace of teammate Fernando Alonso. He finished fifteenth in the race after a first-lap collision with Luca Badoer necessitated a stop for a new front wing. For the next round in Belgium, Grosjean qualified nineteenth, which he blamed on traffic and yellow flags. In the race, he was eliminated on the first lap after a collision with Jenson Button. At the Italian Grand Prix, Grosjean qualified a career-best twelfth, but made a poor start, damaged his car with contact at the first corner, spun on the second lap, and finished fifteenth. He described himself as "very disappointed" after the race.

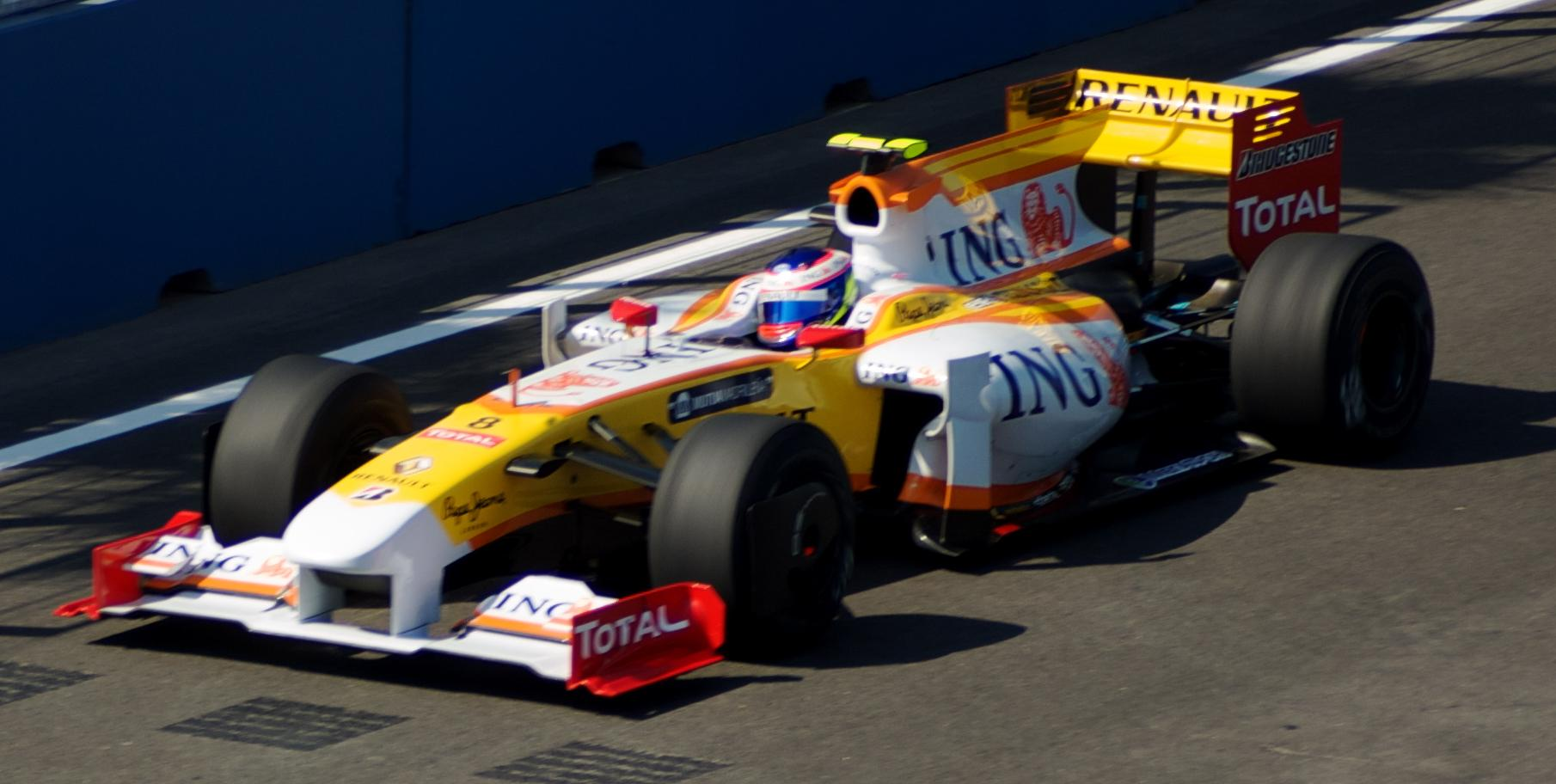
Grosjean made his Formula One debut at the 2009 European Grand Prix.

At the Singapore Grand Prix, Grosjean qualified nineteenth after suffering brake problems. He was hopeful of making progress in the race, but the brake problems reappeared, forcing him to retire after just three laps. At the Japanese Grand Prix, Grosjean qualified eighteenth, which he blamed on rain throughout practice preventing him from fully learning the demanding Suzuka Circuit, which he had never driven on before. He was promoted to seventeenth due to Timo Glock being unable to start the race. He was unable to make progress in the race, finishing sixteenth after struggling with understeer throughout the race on the unfamiliar circuit. At the Brazilian Grand Prix, Grosjean suffered an accident in practice, although he escaped unhurt. He qualified 13th in his repaired car, gained positions at the start, but then slipped back down to thirteenth after complaining of grip and tyre temperature problems, his best result of the season. At the season-ending Abu Dhabi Grand Prix, Grosjean qualified nineteenth, and finished eighteenth and last, again complaining of brake problems during the race. He said afterward that he had "learnt an enormous amount this year, especially being a teammate to Fernando".

On 31 January 2010, after the end of the season news reports had doubts that Grosjean would keep his seat into 2010, Renault confirmed that Grosjean's former GP2 teammate at the Addax Team, Vitaly Petrov would be the team's second driver alongside Robert Kubica for the 2010 season, leaving Grosjean without a Formula One drive for 2010. However, in September 2010, it was confirmed by tyre manufacturer Pirelli that Grosjean would complete a test for the company, in anticipation of their return to supplying tyres to the F1 grid in 2011. Grosjean replaced Nick Heidfeld, who left his testing duties to take up a race seat at Sauber.

== Stint outside of Formula One ==
=== Sportscars ===
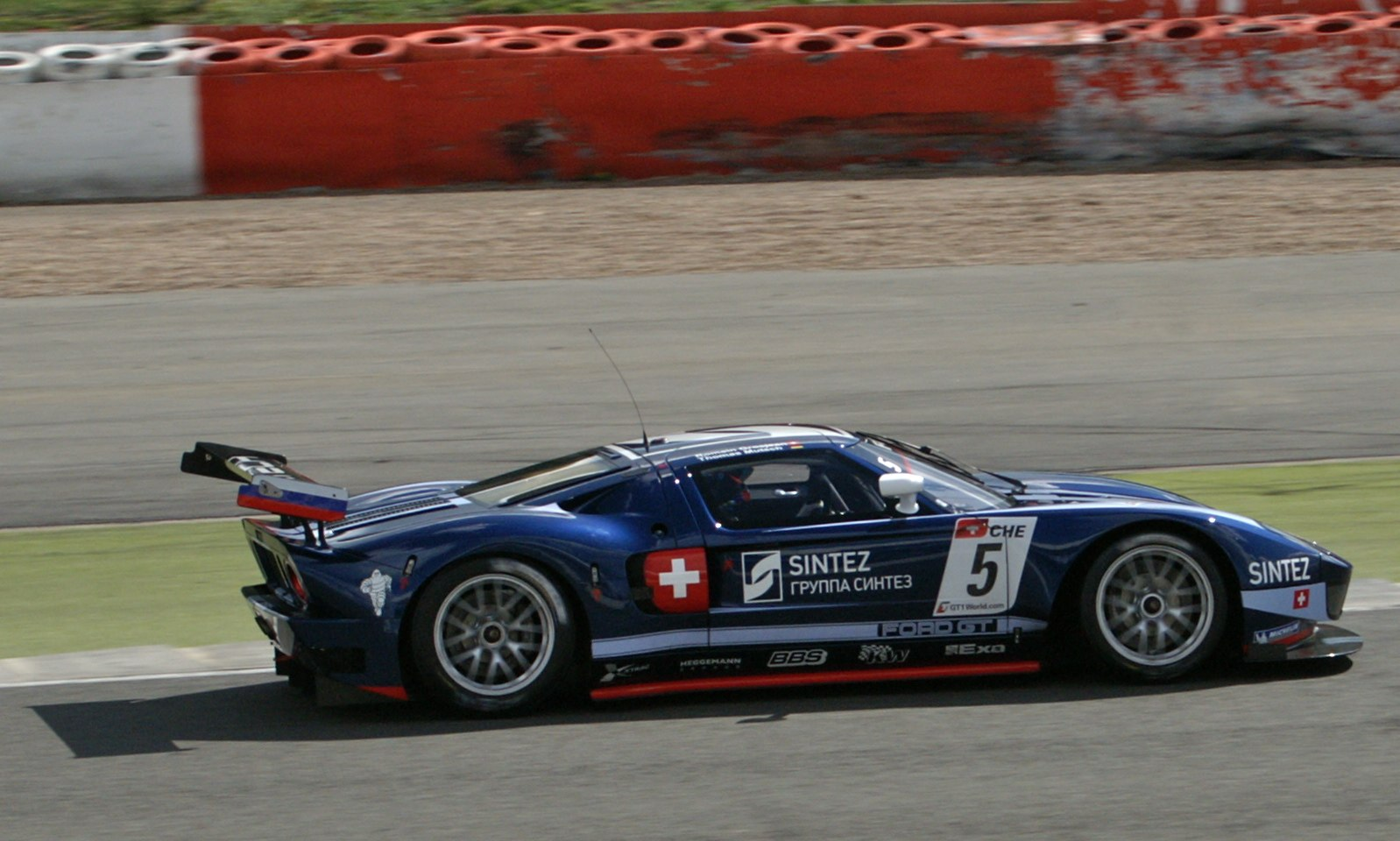
Grosjean driving a Ford GT at Silverstone

After leaving Formula One, Grosjean became involved in sportscar racing. In March 2010, Grosjean secured a drive in the inaugural FIA GT1 World Championship, driving a Ford GT1 for the Matech Competition team alongside German driver Thomas Mutsch. The pairing won the opening Championship Race of the season in Abu Dhabi and added a second victory at Brno in May to lead the standings after the first three rounds of the season.

In June 2010, Grosjean made his debut in the famous Le Mans 24 Hours endurance race, sharing a Ford GT1 with Mutsch and Jonathan Hirschi. After qualifying third in the LMGT1 class, they were forced to retire from the race after 171 laps.

=== Auto GP ===
In June 2010, Grosjean made a return to single-seaters, racing for the DAMS team in the third round of the Auto GP season at Spa-Francorchamps. After dominating practice and taking pole position, he won the feature race before finishing second to Carlos Iaconelli in the sprint event. Over the course of the weekend, Grosjean accumulated eighteen points out of a possible nineteen on offer and took away €80,000 prize money as the event's top points scorer. He went on to win three more races to take the title at Monza sixteen points ahead of runner-up Edoardo Piscopo.

=== Return to GP2 ===
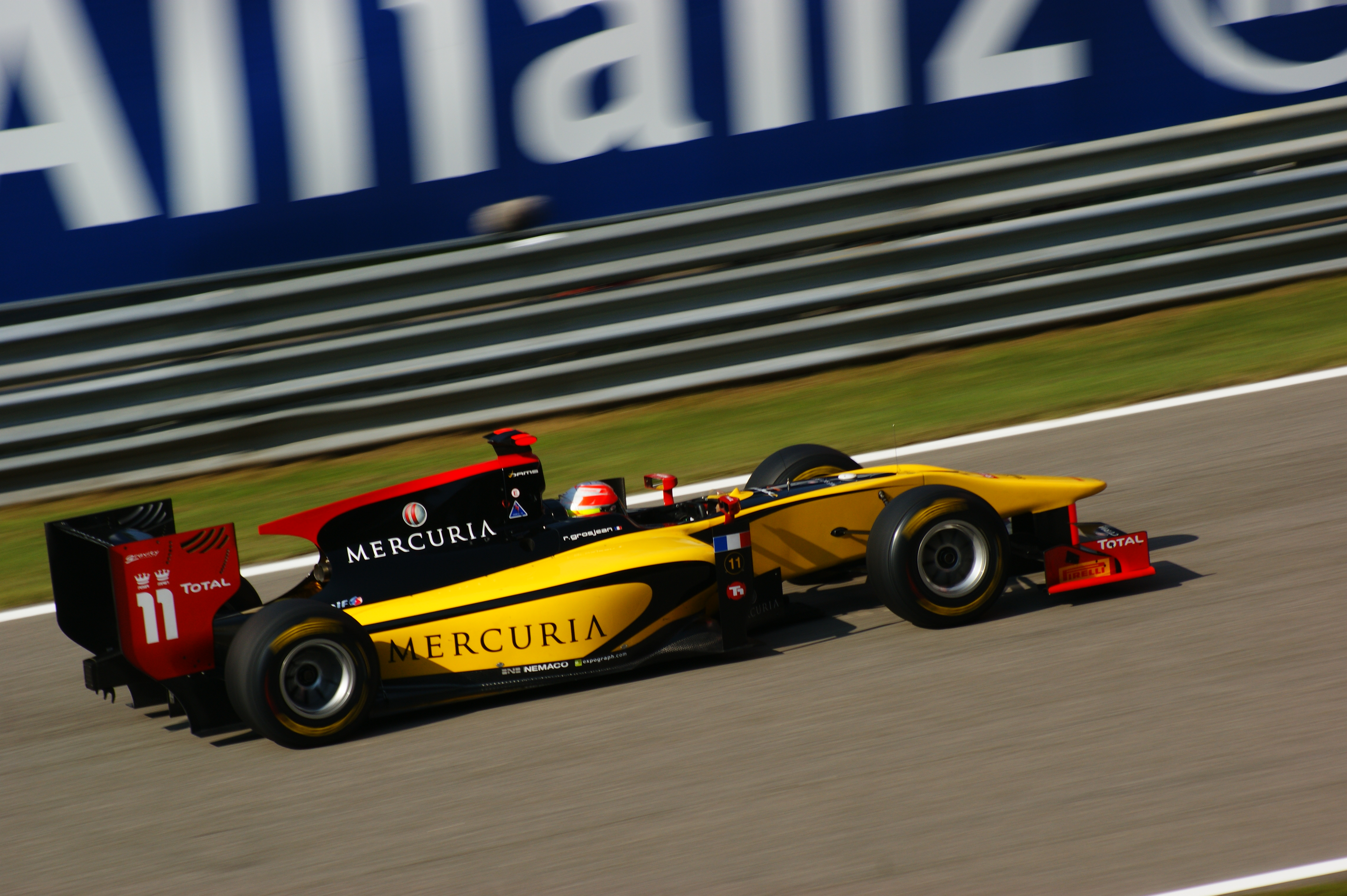
Grosjean won the 2011 GP2 Asia Series and GP2 Series championships on his full-time return to the category.

On 20 July 2010, Grosjean announced that he would return to GP2 with the DAMS team. He replaced the then Renault test driver Jérôme d'Ambrosio for the German round of the championship. He later substituted for D'Ambrosio's injured teammate, Ho-Pin Tung, from the Belgian round onwards (despite Tung recovering and returning to the series with a different team), finishing third in Belgium and Abu Dhabi to take fourteenth place in the drivers' standings, only two positions behind D'Ambrosio.

Grosjean returned to GP2 full-time with DAMS for the 2011 GP2 Series and GP2 Asia Series seasons. He took two pole positions and one race victory to win the Asia Series by six points from Jules Bianchi, and also won the first race of the main series to lead that championship as well. He lost the championship lead to Giedo van der Garde, after the second round of the series, after an event which was hampered by disqualification due to a technical infringement, but regained it again the following week at Monaco, scoring points in both races despite starting from last place on the grid. After scoring four further wins as part of a mid-season run that included six consecutive podium finishes, he pulled clear of his pursuers and clinched the championship at the penultimate round at Spa-Francorchamps.

== Return to Formula One ==
=== Lotus (2012–2015) ===
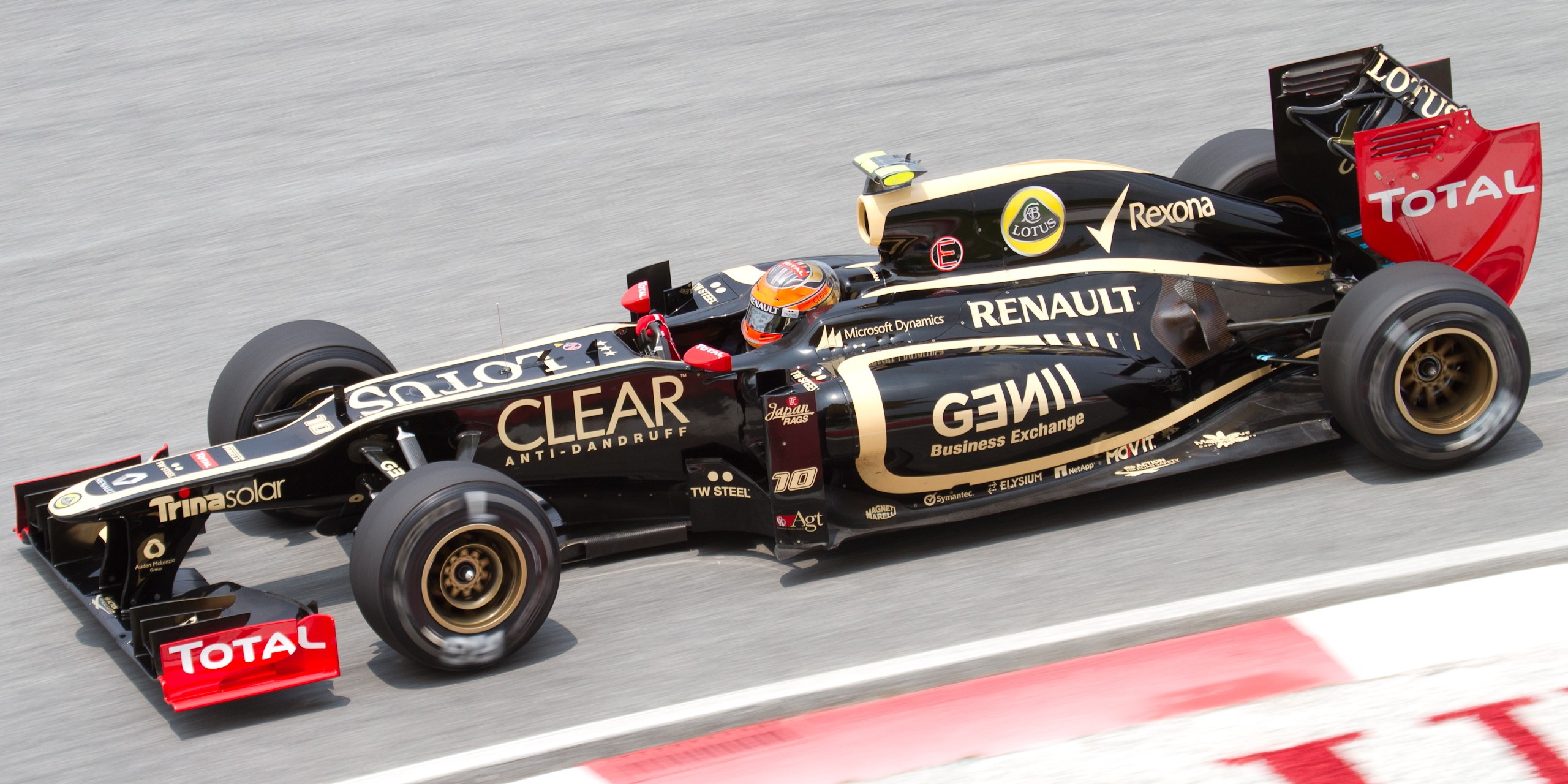
Grosjean driving for Lotus at the 2012 Malaysian Grand Prix.

At the start of 2011, Grosjean returned to the newly branded Lotus Renault GP team as one of five test drivers along with Bruno Senna, Ho-Pin Tung, Jan Charouz and Fairuz Fauzy. Lotus Renault had planned to run Robert Kubica and Vitaly Petrov throughout 2011 but Kubica had a horrific rally accident and was unable to drive during 2011. Former BMW Sauber teammate Nick Heidfeld replaced Kubica for the first eleven races before himself being replaced by Senna from the Belgian Grand Prix onwards. In late October 2011, Lotus Renault announced that Grosjean would drive in the first Friday free practice session in the Abu Dhabi Grand Prix (replacing Senna) and the Brazilian Grand Prix (replacing Petrov).

On 9 December 2011, it was announced that Grosjean would make his comeback to Formula One in 2012, taking the second seat at the newly renamed Lotus F1 Team (formerly Renault, the team that Grosjean raced with in 2009) alongside 2007 World Champion Kimi Räikkönen.

==== 2012 ====
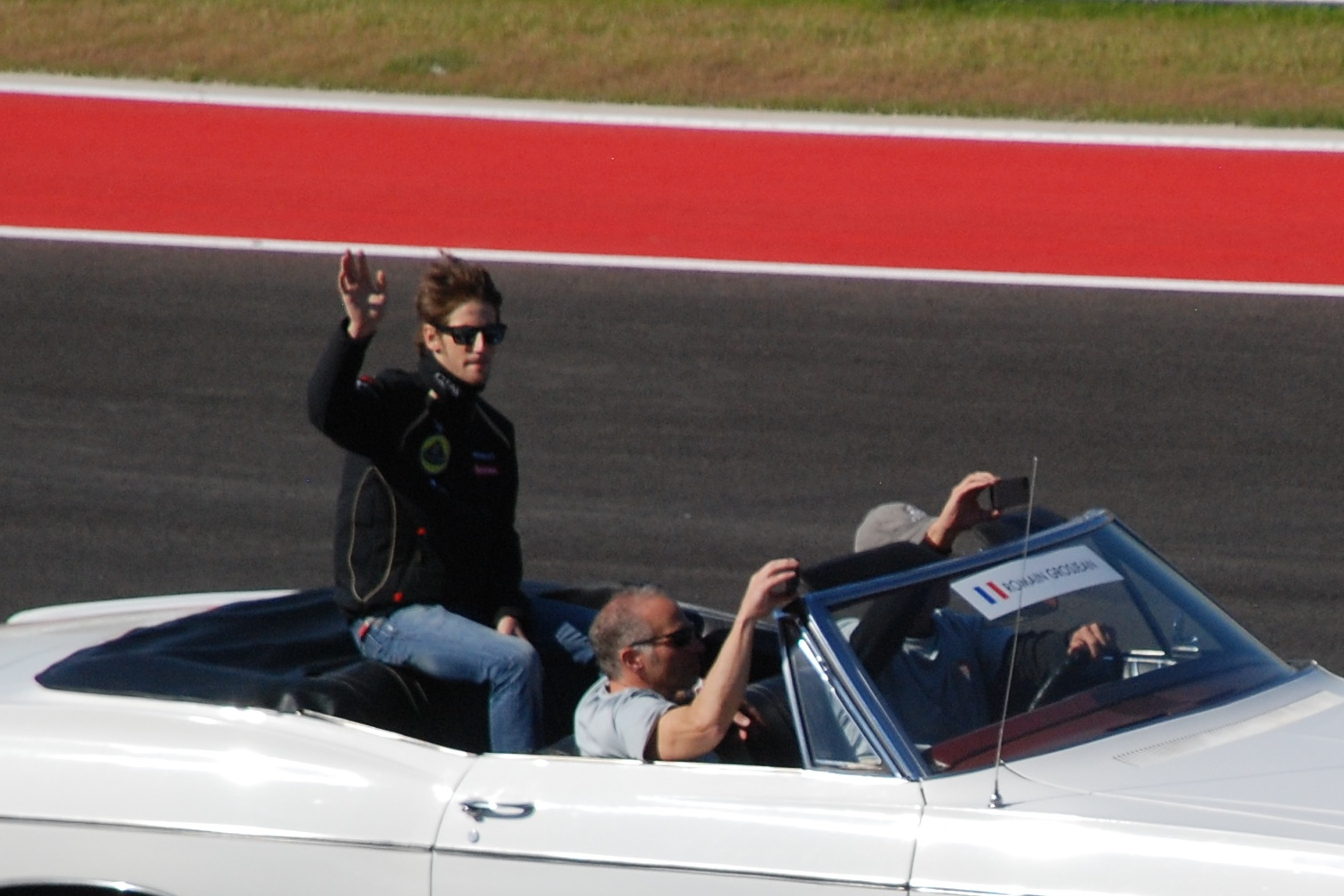
Grosjean at the 2012 United States Grand Prix.

At the Australian Grand Prix, Grosjean set the second fastest time in the final free practice session, and while teammate Räikkönen was eliminated in the first part of qualifying, Grosjean made it into the top ten – for the first time, as his previous best was twelfth place – and ultimately qualified in third position. He fell to sixth at the start and retired on the second lap after a collision with Pastor Maldonado, which broke his right-front suspension. At the 2012 Bahrain Grand Prix he finished third, collecting his first Formula One podium and the first for a French driver since Jean Alesi at the 1998 Belgian Grand Prix. In Spain Grosjean started third, finished fourth and set his first fastest lap in Formula One; the first for a French driver since Alesi at the 1996 Monaco Grand Prix. At the 2012 Canadian Grand Prix, he collected his second Formula One podium with a career best finish of second, behind Lewis Hamilton.

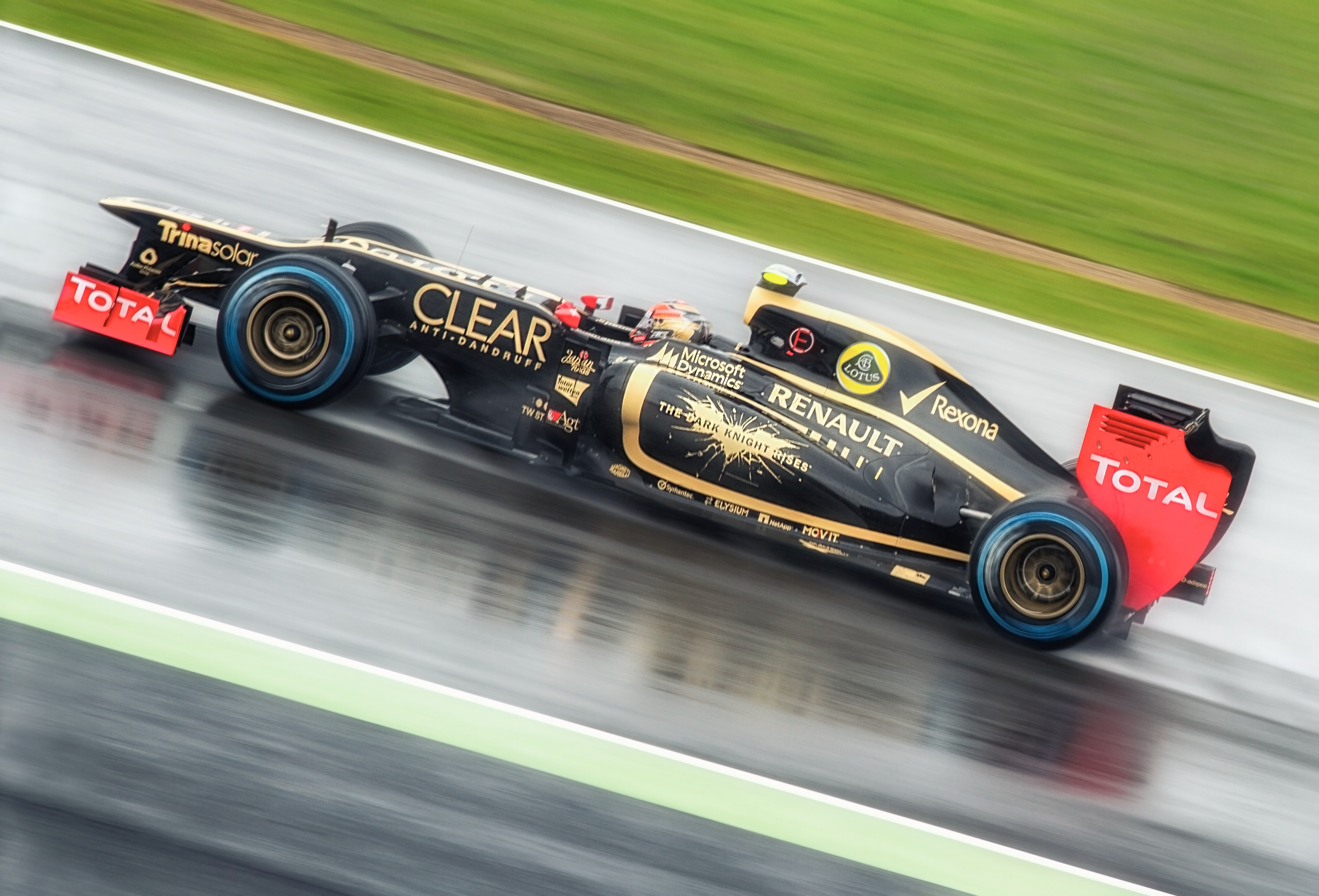
Grosjean at the 2012 British Grand Prix

At Valencia, Grosjean was running second when the car's electronics malfunctioned forcing Grosjean's first mechanical-related retirement of the season. At the British Grand Prix, Grosjean topped the timesheets during the first free practice session, but qualifying did not go as well; at the end of Q2, he spun into the gravel at the final corner after managing to get into Q3, this meant he could not take any further part in qualifying and started from tenth, although he was promoted to ninth after Nico Hülkenberg received a grid penalty. At the start of the race, he was involved in an incident with Paul di Resta, which forced a pit stop for a new front wing. However, Grosjean fought back through the field to finish in sixth just behind his teammate. At the German Grand Prix, Grosjean started nineteenth due to a gearbox penalty and finished eighteenth after picking up a puncture on lap one. A week later, at the Hungarian Grand Prix, Grosjean qualified second, the first time a French Formula One driver had started on the front row of the grid since Alesi at the 1999 French Grand Prix; Grosjean finished third in the race behind Hamilton and teammate Räikkönen.

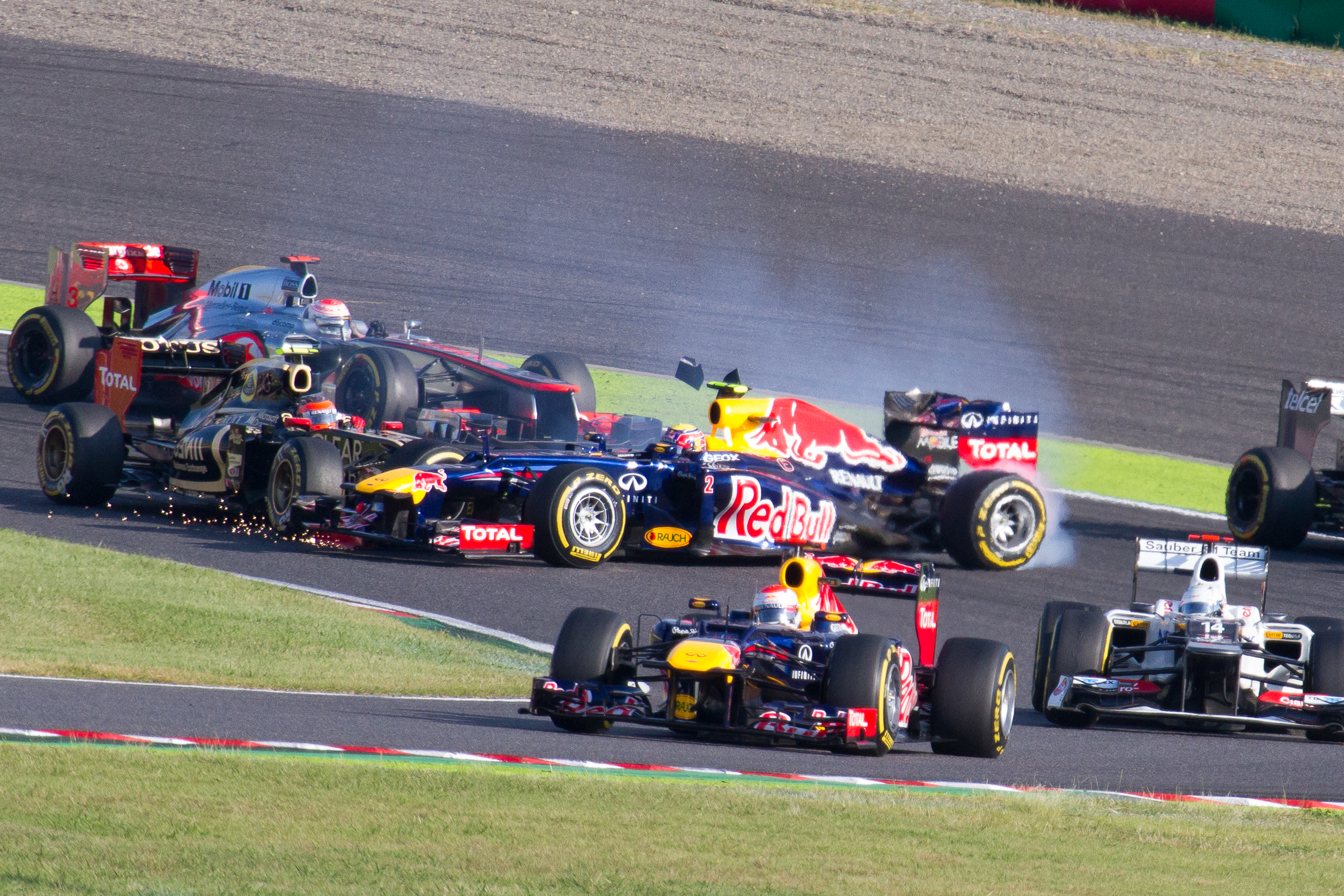
Grosjean was involved in several first-lap accidents in his first full season of Formula One, including this collision with Mark Webber at the first corner of the 2012 Japanese Grand Prix.

At Spa, Grosjean caused a multi-car pile-up at the start of the race, with Hamilton, Fernando Alonso and Sergio Pérez all eliminated from the race as well as Grosjean; the incident was started when Grosjean drove into Hamilton on the approach to the La Source corner. Grosjean was given a one race ban post-race (the first driver to be banned since Michael Schumacher in 1994), as well as a fine of €50,000, with the FIA saying in a statement "The stewards regard this incident as an extremely serious breach of the regulations, which had the potential to cause injury to others. It eliminated leading championship contenders from the race. The stewards note [that] the team conceded the action was an extremely serious mistake and an error of judgement. Neither the team nor the driver made any submission in mitigation of penalty." He was replaced for the 2012 Italian Grand Prix by Lotus test and reserve driver Jérôme d'Ambrosio. His team boss, Éric Boullier said that Grosjean learned an important lesson following his ban, however at the Japanese Grand Prix, Grosjean crashed into Mark Webber at the first corner with Webber branding him a "first lap nutcase". Grosjean's actions were condemned by many drivers in the paddock. At the Abu Dhabi Grand Prix, Grosjean was involved in another first lap incident. In São Paulo Grosjean hit the back of Pedro de la Rosa's HRT in qualifying.

On 14–16 December Grosjean won the Race of Champions after a Grand Final victory over Le Mans legend Tom Kristensen at the Rajamangala Stadium in Bangkok. The day before Grosjean finished in second place in the Nations' Cup event along with his teammate Sébastien Ogier in the French team, after defeat by Germany's Sebastian Vettel and Michael Schumacher.

On 17 December 2012, it was confirmed that Grosjean would stay at Lotus for the 2013 season.

==== 2013 ====
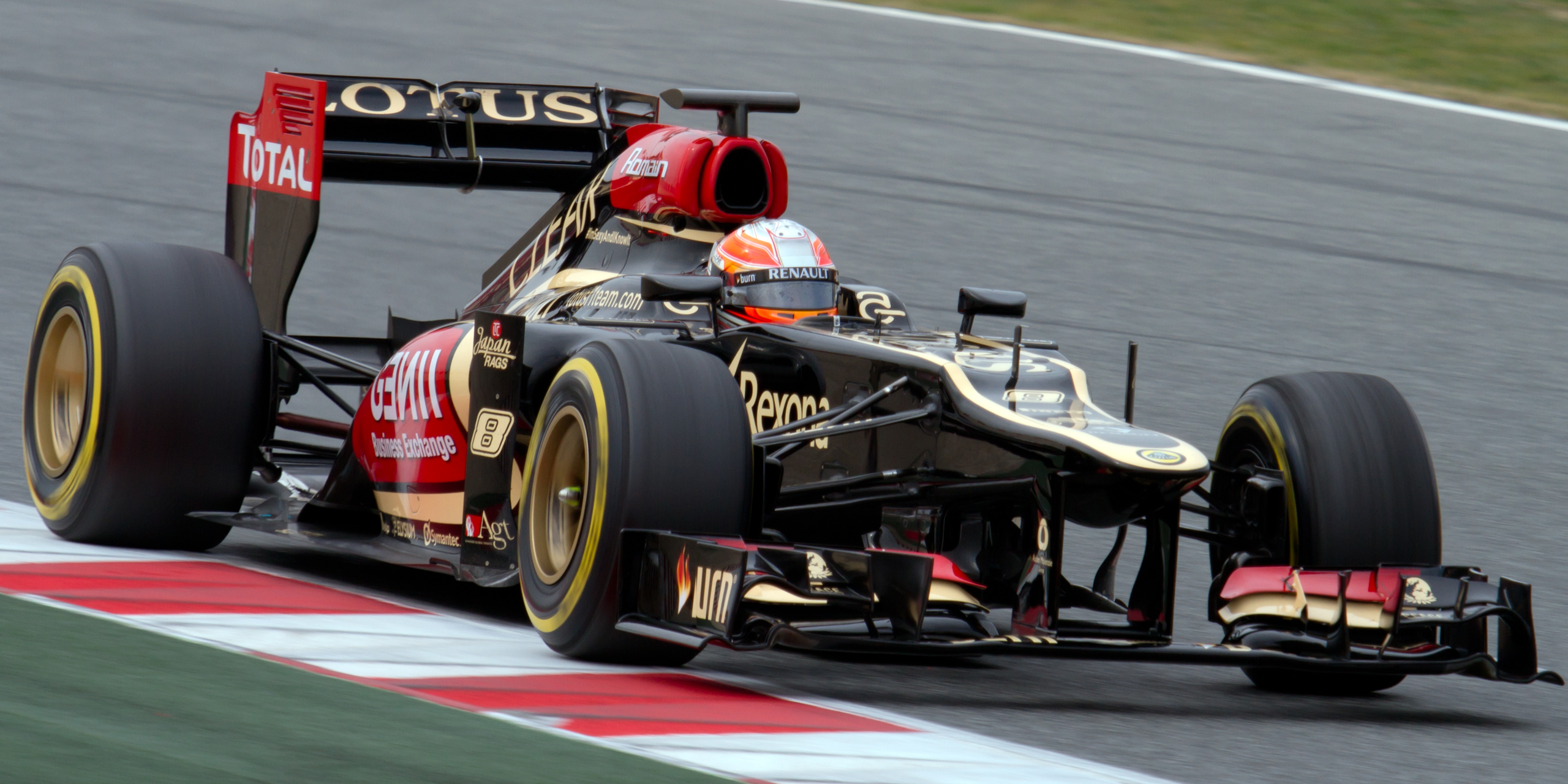
Grosjean testing the Lotus E21 in Barcelona.

Grosjean had three points-scoring finishes at the three opening races before receiving a new chassis to help his chances at Bahrain; he qualified eleventh and climbed to third. At the next race in Spain, his suspension failed on lap nine. At the Monaco Grand Prix, Grosjean had three crashes during the practice sessions, leading his team principal, Boullier, to tell Grosjean to "wake up". He qualified thirteenth but his race ended when he crashed into the back of Daniel Ricciardo, earning him a ten-place grid penalty for the next race. At the Canadian Grand Prix, he started last on the grid due to the grid penalty but ran as high as eighth in the race before finishing thirteenth as he had to stop for a third time due to heavy tyre wear. On the first lap of the British Grand Prix, Grosjean made contact with Mark Webber, damaging the front wing of Webber's car. Grosjean retired on the last lap while in eighth position due to serious front wing damage. At the German Grand Prix after qualifying fifth, he led the race for a while and seemed to be on a faster pace than Sebastian Vettel but the intervention of the safety car changed the race. He was forced to let his teammate Kimi Räikkönen pass towards the end of the race as Räikkönen had faster tyres. Grosjean resisted Fernando Alonso to earn his second podium of the season behind Vettel and Räikkönen.

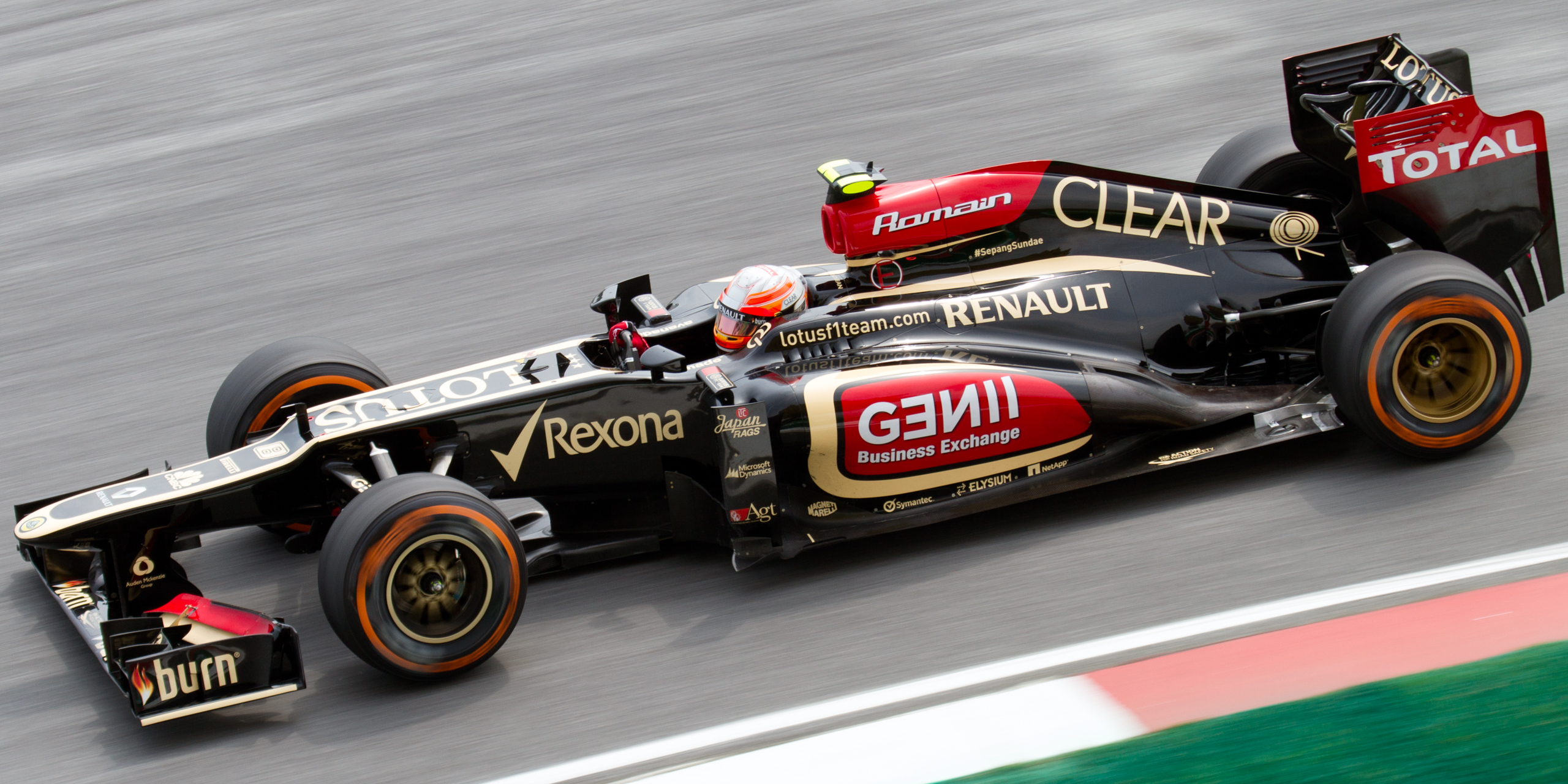
Grosjean at the 2013 Malaysian Grand Prix.

At the Hungarian Grand Prix, Grosjean qualified third on the grid but finished the race in sixth position after receiving a drive-through penalty for crossing the white line as he overtook Felipe Massa. After the race, he was given a further twenty-second time penalty for colliding with Jenson Button, however, this did not affect his final position. At the Belgian Grand Prix, Grosjean qualified seventh on the grid, and Lotus chose to operate a one-stop strategy on Grosjean's car. Later in the race, he was sent off track by Sergio Pérez while Pérez was attempting an overtake – Pérez received a drive-through penalty for the incident. Grosjean finished the race in eighth position after being overtaken by Massa towards the end of the race. At the Italian Grand Prix, Grosjean qualified thirteenth as both Lotuses showed a slow pace in practice. After a slow pit stop, he came back to finish in eighth after many overtaking moves and resisting Lewis Hamilton on the last lap. In Singapore Grosjean had a difficult weekend full of mechanical problems; and despite qualifying third, he was forced to retire due to an engine issue. At the Korean Grand Prix, he qualified fourth and was moved up to third on the grid after a grid penalty for Webber. He made a good start in which he overtook Hamilton and was closing on Vettel until the safety car came out. This intervention aided Räikkönen's progression up the order, and after a small mistake, Grosjean was overtaken by his teammate. Grosjean maintained position behind Räikkönen and secured his third podium of the season, in third.

The next weekend, at Suzuka, Grosjean qualified fourth. After a poor start by the Red Bulls on the front row, Grosjean took the lead into the first corner and showed a good pace compared to the Red Bulls behind him, leading almost half the race. Vettel passed him on lap 28 and he was also later overtaken by Mark Webber, and finished third for the second straight race. In India, Grosjean failed to reach Q2 on medium tyres to save softer tyres, and he ultimately qualified seventeenth. In the race, he had a longer first stint with soft tyres to apply a one pit stop strategy that worked perfectly as he finished third behind Vettel and Rosberg after overtaking Massa and then Räikkönen who forced him off the track on his first overtaking attempt. At Abu Dhabi, after qualifying seventh (and being promoted to sixth due to teammate Räikkönen's penalty), he had another strong start and strong race, finishing fourth. At the United States Grand Prix, Grosjean had a good qualifying session and earned the third spot on the grid behind Vettel and Webber. In the race, Grosjean had a strong start once again, by overtaking Webber and nearly overtaking Vettel. Leading a lap during the pit stop phase, Grosjean finished second by holding off Webber despite numerous overtaking attempts.

On 29 November 2013, it was confirmed that Grosjean would continue with Lotus in 2014.

==== 2014 ====
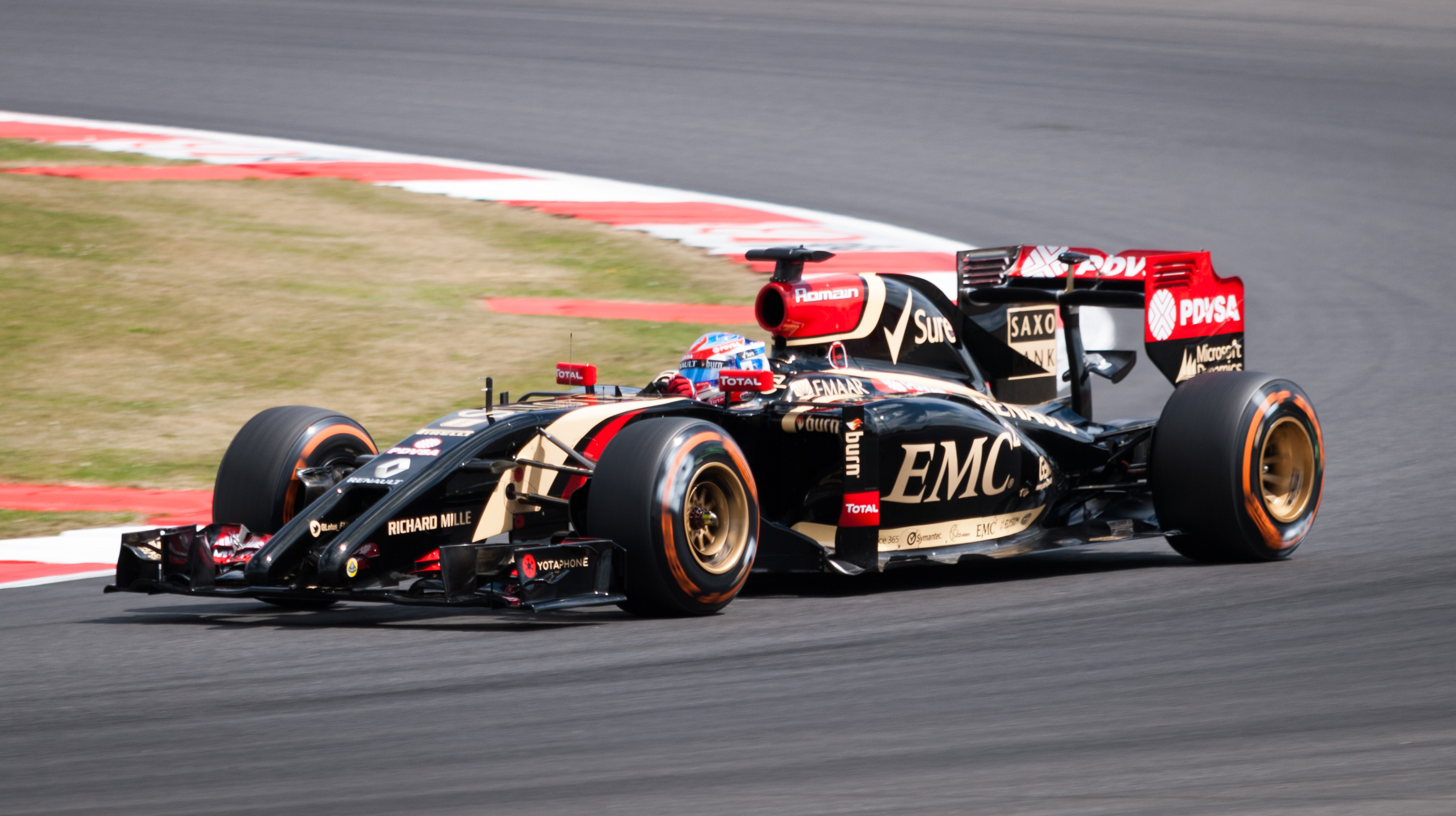
Grosjean at the 2014 British Grand Prix

A new rule for the 2014 season allowed the drivers to pick a car number to use for their entire career. Grosjean was awarded his first choice of number 8. He explained his choice of number on his Facebook page: "Simply I like this number, plus it has some signification to me. My wife was born on 8 December, we started dating in 2008 and besides, to my eyes my son is the 8th wonder of the world. That's why I picked up number 8." Among all the races in 2014, he was only able to score on two occasions and claim eight points.

==== 2015 ====
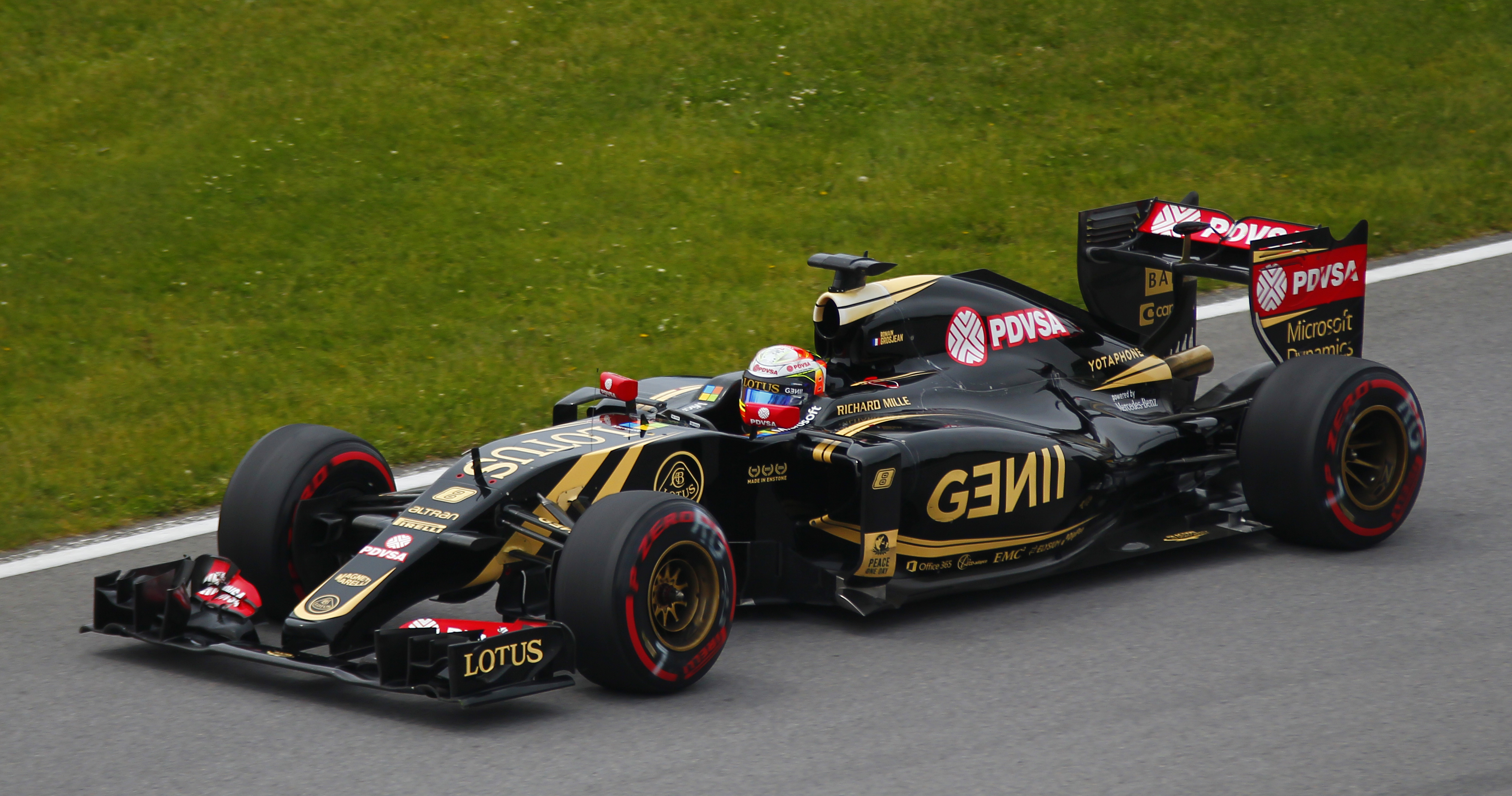
Grosjean at the 2015 Canadian Grand Prix

In 2015, Lotus produced a much better car, which was powered by a Mercedes engine. Grosjean showed great potential in testing, but mechanical problems in Australia and a spin after contact with Sergio Pérez in Malaysia prevented Grosjean from scoring points. But after the first two troubled races, Grosjean recorded good performances in China and Bahrain, finishing seventh on both occasions. In Spain, Lotus struggled in practice and qualifying and Grosjean missed out on Q3 for the first time in the season. But in the race, his pace improved and he finished eighth, despite making contact with Pastor Maldonado in the opening laps and a mistake in the pits, both of which cost him some time. In Monaco, Grosjean was on for his fourth consecutive points finish, despite a grid penalty for a gearbox change, but he was hit by Max Verstappen while battling for position. Grosjean managed to rejoin, but lost time and finished twelfth.

In Canada, Lotus had one of the fastest cars and Grosjean qualified in an impressive fifth place. In the race, he was in the top-five but made contact with the Marussia of Will Stevens, which punctured his tyre. Grosjean had to pit for new tyres, but managed to recover and finished in the points. In Austria, he was racing in the top-ten, but he had a mechanical issue and could not finish the race. In Great Britain, he retired on lap one after contact with Daniel Ricciardo and teammate Maldonado. In Hungary, he struggled again and even had a penalty for an unsafe release in the pits. But near the end of the race, he advance many positions due to other drivers' problems. In the end, he managed to repeat his best finish of the season of 7th, finishing ahead of Nico Rosberg's Mercedes. In Belgium, Lotus again had one of the fastest cars and Grosjean qualified in fourth, but started ninth, because of a penalty. In the race, he consistently gained positions, and a few laps before the finish, Grosjean was running fourth. Ahead of him was Vettel, who was on old tyres, and Grosjean caught up with him with five laps to go. He was not able to overtake, but Vettel's right rear tyre exploded on the penultimate lap. Grosjean moved into the podium positions, to record his first such result since 2013. After the race, Grosjean said that he cried on the last lap.

In Italy, Grosjean once again made it into Q3, qualifying in eighth, but was involved in some contact in turn one, provoking his retirement. In Singapore, he was forced to retire a few laps before the end because of a suspected gearbox issue. In Japan, Grosjean was in sixth place after the start but lost a position during the first stops to Nico Hülkenberg. Near the end of the race, he was under pressure from Maldonado, who had closed the gap to just over a second, but Grosjean managed to retain his seventh position to the finish and scored points for the first time since Belgium.

=== Haas (2016–2020) ===
==== 2016 ====
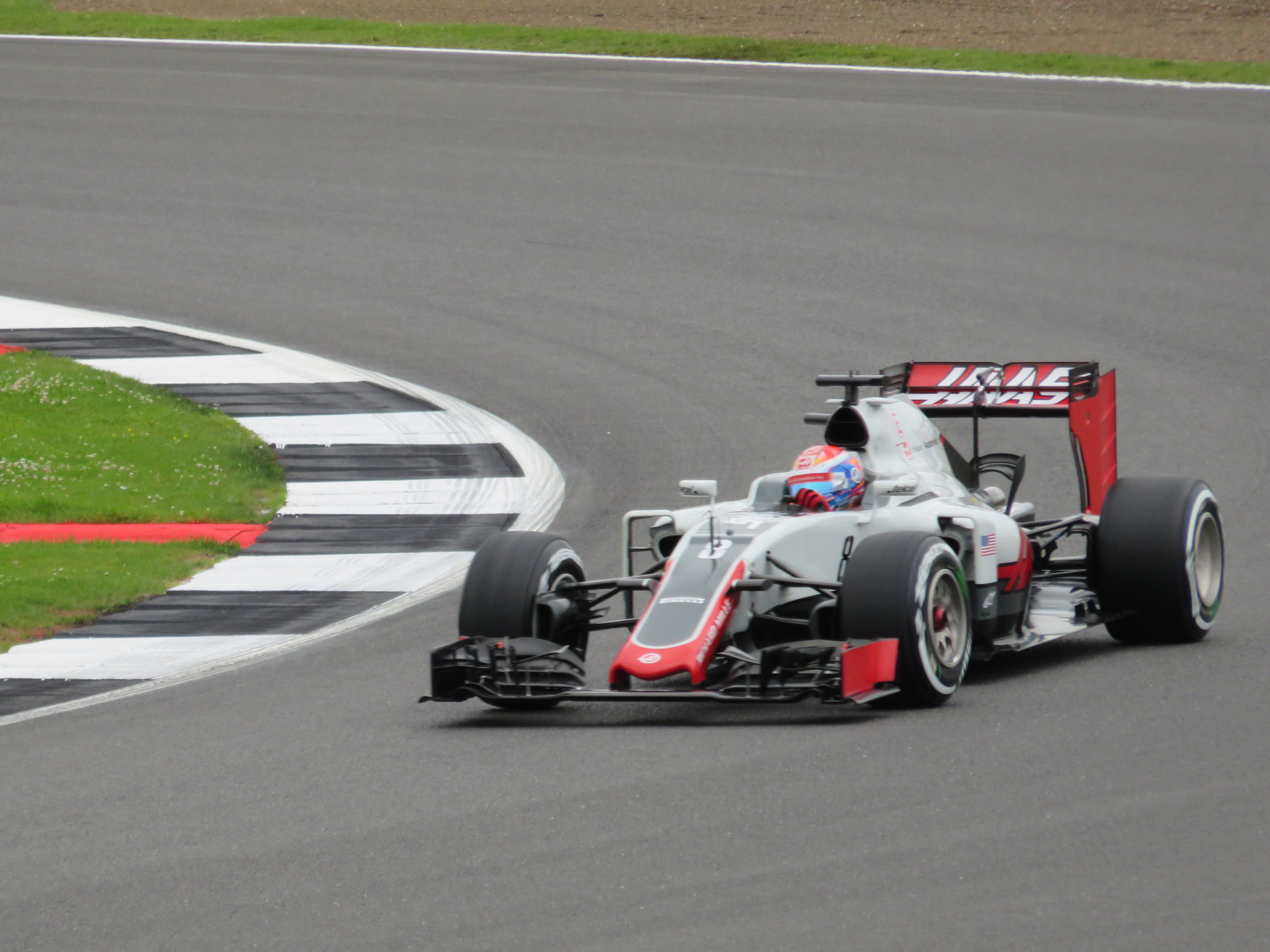
Grosjean at the 2016 British Grand Prix.

On 29 September 2015, it was announced that Grosjean would race for the Haas F1 Team, who were joining the Formula One grid for the 2016 season. He was partnered by former Sauber driver and Ferrari test driver Esteban Gutiérrez. In the team's first race, the Australian Grand Prix, Grosjean finished sixth to record Haas' first points and making them the first team since Toyota Racing to score points in their debut. He was eventually voted Formula One's first Driver of the Day. Grosjean scored again in the following Bahrain Grand Prix by finishing in fifth position, winning Driver of the Day again.

Following Jenson Button's retirement from full-time racing, the members of the GPDA elected Grosjean to replace Button as one of the directors of the GPDA in May 2017.

==== 2017 ====
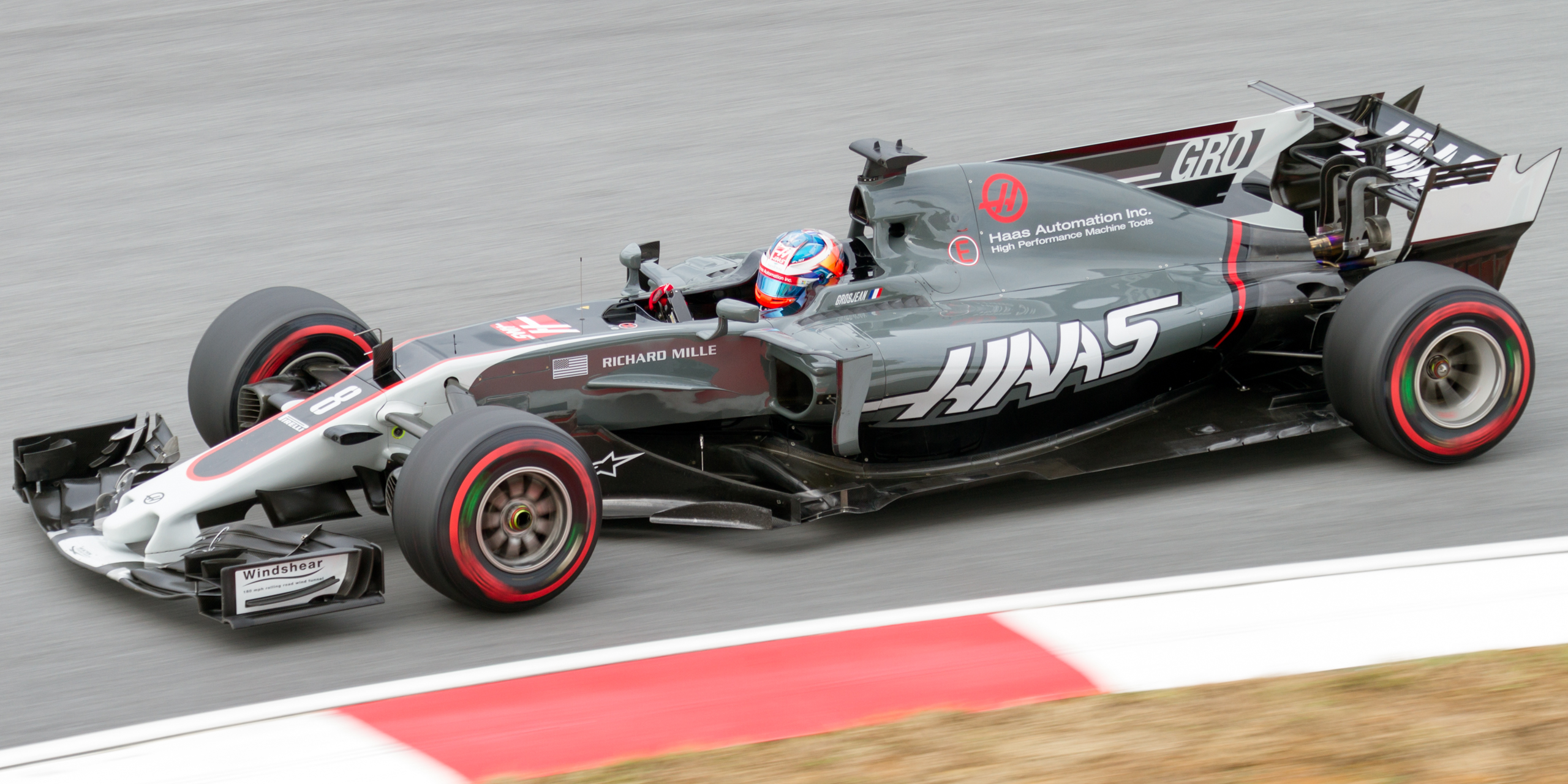
Grosjean at the 2017 Malaysian Grand Prix

Grosjean drove for Haas for the 2017 season where he partnered Kevin Magnussen. He had multiple retirements, such as in the 2017 Australian Grand Prix, where he retired due to a water leak. His second retirement came at the 2017 Russian Grand Prix, when he had a collision with Jolyon Palmer. His third and final retirement of the season was in the 2017 Hungarian Grand Prix due to a wheel nut. He scored 28 points in total from eight occasions and finished the season thirteenth.

==== 2018 ====
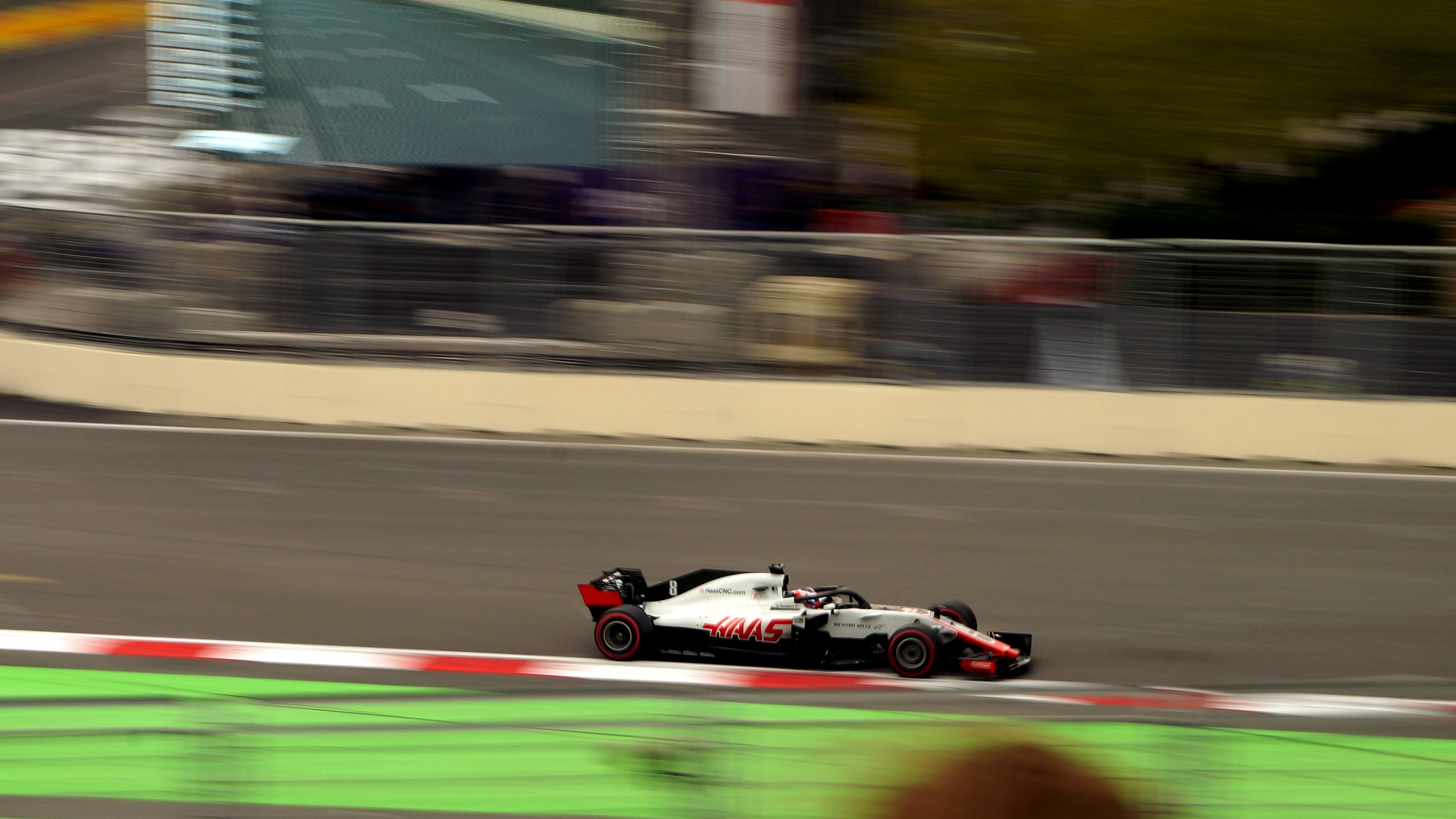
Grosjean at the 2018 Azerbaijan Grand Prix

Haas retained Grosjean for the 2018 season where he again partnered Magnussen. At the Azerbaijan Grand Prix, Grosjean crashed behind the safety car whilst running in sixth place. His engineer incorrectly blamed the cause of the crash on Sauber driver Marcus Ericsson, saying, "I think Ericsson hit us." At the Spanish Grand Prix, Grosjean was the cause of a crash on the opening lap. Whilst making his way through turn three, he lost control of his Haas after running through dirty air. This caused him to spin across the track into the path of the cars behind him, causing a large amount of smoke in the process. He was then hit by Hülkenberg and Gasly, eliminating all three from the race. In the Austrian Grand Prix, Grosjean finished fourth, his best result in his career at Haas, and his first points finish in 2018. Grosjean was disqualified from the Italian Grand Prix after the floor of his car was found to be illegal, taking away a sixth-place finish; although the team appealed this, the decision was upheld. Grosjean finished the season fourteenth with 37 points.

==== 2019 ====
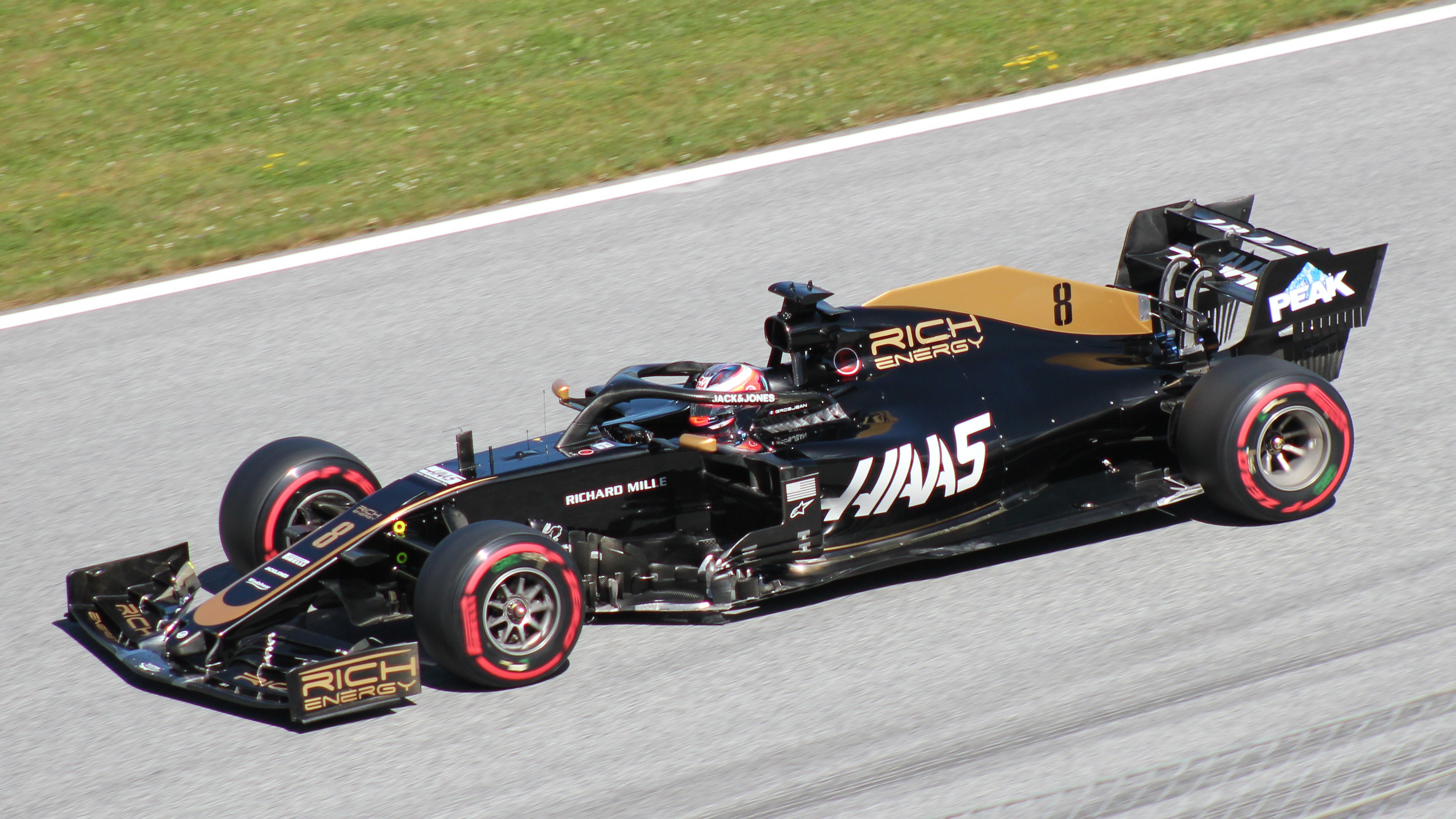
Grosjean at the 2019 Austrian Grand Prix

On 28 September 2018, it was confirmed that Haas would retain Grosjean for the 2019 season, again partnering Magnussen. Like his 2018 season, Grosjean's 2019 was plagued with reliability issues, poor luck and driver errors. Additionally, the Haas VF-19 suffered from poor pace throughout the season, often qualifying well but falling far behind during races.

The first two races saw a double retirement for Grosjean. In Australia, a wheel was incorrectly fitted during a pit stop, causing it to come loose on track in an extremely similar incident to his race in Australia the year before. In Bahrain, he was hit by Lance Stroll on the opening lap, causing terminal damage. An eleventh-place finish in China followed, before a third retirement in four races in Azerbaijan due to a brake failure. Grosjean scored his first point of the season by finishing tenth in Spain, and followed this up with another tenth-place finish in Monaco.

Grosjean finished fourteenth in Canada after a collision in front of him on the first lap sent debris into his car, causing him to lose positions. He then retired from the next race, his home race in France. Another retirement came two races later in Britain, after contact with teammate Magnussen on the first lap, ending the races of both drivers. Both were blamed and criticised for the incident, at a race in which Grosjean was testing the old spec of the VF-19 so that the team could understand their recent lack of pace. His best—and final—points finish of the season came in Germany, when he crossed the line in ninth place but was promoted to seventh after the Alfa Romeo drivers were penalised post-race for the use of driver aids.

Another retirement came in Hungary due to a hydraulics issue. In Singapore, Grosjean tagged George Russell during an overtake attempt, damaging his front wing and causing the Williams driver to crash into a wall. Grosjean finished the race in eleventh. Another retirement followed in Russia after a first-lap collision with Daniel Ricciardo and Antonio Giovinazzi sent him into the barriers. In Brazil, Grosjean was running in seventh place late in the race behind Pierre Gasly and ahead of Carlos Sainz Jr., before issues with his car dropped him back to fourteenth by the finish line (thirteenth after a penalty for Nico Hülkenberg). Gasly and Sainz would go on to finish second and third in the race.

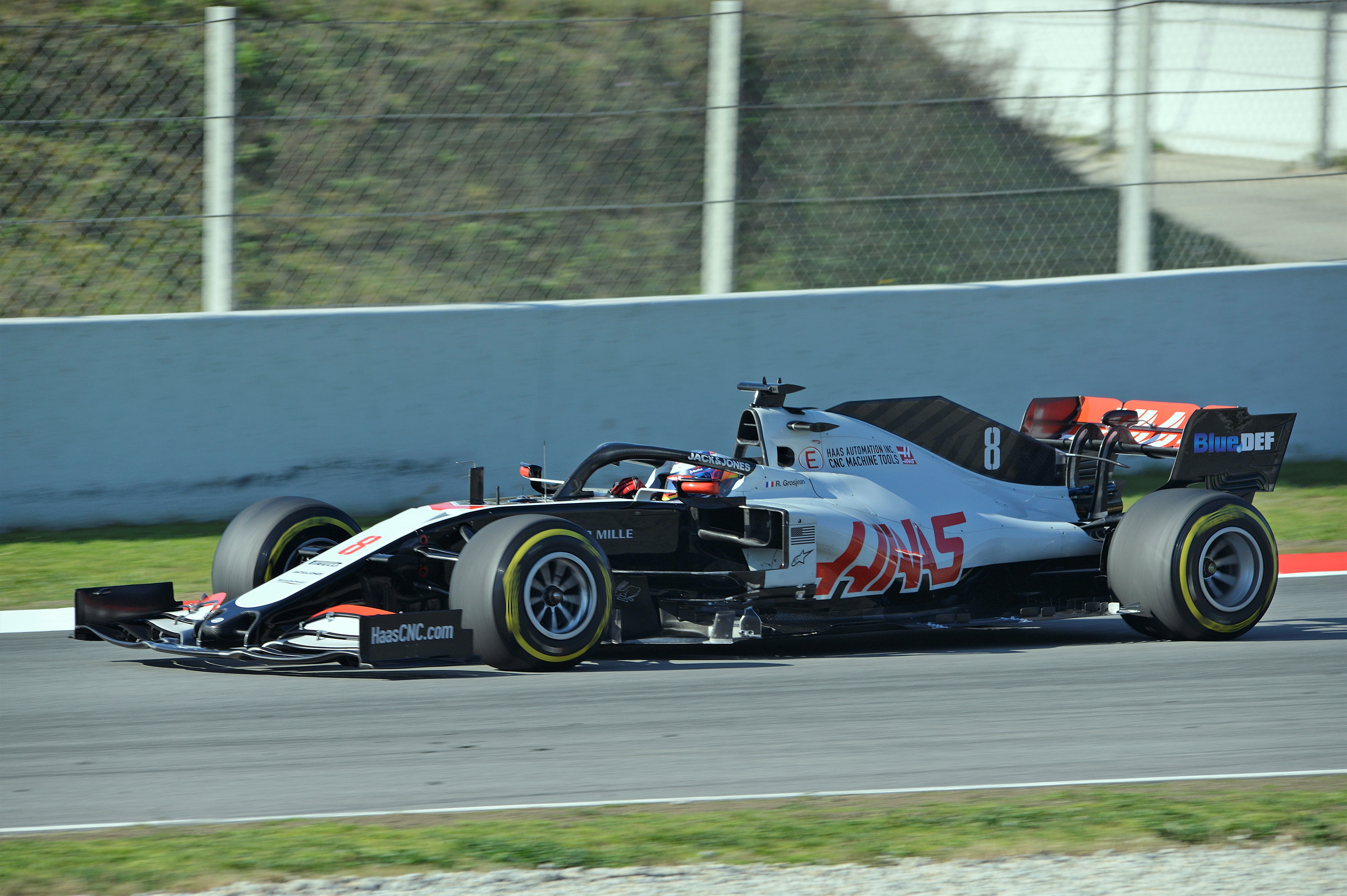
Grosjean at pre-season testing in 2020

Grosjean ended the season in eighteenth place in the championship with eight points, his worst full-season in Formula One.

==== 2020: Final season and accident ====
On 19 September 2019, Haas announced that Grosjean would remain with the team for the 2020 season alongside Magnussen.

Grosjean retired from the first race in Austria and finished thirteenth at the same venue a week later. His finish at Styria would prove to be his highest finish for the next six races, when he finished twelfth in Italy and again in Tuscany. He scored ninth in Germany for his only points of the season. Ahead of the Portuguese Grand Prix, Grosjean announced he and Magnussen were to leave Haas at the end of 2020.

In what would be his final race, Grosjean suffered a serious crash in the 2020 Bahrain Grand Prix on the first lap in which his Haas VF-20 made contact with the AlphaTauri AT01 of Daniil Kvyat, and hit the barrier at high speed, splitting the car in half, releasing the fuel and causing a significant fire. The force and angle of the impact caused the driver's compartment and the front half of the car to be wedged into the barrier, while the rear half was separated from the rest of the vehicle, igniting the car immediately upon impact.

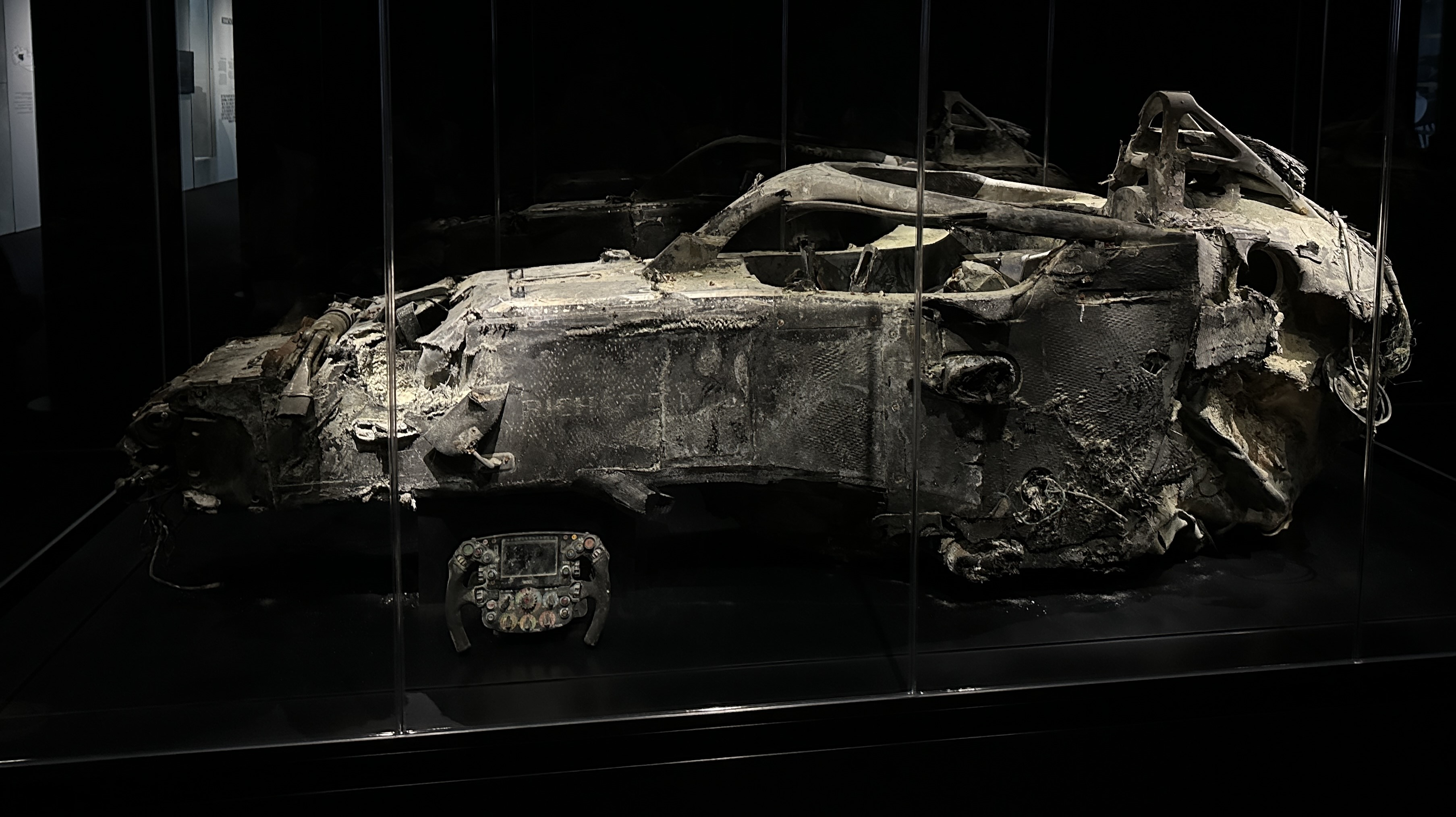
The front half of the wreckage of Grosjean's car, on display in 2023

The impact was measured at 67 g (660 m/s^{2}; 2,200 ft/s^{2}). He was able to exit the car unaided after 28 seconds, and was helped away from the crash scene by Alan van der Merwe and Ian Roberts, with minor burn injuries to his hands and ankles before being airlifted to a nearby military hospital. The crash caused a red flag for more than an hour to recover the chassis and repair the damaged barrier section. The halo head-protective device, introduced in Formula One in 2018, was credited with saving his life: it sheltered Grosjean's head and body from coming into contact with the barrier upon collision. Grosjean ultimately missed the last two races of the season, and was replaced by Haas reserve driver Pietro Fittipaldi. He underwent surgery for his injuries on 16 December.

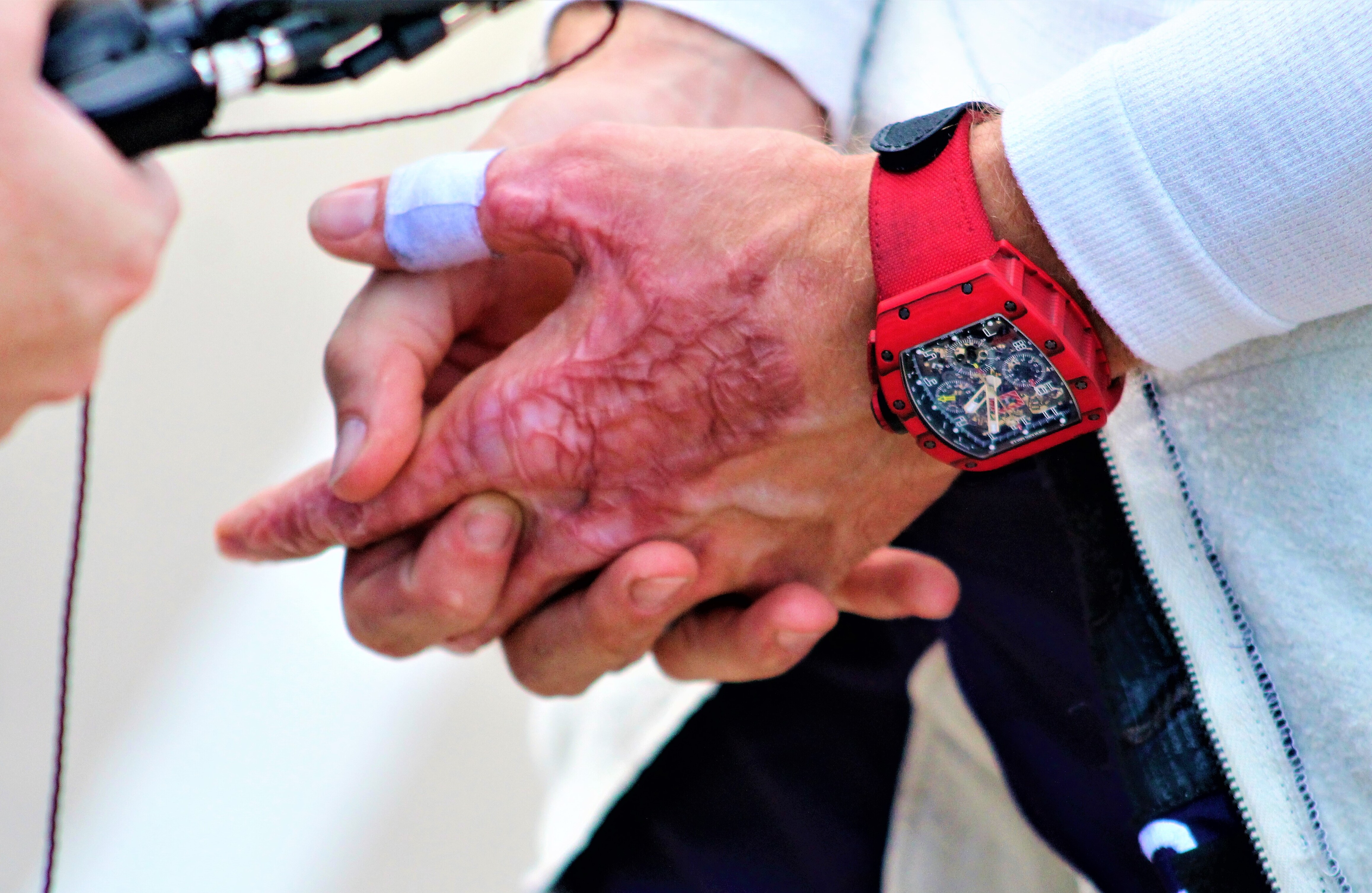
The state of Grosjean's hand burns in 2021.

Grosjean was due to test drive the Mercedes AMG F1 W10 EQ Power+, which won the 2019 Formula One World Championship, for a full day of testing with the team at the 2021 French Grand Prix. The test was delayed due to pandemic related travel restrictions. On 26 September 2025, Grosjean drove a Haas VF-23 in a test at Mugello, marking his return to Formula One machinery following his 2020 crash.

== IndyCar career ==
From 2021 onwards, Grosjean chose to compete in the IndyCar Series.

=== Dale Coyne (2021) ===
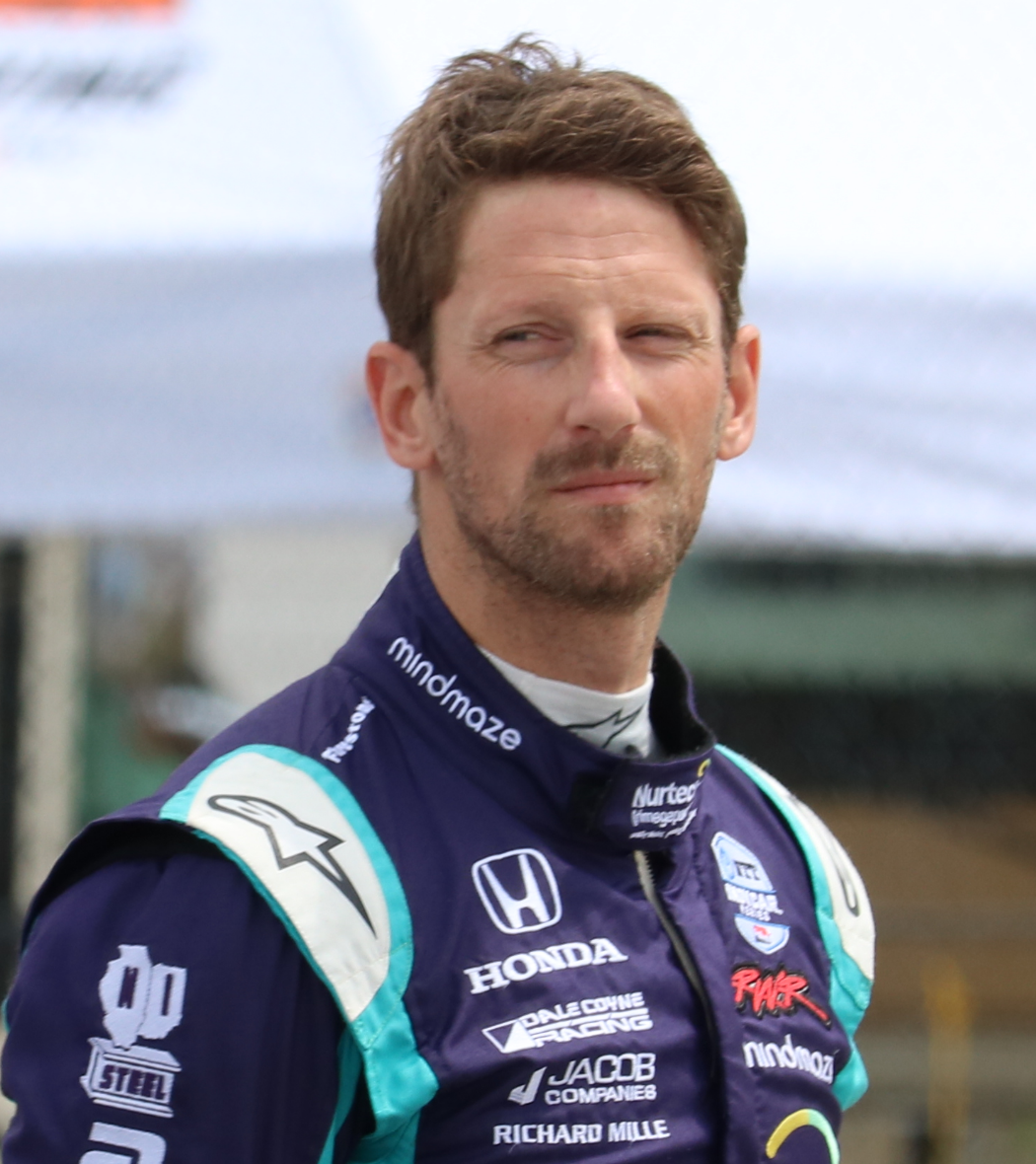
Grosjean at Road America in 2021

For 2021, Grosjean competed on a joint deal between Dale Coyne Racing and Rick Ware Racing with backing from Honda. Grosjean was scheduled to only participate in the street and road course events in the 2021 season but he later announced after the Indianapolis 500 that he would run the Bommarito Automotive Group 500 to get experience racing on ovals for a potential full schedule in 2022. Because his only oval race would be on what IndyCar considers a short oval Haas F1 Team colleague Pietro Fittipaldi was signed to replace Grosjean for IndyCar's three races on superspeedways, the double header at Texas Motor Speedway and the 2021 Indianapolis 500.

Grosjean quickly adapted to IndyCar racing and immediately showed pace. He recorded three podium finishes on the season; two second-place finishes at both rounds on the IMS Road Course and a third-place finish at Laguna Seca. In addition he made the final round of qualifying at both rounds on the IMS Road Course and Detroit, Nashville, and Long Beach. The highpoint of Grosjean's season was at the first round at Indianapolis, where after sitting out for two weeks he returned and out qualified fellow rookie Scott McLaughlin, Josef Newgarden, Jack Harvey, Conor Daly, and Alex Palou to earn his first IndyCar pole position and first pole position since May 2011, when he was on pole in GP2 at Istanbul Park with DAMS. He went on to finish in second place behind winner Rinus VeeKay. Other highlights included making up ten positions at Laguna Seca, several passes of which he made at the famed "Corkscrew", the location of Alex Zanardi's iconic pass on Bryan Herta in 1996, and his first ever oval race at Gateway, where he recorded the most overtakes for the race despite finishing fourteenth. Grosjean also recorded top ten finishes at Barber, Road America, and Mid-Ohio.

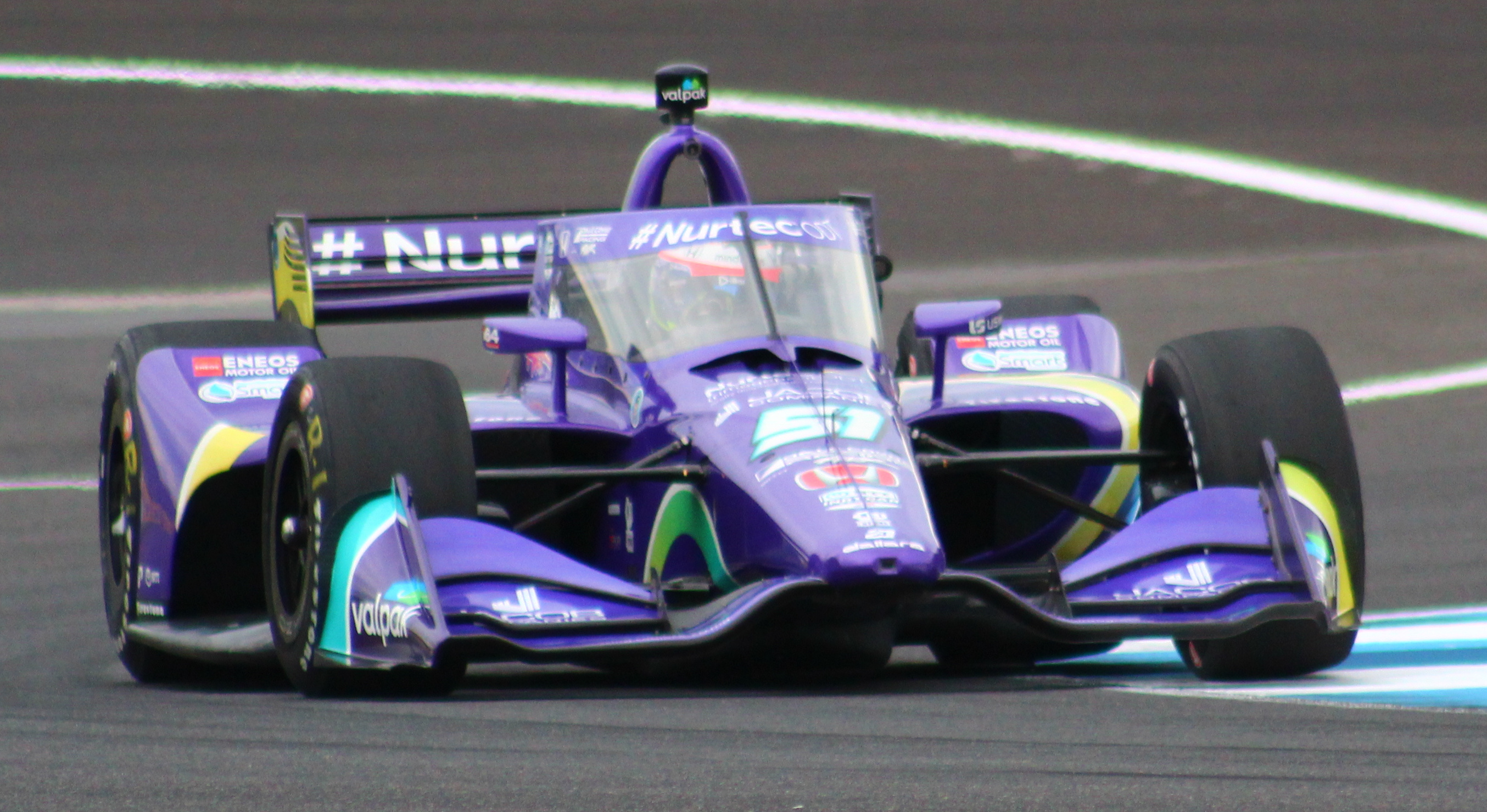
Grosjean at the Indianapolis Motor Speedway in 2021

Grosjean's arrival to IndyCar coincided with the arrival of three-time Supercars champion Scott McLaughlin and seven-time NASCAR champion Jimmie Johnson to the series, creating what some pundits dubbed the most intriguing rookie class to American open wheel racing since the arrival of Nigel Mansell to CART in the early 1990s. Many pundits picked Grosjean to have the strongest season of the three due to his extensive open-wheel experience, picking him to be a potential candidate for IndyCar Rookie of the Year despite competing for a team with significantly fewer resources than McLaughlin's Team Penske or Johnson's Chip Ganassi Racing and not racing a full schedule. While Johnson would be the slowest to adapt to IndyCar racing and would run the fewest events of the three, McLaughlin and Grosjean were frequently measured against each other throughout the season. McLaughlin outperformed Grosjean four times during their rookie seasons; at St. Petersburg where he had made his IndyCar debut the previous year while Grosjean was racing there for the first time, at Grosjean's first-ever oval race at Gateway, and at Portland and Long Beach after Grosjean was caught up in an accident caused by other drivers on the opening laps. Grosjean's performances were so strong that despite his partial schedule he was nearly able to outscore McLaughlin for the Rookie of the Year award heading into the final race at Long Beach. Both Grosjean and McLaughlin downplayed any comparisons between the two, with Grosjean noting that comparing the two's rookie results in IndyCar did not take into account his nearly two decades of open-wheel racing compared to only one year of open-wheel racing experience for McLaughlin.

=== Andretti (2022–2023) ===
==== 2022 ====
Grosjean drove Andretti Autosport's No. 28 DHL Honda entry in the 2022 season, replacing the outgoing Ryan Hunter-Reay. Grosjean underwent his rookie orientation at Indianapolis Motor Speedway on 5 October 2021, and confirmed that he will be racing in the 2022 Indianapolis 500 along with the entire 2022 schedule. Grosjean picked up his first podium with Andretti Autosport at Long Beach, nearly taking the win from Josef Newgarden before an accident caused by Takuma Sato caused the race to finish under caution. He managed to advance to Q2 in his first Indianapolis 500 but ultimately crashed out of the race. Overall, 2022 was a difficult season for Grosjean, as he struggled with bad luck and on track contact with teammates and other drivers.

==== 2023 ====
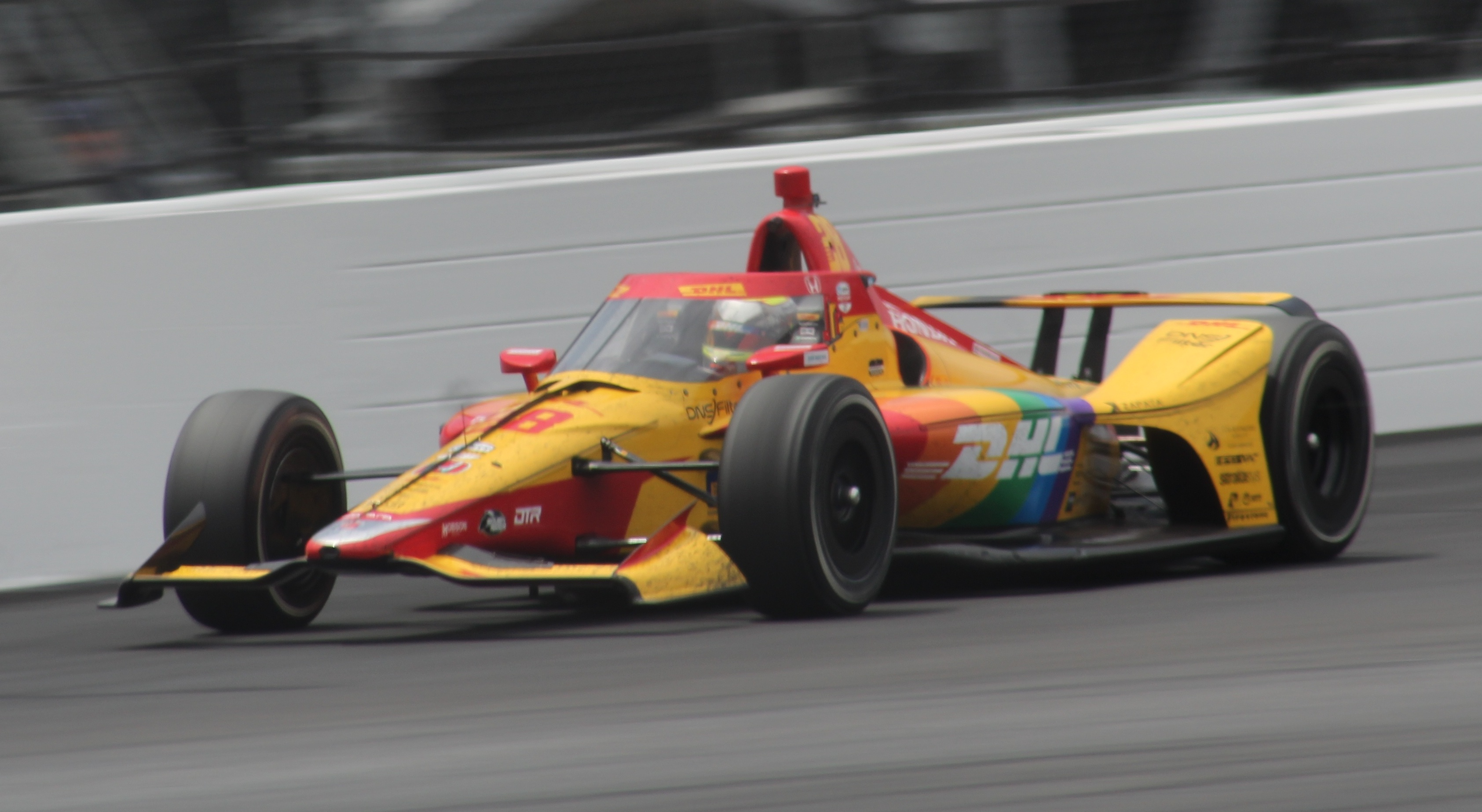
Grosjean driving for Andretti Autosport at the 2023 Indy 500

In 2023, Grosjean won the pole at the season opener but a late race collision with Scott McLaughlin ended his chances of a victory. He again crashed out at Texas when fighting for a podium finish before picking up two consecutive second-place finishes at Long Beach and Barber. The rest of the season was not a success as he suffered numerous DNFs and posted only one top-ten finish in the remaining thirteen races.

On 3 September, NBC reported that Grosjean would not be retained by Andretti for the 2024 season. A month later, Grosjean announced that he would be taking legal action against Andretti.

=== Juncos Hollinger (2024) ===
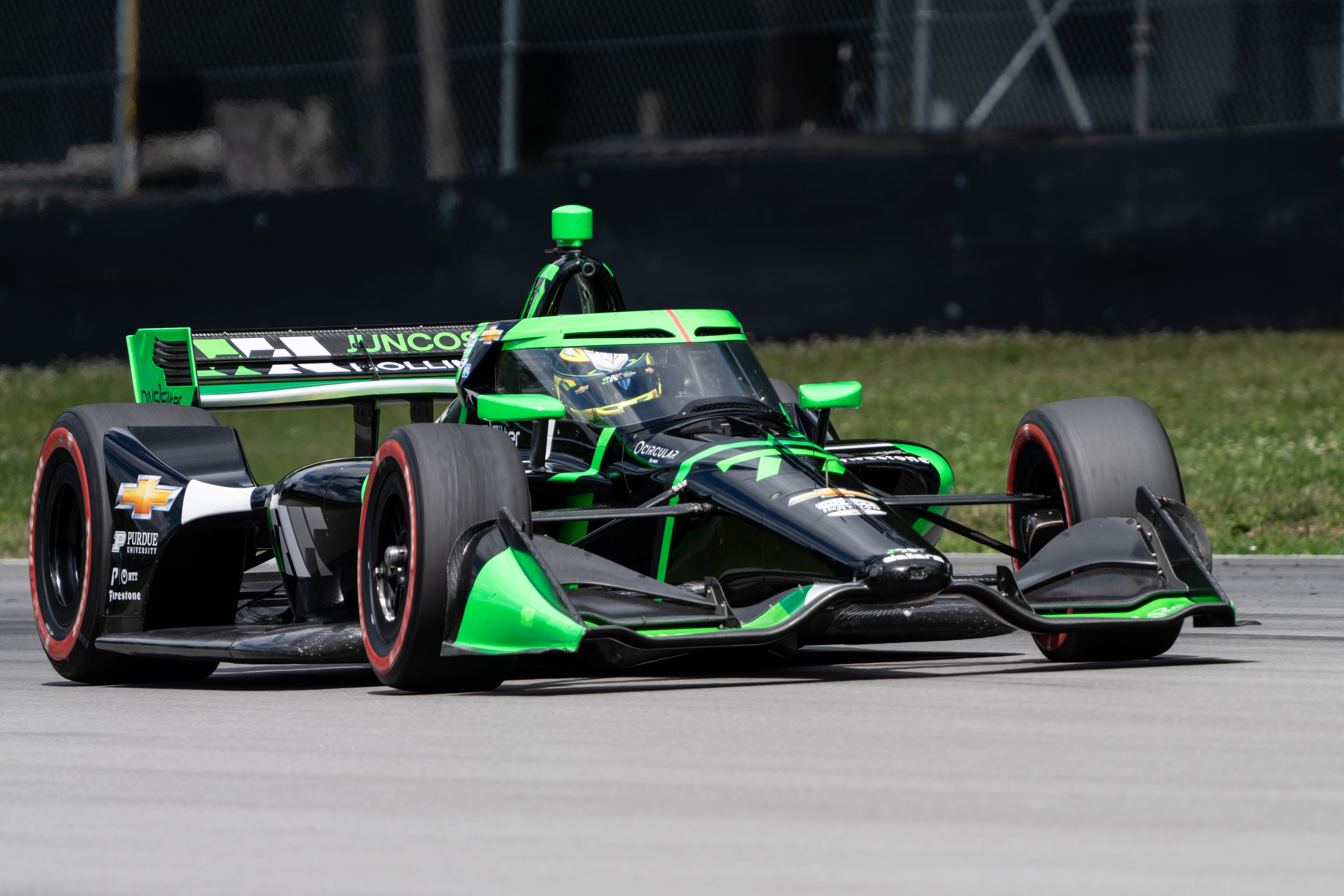
Grosjean driving in 2024 at Mid-Ohio

On 2 November, it was announced that Grosjean would be racing for the Juncos Hollinger Racing team for the 2024 season, replacing the departing Callum Ilott. This marked his first drive in IndyCar in a Chevrolet powered car, having raced in the No. 51 and No. 28 Honda cars with Dale Coyne and Andretti. He finished fourth in the 2024 Firestone Grand Prix of Monterey at Laguna Seca.

Grosjean was not kept at the team after 2024, with Juncos choosing to sign Sting Ray Robb and Conor Daly for the 2025 season.

=== Prema reserve driver (2025) ===
On 10 January 2025, it was confirmed that the new team Prema Racing would hire Grosjean as a reserve driver.

=== Return to Dale Coyne (2026) ===
On 13 February 2026, it was announced Grosjean signed with Dale Coyne Racing for the 2026 season. This was Grosjean's second stint with the team. Ahead of the 2026 Indianapolis 500, it was announced that his No. 18 car would be decorated with the same number font NASCAR driver Kyle Busch as a way to honor Busch, who had died in May.

== Endurance racing ==
=== Lamborghini factory driver (2022–2025) ===
Grosjean was added to the Lamborghini factory driver roster at the end of 2022. As part of his duties, he became a test driver for the upcoming Lamborghini SC63 Hypercar project, in addition to taking part in the opening two rounds of the 2023 IMSA SportsCar Championship in the GTD Pro class. He and his teammates finished fourth at the 2023 24 Hours of Daytona and 2023 12 Hours of Sebring.

Heading into 2024, Grosjean became part of the Lamborghini Hypercar programme in the 2024 IMSA SportsCar Championship, partnering Matteo Cairoli and Andrea Caldarelli at Sebring, Indianapolis, and Petit Le Mans. The trio finished seventh on debut at Sebring. Grosjean led a number of laps in the wet at Indianapolis, but the race ended prematurely after Caldarelli suffered contact with a Ford GT car. Grosjean also raced for Lamborghini at the 2024 24 Hours of Le Mans, finishing 13th.

Grosjean took part in the five endurance rounds of the 2025 IMSA SportsCar Championship, once again behind the wheel of the SC63. After retiring at Daytona and Sebring, Grosjean and teammate Daniil Kvyat finished seventh at Watkins Glen. Having placed tenth at Indianapolis, Grosjean and Lamborghini had their best race of the season at Petit Le Mans, placing fourth after a late fuel stop. With the SC63 programme coming to a close at the end of 2025, Grosjean left the Lamborghini factory roster.

=== Further IMSA starts (2026–) ===
At the start of 2026, Grosjean joined Myers Riley Motorsports to drive a Ford Mustang GT3 Evo at the 2026 Rolex 24 at Daytona. The car retired early in the race due to contact, before Grosjean had a chance to drive it.

== Personal life ==
Grosjean married French journalist and television presenter Marion Jollès on 27 June 2012 in Chamonix. They have been together since 2008. On 29 July 2013, Marion gave birth to a son. They have a second son, who was born on 16 May 2015, and a daughter, born on 31 December 2017.

After signing with Andretti Autosport and committed to racing full time in the IndyCar Series, he announced that he would be moving to Miami with his family. They chose Miami due to the city's selection of French-language schools and the ability to get direct flights between Miami and Paris.

Early in his motorsports career, Grosjean worked at a bank in Geneva.

Grosjean is a qualified pilot and frequently uploads videos related to flying on his YouTube channel.

== Other ventures ==
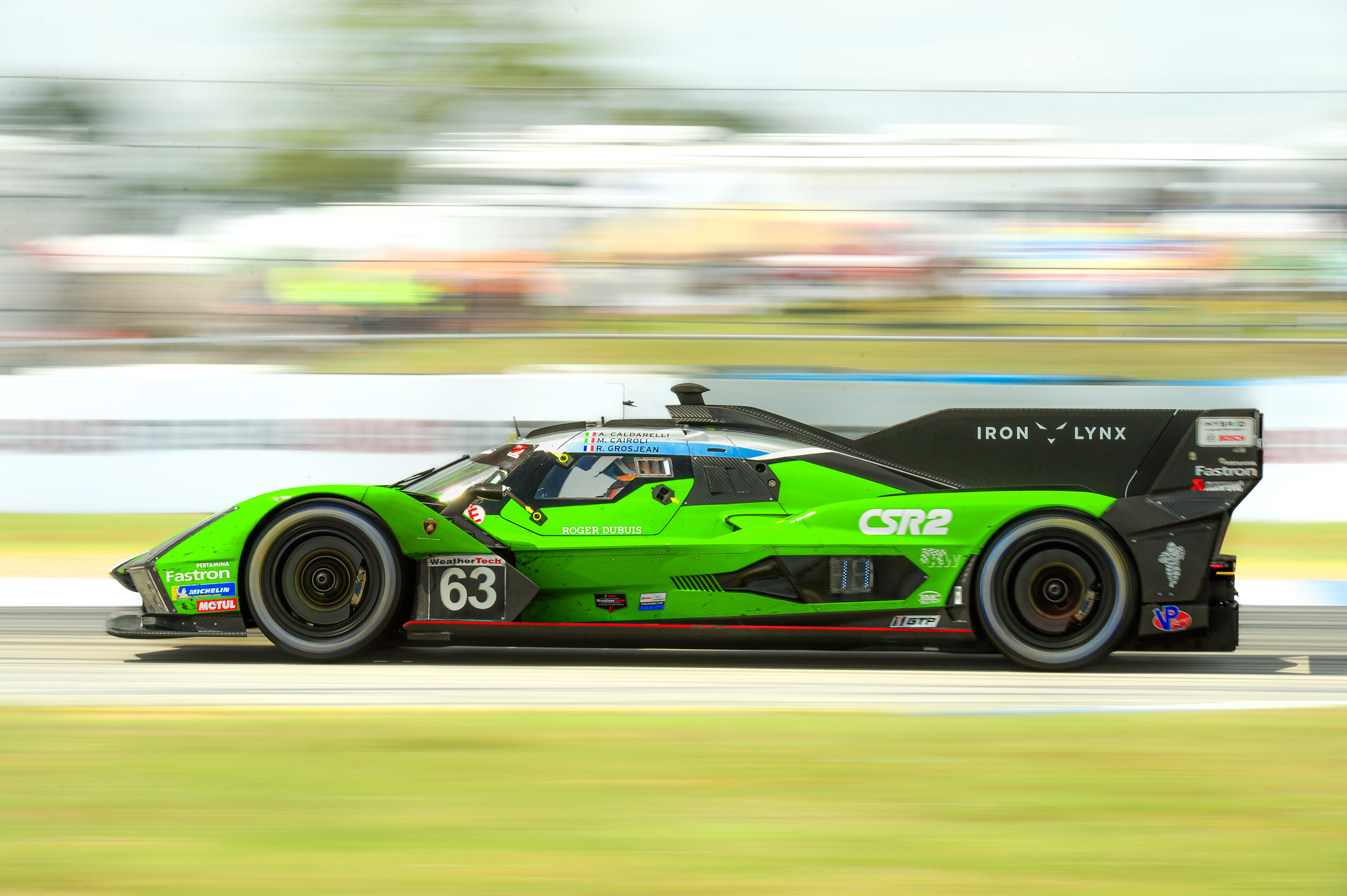
Grosjean driving the Lamborghini SC63 at the 2024 12 Hours of Sebring.

Grosjean holds endorsements with various brands including Christian Roth (Via DITA Eyewear), Richard Mille, Bell Sports, Seier Capital, and Field Pass.

In 2014, Grosjean was featured in French disc jockey David Guetta's music video titled "Dangerous".

In October 2017, Grosjean launched Cuisine et Confidences, a cookbook he authored with his wife.

Grosjean also founded R8G eSports, a sim racing team.

Grosjean also has his own YouTube channel called Romain Grosjean Official with 253K subscribers which he launched in November 2017.

In 2024, Grosjean became a partner in Field Pass Inc, a brand management and media company he worked with as a client in 2023.

== Racing record ==
=== Karting career summary ===
Season	Series	Team	Position
2001	French Championship — ICA		**1st**
2002	Grand Prix Karting FFSA — Espoir		34th
2002	Monaco Kart Cup — Formula A	Christian Grosjean	16th
2003	European Championship - Western Region Qualification — ICA	SG Compétition	DNF
2003	Grand Prix Karting FFSA — Espoir		34th
2011	ERDF Masters Kart — Stars		5th

=== Racing career summary ===
Season	Series	Team	Races	Wins	Poles	F/Laps	Podiums	Points	Position
2003	Formula Lista Junior 1.6	Advance Racing	10	10	?	?	10	?	**1st**
2004	French Formula Renault	SG Formula	14	1	2	1	4	130	7th
2004	Formula Renault 2000 Eurocup	SG Formula	9	0	0	0	0	32	14th
2005	French Formula Renault	SG Formula	16	10	10	0	13	211	**1st**
2005	Eurocup Formula Renault 2.0	SG Formula	7	0	0	0	2	28	12th
2005	Macau Grand Prix	Signature-Plus	1	0	0	0	0	N/A	9th
2006	Formula 3 Euro Series	Signature-Plus	20	0	0	0	1	19	13th
2006	British Formula 3 Championship	Signature-Plus	2	2	1	2	2	0	NC†
2006	Macau Grand Prix	Signature-Plus	1	0	0	0	0	N/A	5th
2007	Formula 3 Euro Series	ASM Formule 3	20	6	4	7	12	106	**1st**
2007	Masters of Formula 3	ASM Formule 3	1	0	1	0	0	N/A	14th
2007	Macau Grand Prix	ASM Formule 3	1	0	0	0	0	N/A	8th
2008	GP2 Series	ART Grand Prix	20	2	1	2	6	62	4th
2008	GP2 Asia Series	ART Grand Prix	10	4	4	3	5	61	**1st**
2009	GP2 Series	Barwa Addax Team	12	2	3	2	3	45	4th
2009	Formula One	Renault F1 Team (Note: Renault entered rounds 1–13 as "ING Renault F1 Team".)	7	0	0	0	0	0	23rd
2010	GP2 Series	DAMS	8	0	0	0	2	14	14th
2010	Auto GP	DAMS	8	4	3	4	7	58	**1st**
2010	FIA GT1 World Championship	Matech Competition	10	2	0	0	3	62	11th
2010	24 Hours of Le Mans - GT1	Matech Competition	1	0	0	0	0	N/A	DNF
2010	Formula One	Pirelli	Test driver						
2011	GP2 Series	DAMS	18	5	1	6	10	89	**1st**
2011	GP2 Asia Series	DAMS	4	1	2	2	2	24	**1st**
2011	Formula One	Lotus Renault GP	Test driver						
2012	Formula One	Lotus F1 Team	19	0	0	1	3	96	8th
2013	Formula One	Lotus F1 Team	19	0	0	0	6	132	7th
2014	Formula One	Lotus F1 Team	19	0	0	0	0	8	14th
2015	Formula One	Lotus F1 Team	19	0	0	0	1	51	11th
2016	Formula One	Haas F1 Team	21	0	0	0	0	29	13th
2016–17	Andros Trophy - Elite Pro Class	DA Racing	2	1	1	1	1	106	14th
2017	Formula One	Haas F1 Team	20	0	0	0	0	28	13th
2018	Formula One	Haas F1 Team	21	0	0	0	0	37	14th
2019	Formula One	Haas F1 Team (Note: Haas entered rounds 1–14 as "Rich Energy Haas F1 Team".)	21	0	0	0	0	8	18th
2020	Formula One	Haas F1 Team	15	0	0	0	0	2	19th
2021	IndyCar Series	Dale Coyne Racing w/ Rick Ware Racing	14	0	1	1	3	272	15th
2021–22	Andros Trophy - Elite Pro Class	DA Racing	4	0	0	0	0	174	14th
2022	IndyCar Series	Andretti Autosport	17	0	0	0	1	328	13th
2023	IndyCar Series	Andretti Autosport	17	0	2	0	2	296	13th
2023	IMSA SportsCar Championship - GTD Pro	Iron Lynx	2	0	0	0	0	612	14th
2024	IndyCar Series	Juncos Hollinger Racing	17	0	0	0	0	260	17th
2024	IMSA SportsCar Championship - GTP	Lamborghini-Iron Lynx	3	0	0	1	0	764	22nd
2024	24 Hours of Le Mans - Hypercar	Lamborghini-Iron Lynx	1	0	0	0	0	N/A	13th
2024	IMSA SportsCar Championship - GTD Pro	Iron Lynx	1	0	0	0	0	213	43rd
2025	IMSA SportsCar Championship - GTP	Automobili Lamborghini Squadra Corse	5	0	0	0	0	1209	15th
2025	IndyCar Series	Prema Racing	Reserve driver						
2026	IMSA SportsCar Championship - GTD	Myers Riley Motorsports	1	0	0	0	0	130	81st
2026	IndyCar Series	Dale Coyne Racing	18	0	0	0	1	259	19th

† As Grosjean was a guest driver, he was ineligible to score points.

=== Single seater racing results ===
==== Complete French Formula Renault results ====
(key) (Races in bold indicate pole position; races in italics indicate fastest lap)

Year	Team	1	2	3	4	5	6	7	8	9	10	11	12	13	14	15	16	Pos	Points
2004	SG Formula	NOG; 1; 17	NOG; 2; 3	VDV; 1 Ret	VDV; 2; 6	PAU; 1; 18	PAU; 2 Ret	**DIJ**; **1**; 1	**DIJ**; **2** Ret	ALB; 1; 2	ALB; 2; 3	LMS; 1; 6	LMS; 2 Ret	MAG; 1 Ret	MAG; 2; 5			7th	130
2005	SG Formula	**NOG**; **1**; 2	NOG; 2; 3	LÉD; 1 Ret	LÉD; 2; 5	**PAU**; **1**; 1	**PAU**; **2**; 1	**DIJ**; **1**; 1	**DIJ**; **2**; 1	VDV; 1 DSQ	**VDV**; **2**; 1	**LMS**; **1**; 1	LMS; 2; 1	**ALB**; **1**; 1	**ALB**; **2**; 1	**MAG**; **1**; 1	MAG; 2; 2	1st	211

==== Complete Eurocup Formula Renault 2.0 results ====
(key) (Races in bold indicate pole position; races in italics indicate fastest lap)

Year	Team	1	2	3	4	5	6	7	8	9	10	11	12	13	14	15	16	17	Pos	Points
2004	SG Formula	MNZ; 1; 7	MNZ; 2 Ret	VAL; 1; 10	VAL; 2; 13	MAG; 1; 6	MAG; 2; 24	HOC; 1	HOC; 2	BRN; 1	BRN; 2	DON; 1	DON; 2	SPA; 25	IMO; 1	IMO; 2	OSC; 1; 5	OSC; 2; 22	14th	32
2005	SG Formula	ZOL; 1 Ret	ZOL; 2; 5	VAL; 1; 3	VAL; 2; 2	LMS; 1	LMS; 2	BIL; 1	BIL; 2	OSC; 1	OSC; 2	DON; 1	DON; 2	EST; 1; 32	EST; 2 DNS	MNZ; 1 Ret	MNZ; 2; 24		12th	28

==== Complete Formula 3 Euro Series results ====
(key) (Races in bold indicate pole position; races in italics indicate fastest lap)

Year	Team	Chassis	Engine	1	2	3	4	5	6	7	8	9	10	11	12	13	14	15	16	17	18	19	20	Pos	Points
2006	Signature-Plus	Dallara F305/029	Mercedes	HOC; 1; 21	HOC; 2; 13	LAU; 1; 6	LAU; 2; 4	OSC; 1; 3	OSC; 2; 6	BRH; 1; 9	BRH; 2; 6	NOR; 1; 12	NOR; 2; 8	NÜR; 1; 18	NÜR; 2; 10	ZAN; 1; 4	ZAN; 2; 11	CAT; 1 Ret	CAT; 2; 9	BUG; 1; 20	BUG; 2; 12	HOC; 1 DSQ	HOC; 2 DSQ	13th	19
2007	ASM Formule 3	Dallara F305/059	Mercedes	HOC; 1; 5	HOC; 2; 1	BRH; 1; 1	BRH; 2 Ret	NOR; 1; 1	NOR; 2 Ret	MAG; 1; 2	MAG; 2; 7	**MUG**; **1**; 1	MUG; 2; 2	**ZAN**; **1**; 1	ZAN; 2; 3	NÜR; 1; 5	NÜR; 2; 2	CAT; 1; 8	CAT; 2 DSQ	**NOG**; **1**; 1	NOG; 2; 3	**HOC**; **1**; 2	HOC; 2; 3	**1st**	**106**

==== Complete GP2 Asia Series results ====
(key) (Races in bold indicate pole position; races in italics indicate fastest lap)

Year	Entrant	1	2	3	4	5	6	7	8	9	10	DC	Points
2008	ART Grand Prix	**DUB1**; **FEA**; 1	DUB1; SPR; 1	SEN; FEA; 4	SEN; SPR; 4	**SEP**; **FEA**; 9	SEP; SPR; 2	**BHR**; **FEA**; 1	BHR; SPR; Ret	**DUB2**; **FEA**; 1	DUB2; SPR; Ret	**1st**	**61**
2011	DAMS	**YMC**; **FEA**; 2	YMC; SPR; Ret	**IMO**; **FEA**; 1	IMO; SPR; 7							**1st**	**24**

==== Complete GP2 Series results ====
(key) (Races in bold indicate pole position; races in italics indicate fastest lap)

Year	Entrant	1	2	3	4	5	6	7	8	9	10	11	12	13	14	15	16	17	18	19	20	DC	Points
2008	ART Grand Prix	CAT; FEA; 5	CAT; SPR; 13	IST; FEA; 2	IST; SPR; 1	MON; FEA; Ret	MON; SPR; 10	MAG; FEA; Ret	MAG; SPR; Ret	SIL; FEA; 5	SIL; SPR; 8	HOC; FEA; 2	HOC; SPR; 4	**HUN**; **FEA**; 17	HUN; SPR; 12	VAL; FEA; 3	VAL; SPR; Ret	SPA; FEA; 1	SPA; SPR; 9	MNZ; FEA; 4	MNZ; SPR; 3	4th	62
2009	Barwa Addax Team	**CAT**; **FEA**; 1	CAT; SPR; 2	**MON**; **FEA**; 1	MON; SPR; 17^{†}	IST; FEA; Ret	IST; SPR; 12	**SIL**; **FEA**; 5	SIL; SPR; 4	NÜR; FEA; 18^{†}	NÜR; SPR; 5	HUN; FEA; 10	HUN; SPR; 4	VAL; FEA	VAL; SPR	SPA; FEA	SPA; SPR	MNZ; FEA	MNZ; SPR	ALG; FEA	ALG; SPR	4th	45
2010	DAMS	CAT; FEA	CAT; SPR	MON; FEA	MON; SPR	IST; FEA	IST; SPR	VAL; FEA	VAL; SPR	SIL; FEA	SIL; SPR	HOC; FEA; 20	HOC; SPR; 19^{†}	HUN; FEA	HUN; SPR	SPA; FEA; 3	SPA; SPR; 6	MNZ; FEA; 13	MNZ; SPR; 17^{†}	YMC; FEA; 6	YMC; SPR; 3	14th	14
2011	DAMS	**IST**; **FEA**; 1	IST; SPR; 10	CAT; FEA; DSQ	CAT; SPR; 9	MON; FEA; 4	MON; SPR; 3	VAL; FEA; 1	VAL; SPR; Ret	SIL; FEA; 4	SIL; SPR; 1	NÜR; FEA; 3	NÜR; SPR; 1	HUN; FEA; 1	HUN; SPR; 3	SPA; FEA; 3	SPA; SPR; 4	MNZ; FEA; 3	MNZ; SPR; 21			**1st**	**89**

==== Complete Auto GP results ====
(key) (Races in bold indicate pole position; races in italics indicate fastest lap)

Year	Entrant	1	2	3	4	5	6	7	8	9	10	11	12	Pos	Points
2010	DAMS	BRN; 1	BRN; 2	IMO; 1	IMO; 2	**SPA**; **1**; 1	SPA; 2; 2	**MAG**; **1**; 1	MAG; 2 Ret	NAV; 1; 3	NAV; 2; 1	**MNZ**; **1**; 1	MNZ; 2; 3	**1st**	**58**

==== Complete Formula One results ====
(key) (Races in bold indicate pole position; races in italics indicate fastest lap)

Year	Entrant	Chassis	Engine	1	2	3	4	5	6	7	8	9	10	11	12	13	14	15	16	17	18	19	20	21	WDC	Points
2009	Renault F1 Team	Renault R29	Renault RS27 2.4 V8	AUS	MAL	CHN	BHR	ESP	MON	TUR	GBR	GER	HUN	EUR; 15	BEL; Ret	ITA; 15	SIN; Ret	JPN; 16	BRA; 13	ABU; 18					23rd	0
2011	Lotus Renault GP	Renault R31	Renault RS27-2011 2.4 V8	AUS	MAL	CHN	TUR	ESP	MON	CAN	EUR	GBR	GER	HUN	BEL	ITA	SIN	JPN	KOR	IND	ABU; TD	BRA; TD			–	–
2012	Lotus F1 Team	Lotus E20	Renault RS27-2012 2.4 V8	AUS; Ret	MAL; Ret	CHN; 6	BHR; 3	ESP; 4	MON; Ret	CAN; 2	EUR; Ret	GBR; 6	GER; 18	HUN; 3	BEL; Ret	ITA	SIN; 7	JPN; 19^{†}	KOR; 7	IND; 9	ABU; Ret	USA; 7	BRA; Ret		8th	96
2013	Lotus F1 Team	Lotus E21	Renault RS27-2013 2.4 V8	AUS; 10	MAL; 6	CHN; 9	BHR; 3	ESP; Ret	MON; Ret	CAN; 13	GBR; 19^{†}	GER; 3	HUN; 6	BEL; 8	ITA; 8	SIN; Ret	KOR; 3	JPN; 3	IND; 3	ABU; 4	USA; 2	BRA; Ret			7th	132
2014	Lotus F1 Team	Lotus E22	Renault Energy F1‑2014 1.6 V6 t	AUS; Ret	MAL; 11	BHR; 12	CHN; Ret	ESP; 8	MON; 8	CAN; Ret	AUT; 14	GBR; 12	GER; Ret	HUN; Ret	BEL; Ret	ITA; 16	SIN; 13	JPN; 15	RUS; 17	USA; 11	BRA; 17^{†}	ABU; 13			14th	8
2015	Lotus F1 Team	Lotus E23 Hybrid	Mercedes PU106B Hybrid 1.6 V6 t	AUS; Ret	MAL; 11	CHN; 7	BHR; 7	ESP; 8	MON; 12	CAN; 10	AUT; Ret	GBR; Ret	HUN; 7	BEL; 3	ITA; Ret	SIN; 13^{†}	JPN; 7	RUS; Ret	USA; Ret	MEX; 10	BRA; 8	ABU; 9			11th	51
2016	Haas F1 Team	Haas VF-16	Ferrari 061 1.6 V6 t	AUS; 6	BHR; 5	CHN; 19	RUS; 8	ESP; Ret	MON; 13	CAN; 14	EUR; 13	AUT; 7	GBR; Ret	HUN; 14	GER; 13	BEL; 13	ITA; 11	SIN; DNS	MAL; Ret	JPN; 11	USA; 10	MEX; 20	BRA; DNS	ABU; 11	13th	29
2017	Haas F1 Team	Haas VF-17	Ferrari 062 1.6 V6 t	AUS; Ret	CHN; 11	BHR; 8	RUS; Ret	ESP; 10	MON; 8	CAN; 10	AZE; 13	AUT; 6	GBR; 13	HUN; Ret	BEL; 7	ITA; 15	SIN; 9	MAL; 13	JPN; 9	USA; 14	MEX; 15	BRA; 15	ABU; 11		13th	28
2018	Haas F1 Team	Haas VF-18	Ferrari 062 EVO 1.6 V6 t	AUS; Ret	BHR; 13	CHN; 17	AZE; Ret	ESP; Ret	MON; 15	CAN; 12	FRA; 11	AUT; 4	GBR; Ret	GER; 6	HUN; 10	BEL; 7	ITA; DSQ	SIN; 15	RUS; 11	JPN; 8	USA; Ret	MEX; 16	BRA; 8	ABU; 9	14th	37
2019	Haas F1 Team	Haas VF-19	Ferrari 064 1.6 V6 t	AUS; Ret	BHR; Ret	CHN; 11	AZE; Ret	ESP; 10	MON; 10	CAN; 14	FRA; Ret	AUT; 16	GBR; Ret	GER; 7	HUN; Ret	BEL; 13	ITA; 16	SIN; 11	RUS; Ret	JPN; 13	MEX; 17	USA; 15	BRA; 13	ABU; 15	18th	8
2020	Haas F1 Team	Haas VF-20	Ferrari 065 1.6 V6 t	AUT; Ret	STY; 13	HUN; 16	GBR; 16	70A; 16	ESP; 19	BEL; 15	ITA; 12	TUS; 12	RUS; 17	EIF; 9	POR; 17	EMI; 14	TUR; Ret	BHR; Ret	SKH	ABU					19th	2

^{†} Did not finish, but was classified as he had completed more than 90% of the race distance.

=== American open-wheel racing results ===
==== IndyCar Series ====
(key) (Races in bold indicate pole position; races in italics indicate fastest lap)

Year	Team	No.	Chassis	Engine	1	2	3	4	5	6	7	8	9	10	11	12	13	14	15	16	17	18	Rank	Points	Ref
2021	Dale Coyne Racing w/ Rick Ware Racing	51	Dallara DW12	Honda	ALA; 10	STP; 13	TXS	TXS	**IMS**; 2	INDY	DET; 23	DET; 24	ROA; 5	MOH; 7	NSH; 16	IMS; 2	GTW; 14	POR; 22	LAG; 3	LBH; 24			15th	272	
2022	Andretti Autosport	28	Dallara DW12	Honda	STP; 5	TXS; 26	LBH; 2	ALA; 7	IMS; 17	INDY; 31	DET; 17	ROA; 4	MOH; 21	TOR; 16	IOW; 7	IOW; 9	IMS; 16	NSH; 16	GTW; 13	POR; 19	LAG; 7		13th	328	
2023	Andretti Autosport	28	Dallara DW12	Honda	**STP**; 18	TXS; 14	LBH; 2	**ALA**; 2	IMS; 11	INDY; 30	DET; 24	ROA; 25	MOH; 13	TOR; 22	IOW; 11	IOW; 12	NSH; 6	IMS; 18	GTW; 12	POR; 27	LAG; 11		13th	296	
2024	Juncos Hollinger Racing	77	Dallara DW12	Chevrolet	STP; 22	THE; DNQ	LBH; 8	ALA; 12	IMS; 12	INDY; 19	DET; 23	ROA; 7	LAG; 4	MOH; 23	IOW; 24	IOW; 10	TOR; 9	GTW; 16	POR; 27	MIL; 24	MIL; 9	NSH; 16	17th	260	
2026	Dale Coyne Racing	18	Dallara DW12	Honda	STP; 8	PHX; 25	ARL; 23	ALA; 15	LBH; 21	IMS; 21	INDY; 9	DET; 20	GTW; 15	ROA; 15	MOH; 23	NSH; 14	POR; 17	MRK; 2	WSH; 10	MIL; 19	MIL; 24	LAG; 18	19th	259	

- ^{NC} Non-championship event

==== Indianapolis 500 ====
Year	Chassis	Engine	Start	Finish	Team
2022	Dallara	Honda	9	31	Andretti Autosport
2023	Dallara	Honda	19	30	Andretti Autosport
2024	Dallara	Chevrolet	26	19	Juncos Hollinger Racing
2026	Dallara	Honda	24	9	Dale Coyne Racing

=== Sports car racing results ===
==== Complete GT1 World Championship results ====
(key)

Year	Team	Car	1	2	3	4	5	6	7	8	9	10	11	12	13	14	15	16	17	18	19	20	Pos	Points
2010	Matech Competition	Ford GT1	ABU; QR; 2	ABU; CR; 1	SIL; QR; 21	SIL; CR; Ret	BRN; QR; 6	BRN; CR; 1	PRI; QR; 7	PRI; CR; 7	SPA; QR; 20	SPA; CR; 14	NÜR; QR	NÜR; CR	ALG; QR	ALG; CR	NAV; QR	NAV; CR	INT; QR	INT; CR	SAN; QR	SAN; CR	11th	62

==== 24 Hours of Le Mans results ====
Year	Team	Co-Drivers	Car	Class	Laps	Pos.	Class Pos.
2010	(Switzerland) Matech Competition	(Germany) Thomas Mutsch (Switzerland) Jonathan Hirschi	Ford GT1	GT1	171	DNF	DNF
2024	(Italy) Lamborghini Iron Lynx	(Italy) Matteo Cairoli (Italy) Andrea Caldarelli	Lamborghini SC63	Hypercar	309	13th	13th

==== Complete IMSA SportsCar Championship results ====
(key) (Races in bold indicate pole position; results in italics indicate fastest lap)

Year	Team	Class	Make	Engine	1	2	3	4	5	6	7	8	9	10	11	Pos.	Points
2023	Iron Lynx	GTD Pro	Lamborghini Huracán GT3 Evo 2	Lamborghini 5.2 L V10	DAY; 4	SEB; 4	LBH	LGA	WGL	MOS	LIM	ELK	VIR	IMS	PET	14th	612
2024	Iron Lynx	GTD Pro	Lamborghini Huracán GT3 Evo 2	Lamborghini 5.2 L V10	DAY; 12						MOS		VIR			43rd	213
2024	Lamborghini – Iron Lynx	GTP	Lamborghini SC63	Lamborghini 3.8 L twin-turbo V8		SEB; 7	LBH	LGA	DET	WGL		ELK		IMS; 8	PET; 8	22nd	764
2025	Automobili Lamborghini Squadra Corse	GTP	Lamborghini SC63	Lamborghini 3.8 L Turbo V8	DAY; 12	SEB; 13	LBH	LGA	DET	WGL; 7	ELK	IMS; 10	PET; 4			15th	1209
2026	Myers Riley Motorsports	GTD	Ford Mustang GT3	Ford Coyote 5.4 L V8	DAY; 19	SEB	LBH	LGA	WGL	MOS	ELK	VIR	IMS	PET		81st	130

== Notes ==
Sporting positions
Preceded by Damian Sawicki	Formula Lista Junior; Champion; 2003	Succeeded by Harald Schlegelmilch
Preceded by Patrick Pilet	French Formula Renault; Champion; 2005	Succeeded by Laurent Groppi
Preceded by Paul di Resta	Formula 3 Euro Series; Champion; 2007	Succeeded by Nico Hülkenberg
Preceded by Inaugural	GP2 Asia Series; Champion; 2008	Succeeded by Kamui Kobayashi
Preceded by Will Bratt	Auto GP; Champion; 2010	Succeeded by Kevin Ceccon
Preceded by Davide Valsecchi	GP2 Asia Series; Champion; 2011	Succeeded by Series folded
Preceded by Pastor Maldonado	GP2 Series; Champion; 2011	Succeeded by Davide Valsecchi
Preceded by Sébastien Ogier	Race of Champions; Champion of Champions; 2012	Succeeded by David Coulthard (2014)
