= Bertrand Baguette =

Belgian professional racing driver (born 1986)

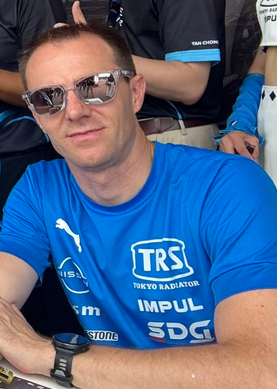
- Baguette at the 2025 Super GT Malaysia Festival
- Nationality: (Belgium) Belgian
- Born: Bertrand Marcel Nicolas Baguette; 23 February 1986 (age 40) Verviers, Belgium

Super GT - GT500 career
- Debut season: 2014
- Current team: Team Impul
- Categorisation: FIA Platinum
- Car number: 12
- Former teams: Nakajima Racing, Real Racing
- Starts: 105
- Wins: 6
- Podiums: 18
- Poles: 2
- Best finish: 1st in 2022

Previous series
- 2015–2016 2013 2010–11 2008 2008 2008 2007–09 2005–06 2005–06 2004: Super Formula Championship; FIA WEC; IndyCar Series; FIA GT Championship; Superleague Formula; Belgian Touring Cars S1; Formula Renault 3.5 Series; Formula Renault Eurocup; French Formula Renault 2.0; Formula Renault Belgium

Championship titles
- 2022 2013 2009: Super GT - GT500; FIA WEC LMP2 class Formula Renault 3.5 Series

Bertrand Marcel Nicolas Baguette (born 23 February 1986) is a Belgian professional racing driver. In 2013, he won the 24 Hours of Le Mans in the LMP2 class and the FIA WEC LMP2 class title. In 2017, he won the final running of the Suzuka 1000km in Super GT. Bertrand is the 2022 Super GT GT500 Champion with Nissan.

== Career ==
=== Karting ===
At the age of fourteen, Baguette began karting in his inter-provincial championship, driving "Blue" class karts, in which he finished fifth. He then moved up to junior level for 2001, competing again in the inter-provincial championship but also competed in the national championship for the first time. He finished third in the provincial level championship, but was four places lower in the national. Baguette competed in four different Intercontinental A class championships in 2002, with a runner-up position at the provincial level, despite competing in only certain events due to prior higher-ranked commitments in the Belgian, French or European championships. He then completed in a fourth year of karting, winning the Belgian Championship and again finished runner-up in a partial campaign in the provincial championship. He also won a scholarship to give him a drive in 1600cc Formula Renault Belgium.

=== Formula Renault ===
Baguette moved into single seater racing in 2004. He entered in the Belgian Formula Renault 1600cc with Marc Goossens Motorsport that year, as part of his scholarship win. He finished a strong third in the championship, amassing three wins and four poles during the season.

The next season, Baguette moved to both Eurocup Formula Renault 2.0 and French Formula Renault 2.0 championships with Epsilon Euskadi. He finished eighth (tied on points with seventh Junior Strous) in the European championship and eleventh in the French one, including a second place at Pau. He continued in both series in 2006 with a fourth place overall in the Eurocup, including five podiums and a win at Le Mans, finishing just 11 points behind championship winner Filipe Albuquerque. He finished in eighth in the French championship, again for Epsilon Euskadi.

In 2007, Baguette entered the 3.5-litre Formula Renault 3.5 Series with the eponymous Kurt Mollekens-run KTR team, in which he took two podium finishes in his first season. He was close to win his first race in this category at Autodromo Nazionale Monza before a blown tyre. He continued in the category in 2008, driving for the Italian team Draco with which he scored his first win at Spa and ended seventh in the championship.

Baguette continued with Draco for the 2009 season. A steady start, with four podiums, left Baguette tied on points with Marcos Martínez before the Silverstone meeting. During the second half of the season, Baguette raised his rhythm to put himself with an unassailable 34-point championship lead with a round to go. Baguette eventually won both races of the last meeting of the season at Ciudad del Motor de Aragón, thus winning the championship by 57 points from Fairuz Fauzy. During his 2009 campaign, Baguette scored fives wins and ten podiums.

As a prize for his championship win, Baguette was given the opportunity to test the Renault R29 Formula One car at Jerez on 1 December 2009. He also tested the BMW Sauber F1.09 car on 3 December.

=== IndyCar Series ===
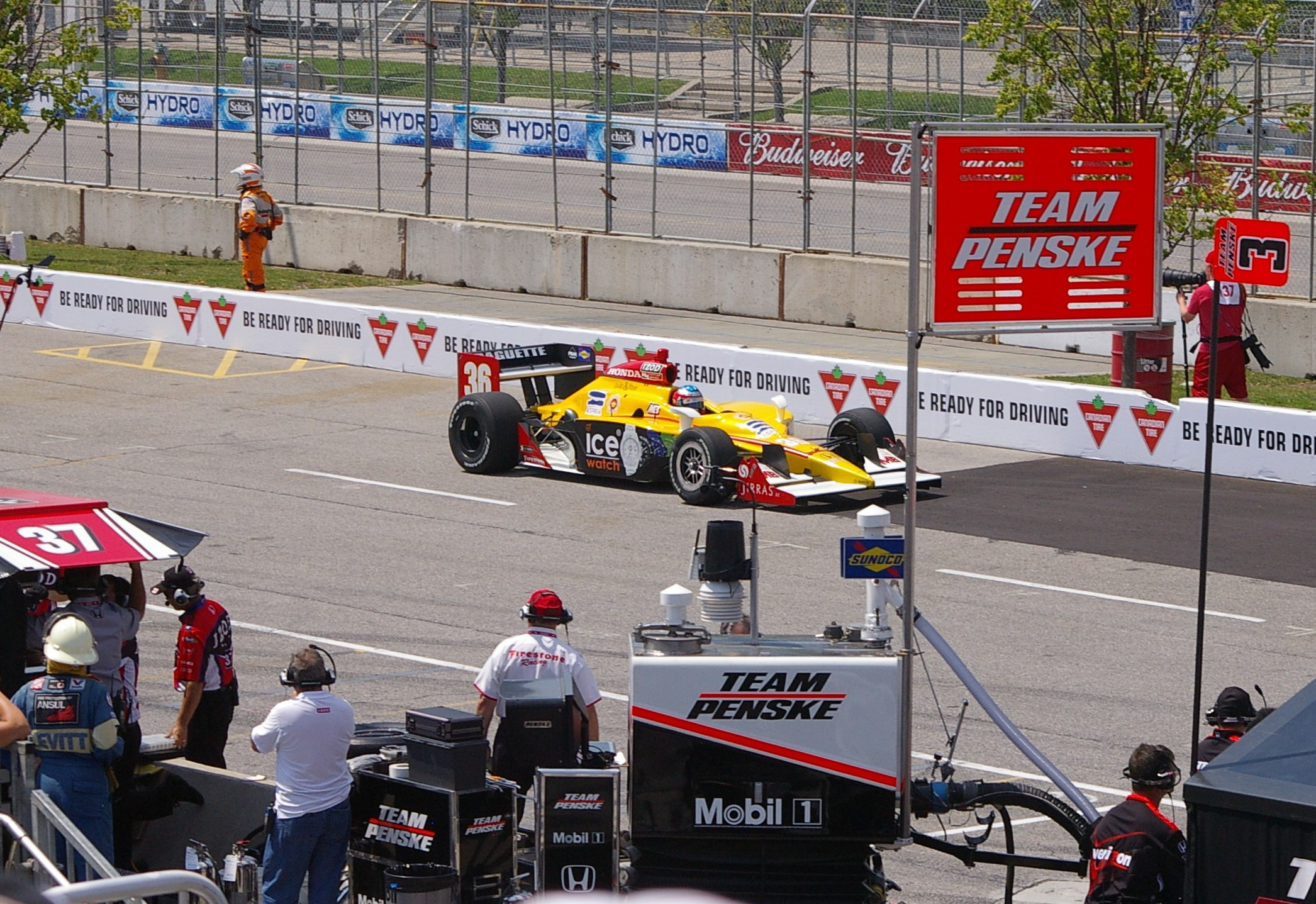
Baguette at the 2010 Honda Indy Toronto

On 22 March 2010, Conquest Racing announced that Baguette would drive their second car in the IndyCar Series, starting with the Indy Grand Prix of Alabama on 11 April.

Baguette qualified 24th for the 2010 Indianapolis 500 and finished 22nd after losing several laps in the pits to replace a rear-view mirror that had fallen off.

With some strong performances throughout the season, especially on ovals, Baguette managed a best finish of tenth at Kentucky, after qualifying sixth.

Due to a lack of budget, Baguette could not get a full-time seat for the 2011 IndyCar Series. However, he could find a deal with Bobby Rahal's team Rahal Letterman Lanigan Racing to enter the 2011 Indianapolis 500 with the No. 30 car. After showing an impressive pace during practice, Baguette qualified on the fifth row for his second Indy 500. During the race, he was constantly positioned within the first half of the field and on lap 189, manage a pass on Danica Patrick to take the lead of the 2011 Indianapolis 500. His race engineer gambled on the race strategy by extending his time out on track, hoping for a late yellow flag that would have given the car a good chance at the win, but this didn't happen and low on fuel, Baguette had to pit three laps before the end of the race. He finished seventh, still his best result of his career in IndyCar.

=== Formula One ===
Baguette tested for Renault F1 at Jerez on 1 December 2009 and for BMW Sauber two days later. Baguette was favourite to become Robert Kubica's team mate at Renault after many favourites such as Timo Glock, Heikki Kovalainen, Romain Grosjean, Takuma Sato, Nick Heidfeld, Christian Klien and Jacques Villeneuve dropped out but the seat was eventually filled by Vitaly Petrov.

=== FIA World Endurance Championship ===
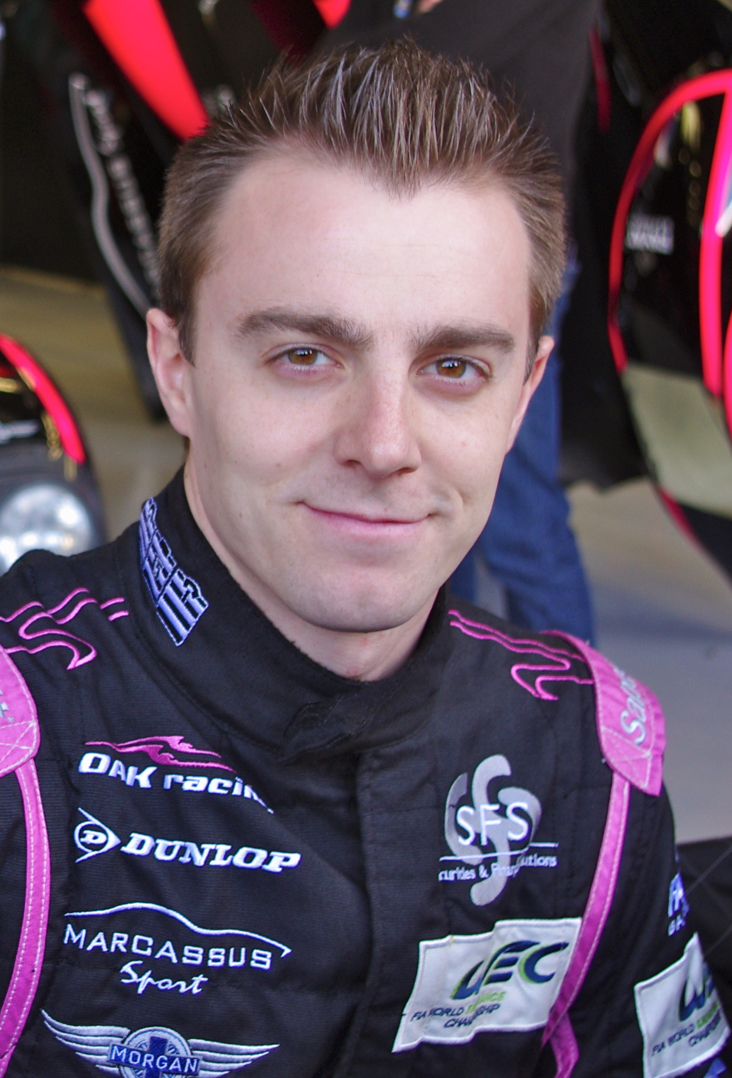
Baguette at the 2013 6 Hours of Silverstone

For 2013, Baguette was hired by OAK Racing to drive Morgan-Nissans in the LMP2 class on the FIA World Endurance Championship. Baguette shared the number 35 entry with co-drivers Ricardo González and Martin Plowman.

The 2013 season started at the 6 Hours of Silverstone, the OAK Racing Morgan LMP2-Nissan No. 35 finished in fourth place (twelfth overall) to get their first ten points for the World Championship.

On the 6 Hours of Spa-Francorchamps, González, Baguette and Plowman finished in third position (for cars registered for points in the FIA World Endurance Championship), of LMP2 class (eleventh overall).

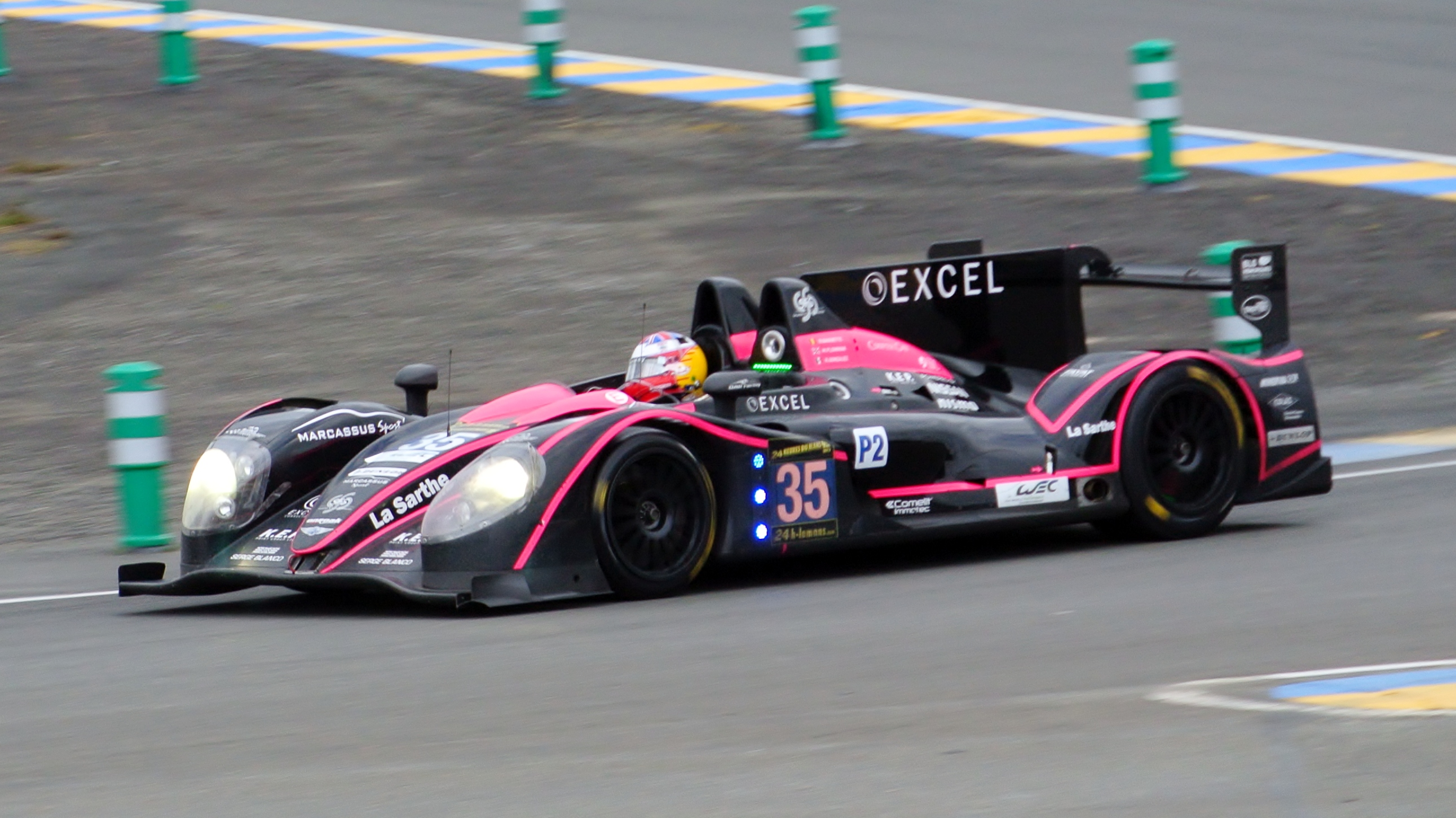
Martin Plowman, Baguette's co-driver at the 2013 24 Hours of Le Mans

In 2013, Baguette and his co-drivers Ricardo González and Martin Plowman from OAK Racing Morgan LMP2-Nissan team, won 81st edition of the 24 Hours of Le Mans in LMP2 class (seventh overall). Their Morgan LMP2 covered a total of 329 laps in the Circuit de la Sarthe, the race was run in very difficult weather conditions and several serious accidents bringing out a record of twelve safety car caution periods.

The 6 Hours of São Paulo were held at the Autódromo José Carlos Pace, on 30 August–1 September. González, Baguette and Plowman got the second place of LMP2 category, only behind Oreca 03-Nissan team (Rusinov, Martin and Conway). With this result the Belgian driver got his second podium of the year.

In the fifth round of 2013 season were the 6 Hours of Circuit of the Americas in Austin, Texas on 20–22 September, González, Baguette and Plowman obtained the seventh place of LMP2 category (eleventh overall).

On 18–20 October, in the 6 hours of Fuji, following a two-hour delay the race was restarted once more under the safety car, lapping another eight circuits before officials stopped the race again and eventually called an end to the event. The No. 35 OAK Morgan-Nissan (Baguette, González and Plowman), started in the pole position and was declared the race winner of LMP2 class (fourth overall), in the same position they started. Due to difficult weather conditions half points will be awarded for all the teams and drivers in the event.

During the 6 Hours of Shanghai on 8–9 November, the No. 35 OAK Morgan-Nissan trio (Baguette, González and Plowman), qualified in fourth position and finished in third place (7th overall). With this new podium the French team extend their lead on 15 points to the final race of the championship.

On the last race of the season the 6 Hours of Bahrain on 29–30 November, González, Baguette and Plowman qualified in sixth place and finished in fourth position (sixth overall). Therefore, Baguette won the 2013 FIA WEC World Championship for drivers and teams in LMP2 class.

=== Super GT ===
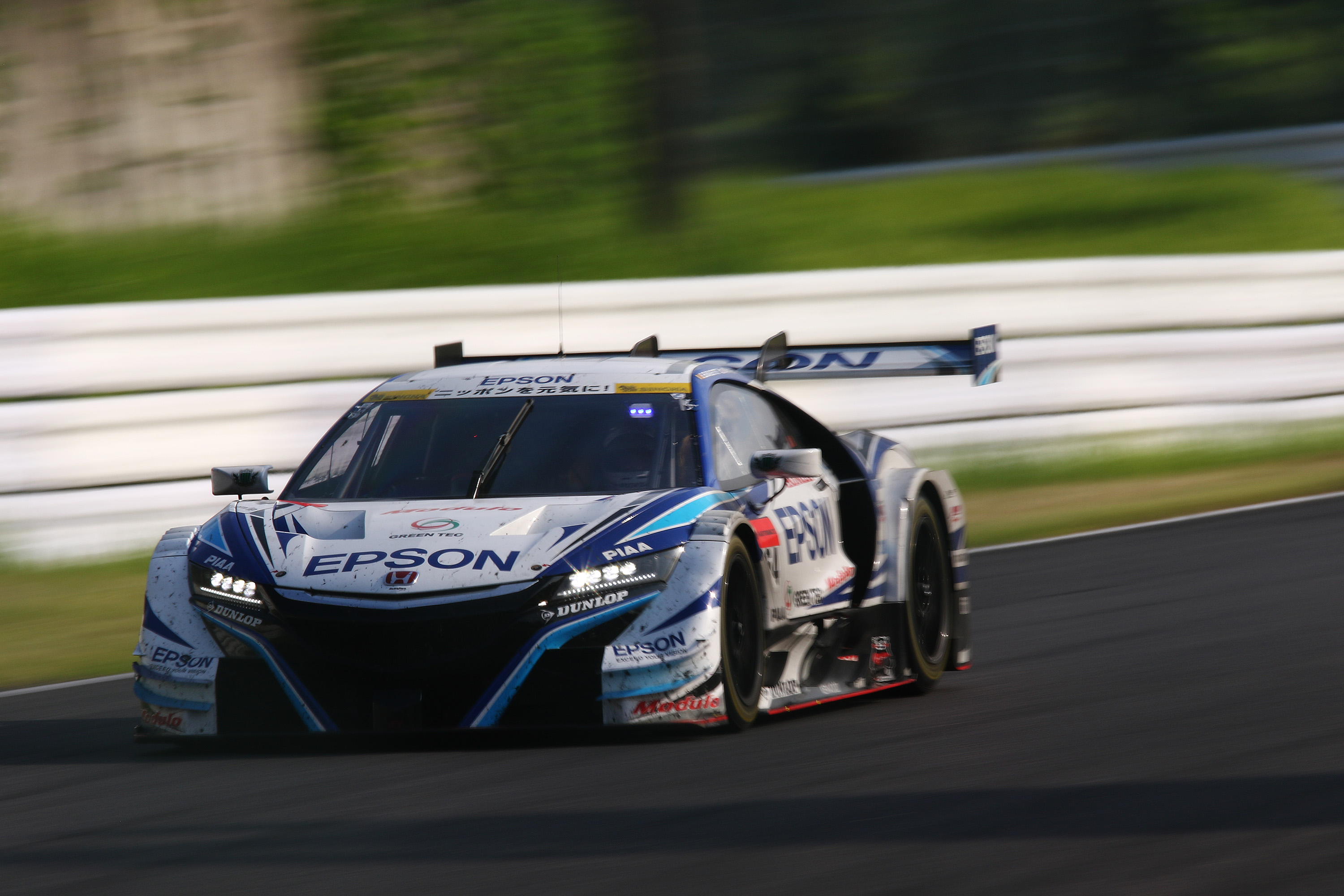
The Epson NSX-GT of Baguette at Suzuka in 2017

In 2014, Baguette became a factory driver for Honda, and began competing in the Super GT championship in Japan. Between 2014 and 2018, he drove for the Epson Nakajima Racing team in the GT500 class, alongside co-driver Daisuke Nakajima from 2014 to 2016 and then Kosuke Matsuura during the 2017 and 2018 seasons. The team's Honda NSX-GT was the only GT500 car in the series equipped with Dunlop Tyres during these seasons, which were generally lacking performance compared to rival tyre manufacturers.

During his first season in the series in 2014, Baguette scored his first Super GT podium at the fifth round in Fuji Speedway. In 2017, Baguette and Matsuura drove the Epson Nakajima Racing Honda to victory at the Suzuka 1000km, considered as the biggest race in Japan. Moreover, 2017 was the last year the race was run as a 1000 km event and part of the Super GT calendar.

For the 2019 season, Baguette was announced to drive the No. 17 Keihin Real Racing Honda NSX-GT equipped with Bridgestone tyres, partnering with Japanese driver Koudai Tsukakoshi. During the 2019 season, they scored two pole positions and one podium, but did not win a race.

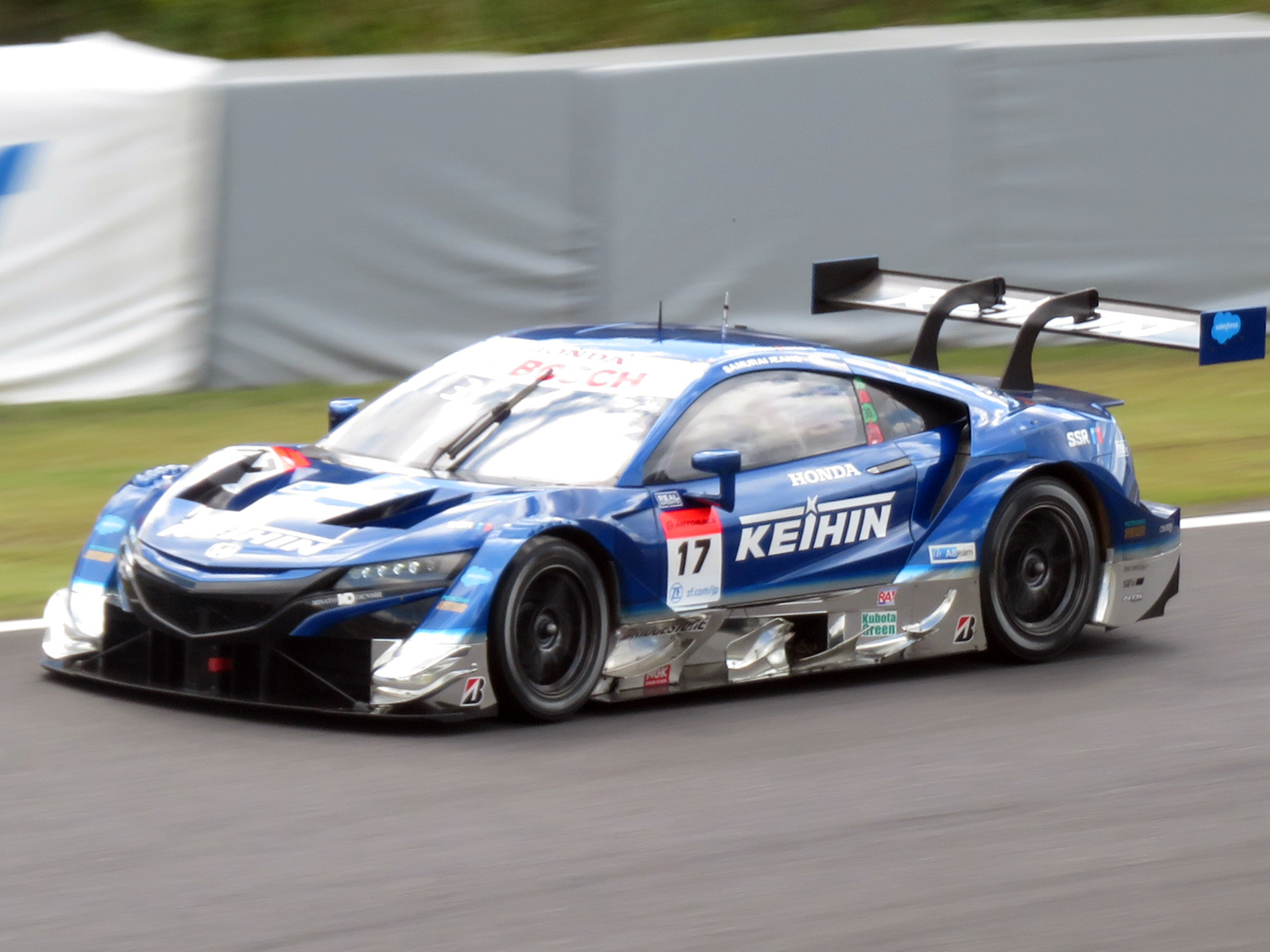
Baguette's Keihin NSX-GT in 2020

Honda kept the two drivers for the next season. After scoring the fastest overall time of the pre-season tests in Okayama in March, the season was put on hold due to the coronavirus pandemic and Baguette returned to Belgium. Eventually, the 2020 season began in July, though Baguette nearly missed the season opener due to Japan's restrictions to let foreigners enter the country, but could obtain his visa just on time for the first race. The season was the best yet for Baguette, as he and Tsukakoshi managed to score two victories – at the second round at Fuji and fourth round at Motegi – and battled the whole season for the title. Both victories saw Baguette starting the race in second position and overtake the leader on track during his stint, before Tsukakoshi finished the job by driving to the finish without mistakes. The pair were leading the championship on countback going into the final round at Fuji, where ten teams could potentially win the title. The Real Racing NSX finished the race in fourth after a great comeback from a poor qualifying in which the No. 17 car could only manage twelfth position. This result saw Baguette and Tsukakoshi finish third in the championship, ten points behind the No. 100 Team Kunimitsu NSX driven by Naoki Yamamoto and Tadasuke Makino.

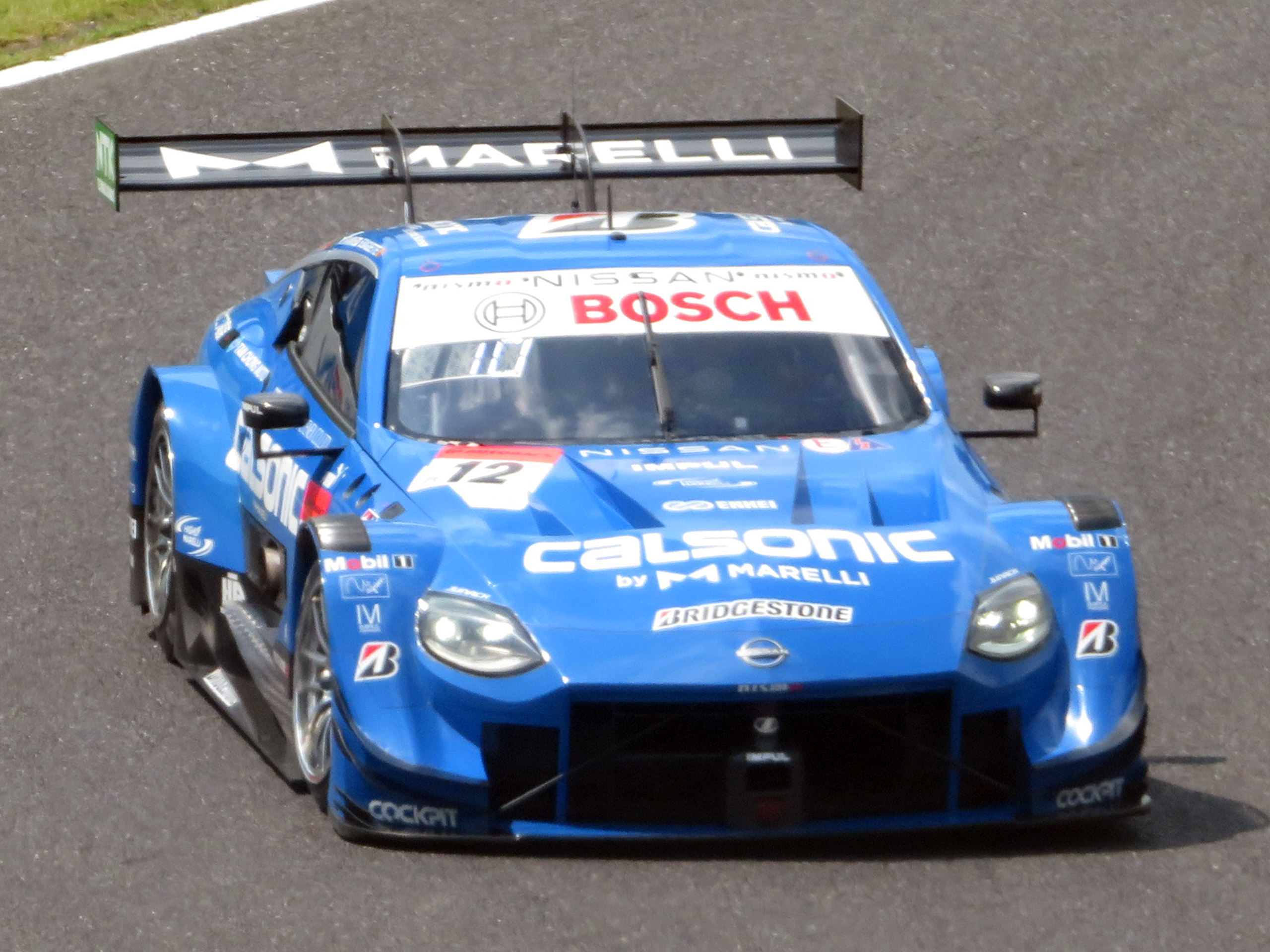
Baguette won the Calsonic Impul Z series championship in 2022

Baguette was retained at the Real Racing team for 2021, with the No. 17 Honda now sponsored by Astemo following the merger of Keihin into the company. The Belgian, still partnering Tsukakoshi, won the Fuji 500 km race, the longest of the season, after starting only eleventh. The pair also managed to score another podium in Sugo together with two further top-five finishes. They entered the final round with a chance to win the championship, eight points off the lead, but early contact ended their race and they ultimately finished sixth in the standings.

After eight years that saw him earn four victories, seven podiums and two pole positions, Baguette announced he would leave Honda at the end of the 2021 season.

For the 2022 season, Baguette was signed by Nissan to drive for the famous Team Impul run by the legendary Kazuyoshi Hoshino. This move came after Nobuharu Matsushita made the exact opposite way around, taking the vacant seat left by Baguette on the n°17 Real Racing Honda. 2022 would also see the brand new Nissan 400Z taking part in Super GT's top class. The combination of Team Impul, the new Nissan Z, Baguette and his teammate Kazuki Hiramine proved to be a great success as they managed to lead the Calsonic-liveried n°12 Nissan to the Super GT title. This crown was the first for Hoshino's legendary squad since 1995. During all season, the pair fought at the top of the field, scoring four podiums, with one of them being an incredible victory in the 5th round at Suzuka that saw Baguette and Hiramine starting deadlast on the grid, overtaking the n°17 Astema NSX for the lead with only three laps to go. Eventually, the Calsonic Z was crown champion with 70.5 points, 4.5 points ahead of the n°3 Nismo Z of Katsumasa Chiyo & Mitsunori Takaboshi. This title was the first for Bertrand Baguette after nine season competing in Super Gt GT500 class.

For the 2023 season, Nissan announced an unchanged lineup, with Baguette and Hiramine retained to defend their title, now driving the n°1 Calsonic Z.

=== Super Formula ===
Baguette competed in the high-level Japanese Super Formula championship in 2015 and 2016, alongside his programme in Super GT. He drove a Honda-powered car for Nakajima Racing, scoring a best result of fifth in the final race of the 2016 season at Suzuka.

== Racing record ==
=== Career summary ===
Season	Series	Team	Races	Wins	Poles	F/Laps	Podiums	Points	Position
2004	Formula Renault 1.6 Belgium	Marc Goossens Motorsport	14	2	4	-	6	170	**3rd**
2005	Eurocup Formula Renault 2.0	Epsilon Euskadi	16	0	0	1	0	43	7th
2005	Formula Renault 2.0 France	Epsilon Sport	15	0	0	0	1	30	11th
2006	Eurocup Formula Renault 2.0	Epsilon Euskadi	14	1	0	1	5	88	4th
2006	Formula Renault 2.0 France	Epsilon Sport	10	0	0	1	1	48	8th
2007	Formula Renault 3.5 Series	KTR	17	0	0	0	2	34	17th
2008	Formula Renault 3.5 Series	Draco Racing	17	1	0	0	1	69	7th
2008	Superleague Formula	Al Ain	4	0	0	0	0	244	12th
2008	FIA GT Championship - GT2	Easy Race S.r.l.	1	0	0	0	0	0	NC
2009	Formula Renault 3.5 Series	Draco Racing	17	5	1	2	10	155	**1st**
2010	IndyCar Series	Conquest Racing	15	0	0	0	0	213	22nd
2011	FIA GT1 World Championship	Marc VDS Racing Team	4	0	0	0	1	28	17th
2011	IndyCar Series	Rahal Letterman Lanigan Racing	1	0	0	0	0	30	39th
2012	FIA World Endurance Championship	OAK Racing	8	0	0	0	0	2	71st
2012	European Le Mans Series - LMP2	OAK Racing	2	1	0	0	2	71	**2nd**
2012	American Le Mans Series - LMP2	OAK Racing	1	0	0	0	0	N/A	NC
2012	Blancpain Endurance Series	GPR Racing	1	0	0	0	0	0	NC
2012	24 Hours of Le Mans	OAK Racing	1	0	0	0	0	N/A	DNF
2013	FIA World Endurance Championship	OAK Racing	8	2	1	1	5	141.5	**1st**
2013	24 Hours of Le Mans	OAK Racing	1	1	0	0	1	N/A	**1st**
2013	NASCAR Whelen Euro Series - Elite	Racing Club Partners	2	0	0	0	0	65	38th
2014	Super GT - GT500	Nakajima Racing	8	0	0	0	1	12	17th
2015	Super GT - GT500	Nakajima Racing	8	0	0	0	0	4	15th
2015	Super Formula	Nakajima Racing	8	0	0	0	0	0	18th
2016	Super GT - GT500	Nakajima Racing	8	0	0	0	0	7	18th
2016	Super Formula	Nakajima Racing	9	0	0	0	0	4.5	15th
2016	Blancpain GT Series Endurance Cup	Belgian Audi Club Team WRT	1	0	0	0	0	8	36th
2017	Super GT - GT500	Nakajima Racing	8	1	0	0	1	32	11th
2017	Blancpain GT Series Endurance Cup	Attempto Racing	2	0	0	0	0	0	NC
2018	Super GT - GT500	Nakajima Racing	8	0	0	0	0	4	19th
2018	Blancpain GT Series Endurance Cup - Pro-Am	Castrol Honda Racing	1	0	0	0	0	0	NC
2019	Super GT - GT500	Keihin Real Racing	8	0	2	2	1	39	6th
2019	Blancpain GT Series Endurance Cup	Team Honda Racing	1	0	0	0	0	11	28th
2019	Intercontinental GT Challenge	Honda Team Motul	4	0	1	0	0	10	25th
2020	Super GT - GT500	Keihin Real Racing	8	2	0	0	2	59	**3rd**
2020	Intercontinental GT Challenge	Team Honda Racing	1	0	1	0	0	12	15th
2021	Super GT - GT500	Astemo Real Racing	8	1	0	0	2	52	6th
2021	GT World Challenge Europe Endurance Cup - Pro-Am	Orange1 FFF Racing Team	1	0	0	0	0	0	NC
2021	Intercontinental GT Challenge	Orange1 FFF Racing Team	1	0	0	0	0	0	NC
2022	Super GT - GT500	Team Impul	8	1	0	0	4	70.5	**1st**
2023	Super GT - GT500	Team Impul	8	0	0	0	1	46	5th
2023	Porsche Carrera Cup Benelux	AUGUST by NGT	4	1	0	0	1	59	10th
2024	Super GT - GT500	Team Impul	8	0	0	1	2	47	7th
2024	Super Taikyu - ST-Z	Team Impul	1	0	0	0	0	23	NC
2025	Super GT - GT500	Team Impul	8	0	0	0	1	27.5	10th
2025	Super Taikyu - ST-Z	Team Impul	1	0	0	0	1	62.5‡	6th‡
2025	Porsche Carrera Cup Benelux	D'ieteren Luxury Performance	2	1	1	0	2	0	NC†
2025	Belcar Endurance Championship - GT Cup	D’Ieteren Luxury Performance by NGT							
2026	Super GT - GT500	Team Impul	8	1	0	0	3	57	4th
2026	Super Taikyu - ST-Z	Team Impul							
2026	Porsche Carrera Cup Benelux	NGT Racing	2	0	0	0	0	0	NC†

=== Complete Championnat de France Formula Renault 2.0 results ===
(key) (Races in bold indicate pole position; races in italics indicate fastest lap)

Year	Entrant	1	2	3	4	5	6	7	8	9	10	11	12	13	14	15	16	DC	Points
2005	Epsilon Sport Team	NOG; 1 Ret	NOG; 2; 22	LED; 1 Ret	LED; 2; 17	PAU; 1; 2	PAU; 2; 18	DIJ; 1 Ret	DIJ; 2; 16	VIE; 1; 7	VIE; 2 Ret	LEM; 1 Ret	LEM; 2; 12	ALB; 1; 6	ALB; 2; 9	MAG; 1; 8	MAG; 2; 7	11th	30
2006	Epsilon Sport Team	NOG; 1 Ret	NOG; 2; 15	DIJ; 1; 4	DIJ; 2; 3	PAU; 1; 7	PAU; 2; 10	VIE; 1; 4	VIE; 2; 11	ALB; 1	ALB; 2	LEM; NC	MAG; 1; 5	MAG; 2; 4				8th	48

=== Complete Eurocup Formula Renault 2.0 results ===
(key) (Races in bold indicate pole position; races in italics indicate fastest lap)

Year	Entrant	1	2	3	4	5	6	7	8	9	10	11	12	13	14	15	16	DC	Points
2005	Epsilon Euskadi	ZOL; 1; 6	ZOL; 2; 18	VAL; 1; 5	VAL; 2; 10	LMS; 1; 7	LMS; 2; 21	BIL; 1 DSQ	BIL; 2; 4	OSC; 1; 7	OSC; 2; 12	DON; 1 Ret	DON; 2; 5	EST; 1; 15	EST; 2; 9	MNZ; 1; 23	MNZ; 2; 5	8th	43
2006	Epsilon Euskadi	ZOL; 1; 3	ZOL; 2; 2	IST; 1; 13	IST; 2; 11	MIS; 1; 9	MIS; 2; 8	NÜR; 1; 23	NÜR; 2; 30	DON; 1; 2	DON; 2; 3	LMS; 1; 1	LMS; 2; 6	CAT; 1; 4	CAT; 2; 5			4th	88

=== Complete Formula Renault 3.5 Series results ===
(key) (Races in bold indicate pole position) (Races in italics indicate fastest lap)

Year	Entrant	1	2	3	4	5	6	7	8	9	10	11	12	13	14	15	16	17	DC	Points
2007	KTR	MNZ; 1; 18	MNZ; 2 Ret	NÜR; 1; 11	NÜR; 2 Ret	MON; 1; 12	HUN; 1 Ret	HUN; 2; 17	SPA; 1; 5	SPA; 2 Ret	DON; 1; 3	DON; 2 Ret	MAG; 1 Ret	MAG; 2; 13	EST; 1; 20	EST; 2 Ret	CAT; 1; 8	CAT; 2; 2	17th	34
2008	Draco Racing	MNZ; 1 Ret	MNZ; 2 Ret	SPA; 1; 1	SPA; 2; 11	MON; 1; 5	SIL; 1; 6	SIL; 2; 16	HUN; 1; 4	HUN; 2; 4	NÜR; 1; 5	NÜR; 2; 5	BUG; 1 Ret	BUG; 2; 16	EST; 1 Ret	EST; 2; 4	CAT; 1 Ret	CAT; 2; 4	7th	69
2009	Draco Racing	CAT; 1; 2	CAT; 2 Ret	SPA; 1; 2	**SPA**; **2**; 2	MON; 1; 5	HUN; 1; 3	HUN; 2; 6	**SIL**; **1**; 8	SIL; 2; 5	BUG; 1; 1	BUG; 2; 1	ALG; 1; 2	ALG; 2; 5	NÜR; 1; 1	NÜR; 2; 5	ALC; 1; 1	ALC; 2; 1	1st	155

=== Superleague Formula ===
(Races in bold indicate pole position) (Races in italics indicate fastest lap)

Year	Team	Operator	1	2	3		4	5	6		Position	Points
2008	Al Ain	Azerti Motorsport	DON	NÜR	ZOL		EST	VAL	JER		12th	244
2008	Al Ain	Azerti Motorsport			11	10			10	7	12th	244

=== IndyCar Series results ===
(key)

Year	Team	No.	Chassis	Engine	1	2	3	4	5	6	7	8	9	10	11	12	13	14	15	16	17	18	Rank	Points	Ref
2010	Conquest Racing	36	Dallara IR-05	Honda	SAO	STP	ALA; 20	LBH; 24	KAN; 20	INDY; 22	TXS; 22	IOW; 17	WGL; 18	TOR; 16	EDM; 14	MDO; 11							22nd	213	
2010	Conquest Racing	34	Dallara IR-05	Honda													SNM; 23	CHI; 12	KTY; 10	MOT; 25	HMS; 15		22nd	213	
2011	Rahal Letterman Lanigan Racing	30	Dallara IR-05	Honda	STP	ALA	LBH	SAO	INDY; 7	TXS	TXS	MIL	IOW	TOR	EDM	MDO	NHM	SNM	BAL	MOT	KTY	LVS	39th	30	

Years	Teams	Races	Poles	Wins	Podiums (Non-win)	Top 10s (Non-podium)	Indianapolis 500 Wins	Championships
2	2	16	0	0	0	2	0	0

==== Indianapolis 500 ====
Year	Chassis	Engine	Start	Finish	Team
2010	Dallara	Honda	24	22	Conquest Racing
2011	Dallara	Honda	14	7	RLL Racing

=== Complete GT1 World Championship results ===
Year	Team	Car	1	2	3	4	5	6	7	8	9	10	11	12	13	14	15	16	17	18	19	20	Pos	Points
2011	Marc VDS Racing Team	Ford GT1	ABU; QR	ABU; CR	ZOL; QR	ZOL; CR	ALG; QR	ALG; CR	SAC; QR	SAC; CR	SIL; QR	SIL; CR	NAV; QR; 3	NAV; CR; 4	PRI; QR	PRI; CR	ORD; QR	ORD; CR	BEI; QR; Ret	BEI; CR; 4	SAN; QR	SAN; CR	17th	28

=== Complete European Le Mans Series results ===
Year	Team	Class	Car	Engine	1	2	3	Rank	Points
2012	OAK Racing	LMP2	Morgan LMP2	Nissan VK45DE 4.5 L V8	CAS	DON; 1	ATL; 2	2nd	71

=== 24 Hours of Le Mans results ===
Year	Team	Co-Drivers	Car	Class	Laps	Pos.	Class Pos.
2012	(France) OAK Racing	(France) Franck Montagny (Austria) Dominik Kraihamer	OAK Pescarolo 01 Evo-Judd	LMP1	219	DNF	DNF
2013	(France) OAK Racing	(United Kingdom) Martin Plowman (Mexico) Ricardo González	OAK Morgan LMP2 Nissan	LMP2	329	7th	**1st**

=== Complete FIA World Endurance Championship results ===
Year	Team	Class	Car	Engine	1	2	3	4	5	6	7	8	Rank	Points
2012	OAK Racing	LMP1	OAK Pescarolo 01	Judd DB 3.4 L V8	SEB; 25	SPA; Ret	LMS; Ret						71st	2
2012	OAK Racing	LMP2	Morgan LMP2	Nissan VK45DE 4.5 L V8				SIL; 14	SÃO; Ret	BHR; Ret			71st	2
2012	OAK Racing	LMP1	OAK Pescarolo 01	Honda LM-V8 3.4 L V8							FUJ; 16	SHA; 14	71st	2
2013	OAK Racing	LMP2	Morgan LMP2	Nissan VK45DE 4.5 L V8	SIL; 4	SPA; 3	LMS; 1	SÃO; 2	COA; 7	**FUJ**; 1	SHA; 3	BHR; 4	1st	141.5

=== Complete Super GT results ===
(key) (Races in bold indicate pole position) (Races in italics indicate fastest lap)

Year	Team	Car	Class	1	2	3	4	5	6	7	8	9	DC	Points
2014	Nakajima Racing	Honda NSX Concept-GT	GT500	OKA; 15	FUJ; Ret	AUT; 10	SUG; 13	FUJ; 3	SUZ; 12	BUR; Ret	MOT; 14		17th	12
2015	Nakajima Racing	Honda NSX Concept-GT	GT500	OKA; Ret	FUJ; 12	CHA; 11	FUJ; 11	SUZ; 9	SUG; Ret	AUT; 10	MOT; 13		15th	4
2016	Nakajima Racing	Honda NSX Concept-GT	GT500	OKA; 14	FUJ; 10	SUG; 12	FUJ; 11	SUZ; 11	CHA; 5	MOT; 13	MOT; 14		18th	7
2017	Nakajima Racing	Honda NSX-GT	GT500	OKA; 12	FUJ; 13	AUT; 12	SUG; 8	FUJ; 12	SUZ; 1	CHA; 8	MOT; 10		11th	32
2018	Epson Nakajima Racing	Honda NSX-GT	GT500	OKA; 15	FUJ; Ret	SUZ; 10	CHA; 9	FUJ; 13	SUG; 13	AUT; 10	MOT; 12		19th	4
2019	Keihin Real Racing	Honda NSX-GT	GT500	OKA; 14	FUJ; 5	SUZ; Ret	CHA; 13	FUJ; 8	**AUT**; 2	**SUG**; 5	MOT; 5		6th	39
2020	Keihin Real Racing	Honda NSX-GT	GT500	FUJ; Ret	FUJ; 1	SUZ; 8	MOT; 1	FUJ; 10	SUZ; 10	MOT; 5	FUJ; 4		3rd	59
2021	Astemo Real Racing	Honda NSX-GT	GT500	OKA; 5	FUJ; 1	MOT; 14	SUZ; 7	SUG; 3	AUT; 8	MOT; 4	FUJ; Ret		6th	52
2022	Team Impul	Nissan Z NISMO GT500	GT500	OKA; 7	FUJ; 3‡	SUZ; Ret	FUJ; 2	SUZ; 1	SUG; 5	AUT; 6	MOT; 2		1st	70.5
2023	Team Impul	Nissan Z NISMO GT500	GT500	OKA; 6	FUJ; 9	SUZ; 3	FUJ; 15	SUZ; 5	SUG; 4	AUT; 5	MOT; 4		5th	46
2024	Team Impul	Nissan Z NISMO GT500	GT500	OKA; 11	FUJ; 6	SUZ; 4	FUJ; 5	SUG; 3	AUT; 5	MOT; 11	SUZ; 3		6th	47
2025	Team Impul	Nissan Z NISMO GT500	GT500	OKA; Ret	FUJ; 4	SEP; 3	FS1; 6	FS2 (5)	SUZ; 8	SUG; 14	AUT; 11	MOT; DSQ	10th	27.5
2026	Team Impul	Nissan Z NISMO GT500	GT500	OKA; 3	FUJ; 7	FUJ; 12	SUZ; 6	SUG; Ret	AUT; 5	MOT; 1	MOT; 3		4th	57

^{‡} Half points awarded as less than 75% of race distance was completed.
^{(Number)} Driver did not take part in this sprint race, points are still awarded for the teammate's result.

=== Complete Super Formula results ===
(key) (Races in bold indicate pole position) (Races in italics indicate fastest lap)

Year	Team	Engine	1	2	3	4	5	6	7	8	9	DC	Points
2015	Nakajima Racing	Honda	SUZ; 10	OKA; 11	FUJ; Ret	MOT; 15	AUT; 16	SUG; 18	SUZ; 11	SUZ; Ret		18th	0
2016	Nakajima Racing	Honda	SUZ; 8	OKA; 14	FUJ; 14	MOT; Ret	OKA; 14	OKA; 18	SUG; 9	SUZ; 6	SUZ; 5	15th	4.5

=== Complete Porsche Carrera Cup Benelux results ===
(key) (Races in bold indicate pole position) (Races in italics indicate fastest lap)

Year	Team	1	2	3	4	5	6	7	8	9	10	11	12	DC	Points
2023	AUGUST by NGT	SPA; 1	SPA; 2	HOC; 1; 6	HOC; 2; 5	ZAN; 1	ZAN; 2	ASS; 1	ASS; 2	ZOL; 1; 4	ZOL; 2; 1	RBR; 1	RBR; 2	10th	59
2025	D'Ieteren Luxury Performance	SPA; 1; 3	**SPA**; **2**; 1	ZAN; 1	ZAN; 2	HUN; 1	HUN; 2	ASS; 1	ASS; 2	ZOL; 1	ZOL; 2	ZAN; 1	ZAN; 2	NC	0

=== 24 Hours of Spa results ===
Year	Team	Co-Drivers	Car	Class	Laps	Pos.	Class Pos.
2008	(Italy) Easy Race SRL	(Italy) Maurice Basso (Italy) Paolo Tenchini (Italy) Roberto Plati	Ferrari F430 GT2	GT2	350	DNF	DNF
2012	(Belgium) GPR AMR	(Belgium) Ronnie Lattine (Belgium) Tim Verbergt (Belgium) Damien Dupont	Aston Martin V12 Vantage GT3	GT3 Pro-Am	477	16th	10th
2013	(Belgium) GPR AMR	(United Kingdom) Darren Turner (United Kingdom) Jamie Campbell-Walter	Aston Martin V12 Vantage GT3	Pro Cup	82	DNF	DNF
2016	(Belgium) Belgian Audi Club Team WRT	(Belgium) Adrien de Leener (Germany) Pierre Kaffer	Audi R8 LMS	Pro Cup	527	8th	8th
2018	(Italy) Castrol Honda Racing	(France) Loïc Depailler (Argentina) Esteban Guerrieri (Italy) Riccardo Patrese	Honda NSX GT3	Pro-Am	490	32nd	8th
2019	(Italy) Honda Team Motul	(Netherlands) Renger van der Zande (Germany) Mario Farnbacher	Honda NSX GT3	Pro Cup	362	6th	6th
2021	(China) Orange 1 FFF Racing Team	(Italy) Stefano Costantini (Japan) Hiroshi Hamaguchi (United Kingdom) Phil Keen	Lamborghini Huracán GT3 Evo	Pro-Am	180	DNF	DNF

=== 24 Hours of Zolder results ===
Year	Team	Co-Drivers	Car	Class	Laps	Pos.	Class Pos.
2005	(Belgium) Speedlover	(Belgium) Stéphanie Boden (Netherlands) Jean-Pierre Verhoeven	Porsche 996 GT3 Cup	GTB		DNF	DNF
2024	(Belgium) D'Ieteren Luxury Performance by NGT	(Belgium) Benjamin Paque (Belgium) Kobe Pauwels (Belgium) Glenn Van Parijs (Sweden) Robin Knutsson	Porsche 992 GT3 Cup	GTA	787	1st	1st
2025	(Belgium) D'Ieteren Luxury Performance by NGT	(Sweden) Robin Knutsson (Belgium) Glenn Van Parijs (Belgium) Laurens Vanthoor (Belgium) Cédric Wauters	Porsche 992 GT3 Cup	GT Cup	818	2nd	2nd
2026	(Belgium) D’Ieteren Luxury Performance by NGT	(United Kingdom) Jonny Edgar (Belgium) Laurens Vanthoor (Belgium) Glenn Van Parijs (Belgium) Tom Van Rompuy	Porsche 992 GT3 Cup	GT Cup	778	**1st**	**1st**

Sporting positions
Preceded by Giedo van der Garde	Formula Renault 3.5 Series; Champion; 2009	Succeeded by Mikhail Aleshin
Preceded by Inaugural	FIA Endurance Trophy for LMP2 Drivers; 2013; With: Martin Plowman & Ricardo González	Succeeded by Sergey Zlobin
Preceded by Sho Tsuboi; Yuhi Sekiguchi	Super GT; GT500 Champion; 2022; With: Kazuki Hiramine	Succeeded by Sho Tsuboi; Ritomo Miyata
