= 2005 Championnat de France Formula Renault 2.0 =

Motor racing competition

Seasons
- ← 2004 2006 →

The 2005 Championnat de France Formula Renault 2.0 was held in France.

== Drivers and Teams ==
Team	No.	Driver	Rounds
(France) Graff Racing	1	(France) Laurent Groppi	All
(France) Graff Racing	2	(France) Ulric Amado	All
(France) Graff Racing	3	(France) Nicolas Prost	All
(France) Graff Racing	6	(France) Nicolas Navarro	All
(France) Graff Racing	7	(France) Jacky Ferré	All
(France) Graff Racing	9	(France) Julien Canal	All
(United Kingdom) Comtec Racing	4	(United Kingdom) Westley Barber	1–6
(United Kingdom) Comtec Racing	5	(United Kingdom) Pippa Mann	1–3, 5–6, 8
(France) Tech 1 Racing	8	(France) Simon Pagenaud	3
(France) Tech 1 Racing	30	(France) Damien Claverie	1–5, 7–8
(France) Tech 1 Racing	31	(United Kingdom) Phil Glew	1
(France) Tech 1 Racing	33	(Argentina) Ivo Perabó	1
(France) Tech 1 Racing	35	(Argentina) Ezequiel Bosio	1
(France) SG Formula	10	(France) Romain Grosjean	All
(France) SG Formula	11	(France) Johan Charpilienne	All
(France) SG Formula	12	(France) Franck Mailleux	All
(France) SG Formula	14	(France) Julien Jousse	All
(France) Pole Services	15	(France) Adrien Paviot	All
(France) Pole Services	16	(France) Thomas Accary	All
(France) Pole Services	17	(France) Stéphanie Tesson	All
(France) Pole Services	36	(France) Philippe Bénoliel	2
(France) Pole Services	41	(France) Thomas Bouché	8
(France) SCF Compétition	18	(France) Stéphane Freve	All
(France) MC Racing	19	(France) Kevin Cozic	1–6
(France) MC Racing	21	(France) Thomas Mich	1–2, 4
(France) MC Racing	23	(France) Bruce Lorgeré-Roux	All
(France) MC Racing	37	(France) Tom Dillmann	4, 7–8
(France) RBA Sport	20	(France) Rodolphe Hauchard	All
(France) Hexis Racing	22	(France) Mathieu Santi	All
(France) Hexis Racing	24	(France) Florian Boukobza	1–6
(France) Hexis Racing	29	(France) Malo Olivier	All
(France) Hexis Racing	39	(France) Julien Falcini-Joulian	7–8
(France) Epsilon Sport Team	25	(France) Pierre Ragues	1–6, 8
(France) Epsilon Sport Team	26	(France) Nelson Panciatici	All
(France) Epsilon Sport Team	34	(Belgium) Bertrand Baguette	All
(France) Racing Team Trajectoire	27	(France) Sylvain Milesi	1–2, 4–5, 7–8
(France) Lycée D'Artagnan	32	(France) Daniel Harout	1, 5
(France) TP Competition	38	(France) Pierre Macé	6
(France) Pouchelon Racing	40	(France) Adrien Pouchelon	7
(France) Energy Racing	58	(France) Johan-Boris Scheier	1–5

== Race calendar and results ==
Round		Circuit	Date	Pole position	Fastest lap	Winning driver	Winning team
1	1	(France) Circuit Paul Armagnac	March 27	(France) Romain Grosjean	(France) Laurent Groppi	(France) Laurent Groppi	(France) Graff Racing
1	2	(France) Circuit Paul Armagnac	March 28	(United Kingdom) Westley Barber	(France) Ulric Amado	(United Kingdom) Westley Barber	(United Kingdom) Comtec Racing
2	3	(France) Circuit de Lédenon	April 16	(France) Ulric Amado	(France) Malo Olivier	(France) Ulric Amado	(France) Graff Racing
2	4	(France) Circuit de Lédenon	April 17	(France) Ulric Amado	(France) Romain Grosjean	(France) Franck Mailleux	(France) SG Formula
3	5	(France) Pau Grand Prix	May 7	(France) Romain Grosjean	(France) Romain Grosjean	(France) Romain Grosjean	(France) SG Formula
3	6	(France) Pau Grand Prix	May 8	(France) Romain Grosjean	(France) Romain Grosjean	(France) Romain Grosjean	(France) SG Formula
4	7	(France) Dijon-Prenois	May 28	(France) Romain Grosjean	(France) Romain Grosjean	(France) Romain Grosjean	(France) SG Formula
4	8	(France) Dijon-Prenois	May 29	(France) Romain Grosjean	(France) Romain Grosjean	(France) Romain Grosjean	(France) SG Formula
5	9	(France) Circuit du Val de Vienne	June 25	(France) Laurent Groppi	(France) Johan Charpilienne	(France) Johan Charpilienne	(France) SG Formula
5	10	(France) Circuit du Val de Vienne	June 26	(France) Romain Grosjean	(France) Romain Grosjean	(France) Romain Grosjean	(France) SG Formula
6	11	(France) Circuit de la Sarthe	July 9	(France) Romain Grosjean	(France) Romain Grosjean	(France) Romain Grosjean	(France) SG Formula
6	12	(France) Circuit de la Sarthe	July 10	(France) Laurent Groppi	(France) Romain Grosjean	(France) Romain Grosjean	(France) SG Formula
7	13	(France) Circuit d'Albi	September 3	(France) Romain Grosjean	(France) Romain Grosjean	(France) Romain Grosjean	(France) SG Formula
7	14	(France) Circuit d'Albi	September 4	(France) Romain Grosjean	(France) Romain Grosjean	(France) Romain Grosjean	(France) SG Formula
8	15	(France) Circuit de Nevers Magny-Cours	October 15	(France) Romain Grosjean	(France) Romain Grosjean	(France) Romain Grosjean	(France) SG Formula
8	16	(France) Circuit de Nevers Magny-Cours	October 16	(France) Julien Jousse	(France) Laurent Groppi	(France) Julien Jousse	(France) SG Formula

== Results and standings ==
Race point system
Position	1st	2nd	3rd	4th	5th	6th	7th	8th	9th	10th
Points	15	12	10	8	6	5	4	3	2	1

- In each race 1 point for Fastest lap and 1 for Pole position. In each race 1 point for Fastest lap and 1 for Pole position.

=== Drivers ===
Pos	Driver	(France) NOG		(France) LED		(France) PAU		(France) DIJ		(France) VIE		(France) LEM		(France) ALB		(France) MAG		Points
Pos	Driver	1	2	3	4	5	6	7	8	9	10	11	12	13	14	15	16	Points
1	(France) Romain Grosjean	2	3	Ret	5	1	1	1	1	DSQ	1	1	1	1	1	1	2	211
2	(France) Laurent Groppi	1	2	6	3	3	2	2	2	Ret	3	2	2	2	3	2	3	170
3	(France) Ulric Amado	4	6	1	2	4	Ret	3	3	3	4	4	3	5	8	7	6	124
4	(France) Johan Charpilienne	3	5	4	4	21	3	Ret	5	1	5	7	7	17	7	3	4	100
5	(France) Franck Mailleux	6	29	2	1	6	Ret	8	9	8	8	5	5	8	5	5	5	81
6	(France) Julien Jousse	DNS	4	Ret	14	7	Ret	4	23	9	15	6	6	3	2	Ret	1	70
7	(France) Malo Olivier	11	8	7	Ret	8	5	6	8	2	2	13	Ret	4	4	10	10	67
8	(United Kingdom) Westley Barber	5	1	13	12	9	Ret	3	4	6	6	3	4					52
9	(France) Nicolas Navarro (R)	13	13	12	10	12	9	7	4	4	13	8	Ret	10	10	6	8	36
10	(France) Nicolas Prost	7	DNS	11	11	5	4	5	22	5	9	18	Ret	18	13	13	19	32
11	(Belgium) Bertrand Baguette (R)	Ret	22	Ret	17	2	18	Ret	16	7	Ret	Ret	12	6	9	8	7	30
12	(France) Jacky Ferré (R)	Ret	10	3	8	Ret	10	9	7	10	7	14	8	DNS	11	Ret	20	29
13	(France) Nelson Panciatici (R)	10	9	15	23	10	11	23	6	13	10	12	Ret	7	6	17	11	19
14	(France) Julien Canal	9	11			Ret	6					11	11			4	9	17
15	(France) Pierre Ragues	8	12	9	6	14	8	13	10	14	17	10	13			9	14	17
16	(France) Damien Claverie	Ret	7	14	18	Ret	7	17	13	19	14			11	14	11	Ret	8
17	(France) Bruce Lorgeré-Roux	16	Ret	8	7	15	13	10	12	15	19	15	Ret	19	18	Ret	13	8
18	(France) Thomas Accary (R)	Ret	14	10	9	22	20	18	Ret	11	11	9	9	20	Ret	14	Ret	7
19	(France) Johan-Boris Scheier	12	Ret	5	Ret	13	12	11	15	18	DNS							6
20	(France) Adrien Paviot (R)	DNS	15	17	Ret	19	14	12	11	16	Ret	23	14	9	Ret	Ret	Ret	2
21	(United Kingdom) Pippa Mann	18	Ret	24	22	Ret	17			Ret	21	19	10			19	17	1
22	(France) Stéphane Freve (R)	Ret	18	20	13	17	16	14	Ret	12	16	16	Ret	13	12	18	22	0
23	(France) Stéphanie Tesson	15	25	21	15	16	Ret	16	21	17	12	20	Ret	14	15	16	18	0
24	(France) Rodolphe Hauchard	Ret	23	19	19	Ret	21	21	18	23	23	22	16	DNS	19	21	21	0
25	(France) Mathieu Santi (R)	Ret	26	18	Ret	20	19	DNS	DNS	Ret	24	21	18	16	20	Ret	24	0
26	(France) Florian Boukobza (R)	DNS	16	16	Ret	18	15	15	14	Ret	18	17	15					0
27	(France) Sylvain Milesi	22	17	22	16			19	17	22	20			Ret	17	20	23	0
28	(France) Kevin Cozic (R)	21	27	Ret	21	Ret	22	20	19	21	Ret	Ret	17					0
29	(France) Thomas Mich (R)	20	19	25	24			22	20									0
30	(France) Tom Dillmann (R)							Ret	DNS					15	Ret	15	12	0
31	(France) Daniel Harout	14	21							20	22							0
32	(Argentina) Ivo Perabó (R)	19	20															0
33	(Argentina) Ezequiel Bosio (R)	17	28															0
34	(France) Philippe Bénoliel			23	20													0
35	(United Kingdom) Phil Glew	DNS	24															0
Guest drivers ineligible for points.
	(France) Simon Pagenaud					11	DNS											
	(France) Julien Falcini-Joulian													12	16	12	16	
	(France) Thomas Bouché															22	15	
	(France) Adrien Pouchelon													Ret	21			
	(France) Pierre Macé											Ret	Ret					
