= 2006 Championnat de France Formula Renault 2.0 =

Motor racing competition

Seasons
- ← 2005 2007 →

The 2006 Championnat de France Formula Renault 2.0 was held over 13 races at seven venues. Laurent Groppi was the champion for Graff Racing.

== Teams and drivers ==
| Team | No. | Driver | Rounds |
|---|---|---|---|
| (France) Graff Racing | 1 | (France) Laurent Groppi | All |
| (France) Graff Racing | 6 | (France) Julien Canal | All |
| (France) Graff Racing | 10 | (France) Mathieu Arzeno | 1–6 |
| (France) Graff Racing | 11 | (France) Kévin Van Heek | 1–2, 4–7 |
| (France) Graff Racing | 12 | (France) Eric Bergerot | All |
| (France) Graff Racing | 94 | (France) Jean-Philippe Bournot | All |
| (France) SG Formula | 2 | (France) Julien Jousse | All |
| (France) SG Formula | 3 | (France) Jean-Karl Vernay | All |
| (France) SG Formula | 5 | (France) Nicolas Navarro | 1–4 |
| (France) SG Formula | 8 | (France) Michaël Rossi | 5, 7 |
| (France) SG Formula | 28 | (Switzerland) Jonathan Hirschi | 4, 7 |
| (France) SG Formula | 29 | (France) Tom Dillmann | 1–3, 6–7 |
| (France) SG Formula | 30 | (Netherlands) Carlo van Dam | 1, 3, 6–7 |
| (France) Pole Services | 4 | (France) Johan Charpilienne | All |
| (France) Pole Services | 9 | (France) Sébastien Chardonnet | 4–7 |
| (France) Pole Services | 10 | (France) Mathieu Arzeno | 7 |
| (France) Pole Services | 20 | (France) Guilhem Verdier | All |
| (France) Pole Services | 21 | (France) Thomas Accary | 1–5 |
| (France) Pole Services | 22 | (France) Benjamin Rouget | 1–3 |
| (France) Pole Services | 33 | (France) Christophe Lefranc | 4 |
| (France) Pole Services | 42 | (France) Pierre Combot | 6 |
| (France) MC Racing | 5 | (France) Nicolas Navarro | 6–7 |
| (France) MC Racing | 16 | (France) Damien Claverie | 1–3, 5 |
| (France) MC Racing | 17 | (France) Stéphanie Tesson | 1–4, 7 |
| (France) MC Racing | 18 | (France) Mathieu Santi | 1–4 |
| (France) MC Racing | 19 | (United Kingdom) Adam Perkins | 1–4, 6 |
| (France) MC Racing | 39 | (France) Ulric Amado | 5–7 |
| (France) Hexis Racing | 7 | (France) Malo Olivier | All |
| (France) Hexis Racing | 8 | (France) Michaël Rossi | 1–4 |
| (France) Hexis Racing | 9 | (France) Sébastien Chardonnet | 1–3 |
| (France) Hexis Racing | 27 | (France) Sylvain Milesi | 5, 7 |
| (France) Hexis Racing | 40 | (France) Pierre-Brice Ména | 5–7 |
| (France) Hexis Racing | 77 | (France) Claude Monteiro | 6 |
| (France) Epsilon Sport Team | 14 | (France) Nelson Panciatici | All |
| (France) Epsilon Sport Team | 15 | (France) Alexandre Marsoin | All |
| (France) Epsilon Sport Team | 26 | (Bahrain) Salman Al Khalifa | 1–4, 6–7 |
| (France) Epsilon Sport Team | 34 | (Belgium) Bertrand Baguette | 1–4, 6–7 |
| (France) SCF Compétition | 23 | (France) Stéphane Freve | 1–4, 6 |
| (Switzerland) N M R T | 24 | (Switzerland) Nicolas Maulini | 1–3, 6–7 |
| (France) Racing Team Trajectoire | 27 | (France) Sylvain Milesi | 1, 4 |
| (France) RBA Sport | 31 | (France) Rodolphe Hauchard | 1–3, 5, 7 |
| (France) RBA Sport | 38 | (France) Hugues Chabaud | 5–6 |
| (France) RBA Sport | 72 | (France) Jérôme Sornicle | 6 |
| (France) Lycée Pro Nogaro | 32 | (France) Daniel Harout | 1 |
| (United Kingdom) Manor Motorsport | 35 | (France) Franck Mailleux | 2, 6 |
| (United Kingdom) Manor Motorsport | 36 | (Finland) Valle Mäkelä | 2 |
| (United Kingdom) Manor Motorsport | 37 | (China) Cong Fu Cheng | 2 |
| (Romania) Petrom District Racing AP | 49 | (Romania) Mihai Marinescu | 6–7 |
| (Switzerland) Jenzer Motorsport | 68 | (Switzerland) Fabien Thuner | 7 |
| (Switzerland) Jenzer Motorsport | 69 | (Switzerland) Didier Josseron | 7 |

== Race calendar and results ==
| Round | | Circuit | Date | Pole position | Fastest lap | Winning driver | Winning team |
|---|---|---|---|---|---|---|---|
| 1 | 1 | (France) Circuit Nogaro | April 16 | (France) Johan Charpilienne | (France) Johan Charpilienne | (France) Johan Charpilienne | (France) Pole Services |
| 1 | 2 | (France) Circuit Nogaro | April 17 | (Netherlands) Carlo van Dam | (France) Jean-Karl Vernay | (France) Laurent Groppi | (France) Graff Racing |
| 2 | 3 | (France) Dijon-Prenois | May 20 | (France) Jean-Karl Vernay | (Bahrain) Salman Al Khalifa | (France) Jean-Karl Vernay | (France) SG Formula |
| 2 | 4 | (France) Dijon-Prenois | May 21 | (France) Julien Jousse | (France) Julien Jousse | (France) Julien Jousse | (France) SG Formula |
| 3 | 5 | (France) Pau Grand Prix | June 4 | (France) Jean-Karl Vernay | (France) Laurent Groppi | (France) Laurent Groppi | (France) Graff Racing |
| 3 | 6 | (France) Pau Grand Prix | June 5 | (France) Laurent Groppi | (France) Julien Jousse | (France) Laurent Groppi | (France) Graff Racing |
| 4 | 7 | (France) Circuit du Val de Vienne | June 24 | (France) Laurent Groppi | (France) Johan Charpilienne | (France) Laurent Groppi | (France) Graff Racing |
| 4 | 8 | (France) Circuit du Val de Vienne | June 25 | (France) Laurent Groppi | (France) Laurent Groppi | (France) Laurent Groppi | (France) Graff Racing |
| 5 | 9 | (France) Circuit d'Albi | October 14 | (France) Jean-Karl Vernay | (France) Laurent Groppi | (France) Laurent Groppi | (France) Graff Racing |
| 5 | 10 | (France) Circuit d'Albi | October 15 | (France) Nelson Panciatici | (France) Nelson Panciatici | (France) Nelson Panciatici | (France) Epsilon Sport Team |
| 6 | 11 | (France) Le Mans Bugatti Circuit | October 1 | (France) Johan Charpilienne | (Belgium) Bertrand Baguette | (France) Tom Dillmann | (France) SG Formula |
| 7 | 12 | (France) Circuit de Nevers Magny-Cours | October 21 | (France) Tom Dillmann | (France) Jean-Karl Vernay | (France) Tom Dillmann | (France) SG Formula |
| 7 | 13 | (France) Circuit de Nevers Magny-Cours | October 22 | (France) Julien Canal | (France) Jean-Karl Vernay | (France) Jean-Karl Vernay | (France) SG Formula |

== Results and standings ==
Race point system
| Position | 1st | 2nd | 3rd | 4th | 5th | 6th | 7th | 8th | 9th | 10th |
| Points | 15 | 12 | 10 | 8 | 6 | 5 | 4 | 3 | 2 | 1 |

- In each race 1 point for Fastest lap and 1 for Pole position.
- Point system : 15, 12, 10, 8, 6, 5, 4, 3, 2, 1 for 10th. In each race 1 point for Fastest lap and 1 for Pole position.

| Pos | Driver | (France) NOG | | (France) DIJ | | (France) PAU | | (France) VDV | | (France) ALB | | (France) LEM | (France) MAG | | Points |
| Pos | Driver | 1 | 2 | 3 | 4 | 5 | 6 | 7 | 8 | 9 | 10 | 11 | 12 | 13 | Points |
|---|---|---|---|---|---|---|---|---|---|---|---|---|---|---|---|
| 1 | (France) Laurent Groppi | 2 | 1 | 3 | 2 | 1 | 1 | 1 | 1 | 1 | 2 | 5 | 26 | 7 | 140 |
| 2 | (France) Jean-Karl Vernay | Ret | 2 | 1 | Ret | 2 | Ret | 5 | 2 | 2 | 5 | Ret | 2 | 1 | 108 |
| 3 | (France) Julien Jousse | 5 | 3 | 6 | 1 | 3 | 11 | 7 | 3 | 7 | 8 | 6 | 4 | 5 | 89 |
| 4 | (France) Johan Charpilienne | 1 | 4 | 2 | 5 | 6 | 5 | 23 | DNS | 4 | Ret | 3 | Ret | 9 | 78 |
| 5 | (France) Nelson Panciatici | 6 | 11 | 10 | 10 | 8 | 3 | 3 | 8 | 3 | 1 | Ret | 25 | 3 | 71 |
| 6 | (France) Julien Canal | 4 | 27 | 13 | 6 | 10 | 4 | 6 | 4 | 9 | Ret | 4 | 9 | 2 | 61 |
| 7 | (France) Mathieu Arzeno | Ret | 7 | 17 | 15 | 4 | 8 | 2 | 5 | 6 | 3 | 9 | 13 | 16 | 52 |
| 8 | (Belgium) Bertrand Baguette | Ret | 15 | 4 | 3 | 7 | 10 | 4 | 11 | | | NC | 5 | 4 | 48 |
| 9 | (France) Malo Olivier | 9 | 5 | 8 | 12 | Ret | 6 | 8 | 7 | 5 | 4 | Ret | 8 | 11 | 41 |
| 10 | (France) Tom Dillmann | Ret | 13 | Ret | 9 | 24 | Ret | | | | | 1 | 1 | Ret | 34 |
| 11 | (France) Franck Mailleux | | | 5 | 4 | | | | | | | 2 | | | 28 |
| 12 | (France) Alexandre Marsoin | 3 | 9 | 15 | 14 | 11 | 12 | 11 | DNS | 11 | 6 | Ret | 7 | 6 | 26 |
| 13 | (Netherlands) Carlo van Dam | 22 | Ret | | | 9 | 2 | | | | | Ret | 3 | 25 | 25 |
| 14 | (France) Nicolas Navarro | 8 | 6 | 7 | 7 | 5 | Ret | 15 | 14 | | | 12 | 12 | 14 | 25 |
| 15 | (France) Jean-Philippe Bournot | 10 | 10 | 11 | Ret | 16 | 9 | 9 | 6 | 8 | 13 | 11 | 19 | 12 | 17 |
| 16 | (France) Thomas Accary | 7 | 8 | Ret | DNS | 12 | 7 | 10 | Ret | 20 | 10 | | | | 14 |
| 17 | (Switzerland) Nicolas Maulini | 12 | Ret | Ret | 8 | 15 | 13 | | | | | Ret | 6 | 13 | 9 |
| 18 | (France) Damien Claverie | 11 | 16 | Ret | DNS | 13 | 14 | | | 15 | 7 | | | | 4 |
| 19 | (Switzerland) Jonathan Hirschi | | | | | | | 19 | DNS | | | | 17 | 8 | 3 |
| 20 | (Finland) Valle Mäkelä | | | 9 | 11 | | | | | | | | | | 3 |
| 21 | (France) Sylvain Milesi | Ret | 17 | | | | | 18 | 9 | 19 | 11 | | 18 | 24 | 3 |
| 22 | (France) Kevin Van Heek | 14 | 14 | 12 | DNS | | | 14 | 10 | 12 | Ret | Ret | 16 | Ret | 1 |
| 23 | (France) Michaël Rossi | Ret | 12 | 19 | 23 | 25 | 16 | 12 | DNS | 10 | Ret | | 10 | Ret | 1 |
| 24 | (France) Guilhem Verdier | 17 | 23 | Ret | 19 | Ret | 19 | 20 | 19 | 17 | 12 | 13 | 23 | 23 | 1 |
| 25 | (Bahrain) Salman Al Khalifa | 19 | 26 | 23 | 22 | 22 | 18 | Ret | DNS | | | 14 | 20 | 15 | 1 |
| 26 | (France) Sébastien Chardonnet | Ret | 21 | 16 | 13 | 14 | 17 | 12 | 17 | 13 | Ret | Ret | 15 | 17 | 0 |
| 27 | (France) Eric Bergerot | 20 | 25 | 20 | DNS | 19 | 24 | 21 | 18 | Ret | 15 | 18 | 22 | 18 | 0 |
| 28 | (France) Stéphane Freve | 13 | 18 | 18 | 20 | 17 | 15 | 16 | 15 | | | 17 | | | 0 |
| 29 | (France) Rodolphe Hauchard | 21 | 24 | 21 | 18 | 20 | 22 | | | 16 | 14 | | 24 | 22 | 0 |
| 30 | (France) Stéphanie Tesson | Ret | 20 | 24 | Ret | 18 | DNS | 17 | 16 | | | | Ret | 20 | 0 |
| 31 | (France) Mathieu Santi | 15 | 19 | Ret | 21 | 21 | 20 | 22 | 20 | | | | | | 0 |
| 32 | (United Kingdom) Adam Perkins | 18 | 28 | 22 | Ret | 23 | 21 | 24 | 21 | | | 21 | | | 0 |
| 33 | (France) Benjamin Rouget | Ret | Ret | Ret | 16 | DNS | 23 | | | | | | | | 0 |
| 34 | (China) Cong Fu Cheng | | | 14 | 17 | | | | | | | | | | 0 |
| 35 | (France) Christophe Lefranc | | | | | | | 13 | 13 | | | | | | 0 |
| 36 | (France) Daniel Harout | 16 | 22 | | | | | | | | | | | | 0 |
Guest Drivers ineligible for points.
| | (Romania) Mihai Marinescu | | | | | | | | | | | 7 | DNS | 10 | |
| | (France) Ulric Amado | | | | | | | | | Ret | Ret | 8 | 11 | Ret | |
| | (France) Pierre-Brice Ména | | | | | | | | | 14 | 9 | 15 | 14 | 26 | |
| | (France) Pierre Combot | | | | | | | | | | | 10 | | | |
| | (France) Hugues Chabaud | | | | | | | | | 18 | 16 | 19 | | | |
| | (France) Claude Monteiro | | | | | | | | | | | 16 | | | |
| | (Switzerland) Didier Josseron | | | | | | | | | | | | 21 | 19 | |
| | (France) Jérôme Sornicle | | | | | | | | | | | 20 | | | |
| | (Switzerland) Fabien Thuner | | | | | | | | | | | | Ret | 21 | |

- (R) = Rookies drivers

=== Teams ===
| Pos | Team | Points |
|---|---|---|
| 1 | (France) SG Formula | 239 |
| 2 | (France) Graff Racing | 232 |
| 3 | (France) Epsilon Sport | 141 |
| 4 | (France) Pôle Services | 93 |
| 5 | (France) Hexis Racing | 42 |
| 6 | (United Kingdom) Manor Motorsport | 31 |
| 7 | (Switzerland) NMRT | 9 |
| 8 | (France) MC Racing | 6 |
| 9 | (France) Racing Team Trajectoire | 2 |
| 10 | (France) SCF Competition | 0 |
| 11 | (France) RBA Sport | 0 |
| 12 | (France) Lycée Pro Nogaro | 0 |

=== Rookies ===
| Pos | Driver | Points |
|---|---|---|
| 1 | (France) Mathieu Arzeno | 134 |
| 2 | (France) Jean Karl Vernay | 129 |
| 3 | (France) Alexandre Marsoin | 111 |
| 4 | (France) Jean-Philippe Bournot | 110 |
| 5 | (France) Sébastien Chardonnet | 63 |
| 6 | (France) Guilhem Verdier | 54 |
| 7 | (France) Kevin Van Heek | 51 |
| 8 | (France) Eric Bergerot | 39 |
| 9 | (France) Michaël Rossi | 38 |
| 10 | (Bahrain) Salman Al Khalifa | 38 |
| 11 | (Finland) Valle Mäkelä | 27 |
| 12 | (United Kingdom) Adam Perkins | 22 |
| 13 | (France) Benjamin Rouget | 8 |
