= 2004 Championnat de France Formula Renault 2.0 =

Motor racing competition

Seasons
- ← 2003 2005 →

The 2004 Championnat de France Formula Renault 2.0 was a highly competitive racing series held in France. Patrick Pilet emerged as the champion, showcasing exceptional driving skills throughout the season. The championship featured multiple rounds at renowned circuits and attracted a competitive field of young drivers. It served as a crucial stepping stone for aspiring racers, providing them with valuable experience and opportunities to advance in their motorsport careers.

== Drivers and Teams ==
Team	No.	Driver	Rounds
(France) Graff Racing	1	(France) Patrick Pilet	All
(France) Graff Racing	2	(Belgium) Jérôme d'Ambrosio	All
(France) Graff Racing	3	(France) Pierre Ragues	1–3
(France) Graff Racing	4	(France) Johan Charpilienne	All
(France) Graff Racing	5	(France) Julien Canal	1, 4, 6–7
(France) Graff Racing	23	(France) Ludovic Badey	5–7
(France) Graff Racing	28	(France) Simon Pagenaud	1, 4, 6–7
(France) SG Formula	3	(France) Pierre Ragues	5–7
(France) SG Formula	8	(France) Guillaume Moreau	All
(France) SG Formula	9	(France) Yann Clairay	All
(France) SG Formula	10	(France) Romain Grosjean	All
(France) Tech 1 Racing	6	(France) Julien Falcini-Joulian	1–4
(France) Tech 1 Racing	7	(France) Franck Mailleux	All
(France) Tech 1 Racing	23	(France) Ludovic Badey	1–4
(France) Tech 1 Racing	36	(France) Alexandre Vicendet	5
(France) Tech 1 Racing	37	(France) Bruce Lorgeré-Roux	6–7
(France) Tech 1 Racing	43	(France) Damien Claverie	7
(France) Green Team	6	(France) Julien Falcini-Joulian	5
(France) Green Team	14	(France) Ulric Amado	All
(France) Green Team	15	(France) Benjamin Breton	1
(France) Green Team	30	(France) Cedric Valdevit	2–4
(France) Green Team	32	(France) Daniel Harout	1
(France) Green Team	63	(France) Malo Olivier	All
(France) Pole Services	11	(France) Romain Yvon	1–4, 6–7
(France) Pole Services	17	(France) Christophe Lefranc	1–4, 6–7
(France) Pole Services	31	(France) Fabien Sarrailh	3
(France) Pole Services	40	(Mexico) Homero Richards	6
(France) Pole Services	42	(France) Emmanuel Piget	7
(France) Pole Services	60	(France) Adeline Sangnier	1–2, 4, 6
(France) Pole Services	78	(France) Olivier Metz	1, 3–4
(France) Hexis Racing	12	(France) Julien Jousse	All
(France) Hexis Racing	34	(France) Clément Mateu	All
(France) Hexis Racing	35	(France) Julien Rodrigues	1, 4, 6
(France) Hexis Racing	94	(France) Pierre Alain Bournot	All
(France) CD Sport	16	(France) Jean-Francis Gagneraud	1–4
(France) CD Sport	39	(France) Morgan Moullin Traffort	5
(France) Thierry Parriaux Compétition	18	(France) William Cavailhes	1–2, 4–5, 7
(France) Thierry Parriaux Compétition	19	(France) Philippe Maurin	1–2, 4–5, 7
(France) Thierry Parriaux Compétition	27	(France) Sylvain Milesi	1–2, 4–5, 7
(France) Play Station Junior Team Oreca	20	(France) Nicolas Prost	All
(France) Play Station Junior Team Oreca	21	(France) Laurent Groppi	All
(France) RBA Sport	22	(France) Rodolphe Hauchard	1, 5–7
(France) RBA Sport	22	(France) Laurent Hauchard	3–4
(France) RBA Sport	24	(France) Sébastien Dhouailly	1–3
(France) RBA Sport	26	(France) Steve Guarato	1–4, 6–7
(France) RBA Sport	29	(France) Stéphanie Tesson	All
(France) RBA Sport	33	(France) Thierry Archer	2
(France) RBA Sport	38	(France) Jo Morillas	5
(France) Ecurie Vaillant	25	(France) Christophe Laudat	All
(France) Lycée D'Artagnan	32	(France) Daniel Harout	3

== Race calendar and results ==
Round		Circuit	Date	Pole position	Fastest lap	Winning driver	Winning team
1	1	(France) Circuit Paul Armagnac	April 11	(France) Guillaume Moreau	(France) Guillaume Moreau	(France) Guillaume Moreau	(France) SG Formula
1	2	(France) Circuit Paul Armagnac	April 12	(France) Guillaume Moreau	(France) Guillaume Moreau	(France) Yann Clairay	(France) SG Formula
2	3	(France) Circuit du Val de Vienne	May 15	(France) Patrick Pilet	(France) Patrick Pilet	(France) Patrick Pilet	(France) Graff Racing
2	4	(France) Circuit du Val de Vienne	May 16	(France) Patrick Pilet	(France) Patrick Pilet	(France) Patrick Pilet	(France) Graff Racing
3	5	(France) Pau Grand Prix	May 30	(France) Guillaume Moreau	(France) Guillaume Moreau	(France) Guillaume Moreau	(France) SG Formula
3	6	(France) Pau Grand Prix	May 31	(France) Patrick Pilet	(France) Guillaume Moreau	(France) Patrick Pilet	(France) Graff Racing
4	7	(France) Dijon-Prenois	June 19	(France) Romain Grosjean	(France) Romain Grosjean	(France) Romain Grosjean	(France) SG Formula
4	8	(France) Dijon-Prenois	June 20	(France) Romain Grosjean	(France) Simon Pagenaud	(France) Simon Pagenaud	(France) Graff Racing
5	9	(France) Circuit d'Albi	September 4	(France) Patrick Pilet	(France) Yann Clairay	(France) Yann Clairay	(France) SG Formula
5	10	(France) Circuit d'Albi	September 5	(France) Patrick Pilet	(France) Patrick Pilet	(France) Patrick Pilet	(France) Graff Racing
6	11	(France) Circuit de la Sarthe	September 25	(France) Yann Clairay	(France) Simon Pagenaud	(France) Guillaume Moreau	(France) SG Formula
6	12	(France) Circuit de la Sarthe	September 26	(France) Guillaume Moreau	(France) Simon Pagenaud	(France) Simon Pagenaud	(France) Graff Racing
7	13	(France) Circuit de Nevers Magny-Cours	October 16	(France) Patrick Pilet	(France) Simon Pagenaud	(France) Simon Pagenaud	(France) Graff Racing
7	14	(France) Circuit de Nevers Magny-Cours	October 17	(France) Patrick Pilet	(France) Simon Pagenaud	(France) Patrick Pilet	(France) Graff Racing

== Results and standings ==
Race point system
Position	1st	2nd	3rd	4th	5th	6th	7th	8th	9th	10th
Points	30	24	20	16	12	10	8	6	4	2

- 2 points for Pole position.

=== Drivers ===
Pos	Driver	(France) NOG		(France) VIE		(France) PAU		(France) DIJ		(France) ALB		(France) LEM		(France) MAG		Points
Pos	Driver	1	2	3	4	5	6	7	8	9	10	11	12	13	14	Points
1	(France) Patrick Pilet	2	2	1	1	2	1	4	2	Ret	1	3	4	Ret	1	300
2	(France) Yann Clairay	3	1	4	2	5	2	8	5	1	2	2	3	2	11	264
3	(France) Guillaume Moreau	1	11	3	Ret	1	6	2	4	5	5	1	2	3	9	227
4	(Belgium) Jérôme d'Ambrosio	8	26	Ret	4	4	4	3	3	4	4	9	Ret	4	4	156
5	(France) Laurent Groppi	19	4	2	9	3	3	9	9	6	6	7	5	5	3	154
6	(France) Simon Pagenaud	DNQ	DNQ					5	1			4	1	1	2	142
7	(France) Romain Grosjean	17	3	Ret	6	18	Ret	1	Ret	2	3	6	Ret	Ret	5	130
8	(France) Johan Charpilienne	4	5	Ret	7	21	5	21	12	10	20	11	15	12	Ret	52
9	(France) Ulric Amado	6	13	6	18	Ret	17	6	6	7	11	12	14	Ret	14	48
10	(France) Julien Falcini-Joulian	11	8	7	5	6	7	10	17	14	9					45
11	(France) Christophe Lefranc	18	Ret	5	3	10	12	Ret	Ret			10	9	14	17	43
12	(France) Pierre Ragues	20	6	Ret	Ret	9	18			8	8	15	7	11	10	40
13	(France) Franck Mailleux	16	Ret	Ret	8	13	8	Ret	13	13	7	5	Ret	8	Ret	38
14	(France) Julien Jousse	Ret	16	13	Ret	16	22	12	8	3	10	13	13	7	Ret	36
15	(France) Pierre Alain Bournot	7	Ret	8	Ret	7	Ret	7	Ret	9	Ret	Ret	Ret	10	Ret	34
16	(France) Ludovic Badey	5	10	Ret	11	8	15	13	11	15	21	17	11	Ret	8	27
17	(France) Malo Olivier	15	25	Ret	13	11	9	25	18	11	Ret	Ret	8	6	Ret	22
18	(France) Nicolas Prost	13	7	11	10	14	10	18	Ret	Ret	14	16	Ret	17	7	22
19	(France) Olivier Metz	DNQ	DNQ			15	11	11	7							8
20	(France) Romain Yvon	12	Ret	9	Ret	12	13	16	15			14	10	13	19	8
21	(France) Julien Canal	10	9					14	Ret			19	Ret	Ret	20	6
22	(France) Daniel Harout	9	23			24	Ret									4
23	(France) Sylvain Milesi	14	12	12	12			15	10	12	12			16	15	2
24	(France) Christophe Laudat	Ret	14	10	16	Ret	Ret	20	Ret	Ret	Ret	Ret	20	Ret	12	2
25	(France) Julien Rodrigues	DNQ	DNQ					22	14			18	12			0
26	(France) Clément Mateu	23	17	15	20	17	19	23	19	16	13	20	16	15	16	0
27	(France) Steve Guarato	22	27	18	Ret	Ret	16	17	20			24	Ret	18	13	0
28	(France) Stéphanie Tesson	25	Ret	14	Ret	22	Ret	Ret	Ret	17	15	23	18	Ret	Ret	0
29	(France) Sébastien Dhouailly	21	19	Ret	14	Ret	20									0
30	(France) Laurent Hauchard					19	14	24	Ret							0
31	(France) Rodolphe Hauchard	24	15							Ret	Ret	22	19	Ret	18	0
32	(France) Thierry Archer			19	15											0
33	(France) Cedric Valdevit			17	Ret	20	Ret	19	16							0
34	(France) Jean-Francis Gagneraud	30	21	16	17	Ret	Ret	Ret	Ret							0
35	(France) William Cavailhes	27	18	Ret	Ret			27	Ret	19	18			Ret	Ret	0
36	(France) Adeline Sangnier	28	22	Ret	19			26	Ret			25	21			0
37	(France) Philippe Maurin	29	24	Ret	21			28	Ret	22	Ret			20	Ret	0
38	(France) Benjamin Breton	26	20													0
39	(France) Fabien Sarrailh					23	21									0
Guest drivers ineligible for points.
	(France) Bruce Lorgeré-Roux											8	6	9	Ret	
	(France) Emmanuel Piget													Ret	6	
	(France) Morgan Moullin Traffort									18	16					
	(France) Jo Morillas									21	17					
	(Mexico) Homero Richards											21	17			
	(France) Alexandre Vicendet									20	19					
	(France) Damien Claverie													19	Ret	
