= Julien Jousse =

French racing driver (born 1986)

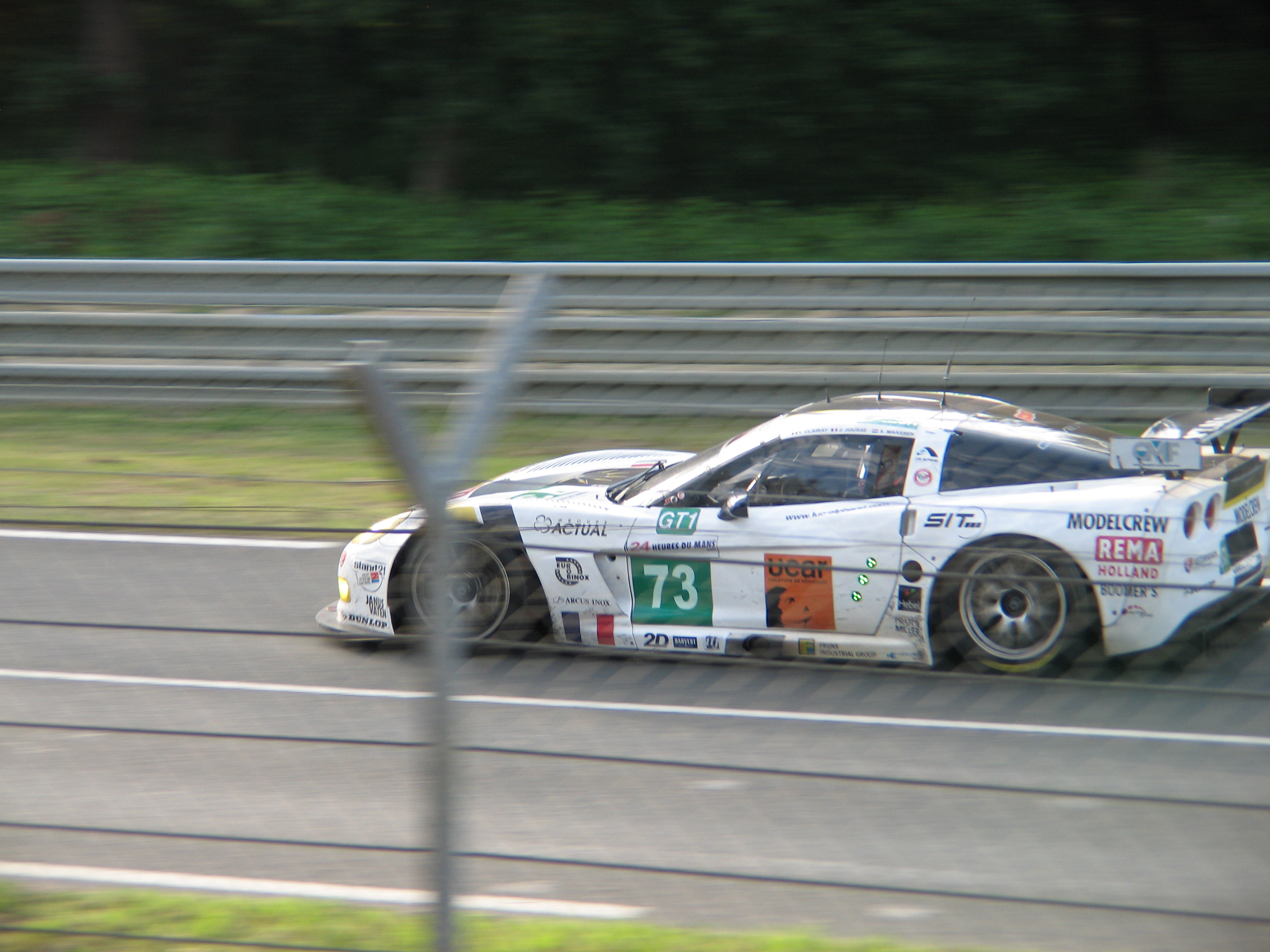
- Jousse in 2009
- Nationality: (France) French
- Born: Julien Claude Jousse; 21 January 1986 (age 40) Saint-Raphaël, Var, France
- Relatives: Maxime Jousse (brother)

FIA Formula Two Championship career
- Debut season: 2009
- Current team: MotorSport Vision
- Categorisation: FIA Platinum (until 2013); FIA Gold (2014–)
- Car number: 4
- Starts: 16
- Wins: 1
- Poles: 1
- Fastest laps: 2
- Best finish: 5th in 2009

Previous series
- 2002 2003 2004–06 2005–06 2007–08 2012 2012 2013: Formula Ford Kent; French Formula Ford; French Formula Renault 2.0; Eurocup Formula Renault 2.0; Formula Renault 3.5 Series; FIA World Endurance Championship; NASCAR K&N Pro Series West; ARCA Racing Series

24 Hours of Le Mans career
- Years: 2009 –
- Teams: Luc Alphand Aventures
- Best finish: 16th (2009)
- Class wins: 0

Julien Claude Jousse (born 21 January 1986 in Saint-Raphaël, Var) is a professional racing driver from France.

== Career ==
=== Formula Ford ===
After spending time in karting between 1997 and 2001, Jousse began has circuit racing career in 2002 in the Formula Ford Kent series. In the three races he contested, he took three podium finishes, including one race win. In 2003, he moved to the French Formula Ford series, taking a single podium place to finish the year in ninth place. He also took part in the end-of-season Formula Ford Festival at Brands Hatch, finishing in 17th position.

=== Formula Renault ===
For 2004, Jousse moved up to the French Formula Renault 2.0 championship with Hexis Racing. During his first season he took one podium finish to end the year in 14th place. He continued in the series for 2005, switching to the front running SG Formula team. He took three podium places, including a debut win at Magny-Cours, to finish sixth in the standings. He also took part in six Eurocup Formula Renault 2.0 races, scoring twelve points on his way to 21st overall.

Jousse stayed in French Formula Renault for a third season in 2006, securing a win and three further podiums on his way to third in the final standings. He also took part in a further two Eurocup Formula Renault 2.0 races, although he failed to score a point.

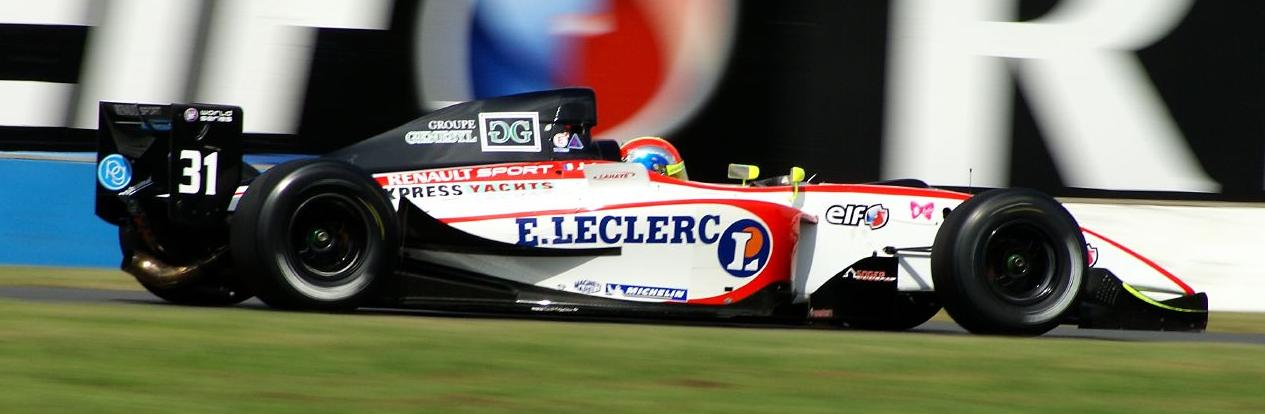
Jousse driving for Tech 1 Racing at the Donington Park round of the 2007 Formula Renault 3.5 Series season.

For 2007, Jousse stepped up to the Formula Renault 3.5 Series with the French Tech 1 Racing team. He finished the year in tenth place overall, taking one pole position, a fastest lap and three podium finishes during the season. In a very successful year his team-mate, Portugal's Álvaro Parente, won the drivers' championship with Tech 1 Racing taking the Teams' title.

Jousse stayed with the team for a second season in 2008, where he was joined by fellow countryman and Formula Renault graduate Charles Pic. He finished as runner-up in the championship, behind Giedo van der Garde, after taking six podium places, including his first series win in the final round at Barcelona. He also helped Tech 1 Racing secure their second consecutive Teams' championship.

=== Formula Two ===
After taking part in off-season GP2 testing with Fisichella Motor Sport and Trident Racing, Jousse joined the newly revived FIA Formula Two Championship for the 2009 season, driving car number four. He finished fifth in standings with a win coming at Donington Park.

=== Superleague Formula ===
Jousse raced in the Superleague Formula series in 2009 at the last two rounds of the season, driving for A.S. Roma replacing ex-IndyCar Series driver Franck Perera. He got a podium in his debut race at the Monza round.

=== NASCAR ===
Jousse competed in one NASCAR K&N Pro Series West event in 2012.

=== ARCA Racing Series ===
Jousse competed in one ARCA Racing Series race in 2013 season.

== Racing record ==
=== Career summary ===
Season	Series	Team	Races	Wins	Poles	F/Laps	Podiums	Points	Position
2002	Formula Ford Kent	Maion Racing	3	1	1	?	3	?	?
2003	French Formula Ford	Pegasus Racing	?	?	?	?	?	54	9th
2004	Championnat de France Formula Renault 2.0	Hexis Racing	13	0	0	1	1	36	14th
2005	Championnat de France Formula Renault 2.0	SG Formula	16	1	1	3	3	70	6th
2005	Eurocup Formula Renault 2.0	SG Formula	6	0	0	0	0	12	21st
2006	Championnat de France Formula Renault 2.0	SG Formula	13	1	1	4	4	89	**3rd**
2006	Eurocup Formula Renault 2.0	SG Formula	2	0	0	0	0	0	NC
2007	Formula Renault 3.5 Series	Tech 1 Racing	17	0	1	1	3	62	10th
2008	Formula Renault 3.5 Series	Tech 1 Racing	17	1	0	2	6	106	**2nd**
2009	FIA Formula Two Championship	MotorSport Vision	16	1	1	2	4	49	5th
2009	Superleague Formula	A.S. Roma	6	0	0	0	1	211	13th
2009	24 Hours of Le Mans - GT1	Luc Alphand Aventures	1	0	0	0	1	N/A	**2nd**
2010	FIA GT1 World Championship	Mad-Croc Racing	2	0	0	0	0	0	46th
2010	Superleague Formula	A.S. Roma	9	0	0	0	1	145	6th
2010	24 Hours of Le Mans - LMGT1	Luc Alphand Aventures	1	0	0	0	0	N/A	DNF
2011	Le Mans Series	Pescarolo Team	5	2	0	0	2	50	**1st**
2011	24 Hours of Le Mans	Pescarolo Team	1	0	0	0	0	N/A	DNF
2012	FIA World Endurance Championship - LMP1	Pescarolo Team	1	0	0	0	0	10	28th
2012	24 Hours of Le Mans - LMP1	Toyota Racing	Reserve driver						
2012	NASCAR K&N Pro Series West	CFK Motorsports	1	0	0	0	0	20	81st
2013	ARCA Racing Series	David Leiner	1	0	0	0	0	30	140th

=== Complete Eurocup Formula Renault 2.0 results ===
(key) (Races in bold indicate pole position; races in italics indicate fastest lap)

Year	Entrant	1	2	3	4	5	6	7	8	9	10	11	12	13	14	15	16	DC	Points
2005	SG Formula	ZOL; 1	ZOL; 2	VAL; 1	VAL; 2	LMS; 1; 8	LMS; 2 Ret	BIL; 1	BIL; 2	OSC; 1	OSC; 2	DON; 1	DON; 2	EST; 1; 19	EST; 2; 7	MNZ; 1 Ret	MNZ; 2; 7	21st	12
2006	SG Formula	ZOL; 1	ZOL; 2	IST; 1	IST; 2	MIS; 1	MIS; 2	NÜR; 1; 19	NÜR; 2; 14	DON; 1	DON; 2	LMS; 1	LMS; 2	CAT; 1	CAT; 2			NC†	0

† As Jousse was a guest driver, he was ineligible for points

=== Complete Formula Renault 3.5 Series results ===
(key) (Races in bold indicate pole position) (Races in italics indicate fastest lap)

Year	Team	1	2	3	4	5	6	7	8	9	10	11	12	13	14	15	16	17	Pos	Points
2007	Tech 1 Racing	MNZ; 1; 16	MNZ; 2; 7	NÜR; 1; 19	NÜR; 2 Ret	MON; 1; 16	HUN; 1; 5	HUN; 2; 7	SPA; 1; 21	SPA; 2; 14	DON; 1; 2	DON; 2; 7	MAG; 1; 9	MAG; 2; 3	**EST**; **1**; 2	EST; 2; 9	CAT; 1; 19	CAT; 2; 19	10th	62
2008	Tech 1 Racing	MNZ; 1; 3	MNZ; 2; 4	SPA; 1 Ret	SPA; 2 Ret	MON; 1; 4	SIL; 1; 7	SIL; 2; 10	HUN; 1; 2	HUN; 2; 2	NÜR; 1 Ret	NÜR; 2; 2	LMS; 1; 9	LMS; 2; 15	EST; 1; 4	EST; 2; 3	CAT; 1; 1	CAT; 2; 5	2nd	106

=== Complete FIA Formula Two Championship results ===
(key) (Races in bold indicate pole position) (Races in italics indicate fastest lap)

Year	1	2	3	4	5	6	7	8	9	10	11	12	13	14	15	16	DC	Points
2009	VAL; 1; 5	VAL; 2; 10	BRN; 1; 5	BRN; 2; 2	SPA; 1; 3	SPA; 2; 6	BRH; 1; 19	BRH; 2; 9	DON; 1; 7	**DON**; **2**; 1	OSC; 1 Ret	OSC; 2; 3	IMO; 1; 10	IMO; 2 Ret	CAT; 1; 4	CAT; 2; 8	5th	49

=== Superleague Formula ===
==== 2009 ====
(Races in bold indicate pole position) (Races in italics indicate fastest lap)

Year	Team	Operator	1	2	3	4	5		6		Position	Points
2009	A.S. Roma	Alan Docking Racing	MAG	ZOL	DON	EST	MOZ		JAR		13th	211
2009	A.S. Roma	Alan Docking Racing					3	17	15	16	13th	211

==== 2009 Super Final results ====
- Super Final results in 2009 did not count for points towards the main championship.

Year	Team	1	2	3	4	5	6
2009	A.S. Roma Alan Docking Racing	MAG	ZOL	DON	EST	MOZ; N/A	JAR; DNQ

==== 2010 ====
Year	Team	Operator	1			2			3			4			5			6			7			8			9			10			11	Position	Points
2010	A.S. Roma	DeVillota.com	SIL			ASS			MAG			JAR			NÜR			ZOL			BRH			ADR			POR			ORD			NAV	8th	458
2010	A.S. Roma	DeVillota.com	8	13	X	4	12	X	13	2	4	14	2	5	5	14	X	15	1	3	17	5	X	5	14	X	13	10	X	11	16	X		8th	458

=== FIA GT competition results ===
==== GT1 World Championship results ====
Year	Team	Car	1	2	3	4	5	6	7	8	9	10	11	12	13	14	15	16	17	18	19	20	Pos	Points
2010	Mad-Croc Racing	Corvette C6.R	ABU; QR	ABU; CR	SIL; QR	SIL; CR	BRN; QR	BRN; CR	PRI; QR	PRI; CR	SPA; QR	SPA; CR	NÜR; QR	NÜR; CR	ALG; QR; 7	ALG; CR; 14	NAV; QR	NAV; CR	INT; QR	INT; CR	SAN; QR	SAN; CR	46th	0

==== FIA GT Series results ====
Year	Team	Car	Class	1	2	3	4	5	6	7	8	9	10	11	12	Pos.	Points
2013	BMW Sports Trophy Team India	BMW Z4 GT3	Pro-Am	NOG; QR; 14	NOG; CR; 18	ZOL; QR; DNS	ZOL; CR; DNS	ZAN; QR	ZAN; QR	SVK; QR	SVK; CR	NAV; QR	NAV; CR	BAK; QR	BAK; CR	19th	7

=== 24 Hours of Le Mans results ===
Year	Team	Co-Drivers	Car	Class	Laps	Pos.	Class Pos.
2009	(France) Luc Alphand Aventures	(Netherlands) Xavier Maassen (France) Yann Clairay	Chevrolet Corvette C6.R	GT1	336	16th	**2nd**
2010	(France) Luc Alphand Aventures	(Netherlands) Xavier Maassen (France) Patrice Goueslard	Chevrolet Corvette C6.R	GT1	238	DNF	DNF
2011	(France) Pescarolo Team	(France) Emmanuel Collard (France) Christophe Tinseau	Pescarolo 01-Judd	LMP1	305	DNF	DNF

=== NASCAR ===
(key) (Bold - Pole position awarded by qualifying time. Italics - Pole position earned by points standings or practice time. * – Most laps led.)

==== K&N Pro Series West ====
NASCAR K&N Pro Series West results
Year	Team	No.	Make	1	2	3	4	5	6	7	8	9	10	11	12	13	14	15	NKNPSWC	Pts	Ref
2012	CFK Motorsports	73	Chevy	PHO	LHC	MMP	S99	IOW	BIR	LVS	SON	EVG	CNS	IOW	PIR	SMP	AAS; 24	PHO	81st	20	

=== ARCA Racing Series ===
(key) (Bold – Pole position awarded by qualifying time. Italics – Pole position earned by points standings or practice time. * – Most laps led.)

ARCA Racing Series results
Year	Team	No.	Make	1	2	3	4	5	6	7	8	9	10	11	12	13	14	15	16	17	18	19	20	21	ARSC	Pts	Ref
2013	David Leiner	94	Toyota	DAY; 40	MOB	SLM	TAL	TOL	ELK	POC	MCH	ROA	WIN	CHI	NJM	POC	BLN	ISF	MAD	DSF	IOW	SLM	KEN	KAN	141st	30	

Sporting positions
Preceded by Stéphane Sarrazin	Le Mans Series Champion; 2011 with: Emmanuel Collard	Succeeded by Mathias Beche; Pierre Thiriet
