= 2005 Eurocup Formula Renault 2.0 =

Motor racing competition

Seasons
- ← 2004 2006 →

The 2005 Eurocup Formula Renault 2.0 season was the fifteenth Eurocup Formula Renault 2.0 season. The season began at Zolder on 30 April and finished at Monza on 22 October, after sixteen races.

Japanese driver Kamui Kobayashi scored six victories at Bugatti Circuit, Oschersleben, Donington Park, Estoril and Monza during the season, he took the championship at the wheel of his Prema Powerteam-run car. Red Bull-backed driver Michael Ammermüller who competed with Jenzer Motorsport was the only Koboyashi's rival for championship title was not resolved until the final round, and Ammermüller finished in series' standings just eight points behind Japanese driver, winning races at Zolder, Valencia, Bilbao and Oschersleben. SG Formula's Yann Clairay amassed three wins on his way to third place in the series standings. Motopark Academy's Filipe Albuquerque completed the top five, despite missing Le Mans round.

== Teams and drivers ==
2005 Entry List
| Team | No. | Driver name | Rounds |
|---|---|---|---|
| (Germany) Motopark Academy | 1 | (Portugal) Filipe Albuquerque | 1–2, 4–8 |
| (Germany) Motopark Academy | 2 | (Argentina) Matías Milla | 1 |
| (Germany) Motopark Academy | 3 | (Finland) Teemu Nyman | All |
| (Germany) Motopark Academy | 38 | (United States) John Michael Edwards | 3–8 |
| (United Kingdom) Comtec Racing | 4 | (United Kingdom) Westley Barber | 1–4 |
| (United Kingdom) Comtec Racing | 5 | (United Kingdom) Pippa Mann | All |
| (United Kingdom) Comtec Racing | 63 | (Brazil) Gustavo Sondermann | 6 |
| (Netherlands) Mr Glow Motorsport | 6 | (Netherlands) Junior Strous | All |
| (Spain) Epsilon Euskadi | 7 | (Belgium) Bertrand Baguette | All |
| (Spain) Epsilon Euskadi | 8 | (Spain) Juan Antonio del Pino | All |
| (Spain) Epsilon Euskadi | 35 | (Spain) Jaime Alguersuari | 8 |
| (France) Graff Racing | 9 | (France) Julien Canal | All |
| (France) Graff Racing | 14 | (Japan) Hiroyuki Matsumura | All |
| (France) Graff Racing | 54 | (France) Nicolas Prost | 1–2 |
| (France) Graff Racing | 55 | (France) Ulric Amado de Carvalho | 2 |
| (France) Graff Racing | 57 | (France) Bruce Lorgère-Roux | 2 |
| (Switzerland) Jenzer Motorsport | 10 | (Colombia) Federico Montoya | All |
| (Switzerland) Jenzer Motorsport | 11 | (Germany) Michael Ammermüller | All |
| (Switzerland) Jenzer Motorsport | 12 | (South Africa) Adrian Zaugg | All |
| (Switzerland) Jenzer Motorsport | 18 | (Austria) Walter Grubmüller | All |
| (Switzerland) Jenzer Motorsport | 19 | (Switzerland) David Oberle | 1, 3–8 |
| (Italy) Prema Powerteam | 15 | (Japan) Kamui Kobayashi | All |
| (Italy) Prema Powerteam | 20 | (Brazil) Patrick Rocha | All |
| (Italy) Prema Powerteam | 21 | (France) Tom Dillmann | 1–3 |
| (Italy) Prema Powerteam | 67 | (Romania) Mihai Marinescu | 7–8 |
| (Russia) Lukoil Racing Team | 16 | (Russia) Mikhail Aleshin | 1–2, 4–7 |
| (Russia) Lukoil Racing Team | 17 | (Russia) Sergey Afanasyev | 1–2, 4–8 |
| (Italy) Cram Competition | 21 | (France) Tom Dillmann | 4–5 |
| (Italy) Cram Competition | 26 | (Austria) Reinhard Kofler | 1–2 |
| (Italy) Cram Competition | 27 | (Brazil) Daniel Serra | All |
| (Italy) Cram Competition | 62 | (United Kingdom) Ben Hanley | 6 |
| (Italy) Cram Competition | 66 | (Venezuela) Giancarlo Serenelli | 7–8 |
| (Italy) JD Motorsport | 22 | (Brazil) Carlos Iaconelli | 1 |
| (Italy) JD Motorsport | 23 | (Italy) Marcello Puglisi | 1 |
| (Italy) JD Motorsport | 24 | (Netherlands) Xavier Maassen | All |
| (Italy) JD Motorsport | 37 | (Brazil) Alan Hellmeister | 6–8 |
| (Finland) Koiranen Bros Motorsport | 25 | (Finland) Atte Mustonen | 1–2, 4–6 |
| (Germany) SL Formula Racing | 28 | (Germany) Dima Raikhlin | 1–7 |
| (Germany) SL Formula Racing | 29 | (Switzerland) Cyndie Allemann | 1–2, 4–8 |
| (Denmark) Team Formula Sport | 30 | (Denmark) Kasper Andersen | All |
| (Spain) Pons Racing | 31 | (Spain) Dani Clos | All |
| (Spain) Pons Racing | 32 | (Spain) Miguel Molina | All |
| (France) SG Formula | 33 | (Netherlands) Carlo van Dam | All |
| (France) SG Formula | 34 | (France) Yann Clairay | All |
| (France) SG Formula | 52 | (Switzerland) Romain Grosjean | 1–2, 7–8 |
| (France) SG Formula | 53 | (France) Franck Mailleux | 1–3 |
| (France) SG Formula | 56 | (France) Julien Jousse | 3, 7–8 |
| (France) SG Formula | 58 | (France) Johan Charpilienne | 3 |
| (Netherlands) AR Motorsport | 37 | (Brazil) Alan Hellmeister | 1–5 |
| (Netherlands) AR Motorsport | 5? | (Brazil) Carlos Iaconelli | 2 |
| (Italy) Euronova Racing | 51 | (Belgium) Jérôme d'Ambrosio | 1 |
| (Italy) Euronova Racing | 64 | (Italy) Alberto Costa | 7–8 |
| (Italy) Euronova Racing | 65 | (Italy) Marco Frezza | 7–8 |
| (France) Epsilon Sport | 59 | (France) Pierre Ragues | 2–3, 5, 7 |
| (Italy) RP Motorsport | 68 | (Italy) Davide Valsecchi | 8 |
| (Italy) Alan Racing | 69 | (Italy) Mauro Massironi | 8 |
| (Spain) Twincam Motorsport | 70 | (Spain) Oliver Campos-Hull | 8 |
| (Italy) BVM Racing | 71 | (Italy) Frederico Muggia | 8 |
| (Italy) BVM Racing | 72 | (Italy) Gary Cester | 8 |
| (Italy) BVM Racing | 73 | (Italy) Luca Persiani | 8 |

== Calendar ==
| Round | | Circuit | Date | Pole position | Fastest lap | Winning driver | Winning team |
|---|---|---|---|---|---|---|---|
| 1 | R1 | (Belgium) Circuit Zolder | 30 April | (Germany) Michael Ammermüller | (Japan) Kamui Kobayashi | (Germany) Michael Ammermüller | (Switzerland) Jenzer Motorsport |
| 1 | R2 | (Belgium) Circuit Zolder | 1 May | (Germany) Michael Ammermüller | (Germany) Michael Ammermüller | (Germany) Michael Ammermüller | (Switzerland) Jenzer Motorsport |
| 2 | R1 | (Spain) Circuit Ricardo Tormo, Valencia | 4 June | (Germany) Michael Ammermüller | (Germany) Michael Ammermüller | (Germany) Michael Ammermüller | (Switzerland) Jenzer Motorsport |
| 2 | R2 | (Spain) Circuit Ricardo Tormo, Valencia | 5 June | (Germany) Michael Ammermüller | (South Africa) Adrian Zaugg | (Germany) Michael Ammermüller | (Switzerland) Jenzer Motorsport |
| 3 | R1 | (France) Bugatti Circuit, Le Mans | 9 July | (France) Yann Clairay | (Japan) Kamui Kobayashi | (Japan) Kamui Kobayashi | (Italy) Prema Powerteam |
| 3 | R2 | (France) Bugatti Circuit, Le Mans | 10 July | (France) Yann Clairay | (Belgium) Bertrand Baguette | (France) Yann Clairay | (France) SG Formula |
| 4 | R1 | (Spain) Circuito Urbano Bilbao | 16 July | (Germany) Michael Ammermüller | (Germany) Michael Ammermüller | (Germany) Michael Ammermüller | (Switzerland) Jenzer Motorsport |
| 4 | R2 | (Spain) Circuito Urbano Bilbao | 17 July | (South Africa) Adrian Zaugg | (Netherlands) Junior Strous | (South Africa) Adrian Zaugg | (Switzerland) Jenzer Motorsport |
| 5 | R1 | (Germany) Motorsport Arena Oschersleben | 6 August | (France) Yann Clairay | (Denmark) Kasper Andersen | (Japan) Kamui Kobayashi | (Italy) Prema Powerteam |
| 5 | R2 | (Germany) Motorsport Arena Oschersleben | 7 August | (Germany) Michael Ammermüller | (Germany) Michael Ammermüller | (Germany) Michael Ammermüller | (Switzerland) Jenzer Motorsport |
| 6 | R1 | (United Kingdom) Donington Park | 10 September | (Japan) Kamui Kobayashi | (Japan) Kamui Kobayashi | (Japan) Kamui Kobayashi | (Italy) Prema Powerteam |
| 6 | R2 | (United Kingdom) Donington Park | 11 September | (Japan) Kamui Kobayashi | (Japan) Kamui Kobayashi | (Japan) Kamui Kobayashi | (Italy) Prema Powerteam |
| 7 | R1 | (Portugal) Circuito do Estoril | 1 October | (Japan) Kamui Kobayashi | (France) Yann Clairay | (Japan) Kamui Kobayashi | (Italy) Prema Powerteam |
| 7 | R2 | (Portugal) Circuito do Estoril | 2 October | (France) Yann Clairay | (Netherlands) Carlo van Dam | (France) Yann Clairay | (France) SG Formula |
| 8 | R1 | (Italy) Monza Circuit | 22 October | (Japan) Kamui Kobayashi | (Japan) Kamui Kobayashi | (Japan) Kamui Kobayashi | (Italy) Prema Powerteam |
| 8 | R2 | (Italy) Monza Circuit | 23 October | (France) Yann Clairay | (Brazil) Patrick Rocha | (France) Yann Clairay | (France) SG Formula |

== Championship standings ==
=== Drivers ===
Points are awarded to the drivers as follows:

| Position | 1 | 2 | 3 | 4 | 5 | 6 | 7 | 8 | 9 | 10 | PP |
|---|---|---|---|---|---|---|---|---|---|---|---|
| Points | 15 | 12 | 10 | 8 | 6 | 5 | 4 | 3 | 2 | 1 | 1 |

| Pos | Driver | ZOL (Belgium) | | VAL (Spain) | | LMS (France) | | BIL (Spain) | | OSC (Germany) | | DON (United Kingdom) | | EST (Portugal) | | MNZ (Italy) | | Points |
| Pos | Driver | 1 | 2 | 3 | 4 | 5 | 6 | 7 | 8 | 9 | 10 | 11 | 12 | 13 | 14 | 15 | 16 | Points |
|---|---|---|---|---|---|---|---|---|---|---|---|---|---|---|---|---|---|---|
| 1 | (Japan) Kamui Kobayashi | Ret | 14 | 2 | 4 | 1 | 5 | 5 | Ret | 1 | 4 | **1** | **1** | **1** | 4 | **1** | 3 | 157 |
| 2 | (Germany) Michael Ammermüller | **1** | **1** | **1** | **1** | 3 | 6 | **1** | 2 | 21 | **1** | Ret | 3 | 2 | Ret | Ret | Ret | 149 |
| 3 | (France) Yann Clairay | 17 | 4 | 4 | 28 | **2** | **1** | 2 | Ret | **2** | 2 | Ret | 19 | 3 | **1** | 11 | **1** | 125 |
| 4 | (Netherlands) Carlo van Dam | Ret | 7 | 24 | 5 | 4 | 4 | 6 | 3 | 6 | 3 | 4 | 6 | 5 | 3 | 27 | 2 | 100 |
| 5 | (Portugal) Filipe Albuquerque | Ret | 12 | 11 | 16 | | | 4 | 8 | 3 | 5 | Ret | 4 | 4 | 2 | 4 | Ret | 63 |
| 6 | (South Africa) Adrian Zaugg | 7 | 9 | 23 | 9 | 11 | 3 | 3 | **1** | Ret | 15 | 2 | Ret | 11 | Ret | DSQ | Ret | 57 |
| 7 | (Netherlands) Junior Strous | 4 | 32 | 20 | 11 | 12 | 2 | 10 | 7 | Ret | 11 | 12 | 2 | 12 | 8 | 9 | Ret | 43 |
| 8 | (Belgium) Bertrand Baguette | 6 | 18 | 5 | 10 | 7 | 21 | DSQ | 4 | 7 | 12 | Ret | 5 | 15 | 9 | 23 | 5 | 43 |
| 9 | (Japan) Hiroyuki Matsumura | 20 | Ret | 9 | Ret | 15 | 8 | 14 | 9 | Ret | 16 | 19 | 12 | 28 | 14 | 2 | 9 | 33 |
| 10 | (Netherlands) Xavier Maassen | 18 | 10 | 8 | NC | 14 | 10 | 12 | 15 | 15 | 10 | 5 | Ret | 9 | 5 | 3 | 16 | 32 |
| 11 | (Brazil) Alan Hellmeister | 9 | 6 | 6 | 13 | Ret | 14 | 9 | 5 | Ret | 6 | Ret | 18 | 7 | 27 | Ret | 11 | 31 |
| 12 | (Switzerland) Romain Grosjean | Ret | 5 | 3 | 2 | | | | | | | | | 32 | DNS | Ret | 24 | 28 |
| 13 | (Brazil) Patrick Rocha | 8 | 13 | 31 | 20 | Ret | Ret | 8 | 10 | Ret | 9 | 7 | 8 | 8 | 6 | Ret | 17 | 26 |
| 14 | (Austria) Reinhard Kofler | 5 | 3 | 7 | 6 | | | | | | | | | | | | | 25 |
| 15 | (Belgium) Jérôme d'Ambrosio | 3 | 2 | | | | | | | | | | | 20 | 28 | Ret | 15 | 22 |
| 16 | (France) Julien Canal | Ret | 6 | 22 | Ret | 10 | 11 | 13 | 16 | 20 | 18 | 22 | 14 | 22 | Ret | 6 | 4 | 17 |
| 17 | (Brazil) Daniel Serra | 26 | 15 | 12 | 8 | 5 | 16 | 18 | Ret | 13 | 8 | Ret | Ret | 10 | Ret | 7 | 20 | 17 |
| 18 | (United Kingdom) Westley Barber | 2 | Ret | 14 | Ret | Ret | 7 | 11 | 11 | | | | | | | | | 16 |
| 19 | (Denmark) Kasper Andersen | Ret | 24 | Ret | 17 | Ret | 20 | 17 | 14 | 5 | Ret | 23 | Ret | 21 | 23 | 5 | 10 | 16 |
| 20 | (Finland) Atte Mustonen | 22 | 30 | 19 | 21 | | | 7 | Ret | 8 | 13 | 6 | Ret | | | | | 13 |
| 21 | (France) Julien Jousse | | | | | 8 | Ret | | | | | | | 19 | 7 | Ret | 7 | 12 |
| 22 | (Germany) Dima Raikhlin | Ret | 21 | Ret | Ret | Ret | Ret | 22 | 19 | Ret | 7 | 10 | Ret | 6 | Ret | | | 11 |
| 23 | (Finland) Teemu Nyman | 11 | 19 | 15 | 25 | | | 15 | 6 | 18 | Ret | 16 | 7 | 16 | 11 | 10 | 25 | 10 |
| 24 | (Russia) Sergey Afanasyev | Ret | 25 | Ret | 29 | | | Ret | DNS | 4 | Ret | 21 | 11 | 25 | 15 | 18 | Ret | 9 |
| 25 | (Switzerland) David Oberle | 19 | 20 | | | 9 | 12 | Ret | 21 | 9 | 19 | 8 | 17 | 14 | 10 | Ret | Ret | 9 |
| 26 | (France) Franck Mailleux | 13 | 22 | 13 | Ret | 6 | Ret | | | | | | | | | | | 5 |
| 27 | (France) Ulric Amado de Carvalho | | | Ret | 7 | | | | | | | | | | | | | 4 |
| 28 | (Spain) Miguel Molina | 21 | 26 | 28 | Ret | 17 | Ret | 20 | 18 | 12 | 23 | 14 | Ret | 18 | Ret | 8 | 19 | 3 |
| 29 | (Spain) Juan Antonio del Pino | 10 | 17 | 16 | 12 | Ret | 15 | 24 | 12 | Ret | 27 | 13 | 9 | 17 | 16 | Ret | Ret | 3 |
| 30 | (Russia) Mikhail Aleshin | 12 | 11 | 18 | 19 | | | DNS | DNS | Ret | 14 | 9 | Ret | Ret | 26 | | | 3 |
| 31 | (France) Pierre Ragues | | | Ret | 22 | Ret | 9 | | | 11 | 24 | | | 33 | 17 | | | 2 |
| 32 | (Spain) Dani Clos | Ret | 31 | 30 | Ret | 18 | 17 | Ret | 23 | 14 | Ret | 11 | 15 | 26 | 22 | 15 | 13 | 2 |
| 33 | (Colombia) Federico Montoya | 16 | 27 | 21 | 14 | 19 | Ret | Ret | 17 | 10 | 22 | Ret | 13 | 13 | 12 | 12 | 27 | 1 |
| 34 | (France) Bruce Lorgère-Roux | | | 10 | Ret | | | | | | | | | | | | | 1 |
| 35 | (United States) John Michael Edwards | | | 29 | 27 | | | 19 | 13 | 19 | 20 | 15 | Ret | 24 | DNS | 13 | 14 | 0 |
| 36 | (Austria) Walter Grubmüller | 24 | Ret | Ret | 16 | 26 | Ret | 21 | 24 | 16 | 17 | Ret | Ret | 23 | 13 | Ret | Ret | 0 |
| 37 | (France) Tom Dillmann | Ret | 28 | 26 | 23 | 13 | 19 | 16 | Ret | Ret | 21 | | | | | | | 0 |
| 38 | (France) Johan Charpilienne | | | | | 20 | 13 | | | | | | | | | | | 0 |
| 39 | (United Kingdom) Pippa Mann | 14 | Ret | DNS | Ret | Ret | 18 | 23 | 22 | Ret | 26 | 18 | Ret | 30 | 20 | 17 | Ret | 0 |
| 40 | (Brazil) Carlos Iaconelli | Ret | Ret | 17 | 15 | | | | | | | | | | | | | 0 |
| 41 | (Argentina) Matías Milla | 15 | 23 | | | | | | | | | | | | | | | 0 |
| 42 | (France) Nicolas Prost | 25 | 16 | 25 | 24 | | | | | | | | | | | | | 0 |
| 43 | (Switzerland) Cyndie Allemann | 23 | Ret | 27 | 18 | | | 25 | 20 | 17 | 25 | 20 | Ret | Ret | 18 | 22 | 18 | 0 |
| 44 | (Italy) Marco Frezza | | | | | | | | | | | | | 27 | 19 | Ret | 23 | 0 |
| 45 | (Venezuela) Giancarlo Serenelli | | | | | | | | | | | | | Ret | 24 | 20 | Ret | 0 |
| 46 | (Italy) Alberto Costa | | | | | | | | | | | | | 29 | 25 | 21 | 26 | 0 |
| 47 | (Romania) Mihai Marinescu | | | | | | | | | | | | | 31 | 21 | Ret | Ret | 0 |
| 48 | (Italy) Marcello Puglisi | Ret | 29 | | | | | | | | | | | | | | | 0 |
The following drivers are guest ineligible to final standing
| | (United Kingdom) Ben Hanley | | | | | | | | | | | 3 | 10 | | | | | – |
| | (Italy) Luca Persiani | | | | | | | | | | | | | | | Ret | 6 | – |
| | (Italy) Davide Valsecchi | | | | | | | | | | | | | | | 14 | 8 | – |
| | (Spain) Jaime Alguersuari | | | | | | | | | | | | | | | 24 | 12 | – |
| | (Brazil) Gustavo Sondermann | | | | | | | | | | | 17 | 16 | | | | | – |
| | (Spain) Oliver Campos-Hull | | | | | | | | | | | | | | | 16 | Ret | – |
| | (Italy) Mauro Massironi | | | | | | | | | | | | | | | 19 | 22 | – |
| | (Italy) Frederico Muggia | | | | | | | | | | | | | | | Ret | 21 | – |
| | (Italy) Gary Cester | | | | | | | | | | | | | | | Ret | Ret | – |
| Pos | Driver | ZOL (Belgium) | | VAL (Spain) | | LMS (France) | | BIL (Spain) | | OSC (Germany) | | DON (United Kingdom) | | EST (Portugal) | | MNZ (Italy) | | Points |

| Colour | Result |
|---|---|
| Gold | Winner |
| Silver | Second place |
| Bronze | Third place |
| Green | Points classification |
| Blue | Non-points classification |
| Blue | Non-classified finish (NC) |
| Purple | Retired, not classified (Ret) |
| Red | Did not qualify (DNQ) |
| Red | Did not pre-qualify (DNPQ) |
| Black | Disqualified (DSQ) |
| White | Did not start (DNS) |
| White | Withdrew (WD) |
| White | Race cancelled (C) |
| Blank | Did not practice (DNP) |
| Blank | Did not arrive (DNA) |
| Blank | Excluded (EX) |

**Bold** – Pole
Italics – Fastest Lap

== Teams ==
| Pos | Team | Points |
|---|---|---|
| 1 | (France) SG Formula | 270 |
| 2 | (Switzerland) Jenzer Motorsport | 216 |
| 3 | (Italy) Prema Powerteam | 182 |
| 4 | (Germany) Motopark Academy | 73 |
| 5 | (France) Graff Racing | 55 |
| 6 | (Spain) Epsilon Euskadi | 46 |
| 7 | (Netherlands) Mr Glow Motorsport | 43 |
| 8 | (Italy) Cram Competition | 42 |
| 9 | (Italy) JD Motorsport | 38 |
| 10 | (Netherlands) AR Motorsport | 25 |
| 11 | (Italy) Euronova Racing | 22 |
| 12 | (United Kingdom) Comtec Racing | 16 |
| 13 | (Denmark) Team Formula Sport | 16 |
| 14 | (Finland) Koiranen Bros Motorsport | 13 |
| 15 | (Russia) Lukoil Racing Team | 12 |
| 16 | (Germany) SL Formula Racing | 11 |
| 17 | (Spain) Pons Racing | 5 |
| 18 | (France) Epsilon Sport | 2 |
