= TC France Series =

Touring car racing series based in France

- Category: Touring car racing
- Country: France
- Inaugural season: 2021
- Classes: TCR, TC, TCA, TCA Light, GT Light
- Tyre suppliers: Michelin
- Official website: TC France

The TC France Series (also known as FFSA Championnat de France Tourisme) is a touring car racing series based in France, organized by SRO Motorsports Group, in partnership with the French Federation of Automobile Sport (FFSA), since 2021.

== History ==
The series was introduced in 2021, with the aim of attracting young drivers and amateurs competing in multiple classes of varying performance levels. It runs in conjunction other FFSA series as part of the GT Tour.

== Format ==
The race weekend consists of four, 25-minute, sprint races. When entries are shared between two drivers, one driver will complete the first qualifying session and start the first and third race, while the second driver will do the second qualifying session and start the second and fourth race of the weekend.

== Classes ==
The series is open to TCR Touring Cars (TCR) and various one-make touring and grand tourer cars, split between the classes TC, TCA, TCA Light and GT Light.

== Circuits ==
- (France) Circuit d'Albi (2021–2022)
- (France) Circuit de Dijon-Prenois (2023–present)
- (France) Circuit de Lédenon (2021–2025)
- (France) Circuit de Nevers Magny-Cours (2021–present)
- (Belgium) Circuit de Spa-Francorchamps (2021–2022, 2024–present)
- (France) Circuit du Val de Vienne (2023)
- (France) Circuit Paul Armagnac (2021–present)
- (France) Circuit Paul Ricard (2021–present)
