= Formula Renault 2.0 West European Cup =

Formula racing championship

- Category: Formula Renault 2.0
- Country: Western Europe
- Inaugural season: 1971
- Folded: 2009
- Drivers: 22 (2009)
- Teams: 9 (2009)
- Constructors: Tatuus
- Engine suppliers: Renault
- Last Drivers' champion: (Spain) Albert Costa
- Last Teams' champion: (Spain) Epsilon Euskadi
- Official website: www.formularenaultwec.com

The Formula Renault 2.0 West European Cup (WEC) was a Formula Renault 2.0 championship that replaced the Championnat de France Formula Renault 2.0 as of 2008, though the series was folded in 2010.

The WEC extends the French championship to the Iberian Peninsula and Belgium, and is organized by the French Signature-Plus team, who previously organised the French series with the support of the RPM Racing. The series will be managed by Patrick Sinault.

As in French Formula Renault, the Challenger Cup will be kept, rewarding the best driver using 2004-spec cars.

== French Formula Renault Championship ==
The French Formula Renault championship was the Formula Renault 2.0 championship held on France between 1971 and 2007. It was the oldest Formula Renault championship.

The name of the championship change during years:

- Critérium de Formule Renault (1971–1972)
- Not held (1973–1974)
- Championnat de France de Formule Renault Nationale (1975–1977)
- Championnat de France Formule Renault (1978–1981)
- Championnat de France Formule Renault Turbo (1982–1988)
- Championnat de France Formule Renault (1989–1999)
- Championnat de France Formule Renault 2000 (2000–2004)
- Championnat de France de Formule Renault 2.0 (2005–2007)

From 2008 the French championship is included in the West European Cup, for French drivers only, with results from the races held in France, to decide the championship.

The Challenger Cup reward the best driver using 2004 cars.

The last round of the French championship was held outside France in the Circuit de Catalunya, Barcelona as symbol of the series expansion to Western Europe (Portugal, Spain, France and Belgium) in 2008.

== Circuits ==
- (Portugal) Algarve International Circuit (2009)
- (France) Autodrome de Linas-Montlhéry (1971–1972)
- (France) Bugatti Circuit (1971–1972, 1975–2006, 2008–2009)
- (France) Circuit d'Albi (1971–1972, 1975–1993, 1996–2007)
- (Spain) Circuit de Barcelona-Catalunya (1997, 2007–2009)
- (France) Circuit de Charade (1971–1972, 1976–1999)
- (France) Circuit de Croix-en-Ternois (1975, 1980, 1983–1992, 2002)
- (France) Circuit de Folembray (1976–1977)
- (France) Circuit de la Châtre (1971–1972, 1975, 1978–1983)
- (France) Circuit de Lédenon (1977–1979, 1986–2007)
- (France) Circuit de Nevers Magny-Cours (1971–1973, 1975–1987, 1989–2009)
- (France) Circuit de Pau-Ville (1971–1972, 1975–2006, 2008–2009)
- (Belgium) Circuit de Spa-Francorchamps (1999, 2008–2009)
- (France) Circuit du Val de Vienne (1993–2007)
- (France) Circuit Paul Armagnac (1971–2009)
- (France) Circuit Paul Ricard (1971–1972, 1975–1983, 1986–1990, 1992–1998)
- (Spain) Circuit Ricardo Tormo (2000, 2008–2009)
- (Belgium) Circuit Zolder (1978–1982)
- (Spain) Circuito del Jarama (1986, 1994)
- (Portugal) Circuito do Estoril (1987, 1999, 2001, 2008)
- (France) Dijon-Prenois (1976–1981, 1984–1985, 1991–1994, 2002–2009)
- (United Kingdom) Donington Park (2003)
- (Germany) Hockenheimring (1978, 1980)
- (Italy) Imola Circuit (1976)
- (Italy) Monza Circuit (1980, 1995, 1999)
- (Germany) Nürburgring (1981)
- (France) Rouen-Les-Essarts (1972, 1975–1978, 1980–1993)
- (Italy) Vallelunga Circuit (1985)

== Regulations ==
- Practices session : 1 hour (or 2 x 30 minutes).
- Qualifying : Two 20 minute sessions without refueling.
- Races : Two individual races, the first between 60 and 80 km and the second lasting between 20 and 30 minutes.

Points are allocated as following :

Position	1st	2nd	3rd	4th	5th	6th	7th	8th	9th	10th
Points	15	12	10	8	6	5	4	3	2	1

In each race, 1 point was given for pole position and 1 for fastest lap. Only classified drivers were awarded points.

A Rookie classification was given if more than 6 drivers ran for the first time in the series.

== Champions ==
Season	Series Name	Champion	Team Champion
1971	Critérium de Formule Renault	(France) Michel Leclère	
1972	Critérium de Formule Renault	(France) Jacques Laffite	
1973	Not held		
1974	Not held		
1975	Championnat de Formule Renault Nationale	(France) Christian Debias	
1976	Championnat de Formule Renault Nationale	(France) Alain Prost	
1977	Championnat de Formule Renault Nationale	(France) Joël Gouhier	
1978	Championnat de France Formule Renault	(France) Philippe Alliot	
1979	Championnat de France Formule Renault	(France) Alain Ferté	
1980	Championnat de France Formule Renault	(France) Denis Morin	
1981	Championnat de France Formule Renault	(France) Philippe Renault	
1982	Championnat de France Formule Renault Turbo	(France) Gilles Lempereur	
1983	Championnat de France Formule Renault Turbo	(France) Jean-Pierre Hoursourigaray	
1984	Championnat de France Formule Renault Turbo	(France) Yannick Dalmas	
1985	Championnat de France Formule Renault Turbo	(France) Éric Bernard	
1986	Championnat de France Formule Renault Turbo	(France) Érik Comas	
1987	Championnat de France Formule Renault Turbo	(France) Claude Degremont	
1988	Championnat de France Formule Renault Turbo	(France) Ludovic Faure	
1989	Championnat de France Formule Renault	(France) Olivier Panis	
1990	Championnat de France Formule Renault	(France) Emmanuel Collard	
1991	Championnat de France Formule Renault	(France) Olivier Couvreur	
1992	Championnat de France Formule Renault	(France) Jean-Philippe Belloc	
1993	Championnat de France Formule Renault	(France) David Dussau	
1994	Championnat de France Formule Renault	(France) Stéphane Sarrazin	
1995	Championnat de France Formule Renault	(France) Cyrille Sauvage	
1996	Championnat de France Formule Renault	(France) Sébastien Enjolras	
1997	Championnat de France Formule Renault	(France) Jonathan Cochet	
1998	Championnat de France Formule Renault	(United Kingdom) Matthew Davies	
1999	Championnat de France Formule Renault	(France) Lucas Lasserre	
2000	Championnat de France Formule Renault 2000	(France) Renaud Derlot	
2001	Championnat de France Formule Renault 2000	(France) Eric Salignon	
2002	Championnat de France FFSA de Formule Renault	(France) Alexandre Prémat	
2003	Championnat de France Formule Renault 2000	(France) Loïc Duval	
2004	Championnat de France Formula Renault 2.0	(France) Patrick Pilet	
2005	Championnat de France Formula Renault 2.0	(France) Romain Grosjean	
2006	Championnat de France Formula Renault 2.0	(France) Laurent Groppi	
2007	Championnat de France Formula Renault 2.0	(France) Jules Bianchi	
2008	Formula Renault 2.0 West European Cup	(Australia) Daniel Ricciardo	(France) SG Formula
2009	Formula Renault 2.0 West European Cup	(Spain) Albert Costa	(Spain) Epsilon Euskadi
