= Circuit du Val de Vienne =

Motor racing circuit in Le Vigeant, France

- Main & Motorcycle Circuit (2008–present)
- Location: Le Vigeant, France
- Coordinates: 46°11′45″N 0°37′55″E
- FIA Grade: 2 (Note: Circuit du Val de Vienne's Grade 2 licence expired 19 May 2021.)
- Owner: Jack Leconte & Jacques Nicolet (2012–2032)
- Operator: Les Deux Arbres (2012–present)
- Opened: 1990
- Architect: René Monory
- Major events: Former: FFSA GT Championship (1997, 1999–2001, 2003–2015, 2023); TC France Series (2023); Porsche Carrera Cup France (1993–2001, 2003–2009, 2012, 2015); French F4 (2011–2014); Racecar Euro Series (2009–2010); French Formula Renault (1993–2007); French Supertouring Championship (1992–2000, 2005); French F3 (1993–2001); Eurocup Formula Renault (1995, 1997)
- Website: http://www.circuit-valdevienne.fr/

Main Circuit (2008–present)
- Length: 3.729 km (2.317 mi)
- Turns: 17
- Race lap record: 1:32.883 ( (France) Dominique Cauvin, Norma M20-FC, 2019, CN)

Motorcycle Circuit (2008–present)
- Length: 3.768 km (2.341 mi)
- Turns: 18

Main Circuit (1990–2007)
- Length: 3.757 km (2.334 mi)
- Turns: 18
- Race lap record: 1:33.922 ( (Japan) Ryō Fukuda, Dallara F399, 2000, F3)

Circuit du Val de Vienne is a 3.729 km (2.317 mi) motor racing circuit located in Le Vigeant, France. Opened in 1990, the circuit is operated by Les Deux Arbres, a group under the auspices of Jack Leconte and Jacques Nicolet.

In 2010, according to the Comité départemental du tourisme, the circuit welcomed 170,000 visitors. It is the fourth most visited tourist site in the Vienne department.

== Lap records ==
As of August 2026, the fastest official race lap records at the Circuit du Val de Vienne are listed as:

Category	Time	Driver	Vehicle	Event
Main Circuit (2008–present): 3.729 km (2.317 mi)
Group CN	1:32.883	Dominique Cauvin	Norma M20-FC	2019 Val de Vienne Speed Euroseries round
GT3	1:33.095	Grégory Guilvert	Audi R8 LMS	2012 Val de Vienne FFSA GT round
Porsche Carrera Cup	1:36.055	Côme Ledogar	Porsche 911 (997 II) GT3 Cup 3.8	2012 Val de Vienne Porsche Carrera Cup France round
Superbike	1:38.106	Christophe Ponsson	BMW M1000RR	2026 Val de Vienne French Superbike round
Formula Renault 1.6	1:38.991	Ivan Kostyukov	Signatech FR 1.6	2013 Val de Vienne French F4 round
GT4	1:40.794	Joran Leneutre	Alpine A110 GT4 Evo	2023 Val de Vienne FFSA GT round
Supersport	1:40.841	Mathieu Gines	Yamaha YZF-R9	2026 Val de Vienne French Supersport round
TCR Touring Car	1:42.685	Julien Paget	Volkswagen Golf GTI TCR	2023 Val de Vienne TC France round
Main Circuit (1990–2007): 3.757 km (2.334 mi)
Formula Three	1:33.922	Ryō Fukuda	Dallara F399	2000 Val de Vienne French F3 round
Formula Renault 2.0	1:38.290	Laurent Groppi	Tatuus FR2000	2006 Val de Vienne French Formula Renault round
GT2	1:42.823	Patrice Goueslard	Porsche 911 GT2	1997 Val de Vienne FFSA GT round
Porsche Carrera Cup	1:44.086	Renaud Derlot	Porsche 911 (997 I) GT3 Cup	2007 Val de Vienne Porsche Carrera Cup France round
Silhouette racing car	1:46.536	Soheil Ayari	Peugeot 407	2005 Val de Vienne French Supertouring round
Super Touring	1:47.925	William David	Peugeot 406	2000 Val de Vienne French Supertouring round
