= Laurent Groppi =

French racing driver

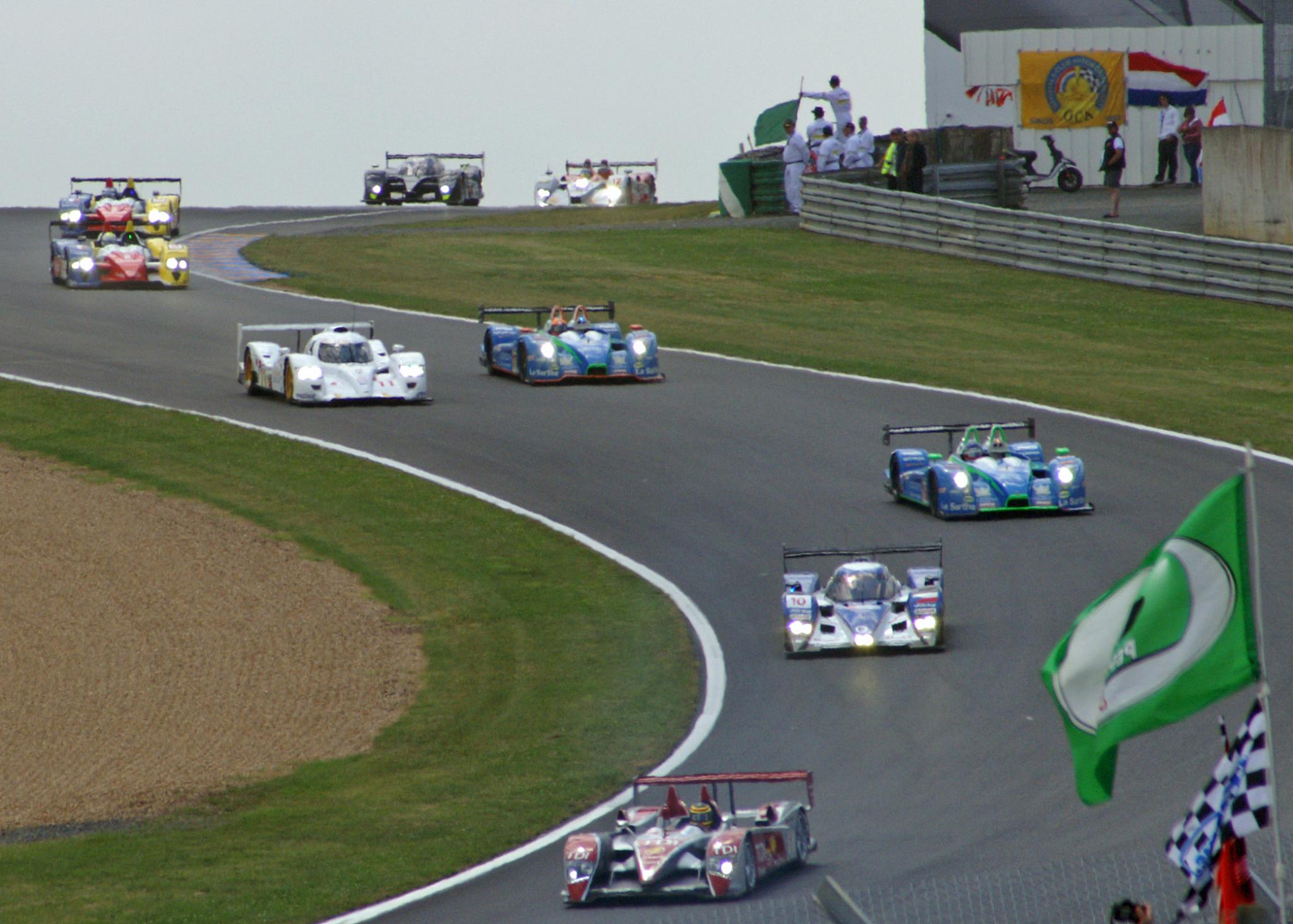
- Groppi's Courage-Oreca (background) during the warm-up lap at Le Mans 2008
- Nationality: (France) French
- Born: 19 January 1983 (age 43) Thonon-les-Bains, Haute-Savoie, France
- Categorisation: FIA Gold

Laurent Groppi (born 19 January 1983 in Thonon-les-Bains, Haute-Savoie) is a French racing driver.

Groppi won the Formula Campus by Renault and Elf in 2003 and the Championnat de France Formula Renault 2.0 in 2006. He also competed in Eurocup Formula Renault 2.0. In 2007, he finished second in the French GT Championship and finished fifth in the GT1 Class of the 2007 24 Hours of Le Mans driving a Team ORECA Saleen S7R.

Groppi returned to Oreca for the 2008 24 Hours of Le Mans, but this time finished eighth in LMP1 class in their Judd powered Courage-Oreca LC70. In 2009, he finished fifth in the Le Mans Series GT1 Class with Larbre Competition in their Saleen S7R. In 2010, he won the French GT Championship with Larbre in their Porsche 911 GT3.

== Racing record ==
=== Complete Eurocup Formula Renault 2.0 results ===
(key) (Races in bold indicate pole position; races in italics indicate fastest lap)

Year	Entrant	1	2	3	4	5	6	7	8	9	10	11	12	13	14	DC	Points
2006	Graff Racing	**ZOL**; **1**; 1	ZOL; 2; 1	IST; 1	IST; 2	MIS; 1	MIS; 2	NÜR; 1; 2	NÜR; 2; 2	DON; 1	DON; 2	LMS; 1; 7	LMS; 2; 4	CAT; 1	CAT; 2	6th	75

== 24 Hours of Le Mans results ==
Year	Team	Co-Drivers	Car	Class	Laps	Pos.	Class Pos.
2007	(France) Team Oreca	(France) Nicolas Prost (France) Jean-Philippe Belloc	Saleen S7-R	GT1	337	10th	5th
2008	(France) Team Oreca-Matmut	(France) Soheil Ayari (France) Loïc Duval	Courage-Oreca LC70-Judd	LMP1	357	8th	8th

Sporting positions
Preceded by Loïc Duval	Formula Campus Champion; 2003	Succeeded by Jacky Ferré
Preceded by Romain Grosjean	French Formula Renault 2.0; Champion; 2006	Succeeded by Jules Bianchi
