= Jules Bianchi =

French racing driver (1989–2015)

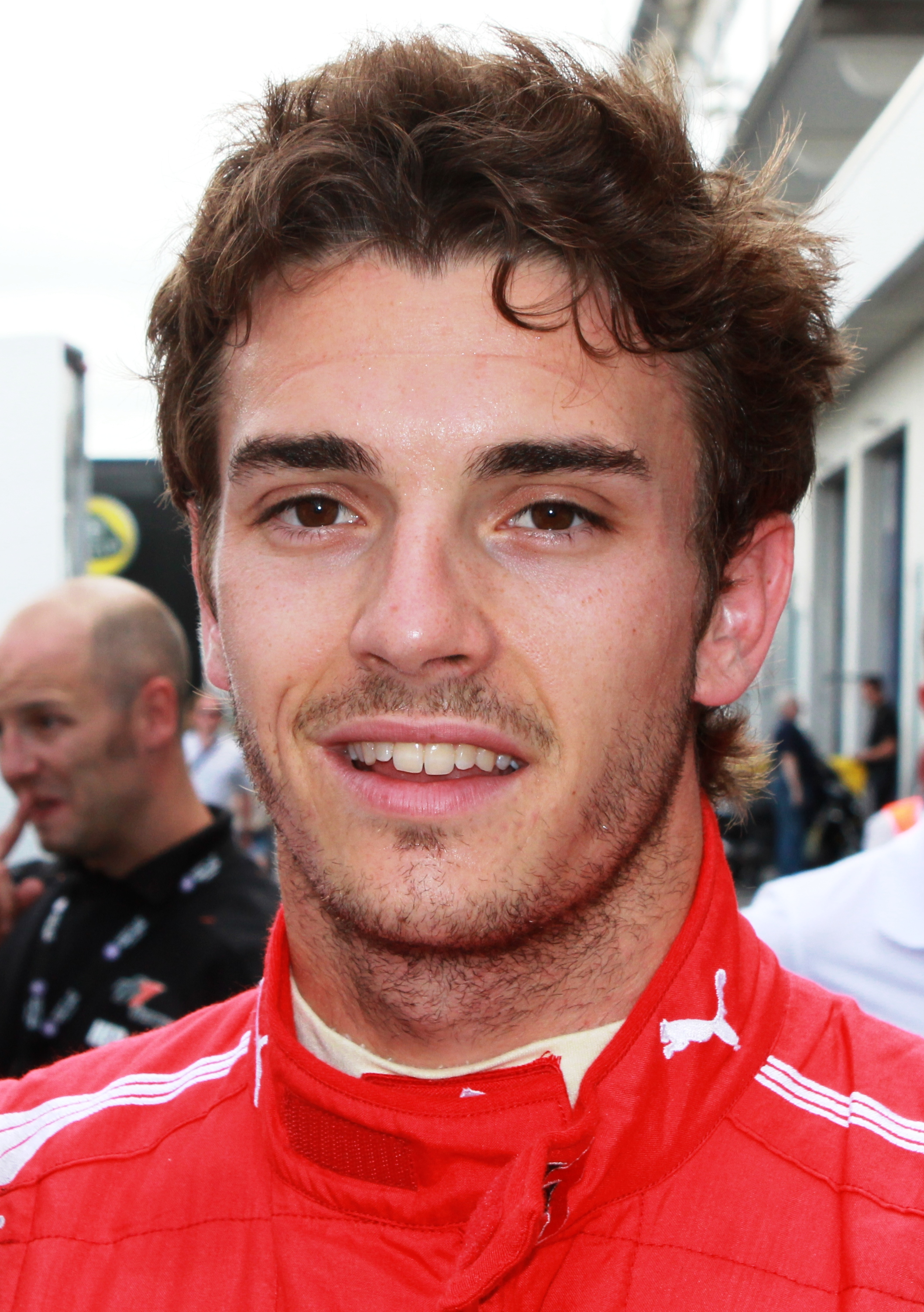
- Bianchi in 2012
- Born: Jules Lucien André Bianchi; 3 August 1989; Nice, Alpes-Maritimes, France
- Died: 17 July 2015 (aged 25); Nice, Alpes-Maritimes, France
- Cause of death: Injuries sustained at the 2014 Japanese Grand Prix
- Relatives: Mauro Bianchi (grandfather); Lucien Bianchi (great-uncle)

Formula One World Championship career
- Nationality: (France) French
- Active years: 2013–2014
- Team: Marussia
- Car number: 17 (retired in honour)
- Entries: 34
- Championships: 0
- Wins: 0
- Podiums: 0
- Career points: 2
- Pole positions: 0
- Fastest laps: 0
- First entry: 2013 Australian Grand Prix
- Last entry: 2014 Japanese Grand Prix

Previous series
- 2009, 2012; 2010–2011; 2009–2011; 2009; 2008–2009; 2007; 2007: Formula Renault 3.5; GP2 Series; GP2 Asia Series; British F3; F3 Euro Series; Formula Renault Eurocup; French Formula Renault

Championship titles
- 2009; 2007: F3 Euro Series; French Formula Renault

Awards
- 2013: Autosport Rookie of the Year

Jules Lucien André Bianchi (French pronunciation: [ʒyl bjɑ̃ki]; 3 August 1989 – 17 July 2015) was a French racing driver who competed in Formula One from 2013 to 2014.

Born and raised in Nice, Bianchi was the grandson of endurance racing driver Mauro Bianchi and the great-nephew of Formula One driver Lucien Bianchi. Graduating from karting to junior formulae in 2007, Bianchi won his first title at the 2007 French Formula Renault 2.0 Championship with SG Formula. After winning the 2008 Masters of Formula 3, Bianchi won the Formula 3 Euro Series in 2009 with ART. He then progressed to the GP2 Series, finishing third in both 2010 and 2011. Bianchi then finished runner-up to Robin Frijns in the 2012 Formula Renault 3.5 Series.

A member of the Ferrari Driver Academy since 2009, Bianchi was a test driver for Ferrari in 2011 and a reserve driver for Force India in 2012. Bianchi signed for Marussia in 2013 alongside Max Chilton, making his Formula One debut at the Australian Grand Prix. Retaining his seat for 2014, Bianchi scored his first championship points at the Monaco Grand Prix—finishing ninth after starting 21st on the grid—earning widespread acclaim from drivers and pundits. (Note: Per several sources:)

During the 2014 Japanese Grand Prix, Bianchi lost control of his Marussia MR03 in very wet conditions and collided with a recovery vehicle, suffering a diffuse axonal injury. He underwent emergency surgery and was placed into an induced coma, remaining comatose until his death nine months later. The number 17 was retired from Formula One in his honour by the FIA, who mandated the halo cockpit protection device in all open-wheel championships from 2018 onwards. As of the 2026 Las Vegas Grand Prix, Bianchi remains the most recent fatality in the Formula One World Championship.

== Early and personal life ==
Jules Bianchi was born in Nice, France, to Philippe and Christine Bianchi. He had two siblings, and was the godfather of future Formula One driver Charles Leclerc.

Bianchi was the grandson of Mauro Bianchi, who competed in GT racing during the 1960s and three non-championship Formula One Grands Prix in 1961. He was also the grandnephew of Lucien Bianchi, who competed in 19 Formula One Grands Prix between 1959 and 1968 and 13 consecutive 24 Hours of Le Mans (1956–1968), finishing 1st in Class three times at Le Mans, including the overall win at the 1968 24 Hours of Le Mans, before dying during Le Mans testing the following year.

Bianchi's favourite racing driver was Michael Schumacher.

== Junior racing career ==
Bianchi's exposure to motorsport started at around three years of age through karting and was facilitated by the fact that his father owned a kart track. Since age 17, Bianchi was professionally managed by Nicolas Todt.

=== Formula Renault 2.0 ===
In 2007, Bianchi left karting and raced in French Formula Renault 2.0 for SG Formula, where he finished as champion with five wins. He also competed in the Formula Renault Eurocup where he had one pole position and one fastest lap in three races.

=== Formula 3 Euro ===
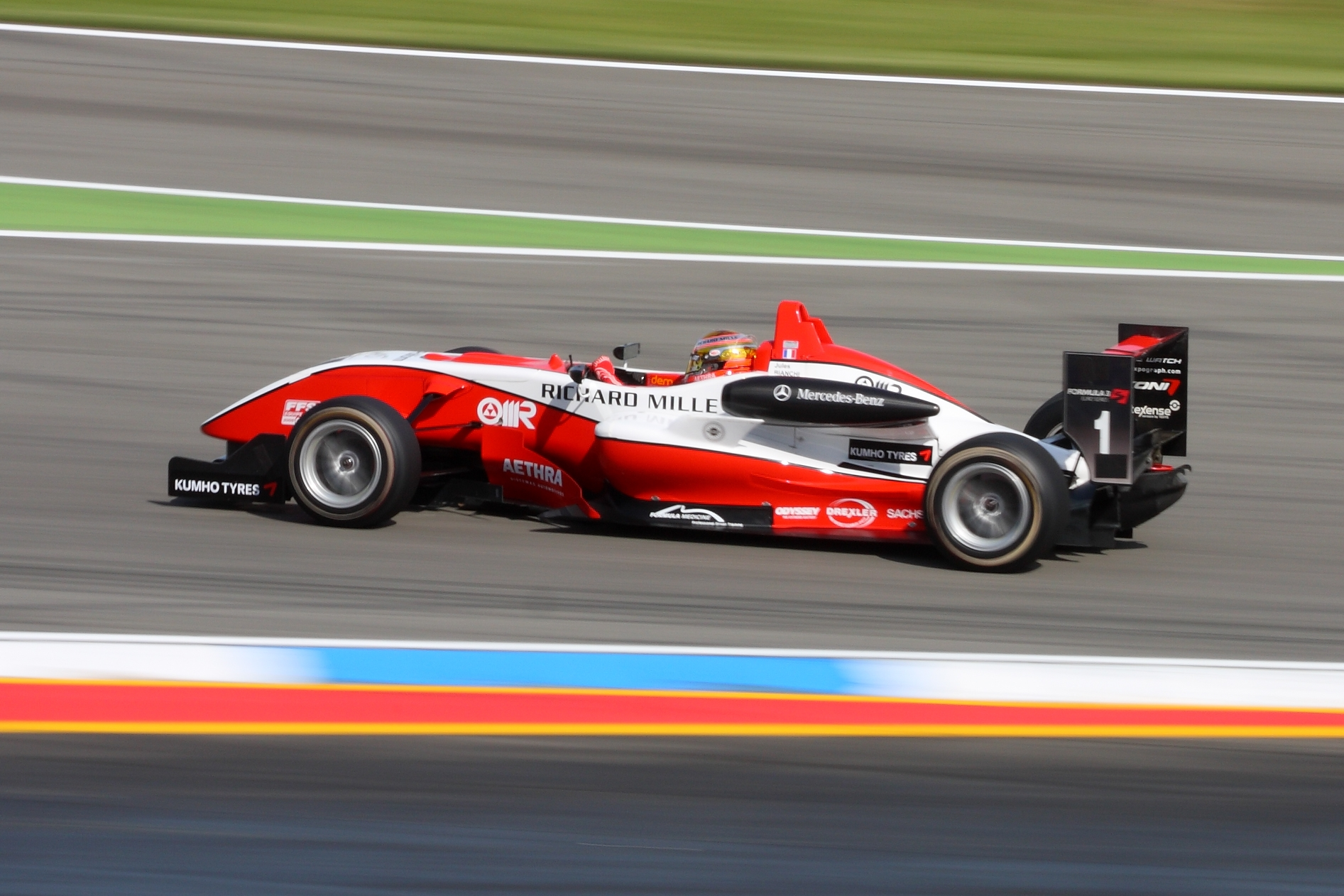
Bianchi during the opening round of the 2009 Formula 3 Euro Series season at Hockenheim

In late 2007, Bianchi signed with ART Grand Prix to compete in the Formula 3 Euro Series.

In 2008, Bianchi won the Masters of Formula 3 at Zolder, and also finished third in the 2008 Formula 3 Euro Series season.

Bianchi continued in the F3 Euroseries in 2009, leading ART's line-up along with rookie team-mates Valtteri Bottas, Esteban Gutiérrez and Adrien Tambay. With eight wins, Bianchi sealed the title with a round to spare, at Dijon-Prenois. He then added a ninth win at the final round at Hockenheim. He also drove in the Formula Renault 3.5 Series at Monaco, after SG Formula acquired the cars formerly run by Kurt Mollekens.

=== GP2 ===
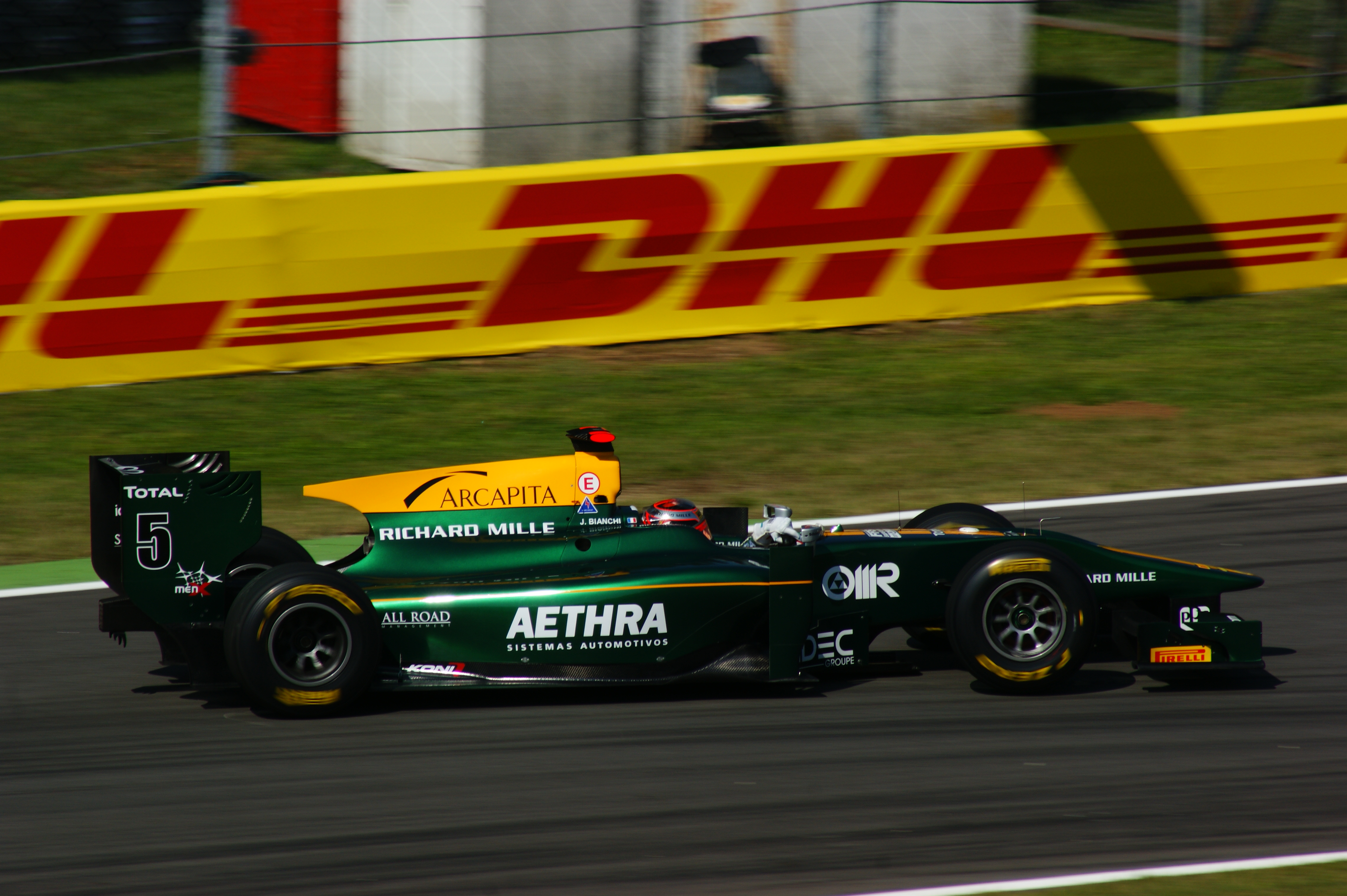
Bianchi at Monza in 2011

Bianchi drove for ART in the subsequent GP2 Asia season and the 2010 GP2 season. He competed in three of the four rounds of the GP2 Asia championship. In the main series, Bianchi took two pole positions and a number of points positions before he was injured in a first-lap crash at the Hungaroring. In the feature race, he spun into the path of the field exiting the first corner, and was struck head-on by Ho-Pin Tung, sustaining a fractured second lumbar vertebra in the process. Bianchi was fourth in the drivers' championship at the time of his injury. Despite initial pessimistic assessments of the severity of his injury, he recovered to take part in the next round of the championship.

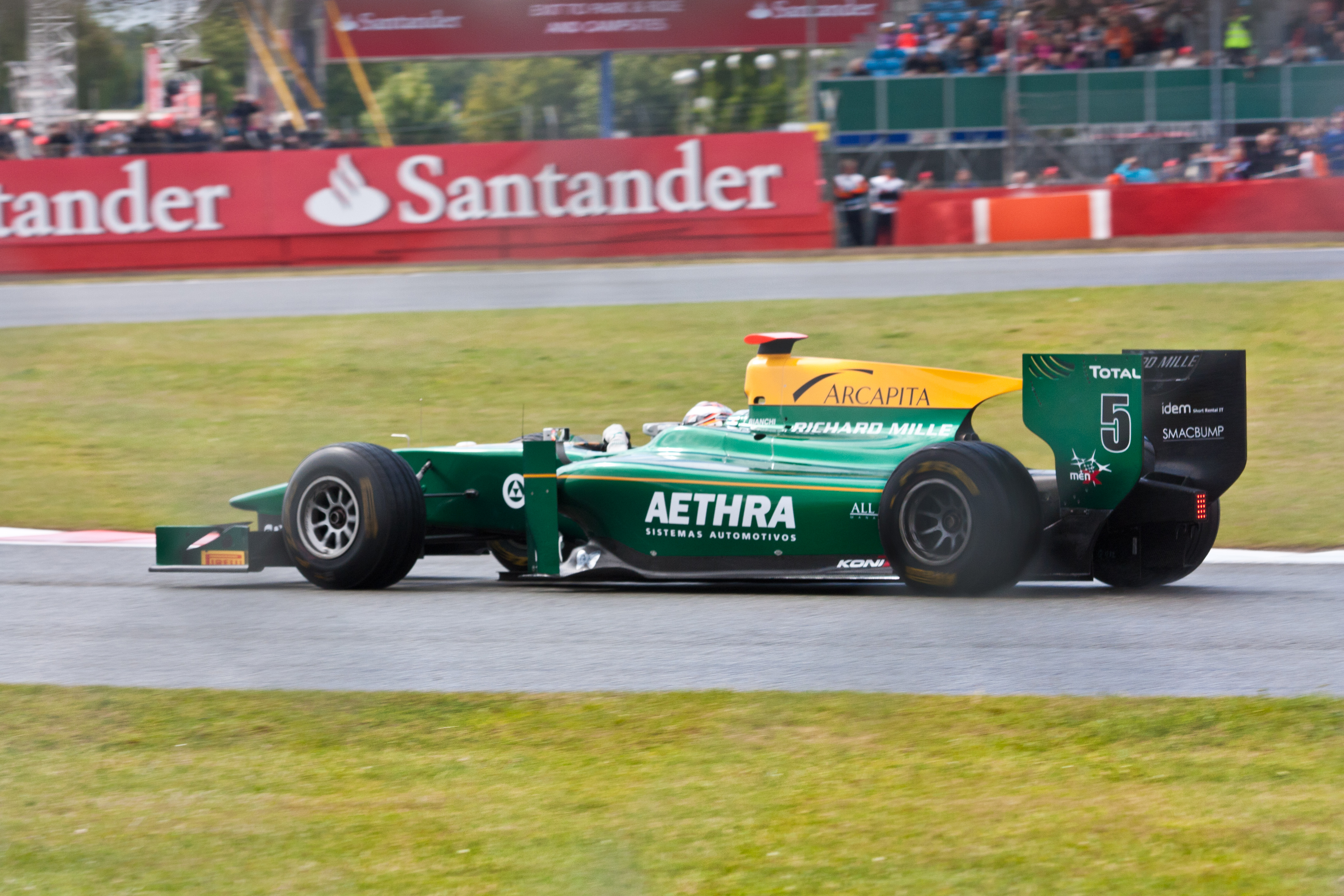
Bianchi driving for Lotus ART during the Silverstone round of the 2011 GP2 season

Bianchi remained with ART for 2011, and was partnered by 2010 GP3 Series champion Esteban Gutiérrez. He starred in the first two rounds of the 2011 GP2 Asia Series, holding off Romain Grosjean for victory in the feature race and gaining fourth in the sprint race, but he was later penalised. He finished runner-up to Grosjean in the drivers' championship. In the main series, Bianchi finished third in the championship, behind Grosjean and Luca Filippi.

=== Formula Renault 3.5 ===
Bianchi opted to switch to the Formula Renault 3.5 Series for 2012, following his one-off appearance in the category in 2009. He signed for the Tech 1 Racing team, and was partnered with Kevin Korjus, and later with Daniel Abt. He finished second in the title race, narrowly losing out to Robin Frijns at the final round.

== Formula One career ==
=== Test driver roles (2009–2012) ===
In August 2009, Bianchi was linked by the BBC and various other media sources to the second Ferrari Formula One seat occupied by Luca Badoer during Felipe Massa's absence. Bianchi tested for Ferrari at the young drivers test at Circuito de Jerez for two of the three days, over 1–2 December 2009. The other drivers tested on 3 December included Daniel Zampieri, Marco Zipoli and Pablo Sánchez López as the top three finishers in the 2009 Italian Formula Three Championship. Bianchi's performance in this test led to him becoming the first recruit of the Ferrari Driver Academy and signing up to a long-term deal to remain at the team's disposal.

On 11 November 2010, Bianchi was confirmed by Ferrari as the team's test and reserve driver for the 2011 season, replacing Luca Badoer, Giancarlo Fisichella and Marc Gené, as well as confirming he would test for the team during the young driver test in Abu Dhabi over 16–17 November. Bianchi carried on his GP2 racing, as Formula 1 allows test and reserve drivers to race in parallel in other competitions. On 13 September 2011, Bianchi tested for Ferrari at Fiorano, as part of the Ferrari Driver Academy, with fellow academy member and Sauber F1 driver Sergio Pérez. Bianchi completed 70 laps and recorded a quickest lap time of 1:00.213. For the 2012 season, Ferrari loaned him to the Sahara Force India team, for whom he drove in nine Friday free practice sessions over the course of the year as the outfit's test and reserve driver.

=== Marussia (2013–2014) ===
==== 2013 ====
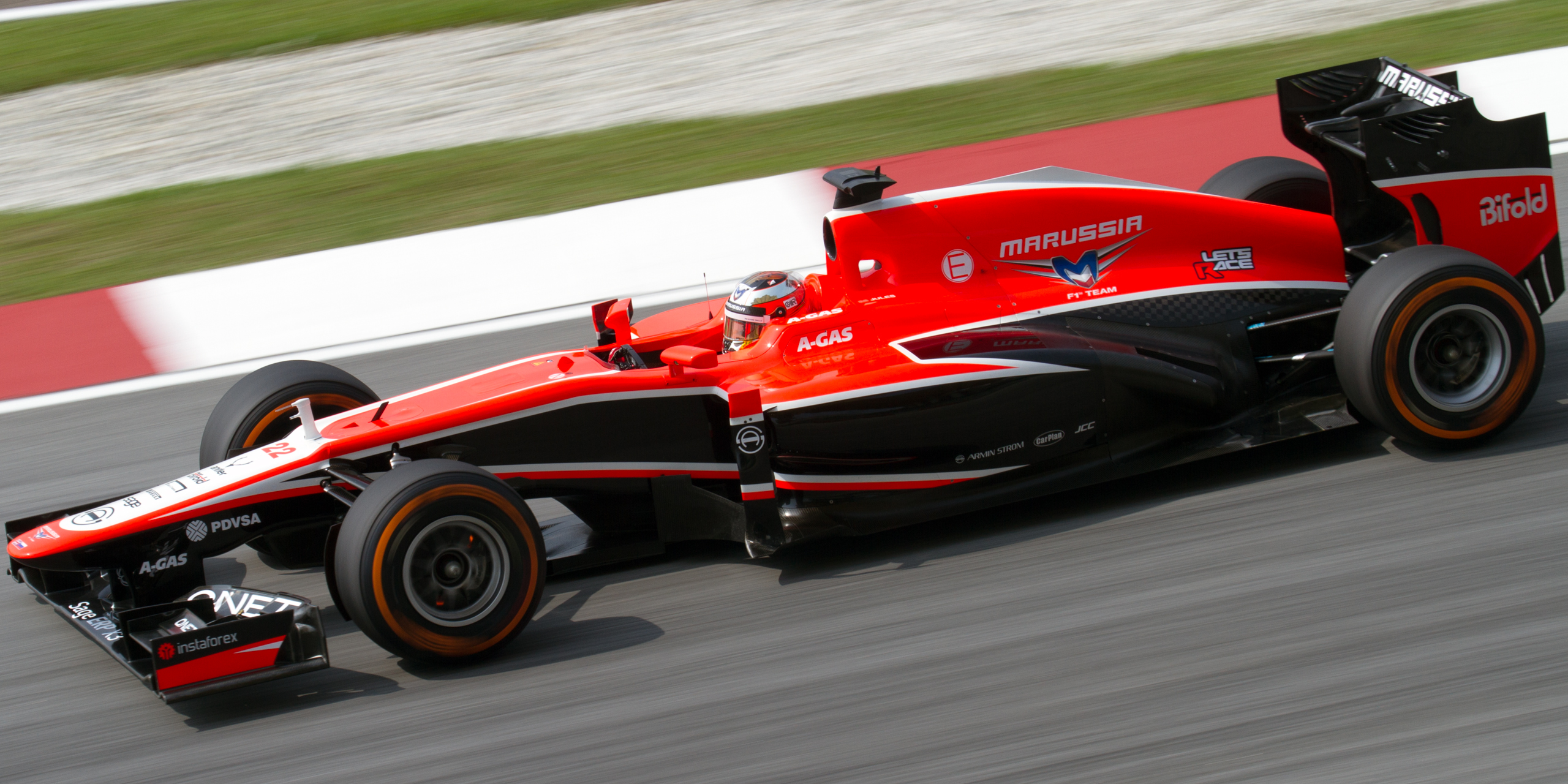
Bianchi driving at the 2013 Malaysian Grand Prix

On 1 March 2013, Marussia announced that Bianchi was to replace Luiz Razia as a race driver after Razia's contract was terminated, due to sponsorship issues. Bianchi qualified 19th for the Australian Grand Prix, out-qualifying team-mate Max Chilton by three-quarters of a second. Bianchi overtook Pastor Maldonado and Daniel Ricciardo on the first lap, and he eventually finished 15th on his debut. He was 19th on the grid again in Malaysia, 0.3 seconds away from Q2. Bianchi fell behind the Caterhams at the start of the race, but moved up the order after the pit stops, eventually going on to finish 13th, ahead of his teammate, and both Caterhams. As of the Hungarian Grand Prix, Bianchi had beaten his teammate in all qualifying sessions and all races that both of them had finished. In the Japanese Grand Prix he and Charles Pic of Caterham were given ten-place grid penalties for receiving three reprimands over the season, and at the race, his race ended early after a collision with Giedo van der Garde.

==== 2014 ====
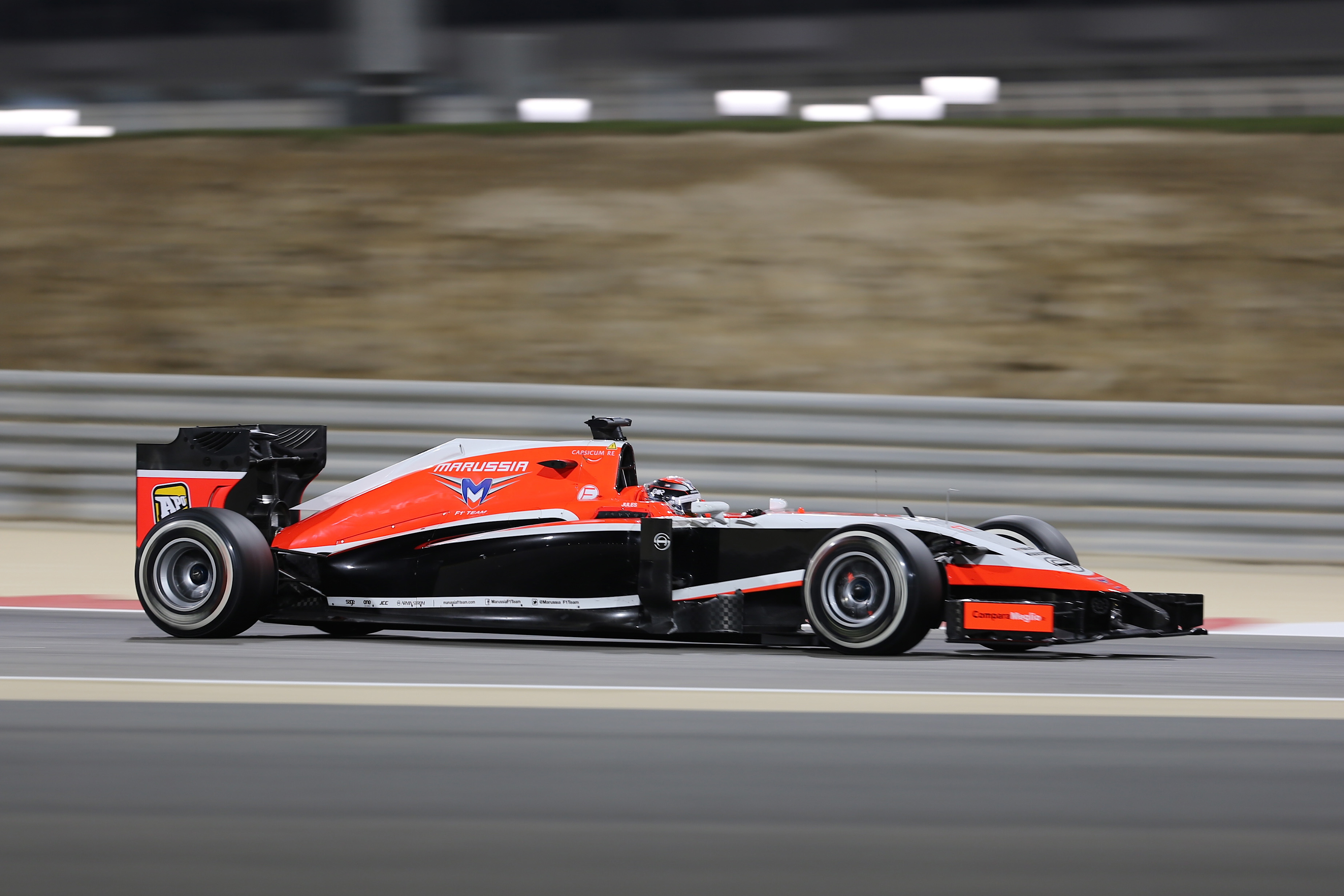
Bianchi driving the Marussia MR03 at the 2014 Bahrain Grand Prix

In October 2013, Marussia confirmed that Bianchi would stay at the team for the following season. After starting off the season with struggles in Australia, in which he was not classified, Bianchi overcame the odds to score his – and his team's – first World Championship points by finishing ninth at the Monaco Grand Prix.

Out of the nine races which Bianchi and Chilton completed without retiring, during the 2014 season, he was the quicker driver in eight of them, establishing his status as the first driver. Chilton retired twice, and Bianchi five times, with three of Bianchi's retirements being mechanical failures.

Days before his fatal accident, Bianchi declared himself "ready" to step into the Scuderia Ferrari race seat should the team need him amid the looming departure of Fernando Alonso.

== 2014 Suzuka accident ==
The 2014 Japanese Grand Prix was held at the Suzuka Circuit on 5 October, under intermittent heavy rainfall caused by the approaching Typhoon Phanfone and in fading daylight.

On lap 42 of the scheduled 53-lap race, Adrian Sutil's Sauber spun out of control and crashed in the run-off area on the outside of the Dunlop Curve (turn seven). On lap 43, Bianchi did not slow down enough to avoid losing control while approaching the double waved yellow flags near the Dunlop Curve, lost control of his car, and veered right – directly towards the same spot where the Sauber had stopped. Bianchi collided with the rear of a wheel loader that was tending to the removal of Sutil's car. Spectators' video footage and photographs of the accident revealed that the left side of Bianchi's Marussia car was extensively damaged and the roll bar destroyed as it slid under the wheel loader. The impact was such that the wheel loader was partially jolted off the ground, causing Sutil's Sauber, which was suspended in the air by the crane, to fall back to the ground. The race was stopped on lap 44, and Lewis Hamilton was declared the winner.

Bianchi was reported as being unconscious after not responding to either a team radio call or marshals. He was treated at the crash site before being taken by ambulance to the circuit's medical centre. Since transport by helicopter was not possible due to poor weather conditions, Bianchi was further transported by ambulance, for 32 minutes under police escort. The destination was the nearest hospital, Mie Prefectural General Medical Center in Yokkaichi, which was 15 km (9.3 mi) away from the Suzuka circuit. Initial reports by his father to television channel France 3, were that Bianchi was in critical condition with a head injury and was undergoing an operation to reduce severe bruising to his head. The FIA subsequently said that CT scans showed Bianchi suffered a "severe head injury" in the crash, and that he would be admitted to intensive care following surgery.

Among his first hospital visitors immediately after the Grand Prix were Marussia's CEO Graeme Lowdon and team principal John Booth (the latter staying by Bianchi's side even after the inaugural Russian Grand Prix), as well as Ferrari's team principal Marco Mattiacci and fellow driver Felipe Massa.

Bianchi's parents arrived on 6 October and were joined, three days later, by their other children as well as Bianchi's best friend Lorenzo Leclerc, the older brother of his godson Charles. The family released a statement the next day, expressing appreciation for the outpouring of support from the public and for the presence of Professor Gerard Saillant, president of the FIA Medical Commission, and Professor Alessandro Frati, neurosurgeon of the Sapienza University of Rome, who travelled to Japan at the request of Scuderia Ferrari. They also provided a medical update, confirming that the injury suffered was a diffuse axonal injury and that Bianchi was in a critical but stable condition.

Initial media reports in October 2014—said to be based on information obtained from Fédération Internationale de l'Automobile (FIA) documents—claimed that the speed at the moment of loss of control was recorded at 212 km/h (132 mph) and that the impact generated 92 g_{0} (900 m/s^{2}). This data had been sourced from Bianchi's g-sensors in his earplugs; however, it was understood that these slipped out at a crucial moment.

Subsequent calculations in July 2015 indicated a peak of 254 g_{0} (2,490 m/s^{2}) and data from the FIA's World Accident Database (WADB)—which sources information from racing accidents worldwide—also indicate Bianchi's impact occurred 2.61 seconds after the loss of control, at a speed of 123 km/h (76 mph) and at an angle of 55 degrees. According to Andy Mellor, Vice President of the FIA Safety Commission, this is the equivalent of "dropping a car 48 metres (157 ft) to the ground without a crumple zone".

=== Team and driver reactions ===
At the inaugural Russian Grand Prix, one week after the accident, Marussia originally registered Alexander Rossi in place of the hospitalised Bianchi, before finally deciding to field only a single car driven by Max Chilton.

There were several tributes at the race to show support for Bianchi:

- Marussia adopted a "#JB17" livery on the cockpit sides of its MR03 car (which continued to be used in the subsequent year).
- Every driver wore a sticker on their helmet saying "Tous avec Jules #17" ("We're all with Jules #17"), an idea championed by fellow French driver, Jean-Éric Vergne.
- The drivers held a one-minute silence in honour of Bianchi just before the next race.
- The race winner, Lewis Hamilton, dedicated his win to Bianchi.

The day after the Japanese Grand Prix, then-outgoing Ferrari president, Luca di Montezemolo, disclosed to the media that Bianchi had been poised to become the third Ferrari driver in 2015 if the championship moved to three-car teams, as had widely been speculated at the time.

Following the Russian Grand Prix, Marussia's CEO Graeme Lowdon confirmed that the team would return to a two-car operation for the remainder of the season, however, the team entered administration prior to the next race, the United States Grand Prix. The team's financial backer, Andrei Cheglakov, later revealed that Bianchi's crash was a key factor in the Russian's decision to end his financial support of the team and quit Formula One.

After the 2015 Australian Grand Prix in March, John Booth, now team principal of the newly established Manor Marussia F1 team, paid tribute to Bianchi's point performance at the 2014 Monaco Grand Prix since the prize money won enabled the team to stay in Formula One. In addition, coinciding with the Monaco Grand Prix, Manor Marussia continued to show support for Bianchi with special red wristbands inscribed with "Monaco 2014 P8 JB17".

=== FIA reaction and investigation ===
Following Bianchi's accident, the FIA began an investigation and also considered appropriate changes to safety procedures, such as those at the Brazilian Grand Prix, where the location of a tractor crane serving the Senna S chicane was altered.

The FIA released its initial findings at a special conference held during the inaugural Russian Grand Prix on the Saturday after the Japanese Grand Prix weekend. Among other things, it was revealed that Bianchi had slowed down at Suzuka's Turn 7, but without disclosing by what margin or the speed of impact, and that the journey to the hospital by ambulance took only an extra 37 minutes relative to the helicopter, without any adverse effects on Bianchi's condition.

Further, the FIA confirmed ongoing research into closed cockpits for Formula One cars, the possibility of fitting protective skirting to all recovery vehicles, as well as ways to slow down cars in crash zones more effectively than double yellow flags. With respect to the latter, the FIA moved to quickly consider the introduction of a virtual safety car – or VSC system – which was then tested during the season's final three Grands Prix in the United States, Brazil and Abu Dhabi – based on a Le Mans racing "slow zone" arrangement that does not neutralise race proceedings as much as safety car periods.

The following week, the FIA reportedly emailed all teams to request that they retain any information related to Bianchi's Suzuka accident, for exclusive use by an accident panel established by the FIA to investigate Bianchi's accident.

One week later the FIA announced a review panel to investigate the cause of the accident, which was made up of former drivers and team principals, and published its findings four weeks later. The report found that there was no single cause of Bianchi's accident. Instead, the contributing factors were found to include track conditions, car speed and the presence of a recovery vehicle on the circuit. The report also made several suggestions to improve safety when recovering stricken vehicles — which were subsequently introduced for the 2015 season — before concluding that it would not have been possible to mitigate Bianchi's injuries through changes to the cockpit design. The report also revealed that Bianchi pressed both the throttle and brake which should shut off power to the engine. However, Marussia's uniquely designed brake-by-wire system was found to be incompatible with the FailSafe so the engine was not shut off. Despite this, Marussia was not found to be responsible for the accident.

For the 2015 season, on safety grounds, the FIA also implemented measures requiring that no race can start less than 4 hours before sunset or dusk, except in the case of official night races. The revised regulations affected the start time of Australian, Malaysian, Chinese, Japanese and Russian Grands Prix.

In July 2015, Peter Wright, the chairman of the FIA Safety Commission, was quoted as saying that a closed cockpit would not have averted Bianchi's head injuries, while the Vice President, Andy Mellow, also confirmed that attaching impact protection to recovery vehicles was not a feasible solution.

=== Medical treatment and updates ===
The first family update following Bianchi's emergency surgery was made by his father in the week beginning 13 October 2014. Bianchi was reported to be in a "desperate" condition, with doctors describing his survival as a miracle. Even so, the father openly stated that he drew hope from Michael Schumacher waking from his coma. Marussia also issued regular updates on Bianchi's condition while rejecting initial speculation about their role in the accident.

While hospitalised in Yokkaichi, Bianchi remained in a critical but stable condition, and required a medical ventilator. He was taken out of his artificial coma in November 2014 and began breathing unaided, making his relocation to France for admission at the Centre Hospitalier Universitaire de Nice (CHU) possible. There, Bianchi remained unconscious and in a critical condition but more accessible to his family for their daily vigil. On 13 July 2015, Bianchi's father publicly conceded becoming "less optimistic" as a consequence of no significant progress and the lapse of time since the accident.

== Death ==
Bianchi died on 17 July 2015, aged 25, from injuries sustained at the time of his accident in Suzuka nine months earlier, where he lost control of his Marussia MR03 in very wet conditions and collided with a recovery vehicle, suffering a diffuse axonal injury. He underwent emergency surgery and was placed into an induced coma, remaining comatose until his death. His death made him the first Formula One driver to be killed by injuries sustained during a Grand Prix since Ayrton Senna in 1994.

In their official statement, Bianchi's family said:

It is with deep sadness that the parents of Jules Bianchi, Philippe and Christine, his brother Tom and sister Mélanie, wish to make it known that Jules passed away last night at the Centre Hospitalier Universitaire in Nice. Jules fought to the end, as he has always done, but yesterday his battle ended. We feel an immense and indescribable pain.

The funeral service was held at the Nice Cathedral, on 21 July 2015. He was subsequently cremated and his ashes rest at Monte Carlo Cemetery and partially floated into the Mediterranean Sea. Many current, former, and future drivers attended Bianchi's funeral, including Alexander Wurz, Esteban Gutiérrez, Allan McNish, Alexander Rossi, Lewis Hamilton, Charles Leclerc, Nico Rosberg, Jenson Button, Sebastian Vettel, Jean-Éric Vergne, Marcus Ericsson, Roberto Merhi, Adrian Sutil, Valtteri Bottas, Pastor Maldonado, Pedro de la Rosa, Romain Grosjean, Daniel Ricciardo, Felipe Massa, Alain Prost, Nico Hülkenberg, Olivier Panis, Daniil Kvyat, and Max Chilton.

In May 2016, it was announced that Bianchi's family planned to take legal action against the FIA, Bianchi's Marussia team, and Bernie Ecclestone's Formula One Group.

=== Tributes and legacy ===
Widespread tributes followed from fellow past and present drivers, Bernie Ecclestone, French president François Hollande, and other sports personalities. The Manor Marussia team also published a statement on their Facebook page describing Bianchi as, among other things, "a magnificent human being" and a "shining talent".

The Grand Prix Drivers' Association announced that it felt a responsibility "to never relent in improving safety". FIA president Jean Todt also announced that race number 17 would be retired from the list of those available for Formula One drivers, as a mark of respect. In paying his respects, Ferrari chairman Luca di Montezemolo also stated that, owing to his GP2 experience, strong performances with Marussia and test sessions with Ferrari, Bianchi was the designated replacement for Kimi Räikkönen at Scuderia Ferrari.

Max Chilton dedicated his maiden Indy Lights pole position and race win to Bianchi, which he achieved on the same weekend as Bianchi's death. A minute's silence was observed before the start of the 2015 Hungarian Grand Prix in Bianchi's honour, in the presence of his family. Commemorative stickers on helmets and cars were other tributes at that race. Sebastian Vettel dedicated his win at the Grand Prix to Bianchi and his family, acknowledging that the Frenchman would have been a part of the team in the future. Daniil Kvyat also dedicated his maiden podium finish to Bianchi, along with the third-placed Daniel Ricciardo.

Rue du Sapin, the street address of the Allianz Riviera stadium, home of association football club OGC Nice, was renamed Rue Jules Bianchi in Bianchi's honour in 2016.

Bianchi's godson, Charles Leclerc, wore a tribute helmet to Bianchi at the 2019 Monaco Grand Prix, with Bianchi's helmet design on one side and his father, Herve Leclerc's, on the other side. He used a full tribute design to Bianchi at the 2024 Japanese Grand Prix, in memory of the ten year anniversary of his accident.

==== Safety reforms ====
From 2018 onwards, the FIA mandated the halo cockpit protection device in all FIA open-wheel championships, a curved titanium bar designed to protect the driver's head from serious trauma, and prevent similar accidents to Bianchi's.

At the 2020 Bahrain Grand Prix, Romain Grosjean was involved in a major accident which saw his car break in half and catch fire. Grosjean credited the safety changes brought on by Bianchi's fatal crash with saving his life. As of the 2026 Las Vegas Grand Prix, Bianchi remains the most recent fatality in the Formula One World Championship.

=== Foundation ===
In December 2015, Bianchi's father announced plans to create a foundation in his son's honour to uncover and nurture young drivers throughout their careers. The initiative involves exhibiting Jules Bianchi's memorabilia (from go-karts and single-seaters to personal pictures and videos) and merchandising with JB17 branding, sponsoring opportunities and events. Among the supporters is Prince Albert of Monaco, where the foundation is based.

== In popular culture ==
French musician Benjamin Biolay composed a song titled "Grand Prix", part of an album of the same name, with lyrics that describe Bianchi's accident and death. At the 2021 Victoires de la Musique, the album won the award for Best Album.

Bianchi also appeared as an extra in the Formula E docudrama film titled And We Go Green, produced by Leonardo DiCaprio, using archived video footage of him from when he was alive. The film was released in 2020.

== Karting record ==
=== Karting career summary ===
Season	Series	Team	Position
2002	Monaco Kart Cup — ICA Junior	Maranello Kart	23rd
2002	Grand Prix Karting FFSA — Junior		11th
2002	Trophée des Jeunes FFSA — Cadets		3rd
2003	CIK-FIA European Championship Western Region Qualification — ICA Junior	Maranello Kart	2nd
2003	CIK-FIA European Championship — ICA Junior	Maranello Kart	18th
2003	Andrea Margutti Trophy — ICA Junior	Maranello Kart	3rd
2003	Grand Prix Karting FFSA — Junior		5th
2003	Italian Open Masters — ICA Junior		15th
2003	South Garda Winter Cup — 100 Junior		4th
2004	CIK-FIA European Championship — ICA Junior	Intrepid Kart Technology	2nd
2004	Andrea Margutti Trophy — ICA Junior	Intrepid Kart Technology	3rd
2004	Italian Open Masters — ICA Junior		8th
2004	Grand Prix Karting FFSA — Junior		2nd
2004	Copa Campeones — ICA		2nd
2005	CIK-FIA World Championship — Formula A	Maranello Kart	4th
2005	Asia-Pacific Championship — Formula A	Maranello Kart	1st
2005	CIK-FIA European Championship — Formula A		25th
2005	Italian Open Masters — Formula A		18th
2005	Andrea Margutti Trophy — Formula A		31st
2005	Copa Campeones — ICA		1st
2005	South Garda Winter Cup — Formula A		26th
2006	Andrea Margutti Trophy — Formula A	Maranello Kart	5th
2006	CIK-FIA European Championship — Formula A	Maranello Kart	5th
2006	CIK-FIA World Cup — Formula A	Maranello Kart	2nd
2006	CIK-FIA World Cup — Super ICC	Maranello Kart	6th
2006	CIK-FIA World Championship — Formula A	Maranello Kart	26th
2006	WSK International Series — ICC	Maranello Kart	1st
2006	South Garda Winter Cup — Formula A		2nd
2006	Italian Open Masters — Formula A		3rd
2006	WSK International Series — Formula A		14th
2006	Championnat de France — Elite		13th
2011	Desafio Internacional das Estrelas		5th
2011	Masters of Paris-Bercy — Stars		N/A
2012	Desafio Internacional das Estrelas		1st
2013	Desafio Internacional das Estrelas		1st

== Racing record ==
=== Career summary ===
Season	Series	Team	Races	Wins	Poles	F/Laps	Podiums	Points	Position
2007	French Formula Renault 2.0	SG Formula	13	5	5	10	11	172	**1st**
2007	Eurocup Formula Renault 2.0	SG Formula	6	0	1	1	0	4	22nd
2008	Formula 3 Euro Series	ART Grand Prix	20	2	2	2	7	47	**3rd**
2008	Macau Grand Prix	ART Grand Prix	1	0	0	0	0	N/A	9th
2008	Masters of Formula 3	ART Grand Prix	1	1	0	0	1	N/A	**1st**
2009	Formula 3 Euro Series	ART Grand Prix	20	9	6	7	12	114	**1st**
2009	British Formula 3 Championship	ART Grand Prix	4	2	2	2	3	0	NC^{†}
2009	Macau Grand Prix	ART Grand Prix	1	0	0	0	0	N/A	10th
2009	Formula Renault 3.5 Series	SG Formula	1	0	0	0	0	0	NC
2009–10	GP2 Asia Series	ART Grand Prix	6	0	1	2	1	8	12th
2010	GP2 Series	ART Grand Prix	20	0	3	1	4	52	**3rd**
2011	GP2 Series	Lotus ART	18	1	1	0	6	53	**3rd**
2011	GP2 Asia Series	Lotus ART	4	1	0	1	2	18	**2nd**
2011	Formula One	Scuderia Ferrari	Test driver						
2012	Formula Renault 3.5 Series	Tech 1 Racing	17	3	5	7	8	185	**2nd**
2012	Formula One	Sahara Force India F1 Team	Reserve driver						
2013	Formula One	Marussia F1 Team	19	0	0	0	0	0	19th
2014	Formula One	Marussia F1 Team	15	0	0	0	0	2	17th

^{†} Bianchi was a guest driver, therefore ineligible to score points.

=== Complete French Formula Renault 2.0 results ===
(key) (Races in bold indicate pole position; races in italics indicate fastest lap)

Year	Entrant	1	2	3	4	5	6	7	8	9	10	11	12	13	DC	Points
2007	SG Formula	NOG; 1; 2	NOG; 2; 3	**LED**; **1**; 1	**LED**; **2**; 1	DIJ; 1; 4	**DIJ**; **2**; 1	VDV; 1; 2	VDV; 2; 2	MAG1; 3	**MAG2**; **1**; 1	MAG2; 2; 5	**CAT**; **1**; 1	CAT; 2; 3	1st	172

=== Complete Eurocup Formula Renault 2.0 results ===
(key) (Races in bold indicate pole position; races in italics indicate fastest lap)

Year	Entrant	1	2	3	4	5	6	7	8	9	10	11	12	13	14	DC	Points
2007	SG Formula	ZOL; 1	ZOL; 2	NÜR; 1 NC	NÜR; 2 Ret	**HUN**; **1** Ret	HUN; 2; 30	DON; 1	DON; 2	MAG; 1	MAG; 2	EST; 1	EST; 2	CAT; 1 Ret	CAT; 2; 9	21st	4

=== Complete Formula 3 Euro Series results ===
(key) (Races in bold indicate pole position; races in italics indicate fastest lap)

Year	Entrant	Chassis	Engine	1	2	3	4	5	6	7	8	9	10	11	12	13	14	15	16	17	18	19	20	DC	Points
2008	ART Grand Prix	Dallara F308/049	Mercedes	HOC; 1 Ret	HOC; 2; 13	MUG; 1; 3	MUG; 2; 4	PAU; 1 Ret	PAU; 2; 26	NOR; 1 Ret	NOR; 2; 9	ZAN; 1; 3	ZAN; 2; 9	NÜR; 1; 2	NÜR; 2; 3	**BRH**; **1**; 22	BRH; 2; 18	CAT; 1 Ret	CAT; 2; 3	**BUG**; **1**; 1	BUG; 2; 17	HOC; 1; 7	HOC; 2; 1	**3rd**	**47**
2009	ART Grand Prix	Dallara F308	Mercedes	HOC; 1; 5	HOC; 2; 3	MUG; 1; 1	MUG; 2; 14	PAU; 1; 1	PAU; 2; 3	**NOR**; **1**; 1	NOR; 2; 1	**ZAN**; **1**; 1	ZAN; 2; 6	**NÜR**; **1**; 1	NÜR; 2; 5	BRH; 1 Ret	BRH; 2 Ret	**CAT**; **1**; 1	CAT; 2; 5	**DIJ**; **1**; 2	DIJ; 2; 1	**HOC**; **1**; 1	HOC; 2; 7	**1st**	**114**

=== Complete Formula Renault 3.5 Series results ===
(key) (Races in bold indicate pole position; races in italics indicate fastest lap)

Year	Team	1	2	3	4	5	6	7	8	9	10	11	12	13	14	15	16	17	Pos	Points
2009	KMP Group/SG Formula	CAT; 1	CAT; 2	SPA; 1	SPA; 2	MON; 1 Ret	HUN; 1	HUN; 2	SIL; 1	SIL; 2	BUG; 1	BUG; 2	ALG; 1	ALG; 2	NÜR; 1	NÜR; 2	ALC; 1	ALC; 2	NC	0
2012	Tech 1 Racing	ALC; 1 DSQ	ALC; 2; 13	MON; 1; 2	SPA; 1; 2	SPA; 2; 17	**NÜR**; **1**; 1	NÜR; 2; 12	MSC; 1; 2	**MSC**; **2**; 7	SIL; 1; 1	**SIL**; **2**; 3	HUN; 1; 3	HUN; 2; 9	LEC; 1; 4	**LEC**; **2**; 1	**CAT**; **1**; 7	CAT; 2 Ret	**2nd**	**185**

=== Complete GP2 Series results ===
(key) (Races in bold indicate pole position; races in italics indicate fastest lap)

Year	Entrant	1	2	3	4	5	6	7	8	9	10	11	12	13	14	15	16	17	18	19	20	DC	Points
2010	ART Grand Prix	**CAT**; **FEA**; Ret	CAT; SPR; 12	MON; FEA; 4	MON; SPR; 3	IST; FEA; Ret	IST; SPR; 13	VAL; FEA; 2	VAL; SPR; Ret	**SIL**; **FEA**; 2	SIL; SPR; 5	HOC; FEA; 5	HOC; SPR; 4	HUN; FEA; Ret	HUN; SPR; DNS	SPA; FEA; 14	SPA; SPR; Ret	**MNZ**; **FEA**; 2	MNZ; SPR; 4	YMC; FEA; 18	YMC; SPR; 7	**3rd**	**52**
2011	Lotus ART	IST; FEA; 3	IST; SPR; 7	CAT; FEA; 7	CAT; SPR; Ret	MON; FEA; Ret	MON; SPR; 19	VAL; FEA; Ret	VAL; SPR; 7	**SIL**; **FEA**; 1	SIL; SPR; 5	NÜR; FEA; 4	NÜR; SPR; 2	HUN; FEA; 7	HUN; SPR; 6	SPA; FEA; 2	SPA; SPR; 2	MNZ; FEA; 8	MNZ; SPR; 3			**3rd**	**53**

==== Complete GP2 Asia Series results ====
(key) (Races in bold indicate pole position; races in italics indicate fastest lap)

Year	Entrant	1	2	3	4	5	6	7	8	DC	Points
2009–10	ART Grand Prix	YMC1; FEA	YMC1; SPR	YMC2; FEA; 3	YMC2; SPR; 7	**BHR1**; **FEA**; 10	BHR1; SPR; NC	BHR2; FEA; 10	BHR2; SPR; Ret	12th	8
2011	Lotus ART	YMC; FEA; 1	YMC; SPR; 8	IMO; FEA; 3	IMO; SPR; Ret					**2nd**	**18**

=== Complete Formula One results ===
(key) (Races in bold indicate pole position; races in italics indicates fastest lap)

Year	Entrant	Chassis	Engine	1	2	3	4	5	6	7	8	9	10	11	12	13	14	15	16	17	18	19	20	WDC	Points
2012	Sahara Force India F1 Team	Force India VJM05	Mercedes FO 108Z 2.4 V8	AUS	MAL	CHN; TD	BHR	ESP; TD	MON	CAN	EUR; TD	GBR; TD	GER; TD	HUN; TD	BEL	ITA; TD	SIN	JPN	KOR; TD	IND	ABU; TD	USA	BRA	–	–
2013	Marussia F1 Team	Marussia MR02	Cosworth CA2013 2.4 V8	AUS; 15	MAL; 13	CHN; 15	BHR; 19	ESP; 18	MON; Ret	CAN; 17	GBR; 16	GER; Ret	HUN; 16	BEL; 18	ITA; 19	SIN; 18	KOR; 16	JPN; Ret	IND; 18	ABU; 20	USA; 18	BRA; 17		19th	0
2014	Marussia F1 Team	Marussia MR03	Ferrari 059/3 1.6 V6 t	AUS; NC	MAL; Ret	BHR; 16	CHN; 17	ESP; 18	MON; 9	CAN; Ret	AUT; 15	GBR; 14	GER; 15	HUN; 15	BEL; 18†	ITA; 18	SIN; 16	JPN; 20†	RUS	USA	BRA	ABU		17th	2

^{†} Driver did not finish the Grand Prix, but was classified as he completed over 90% of the race distance.

== Notes ==
Sporting positions
Preceded by Laurent Groppi	French Formula Renault 2.0; Champion; 2007	Succeeded by Daniel Ricciardo (2008 Formula Renault; West European Cup)
Preceded by Nico Hülkenberg	Formula Three Masters; Winner; 2008	Succeeded by Valtteri Bottas
Preceded by Nico Hülkenberg	Formula 3 Euro Series; Champion; 2009	Succeeded by Edoardo Mortara
Preceded by Jaime Alguersuari (2011)	Desafio Internacional das Estrelas; Winner; 2013	Succeeded by Vitantonio Liuzzi
Preceded by Ayrton Senna	Formula One fatal accidents 5 October 2014 (Date of accident); 17 July 2015 (Date of death)	Most recent F1 fatal accident to date
Awards
Preceded by Mathéo Tuscher	Autosport Awards; Rookie of the Year; 2013	Succeeded by Daniil Kvyat
