= 2007 Championnat de France Formula Renault 2.0 =

Motor racing competition

Seasons
- ← 2006 2008 →

The 2007 Championnat de France Formula Renault 2.0 season was the last of the French Formula Renault championship as independent series. It was included in 2008 in the Formula Renault 2.0 West European Cup. The last round of the French championship was held out of France, in the Circuit de Catalunya, Barcelona as symbol of the series mutations that expand to Western Europe (Portugal, Spain, France and Belgium) in 2008.

Jules Bianchi would win the championship for SG Formula.

== Teams and drivers ==
Team	No.	Driver	Rounds
(France) SG Formula	1	(France) Nelson Panciatici	1–3
(France) SG Formula	2	(France) Charles Pic	All
(France) SG Formula	3	(United Kingdom) Jon Lancaster	2–7
(France) SG Formula	4	(France) Alexandre Marsoin	All
(France) SG Formula	5	(France) Edouard Texte	1–2, 4–5
(France) SG Formula	6	(France) Jules Bianchi	All
(France) Graff Racing	7	(Switzerland) Gary Hirsch	All
(France) Graff Racing	8	(France) Kévin Estre	All
(France) Graff Racing	9	(France) Tristan Vautier	All
(France) Graff Racing	10	(France) Benjamin Lariche	All
(France) Graff Racing	11	(France) Bastien Borget	All
(France) Graff Racing	16	(France) Pierre Combot	6
(France) Epsilon Support	12	(France) Nelson Lukes	All
(France) Epsilon Support	14	(France) Mathieu Arzeno	4–7
(France) Epsilon Support	27	(United Kingdom) Craig Dolby	All
(France) Epsilon Support	36	(France) Sébastien Chardonnet	All
(France) Pole Services	14	(France) Mathieu Arzeno	1–3
(France) Pole Services	15	(France) Nicolas Marroc	1–5, 7
(France) Pole Services	16	(France) Pierre Combot	1–5, 7
(France) Pole Services	17	(France) Kévin Van Heek	1
(France) Pole Services	19	(United Kingdom) Alexander Sims	2–3
(France) Pole Services	34	(France) Stéphane Panepinto	4–5
(France) TCS Racing	15	(France) Nicolas Marroc	6
(United Kingdom) Manor Motorsport	19	(United Kingdom) Alexander Sims	4–5, 7
(United Kingdom) Manor Motorsport	22	(United Kingdom) Alex Morgan	5
(Belgium) Boutsen Energy Racing	20	(Switzerland) Jonathan Hirschi	3
(Belgium) Boutsen Energy Racing	21	(Belgium) Maxime Martin	3
(United Kingdom) Fortec Motorsports	22	(United Kingdom) Alex Morgan	7
(United Kingdom) Fortec Motorsports	35	(Japan) Ryuji Yamamoto	5
(United Kingdom) Fortec Motorsports	37	(United Kingdom) Riki Christodoulou	5, 7
(United Kingdom) Fortec Motorsports	38	(United Kingdom) Duncan Tappy	5
(United Kingdom) Fortec Motorsports	39	(United Kingdom) Paul Rees	7
(France) Team Palmyr	23	(France) Jean-Michel Ogier	1–3, 5–7
(France) Team Palmyr	24	(France) Marc Cattaneo	All
(France) Team Palmyr	25	(France) Jean-Marc Menahem	1–3, 5–7
(France) Team Palmyr	33	(France) Philippe Hottinguer	5, 7
(France) Team Palmyr	40	(France) David Zollinger	1
(France) Team Palmyr	40	(France) Didier Colombat	2–6
(France) Racing Team Trajectoire	26	(France) Sylvain Milesi	1–4, 6–7
(France) Racing Team Trajectoire	41	(France) Pierre Giner	5
(France) RBA Sport	28	(France) Rodolphe Hauchard	1
(France) RBA Sport	29	(France) Stefan Romecki	1–6
(France) CD Sport	31	(France) Jean-Paul Coppens	1
(France) Lycée D'Artagnan	32	(France) Daniel Harout	1, 7

== Race calendar and results ==
Round		Circuit	Date	Pole position	Fastest lap	Winning driver	Winning team
1	1	(France) Circuit Nogaro	April 8	(France) Mathieu Arzeno	(France) Mathieu Arzeno	(France) Mathieu Arzeno	(France) Pole Services
1	2	(France) Circuit Nogaro	April 9	(France) Mathieu Arzeno	(France) Jules Bianchi	(France) Mathieu Arzeno	(France) Pole Services
2	3	(France) Circuit de Lédenon	April 28	(France) Jules Bianchi	(France) Jules Bianchi	(France) Jules Bianchi	(France) SG Formula
2	4	(France) Circuit de Lédenon	April 29	(France) Jules Bianchi	(France) Jules Bianchi	(France) Jules Bianchi	(France) SG Formula
3	5	(France) Dijon-Prenois	May 12	(France) Charles Pic	(France) Alexandre Marsoin	(France) Alexandre Marsoin	(France) SG Formula
3	6	(France) Dijon-Prenois	May 13	(France) Jules Bianchi	(France) Jules Bianchi	(France) Jules Bianchi	(France) SG Formula
4	7	(France) Circuit du Val de Vienne	July 7	(France) Mathieu Arzeno	(France) Jules Bianchi	(France) Mathieu Arzeno	(France) Epsilon Support
4	8	(France) Circuit du Val de Vienne	July 8	(United Kingdom) Alexander Sims	(France) Jules Bianchi	(France) Alexandre Marsoin	(France) SG Formula
5	9	(France) Circuit de Nevers Magny-Cours	September 23	(United Kingdom) Duncan Tappy	(France) Jules Bianchi	(France) Mathieu Arzeno	(France) Epsilon Support
6	10	(France) Circuit de Nevers Magny-Cours	October 13	(France) Jules Bianchi	(France) Jules Bianchi	(France) Jules Bianchi	(France) SG Formula
6	11	(France) Circuit de Nevers Magny-Cours	October 14	(France) Jules Bianchi	(United Kingdom) Jon Lancaster	(United Kingdom) Jon Lancaster	(France) SG Formula
7	12	(Spain) Circuit de Catalunya	October 27	(France) Jules Bianchi	(France) Jules Bianchi	(France) Jules Bianchi	(France) SG Formula
7	13	(Spain) Circuit de Catalunya	October 28	(United Kingdom) Jon Lancaster	(United Kingdom) Jon Lancaster	(United Kingdom) Jon Lancaster	(France) SG Formula

== Results and standings ==
Race point system
Position	1st	2nd	3rd	4th	5th	6th	7th	8th	9th	10th
Points	15	12	10	8	6	5	4	3	2	1

- In each race 1 point for Fastest lap and 1 for Pole position.
- Races : 2 race by rounds (first between 60 and 80 km, second between 20 and 30 minutes).

A Rookie (R) and Challenger Cup (C) classifications are also established for newcomers and young drivers.

Pos	Driver	(France) NOG		(France) LED		(France) DIJ		(France) VDV		(France) MAG	(France) MAG		(Spain) CAT		Points
Pos	Driver	1	2	3	4	5	6	7	8	9	10	11	12	13	Points
1	(France) Jules Bianchi (R)	2	3	1	1	4	1	2	2	3	1	5	1	3	172
2	(France) Mathieu Arzeno	1	1	2	Ret	9	5	1	3	1	4	4	5	5	123
3	(France) Alexandre Marsoin	Ret	2	10	9	1	Ret	7	1	Ret	Ret	3	2	2	84
4	(France) Charles Pic (R)	9	4	Ret	5	Ret	2	Ret	Ret	Ret	3	2	3	4	69
5	(France) Tristan Vautier (R)	3	6	9	3	3	7	5	7	11	Ret	7	4	7	69
6	(United Kingdom) Jon Lancaster			8	21	8	17	10	5	7	2	1	DNS	1	64
7	(France) Pierre Combot	5	Ret	Ret	13	2	6	3	10	6	6	11	8	10	52
8	(France) Nelson Lukes (R)	Ret	9	3	2	11	3	6	6	24	Ret	10	Ret	14	45
9	(France) Kévin Estre (R)	6	10	6	4	Ret	Ret	4	8	12	7	6	6	11	45
10	(France) Sébastien Chardonnet	12	5	4	8	10	4	8	Ret	8	Ret	9	11	Ret	34
11	(United Kingdom) Craig Dolby	4	18	7	11	14	10	9	Ret	10	8	12	7	8	28
12	(France) Bastien Borget (R)	8	21	Ret	Ret	6	Ret	11	12	9	5	8	13	11	21
13	(Switzerland) Gary Hirsch (R)	15	23	Ret	10	7	Ret	Ret	9	4	9	Ret	Ret	Ret	19
14	(France) Nelson Panciatici	7	7	Ret	6	5	Ret								19
15	(United Kingdom) Alexander Sims			5	7	12	8	Ret	18	Ret			14	6	19
16	(United Kingdom) Duncan Tappy									2					13
17	(France) Edouard Texte (R)	16	11	Ret	DNS			Ret	4	Ret					8
18	(France) Kevin Van Heek	10	8												4
19	(United Kingdom) Alex Morgan									5			10	9	3
20	(Switzerland) Jonathan Hirschi					16	9								2
21	(United Kingdom) Riki Christodoulou									23			9	Ret	2
22	(France) Benjamin Lariche (R)	19	12	12	12	13	13	13	11	20	10	18	Ret	16	1
23	(France) Sylvain Milesi (C)	13	13	11	14	15	11	14	14		11	14	12	13	0
24	(France) Nicolas Marroc	14	15	13	15	17	12	12	13	Ret	12	13	16	17	0
25	(France) Stéphane Romecki (R)(C)	17	17	14	16	18	Ret	15	19	17	13	15			0
26	(France) Stéphane Panepinto (R)(C)							Ret	15	13					0
27	(France) Jean-Michel Ogier (R)(C)	Ret	22	16	17	19	14			14	Ret	16	18	22	0
28	(France) Didier Colombat (R)(C)			17	20	21	Ret	16	16	21	14	DNS			0
29	(France) David Zollinger (R)	18	14												0
30	(France) Marc Cattaneo (R)(C)	20	25	18	18	20	15	17	15	16	16	19	20	18	0
31	(France) Jean-Marc Menahem (R)(C)	22	24	15	19	22	18			18	15	17	17	19	0
32	(United Kingdom) Paul Rees												15	15	0
33	(France) Pierre Giner									15					0
34	(France) Daniel Harout	16	16										19	20	0
35	(Belgium) Maxime Martin (R)					23	16								0
36	(France) Jean-Paul Coppens (R)	19	19												0
37	(France) Philippe Hottinguer									19			21	21	0
38	(France) Rodolphe Hauchard	21	20												0
39	(Japan) Ryuji Yamamoto									22					0
