= Gary Hirsch =

Swiss racing driver (born 1987)

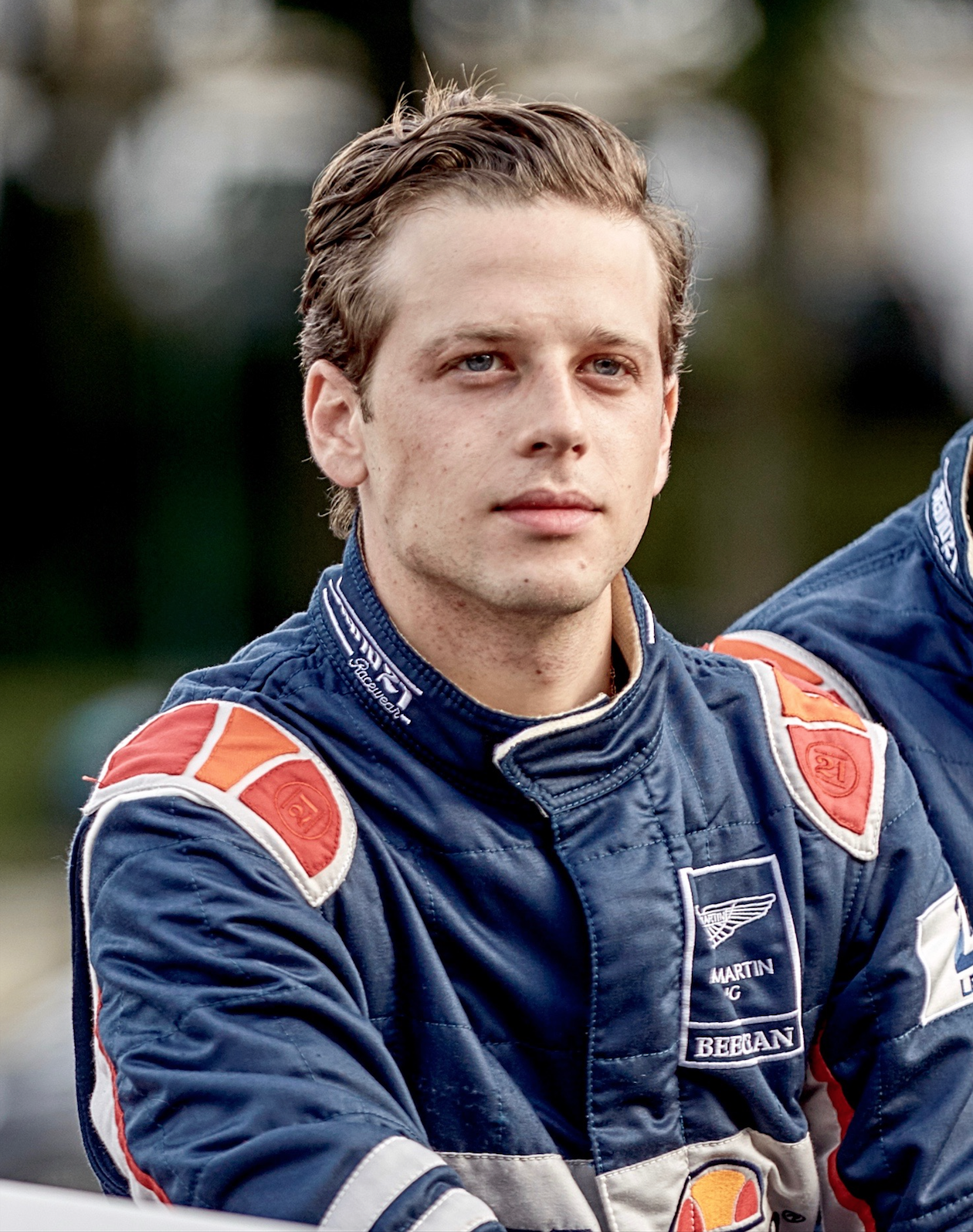
- Hirsch in 2016
- Nationality: (Switzerland) Swiss
- Born: 3 April 1987 (age 39) Geneva, Switzerland
- Categorisation: FIA Silver (until 2015, 2026–); FIA Gold (2016–2025)

Championship titles
- 2015 2013: European Le Mans Series – LMP2; European Le Mans Series – LMPC

Gary Hirsch (born 3 April 1987) is a Swiss former racing driver who last competed in the LMGTE Am class of the FIA World Endurance Championship for Aston Martin Racing.

== Career ==
Hirsch began karting at the age of 12, competing until 2004, most notably winning the Rotax Max Swiss Karting Challenge in 2002. After finishing runner-up in the Volant Mygale shootout in 2004 and racing part-time in the British Formula Ford Championship a year later, Hirsch joined Graff Racing to race in the French Formula Renault 2.0 series. Hirsch then made a one-off appearance in Formula Renault Asia 2.0 in 2008, before taking a three year hiatus to focus on his studies at the University of Geneva. In 2011, Hirsch raced in the first two rounds of the FIA GT3 European Championship with Graff Racing, taking a best result of fifth at Silverstone.

Following a two year hiatus, Hirsch joined Team Endurance Challenge to race in the LMPC class of the European Le Mans Series alongside Paul-Loup Chatin. After finishing second at Silverstone, the pair won the following three races to take the points lead, before securing the LMPC title by finishing second in the finale at Le Castellet.

Staying in the European Le Mans Series for 2014, Hirsch joined Newblood by Morand Racing to race in the LMP2 class alongside Christian Klien and Romain Brandela. Hirsch began the season with a third-place finish at Silverstone, before scoring his only win of the season two races later at Le Castellet and ending the year with a second-place finish at Estoril to end the year third in points. During 2014, Hirsch also made his debut in the 24 Hours of Le Mans alongside Klien and Brandela, finishing sixth in the LMP2 class and tenth overall.

Hirsch remained in the European Le Mans Series for 2015, joining Greaves Motorsport alongside Jon Lancaster and Björn Wirdheim for his sophomore season in the LMP2 class. Starting off the season with a win at Silverstone, Hirsch finished fourth in the following two races, before winning at Le Castellet and finishing second at Estoril to secure the LMP2 title. During 2015, Hirsch competed in the 24 Hours of Le Mans for the same team, running as high as second before retiring with an electrical issue.

The following year, Hirsch was upgraded to an FIA Gold Categorisation, and only raced at the 24 Hours of Le Mans for Aston Martin Racing. Racing in the LMGTE Am class alongside Liam Griffin and Andrew Howard, the trio finished seventh in class. Three years after his last appearance in racing, Hirsch joined Rebellion Racing as their test and reserve driver for the 2018–19 FIA World Endurance Championship.

== Karting record ==
=== Karting career summary ===
Season	Series	Team	Position
2002	Challenge Suisse de Karting – Rotax Max		1st
2003	Suisse Romand championship – ICA		NC
2004	Suisse Romand championship Elite	ORS Kart Racing Team	5th
2004	24 Hours of Suisse		1st

== Racing record ==
=== Racing career summary ===
Season	Series	Team	Races	Wins	Poles	F/Laps	Podiums	Points	Position
2005	British Formula Ford Championship			2	2				
2007	Championnat de France Formula Renault 2.0	Graff Racing	13	0	0	0	0	19	13th
2007	Eurocup Formula Renault 2.0	Graff Racing	6	0	0	0	0	0	31st
2008	Formula Asia 2.0	Champ Motorsport	2	0	0	0	0	12	11th
2011	FIA GT3 European Championship	Graff Racing	4	0	0	0	0	20	24th
2013	European Le Mans Series – LMPC	Team Endurance Challenge	5	3	4	0	5	115	**1st**
2014	European Le Mans Series – LMP2	Newblood by Morand Racing	5	1	0	0	3	68	**3rd**
2014	24 Hours of Le Mans – LMP2	Newblood by Morand Racing	1	0	0	0	0	—N/a	6th
2015	European Le Mans Series – LMP2	Greaves Motorsport	5	2	1	0	3	93	**1st**
2015	24 Hours of Le Mans – LMP2	Greaves Motorsport	1	0	0	0	0	—N/a	DNF
2016	FIA World Endurance Championship – LMGTE Am	Aston Martin Racing	1	0	0	0	0	24	11th
2016	24 Hours of Le Mans – LMGTE Am	Aston Martin Racing	1	0	0	0	0	—N/a	7th
2018–19	FIA World Endurance Championship – LMP1	Rebellion Racing	Reserve driver						

=== Complete Championnat de France Formula Renault 2.0 results ===
(key) (Races in bold indicate pole position; races in italics indicate fastest lap)

Year	Team	1	2	3	4	5	6	7	8	9	10	11	12	13	Pos	Points
2007	Graff Racing	NOG; 1; 15	NOG; 2; 23	LED; 1 Ret	LED; 2; 10	DIJ; 1; 7	DIJ; 2 Ret	VIE; 1 Ret	VIE; 2; 9	MAG1; 4	MAG2; 1; 9	MAG2; 2 Ret	CAT; 1 Ret	CAT; 2 Ret	13th	19

=== Complete Eurocup Formula Renault 2.0 results ===
(key) (Races in bold indicate pole position; races in italics indicate fastest lap)

Year	Team	1	2	3	4	5	6	7	8	9	10	11	12	13	14	Pos	Points
2007	Graff Racing	ZOL; 1; 26	ZOL; 2; 22	NÜR; 1; 18	NÜR; 2; 17	HUN; 1	HUN; 2	DON; 1	DON; 2	MAG; 1	MAG; 2	EST; 1	EST; 2	CAT; 1	CAT; 2	31st	0

=== Complete FIA GT3 European Championship results ===
(key) (Races in bold indicate pole position; races in italics indicate fastest lap)

Year	Entrant	Chassis	Engine	1	2	3	4	5	6	7	8	9	10	11	12	Pos.	Points
2011	Graff Racing	Mercedes-Benz SLS AMG GT3	Mercedes-Benz 6.2 L V8	ALG; 1; 6	ALG; 2 Ret	SIL; 1; 9	SIL; 2; 5	NAV; 1	NAV; 2	LEC; 1	LEC; 2	SLO; 1	SLO; 2	ZAN; 1	ZAN; 2	24th	20

=== Complete European Le Mans Series results ===
(key) (Races in bold indicate pole position; results in italics indicate fastest lap)

Year	Entrant	Class	Chassis	Engine	1	2	3	4	5	Rank	Points
2013	Team Endurance Challenge	LMPC	Oreca FLM09	Chevrolet LS3 6.2L V8	**SIL**; 2	**IMO**; 1	RBR; 1	**HUN**; 1	**LEC**; 2	1st	115
2014	Newblood by Morand Racing	LMP2	Morgan LMP2	Judd HK 3.6 L V8	SIL; 3	IMO; Ret	RBR; 5	LEC; 1	EST; 2	3rd	68
2015	Greaves Motorsport	LMP2	Gibson 015S	Nissan VK45DE 4.5 L V8	**SIL**; 1	IMO; 4	RBR; 4	LEC; 1	EST; 2	1st	93

=== 24 Hours of Le Mans results ===
Year	Team	Co-Drivers	Car	Class	Laps	Pos.	Class Pos.
2014	(Switzerland) Newblood by Morand Racing	(Austria) Christian Klien (France) Romain Brandela	Morgan LMP2-Judd	LMP2	352	10th	6th
2015	(United Kingdom) Greaves Motorsport	(United Kingdom) Jon Lancaster (France) Gaëtan Paletou	Gibson 015S-Nissan	LMP2	71	DNF	DNF
2016	(United Kingdom) Aston Martin Racing	(United Kingdom) Liam Griffin (United Kingdom) Andrew Howard	Aston Martin V8 Vantage GTE	GTE; Am	318	36th	7th

=== Complete FIA World Endurance Championship results ===
Year	Entrant	Class	Car	Engine	1	2	3	4	5	6	7	8	9	Rank	Points
2016	Aston Martin Racing	LMGTE Am	Aston Martin Vantage GTE	Aston Martin 4.5 L V8	SIL	SPA	LMS; 4	NÜR	MEX	COA	FUJ	SHA	BHR	11th	24
