= Mauro Bianchi =

Belgian former racing driver (born 1937)

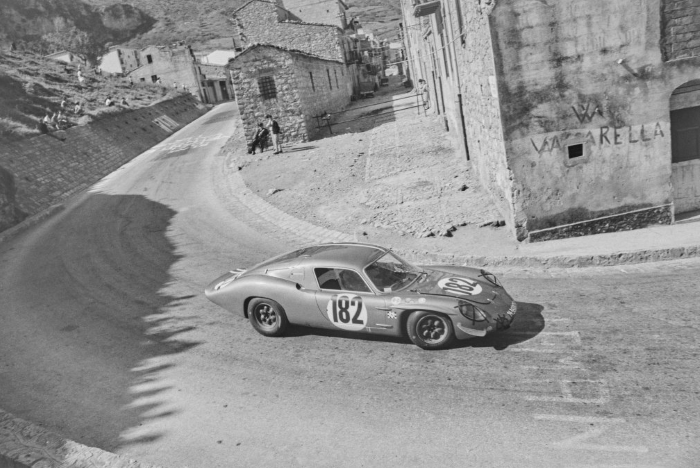
- Bianchi's and Vinatier's Alpine A210 Renault at the 1967 Targa Florio
- Born: 31 July 1937 (age 89) Milan, Italy
24 Hours of Le Mans career
- Years: 1962, 1964-1968
- Teams: Alpine
- Best finish: 13th (1966 and 1967)
- Class wins: 1 (1967)

Mauro Bianchi (born 31 July 1937) is an Italian-born Belgian racing driver. He won the 1965 Nürburgring 500 km with his brother Lucien and the 1966 Macau Grand Prix and participated in six editions of the 24 Hours of Le Mans in 1962, 1964, 1965, 1966, 1967 and 1968.

== Personal life ==
Bianchi was born in Milan, Italy, but moved to Belgium in 1946 when he was still a child, with his father who was a race mechanic working, before the Second World War, in the Alfa Romeo competition department. His brother, Lucien Bianchi, was also a racing driver. They drove to victory together in the 1965 Nürburgring 500 km. Lucien died after an incident that occurred during testing for the 1969 24 Hours of Le Mans. Bianchi's grandson, Jules Bianchi, who made his Formula One debut with the Marussia team for the 2013 season competing under the French flag, also died as a result of injuries sustained in a racing accident.

== Career ==
Bianchi joined the Alpine team in 1964, with which he raced in various categories including Formula 3, Formula 2 and endurance. He won the 1966 Macau Grand Prix, making him the only Belgian to do so. Bianchi later won the P1.6 class at the 1967 24 Hours of Le Mans. During the 1968 24 Hours of Le Mans, he was involved in a very serious accident. Following his brother's fatal accident at Le Mans in 1969, Bianchi retired from racing.

Subsequently, Bianchi was an engineer and test driver for Venturi, and Alpine developing the A310.
