= Jean Vinatier =

French former rally and racing driver (born 1933)

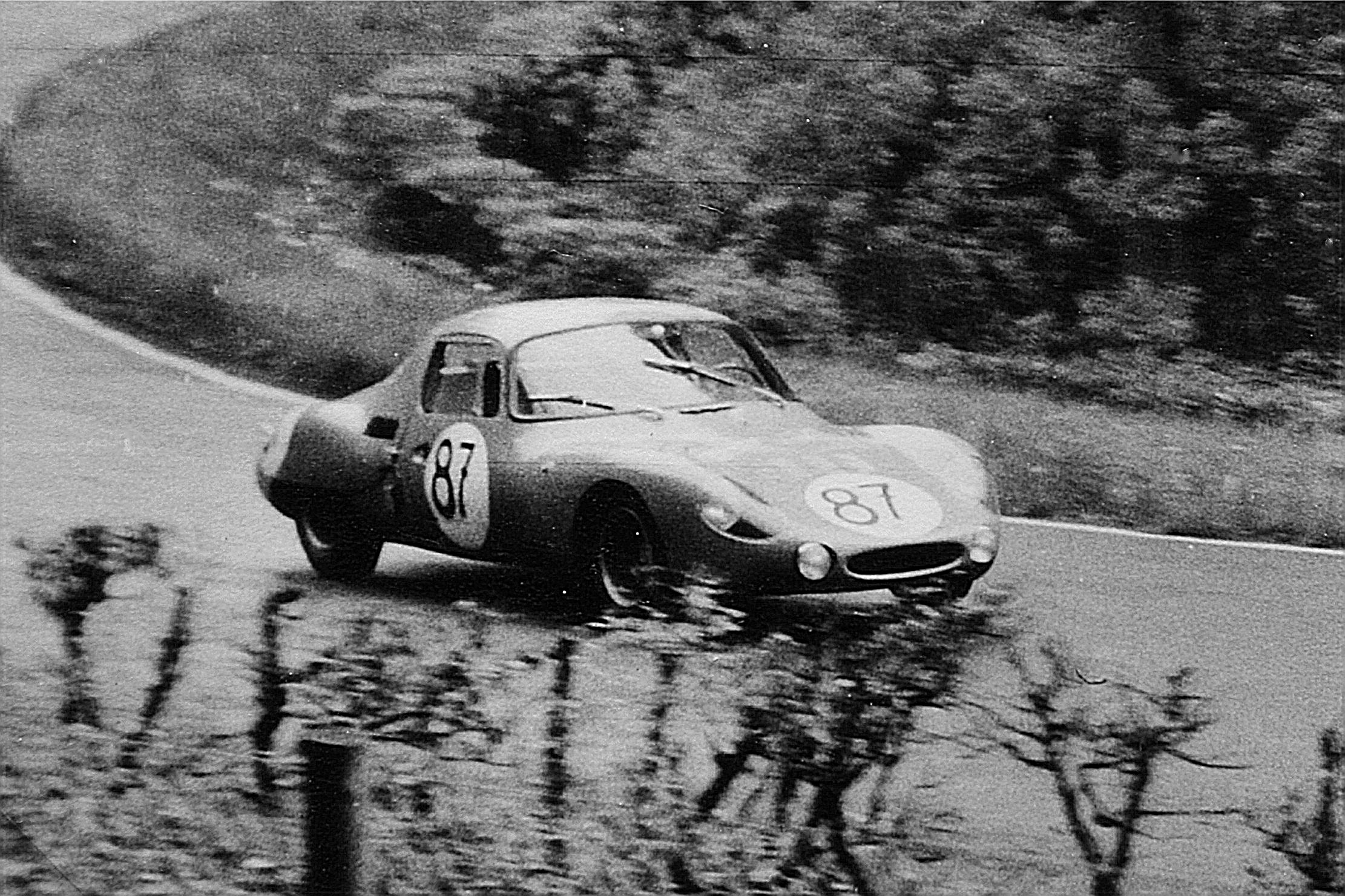
- Vinatier's René Bonnet Djet at the 1963 1000 km Nürburgring
- Born: 25 November 1933 (age 92)
24 Hours of Le Mans career
- Years: 1958–1969, 1972, 1973
- Teams: Abarth & Cie, Automobiles René Bonnet, Société des Automobiles Alpine, Ford Motorwerke
- Best finish: 8th (1968)
- Class wins: 1 (1967)

Jean Vinatier (born 25 November 1933) is a French former rally and racing driver. He won the Tour de Corse with a Renault 8 Gordini in 1964 and the Alpine Rally with an Alpine-Renault A110 in 1968 and 1969. In the last Alpine Rally in 1971, he finished second to Bernard Darniche and recorded his third consecutive penalty-free run, becoming the third driver after Ian Appleyard and Stirling Moss to achieve the much-coveted Coupe d'Or (Gold Cup).

Driving the Alpine A110, Vinatier also won the French Rally Championship in 1969 and finished third that same year at the Monte Carlo Rally, behind the Porsche 911s of Björn Waldegård and Gérard Larrousse. In 1970, he took part in four events in the International Championship for Manufacturers, the predecessor to the World Rally Championship. He finished second in the Acropolis Rally in Greece, behind another A110 driven by Jean-Luc Thérier, and third in the Rallye Sanremo in Italy, behind Thérier and Harry Källström.

Vinatier also competed in endurance racing. In the final Mille Miglia in 1957, he was the first driver to go past the scene of the crash that killed eleven people. In the 24 Hours of Le Mans, Vinatier competed 14 times from 1958 to 1973. He won his class with Mauro Bianchi, brother of Lucien Bianchi, in 1967. His best overall result in the event was eighth with André de Cortanze the following year. After his racing career, Vinatier has worked as a technical delegate for the Fédération Internationale de l'Automobile (FIA).

== Complete IMC results ==
Year	Entrant	Car	1	2	3	4	5	6	7	8
1970	Alpine Renault	Alpine-Renault A110 1600	MON; Ret	SWE; Ret	ITA; 3	KEN	AUT	GRE; 2	GBR	
1971	Alpine Renault	Alpine-Renault A110 1600	MON; 9	SWE	ITA	KEN				
1971		Citroën SM Maserati					MAR; Ret	AUT	GRE	GBR
