= 1968 24 Hours of Le Mans =

36th 24 Hours of Le Mans endurance race

| Previous: 1967 | Next: 1969 |
Index: Races | Winners

The 1968 24 Hours of Le Mans was the 36th Grand Prix of Endurance, and took place on 28 and 29 September 1968 on the Circuit de la Sarthe, in Le Mans, France.

A significant change was the introduction of a 3 L (183 cu in) engine limit on Group 6 cars, to lower overall track speeds. Originally scheduled for the weekend of 15 and 16 June, the race had to be delayed until September due to protests, strikes, and civil unrest in France during the spring of 1968. The rescheduled race increased the chances of the Group 6 Prototypes against the Group 4 Sports cars, as the new Prototype cars had matured during the season. It also increased the amount of darkness that drivers would be racing in compared to June, by about three hours: a total of 11 hours. Its new date made it the tenth and final round of the 1968 World Sportscar Championship of a tense and close championship between Ford and Porsche.

The winners were Pedro Rodriguez and Lucien Bianchi, in the J.W. Automotive Gulf-Oil Ford GT40. Despite Porsche finishing second and third, the victory was enough to give Ford the manufacturer's title.

There were also two major accidents during the race ending the racing careers of Willy Mairesse and Mauro Bianchi (Lucien's younger brother), who both suffered severe burns in the crashes.

== Regulations ==
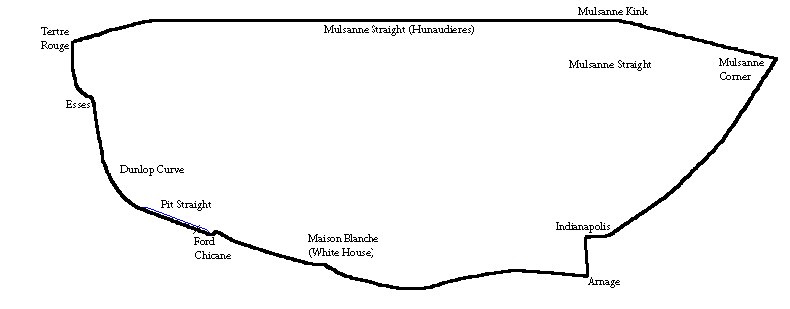
Le Mans in 1968. Traffic flow is clockwise.

Straight after the 1967 race, the CSI (Commission Sportive Internationale - the FIA’s regulatory body) convened to discuss ways to limit the increasingly dangerous speeds in Sports car racing, mindful of what led to the 1955 disaster. It was decided to impose a 3-litre (120-litre fuel tank) on Group 6 Prototypes and a 5-litre limit (160-litre fuel tank) on Group 4 Sports. There remained no engine limit on the Group 3 GTs. It effectively banned the big-block Fords and Chaparral, as well as the big Ferraris and the new Mirage and Lola-Aston Martin and marked the end of an era. The theory was that manufacturers would turn to the use of 3-litre Formula One engines to save development costs.

However, it was the immediate implementation in the next year that caused much unrest with the companies. The CSI cited ‘safety concerns’ justifying the rapid action. Enzo Ferrari cancelled his Prototype program. He was not alone in believing a 5-litre Sports car would outperform a 3-litre Prototype, and that only the big manufacturers would be able to make the minimum 50 big-engined cars to get Group 4 homologation.

Because the race was rescheduled and the longer period of darkness, the Automobile Club de l'Ouest (ACO) permitted one battery change. With high speed being such a talking point, Ford volunteered to sponsor a major road realignment on the main straight, installing a chicane just before the pitlane. The changes added at least 10 seconds to a lap, as well as causing greater wear on tyres and brakes. Although the track had been widened and safety features of the track improved in the aftermath of the 1955 disaster, this was the first significant layout-change to the circuit since 1932. Diverting the racing away from the pits also significantly increased the safety of the pit-crews. Finally, in line with the global racing trend, commercial advertising was now allowed on cars.

== Entries ==
Although devoid of the big team entries from Ford and Ferrari there were still 94 applications for this year's race, and 58 cars arrived to qualify for the 54 starting places. Into that space the biggest entries were from Porsche and Alpine with 13 and 11 cars respectively. The new regulations did have a positive impact on redressing the imbalance of the Prototypes to the other two categories

| Category | Classes | Prototype Group 6 | Sports Group 4 | GT Group 3 | Total Entries |
|---|---|---|---|---|---|
| Large-engines | >2.0L classes | 12 (+2 reserves) | 11 | 5 | 28 (+2 reserves) |
| Medium-engines | 1.6 / 2.0L classes | 11 (+2 reserves) | 1 | 2 (+2 reserves) | 14 (+4 reserves) |
| Small-engines | 1.15 / 1.3L classes | 6 (+1 reserve) | 0 | 1 (+1 reserve) | 7 (+2 reserves) |
| Total Cars | | 29 (+5 reserves) | 12 | 8 (+3 reserves) | 49 (+8 reserves) |

With the withdrawal of the Ford factory teams, J.W. Automotive had bought the rights to racing the GT40 and took over the Ford Advanced Vehicles facility at Slough. Backed by Gulf Oil and its distinctive light blue and orange livery. One of the previous year's Mirages was reverted to a GT40 while two new cars were built, this time all running a 5-litre V8, generating 415 bhp. The Gulf GT40s received some of the improvements of the Mirage, and a significant effort was made to reduce the weight of car using high-tech materials. A large part of the body was made of a very thin polyester sheet reinforced with carbon fibre. The cars were very competitive having already won four races. Wyer's two best drivers however weren't present: Jacky Ickx and Brian Redman, winners at Brands Hatch and Spa, had both broken limbs from Formula 1 accidents (at Mont Tremblant and Spa respectively) Former Ferrari-stalwart Pedro Rodriguez, and Alfa Romeo team-driver Lucien Bianchi were brought in for the race. Paul Hawkins / David Hobbs (race winners at Monza) had their regular car while Brian Muir / Jackie Oliver had the new chassis.

There were also regular GT40 privateer entries, from Claude Dubois (with drivers Willy Mairesse/”Beurlys”), and Mike Salmon, having recovered from the burns he got in his Ford the previous year.

Ferrari was true to his word and boycotted Le Mans, which also left several of his customer teams stranded, like the Equipe Nationale Belge and British Maranello Concessionaires. Ferrari hopes therefore fell back onto the four-year old 275 LM in Group 4. The North American Racing Team (NART) entered three different Ferraris: 1965 race-winner Masten Gregory re-joining his winning 275 LM car, a 275 GTB in the GT category and a Dino 206 S in the 2-litre Prototype class. Similarly, Scuderia Filipinetti had several options and also settled on running a 275 LM and a 275 GTB. The Swiss team also ran a pair of the latest 7-litre Corvette Stingrays in the GT division. There were two British privateer Ferraris. David Piper had done a major rebuild of his car, replacing most of its aluminium body with a polyester/fiberglass shell to reduce weight.

A number of manufacturers stepped up to fill the leading prototype positions vacated by Ford and Ferrari: Porsche's ongoing development program wound up a notch with the new Porsche 908 fitted with a new 3-litre flat-8 producing 330 bhp and over 310 km/h (190 mph), the first time Porsche competed in the largest engine class of the regulations. Still quite unreliable, Porsche had to rely on their 907s to give them race victories early in the year, but the 908 came good at the Nürburgring race. Due to their low profile, the cars used small, but very bright quartz-iodine headlights, but this necessitated two alternators in each car rather than dynamos. With 5 wins to Ford's 4, Porsche had a narrow lead in the Championship coming into this final round, looking for its first overall FIA Championship.

So four 908s were prepared for the works team, in langheck (longtail) form for the long fast straights. Their top pair were Jo Siffert (4 wins) and Hans Herrmann (2 wins). Rising sports-car start Vic Elford (the other race winner) was with Gerhard Mitter, Porsche regulars Rolf Stommelen and Jochen Neerpasch had the third while the Americans Joe Buzzetta/Scooter Patrick the fourth. The company also supported three privateers running the reliable 907 'langheck': Spaniard Alex Soler-Roig, Frenchman Philippe Farjon and the new Swiss team Squadra Tartaruga of Rico Steinemann.

The new Matra 3-litre V12 had its race debut simultaneously in May at the Monaco F1 GP and the Spa 1000 km. Capable of a powerful 380 bhp, the company was initially not going to run at Le Mans, however the deferred date allowed for more testing and a single MS630 longtail was prepared for team drivers Henri Pescarolo and Johnny Servoz-Gavin.

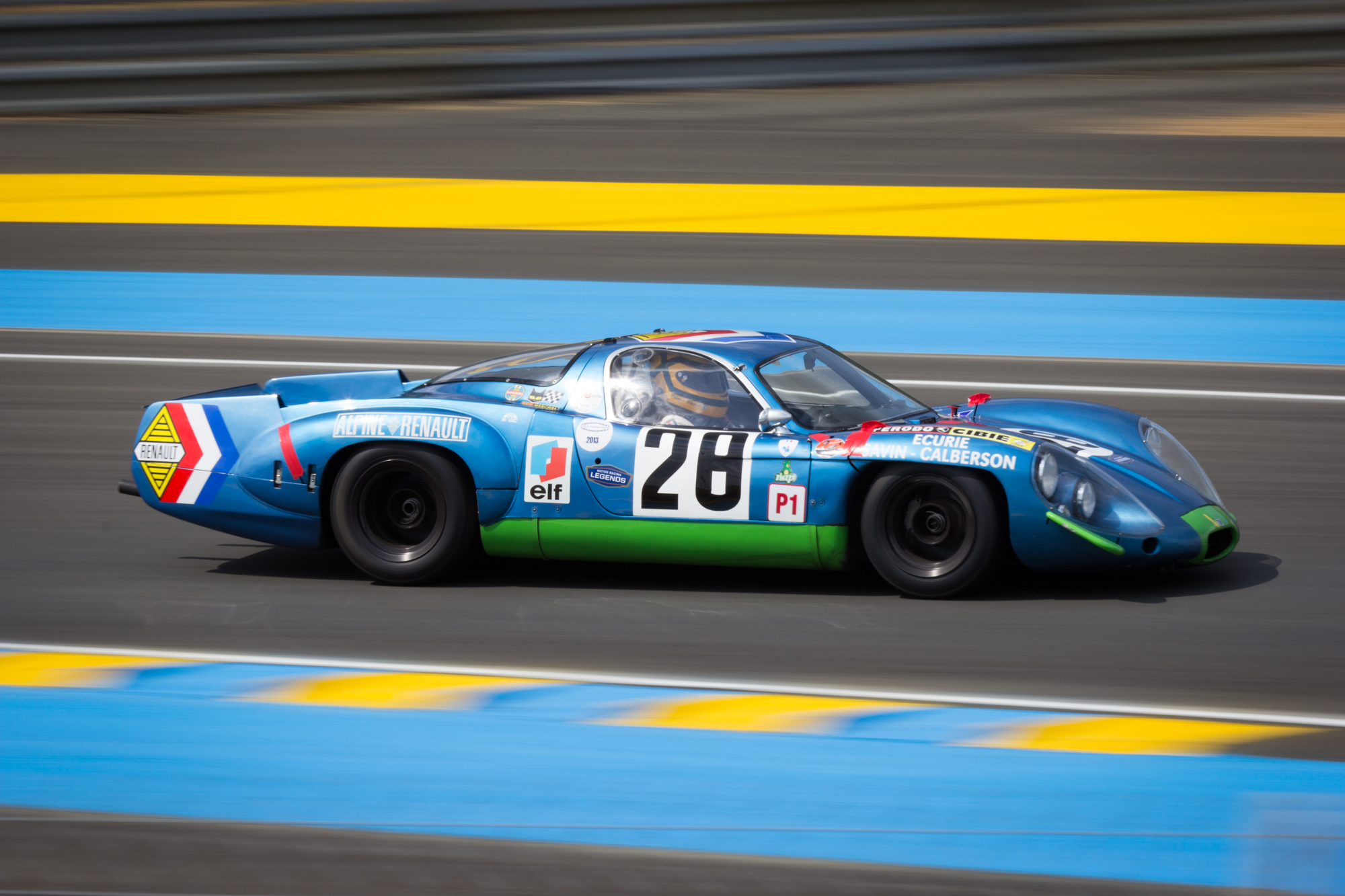
The Alpine A220 driven by Grandsire/Larrousse, photographed at the 2015 Le Mans Legends race

French hopes for outright victory mainly rested on Alpine. A proven record in the smaller classes encouraged Jean Rédélé to move up to the main category. But the new Gordini-prepared Renault 3-litre V8 only produced 310 bhp for the new A220 design. After racing earlier in the year, the car now had a rear spoiler to try to correct a dangerous aerodynamic fault: at the Nürburgring the Alpine of Henri Grandsire had got airborne and done a 360˚ loop. Jacques Cheinisse retired from racing to manage the racing team, and a big effort put eleven cars on the grid, second only to Porsche. The works team ran three A220s for Grandsire and Gérard Larrousse, Jean Guichet/Jean-Pierre Jabouille and Alpine engineer André de Cortanze/Jean Vinatier. Regular customer team Ecurie Savin-Calberson also entered one for Mauro Bianchi and Patrick Depailler and they also put an A210 in the 2-litre category. Alpine also ran the A210 in the 1300cc and 1150cc Prototype classes, including a debut for 30-race Le Mans veteran Bob Wollek. Finally, two of the homologated A110 were run in the GT category by French privateers.

British entries were limited. The Lola T70 now had a 5-litre Chevrolet engine in the Sports category. John Woolfe commissioned Chevron to build a new car. The B12 was a one-off design with a fibreglass body and carrying a modified version of the 3-litre Formula 1 Repco-Brabham V8 engine developing 330 bhp. Austin-Healey, as well as their regular Le Mans Sprite entry, developed a new 2-litre prototype with the Coventry Climax FWMV V8 engine that put out 240 bhp. It was run by Healey's regular drivers Clive Baker and Andrew Hedges.

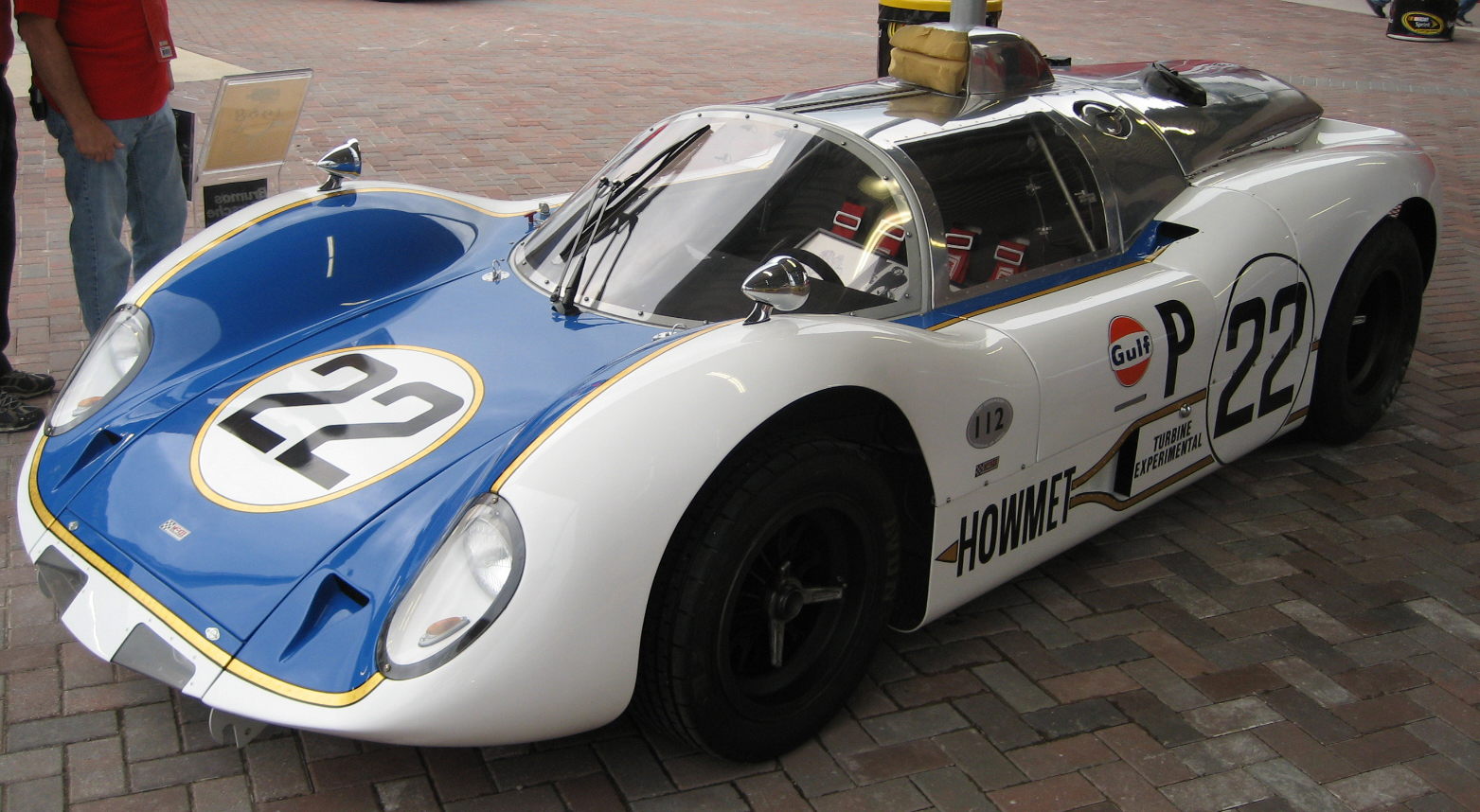
Howmet TX of Heppenstall/Thompson. It retired due to an accident.

In line with the ACO's commitment to technological development, there were two turbine-powered Howmet TXs entered in the prototype class, following on from the Rover-BRM last run in 1965. Ray Heppenstall designed a car on a Group 7 Can-Am chassis, with an aluminium shell from Howmet Castings. The Continental turbine was from a helicopter and rated as an equivalent to 3-litres with 325 bhp. It was very light but thirsty on its paraffin fuel. After a 3rd place at Watkins Glen it had shown reliability. Heppenstall drove one with race-veteran Dick Thompson while Bob Tullius/Hugh Dibley had the other.

For two years Autodelta, the racing division of Alfa Romeo, had had a difficult time developing a new sports prototype. Both Jean Rolland and Leo Cella had been killed in testing accidents. The Tipo 33/2 was the new evolution and its 2-litre V8 engine put out 260 bhp. Autodelta had four cars entered including works drivers Nino Vaccarella/Giancarlo Baghetti and ‘Nanni’ Galli/Ignazio Giunti. It also supported two cars entered by the Belgian VDS customer team.

== Practice ==
This year, for an unknown reason, the test weekend coincided with the British round of the International Championship and with the Formula 2 event at the Hockenheimring on Sunday April 7 in which Jim Clark was killed. Jacky Ickx set the test benchmark for JWA, with a 3:35.4 lap, then promptly left for Brands Hatch to win the endurance race. It was also the first appearance of the new Porsche 908, in the hands of Rolf Stommelen. It was found to need major aerodynamic refinement, but Stommelen eventually got a time of 3:44.1.

On race-week, Jo Siffert matched Ickx's test time exactly with his Porsche 908 to take pole position. The next day Stommelen and Elford claimed the next places, ahead of Rodriguez's Ford and Servoz-Gavin's Matra. The best Alpine was Bianchi's 3:43.2 in 8th, Vaccarella got his Alfa in 14th while the Howmet clocked 20th with 3:56.0. The best Ferrari was Müller's down in 27th (4:01.8). The Belgian Ford lost its oil through a faulty connection but was able to get a replacement engine from the JWA team.

During the April test many drivers had complained about the layout of the new chicane, being too tight. By September it had been redesigned to greater satisfaction.

== Race ==
=== Start ===
This year the start time was moved forward to 3pm for the spectators’ sake due to the earlier onset of darkness. The honorary starter was Fiat boss Gianni Agnelli. Race-day was showery and most of the cars started on wet tyres with a heavy shower just ten minutes before the start. Siffert, among a few others, started on pole with slicks however.

In his rush to get away, Willy Mairesse did not shut his door properly. At the end of the Mulsanne Straight at a speed of over 150 mph (241 km/h), it flew open. Trying to close it he lost control and the Ford careered off the track into the trees. Mairesse suffered broken bones and head injuries which left him in a coma for two weeks and ended his racing career. At the end of the first lap, Porsches were in the top four places, with Stommelen in the lead. Siffert took the lead on the fourth lap (already lapping tailenders), with the Fords running in 5-6-7. Johnny Servoz-Gavin brought the Matra in with a malfunctioning windscreen-wiper.

The rain had stopped and the track was drying. Soon Hawkins and Rodríguez were in, with their wet-weather tyres ruined. Then on lap 12, the lap it was due in, the third Ford went off when Muir planted it in the sand at the Mulsanne corner. After three hours of digging he burned the clutch out in his departure. By the end of two hours Siffert had lapped the field. Teammate Elford was second, with the two Gulf-Fords, Buzzetta's 908 and the Alpines of Guichet and Bianchi next. Eighth was the leading 2-litre car, Giunti's Alfa with the Matra and Piper's Ferrari filling out the top-10. Porsche then also started having problems as Stommelen and Elford both had electrical issues delaying them. Worse though was when the leading car's clutch broke just before 7pm, stranding Siffert out on the track unable to get back to the pits for repairs.

=== Night ===
This left the two Gulf Fords of Rodriguez/Bianchi and Hawkins/Hobbs swapping the lead going into the night. Then at 9pm Hobbs came into the pits also with a faulty clutch and they lost nearly 2 hours repairing it. Although they got going again, the engine soon expired spectacularly at the end of the Mulsanne Straight, just after midnight.

During the night the Guichet/Jabouille Alpine had pitted from 6th but lost three-quarters an hour getting a new starter motor fitted. Approaching 9pm, with the Fords and Porsches now all back on the same lap, the order was changing as often as the pitstops took place. The four Alfas had a stranglehold on the Index of Performance. Soon after, Henri Grandsire had another accident in the Alpine, when it got airborne over the hump at the end of the Mulsanne straight. Again, he was fortunate to be able to walk away uninjured.

Then the Mitter/Elford Porsche snapped its alternator belt. When the officials found that the team had changed the alternator they were disqualified (much to the chagrin of team manager Huschke von Hanstein) as that was a part not permitted to be replaced during the course of a race. Just before 11pm another alternator problem took out the Buzzetta/Patrick team car too (from 4th) and Porsche's hopes of outright victory were gone. Yet JWA could not be complacent, as they were also down to one competitive Ford with two-thirds of the race still to run.

Early in the second hour the second Howmet turbine had been in the pits for three hours fixing its rear suspension. Consequently, at 11pm it was disqualified for having not covered sufficient distance. The leading Howmet was also hobbled, running at 70% power, due to faulty fuel-control. Around midnight Dick Thompson hit oil at the Indianapolis corner, lost control and rolled the car. The Howmets never raced again.

The rain returned about 2.30am, got heavier and stayed for the rest of the night. Servoz-Gavin bought the Matra in with the windscreen-wiper faulty again. The Matra crew could not access the motor and were considering retiring until Henri Pescarolo angrily jumped in and took off in the rain, still with the faulty wiper.

At the 3am halfway point, the Ford (177 laps) had a comfortable 4-lap lead over the surprising next pair: the new Matra was scrapping with the 2-litre Alfa Romeo of Giunti/Galli. Meanwhile, Stommelen's delayed Porsche 908 was back on song and closing in fourth (170 laps). Fifth, on the same lap, was the Swiss Porsche 907 of Squadra Tartaruga with the Bianchi/Depailler Alpine (169 laps - back after falling to 15th to fix their exhaust) leading the Alfas of Facetti/Dini and Casoni/Biscaldi. The Cortanze/Vinatier Alpine had moved up to 9th ahead of the three Ferrari 275s of David Piper, NART and Scuderia Filipinetti. There were still 30 cars classified as runners. The first two Alfas still led the Index of Performance, narrowly ahead of the Andruet/Nicolas Alpine and the Swiss Porsche.

Soon after 5am Sylvain Garant aquaplaned and lost control of the big Corvette at the end of the pit straight in the rain. It slammed into the track-walls on both the left and right sides, strewing metal, wood and earth across the track. The injured Garant was taken to hospital. At 4.30am, the 3rd-place Alfa Romeo was delayed in the pits which gave Matra the chance to also pit, losing 3 laps and finally fix the wiper-motor. Just before dawn the Guichet/Jabouille Alpine, that had been fighting back from the back of the field after its delay had almost made it back into the top-10 when an alternator failure stopped their charge.

=== Morning ===
Dawn at 6.30am was gloomy and very wet, however the rain did eventually cease. The Ford now had a 7-lap lead over the Alfa Romeo and Matra, both on the same lap, delighting the French spectators. The Andruet/Nicolas Alpine had also now taken over the Index lead Soon after 11am, with less than four hours left in the race, the most serious accident of the race occurred. Mauro Bianchi, running 6th, had recently left the pits when he crashed heavily approaching the Esses. The full fuel tank exploded in a fireball setting alight the car and the bordering straw bales. Bianchi was lucky to survive, although he had severe burns to his face and arms. Another casualty was the Matra which got a puncture going through the debris. Servoz-Gavin got back to the pits, losing a place.

Then with only 3 hours to go there was a sudden change at the top. The Alfa Romeo came into the pits with suspension failure losing 30 minutes, and 4 laps, getting it repaired. Then more dramatically at 12.30, the pursuing Matra got another puncture. In getting it back to the pits the disintegrating tyre damaged the battery, causing an electrical fire and putting it out of the race. The Swiss Porsche that had been running so reliably inherited second.

=== Finish and post-race ===
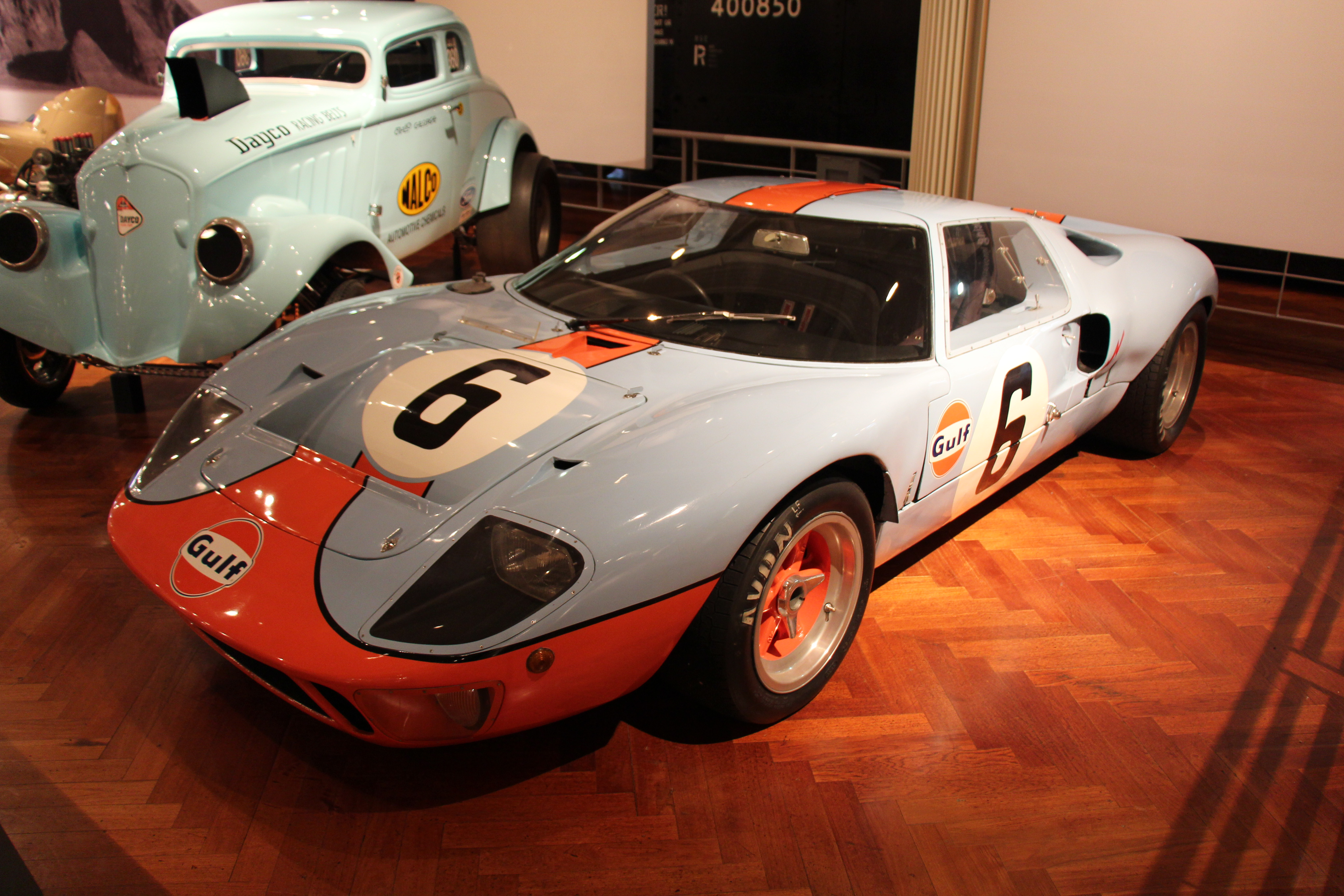
The winning GT40 of Rodriguez/Bianchi. It wore #9 during the race.

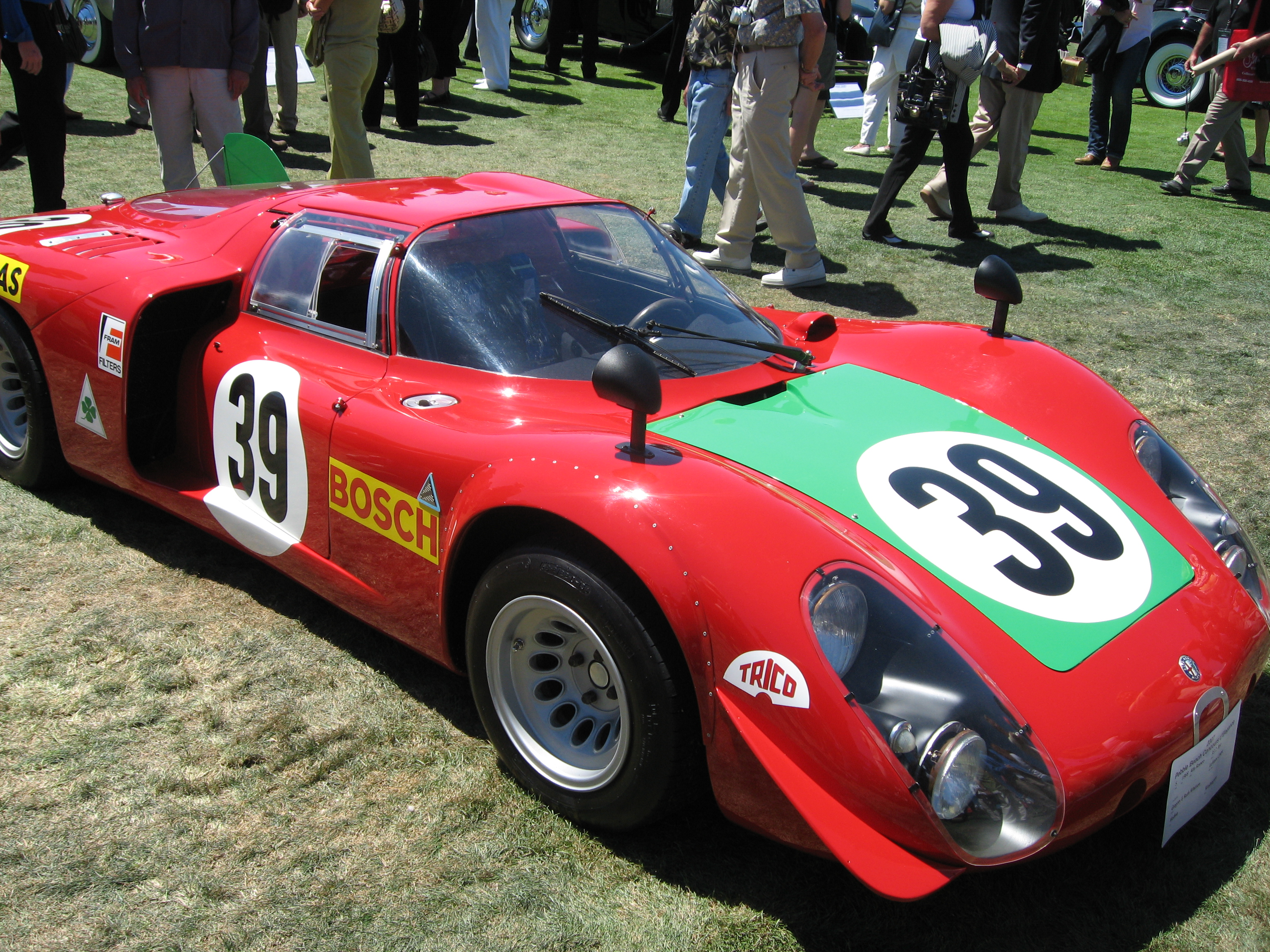
Alfa Romeo Tipo 33/2 of Giunti/Galli, which finished 4th overall and won the P 2.0 class.

In the end it was a comfortable 5-lap victory to the GT40 of Rodríguez and Bianchi. For Pedro Rodríguez, it was only his second finish after 11 attempts. For Lucien Bianchi it was his 13th Le Mans. In an excellent run for the new Squadra Tartaruga team, Steinemann and Spoerry came in second just a lap ahead of the Stommelen/Neerpasch works car. The repaired Alfa Romeo of Giunti/Galli was fourth, leading a formation finish of their Autodelta teammates coming in 4-5-6, the three of them separated by seventeen laps.

Seventh was the green Ferrari of English privateer David Piper, delayed by overheating issues but surprisingly was the only Ferrari finisher this year. Eighth was the remaining 3-litre Alpine, driven by co-designer André de Cortanze and Jean Vinatier. It headed home three of the smaller Alpines, two of which (the Thérier/Tramont 1.3-litre A210 and the Andruet/Nicolas 1-litre works cars) won the two lucrative Index prizes.

The leading GT car was the Belgian Porsche of Jean-Pierre Gaban, giving the 911 the first of many overall GT wins for the model. The final classified car, and the only British entry to finish, was the Austin-Healey Sprite in 15th.

The Matra board was very satisfied with its new car's promising performance and therefore decided to expand its racing programme. Rico Steinemann, second-place winner and a former racing journalist went on, later in the year, to succeed Huschke von Hanstein as Porsche's Racing Manager.

1968 would be a terrible year for racing accidents. As well as the career-ending injuries to Willy Mairesse and Mauro Bianchi at this race, a number of other Le Mans veterans were killed or seriously injured over the racing season. These included Ludovico Scarfiotti (Rossfeld hillclimb), Jo Schlesser (French Grand Prix), Brian Redman (injured at Belgian Grand Prix), Mike Spence (Indianapolis), Chris Irwin (Nürburgring) and the great Jim Clark at Hockenheim. Circuit safety would become a greater and greater priority at Le Mans and in motor-racing in the next few years.

== Official results ==
=== Finishers ===
Results taken from Quentin Spurring's book, officially licensed by the ACO Class Winners are in Bold text.

| Pos | Class | No | Team | Drivers | Chassis | Engine | Laps |
|---|---|---|---|---|---|---|---|
| 1 | **S** **5.0** | **9** | **(United Kingdom) JW Automotive Engineering** | **(Mexico) Pedro Rodriguez** **(Belgium) Lucien Bianchi** | Ford GT40 | Ford 4.9L V8 | 331 |
| 2 | **P** **3.0** | **66** (reserve) | **(Switzerland) Squadra Tartaruga** | **(Switzerland) Hans-Heinrich ‘Rico’ Steinemann** **(Switzerland) Dieter Spoerry** | Porsche 907LH | Porsche 2.2L F8 | 326 |
| 3 | P 3.0 | 33 | (Germany) Porsche System Engineering | (West Germany) Rolf Stommelen (West Germany) Jochen Neerpasch | Porsche 908LH | Porsche 3.0 L Flat-8 | 325 |
| 4 | **P** **2.0** | **39** | **(Italy) Autodelta SpA** | **(Italy) Ignazio Giunti** **(Italy) Giovanni ‘Nanni’ Galli** | Alfa Romeo T33/2 | Alfa Romeo 1996cc V8 | 322 |
| 5 | P 2.0 | 38 | (Italy) Autodelta SpA | (Italy) Carlo Facetti (Italy) Spartaco Dini | Alfa Romeo T33/2 | Alfa Romeo 1996cc V8 | 315 |
| 6 | P 2.0 | 40 | (Italy) Autodelta SpA | (Italy) Mario Casoni (Italy) Giampiero Biscaldi | Alfa Romeo T33/2 | Alfa Romeo 1996cc V8 | 305 |
| 7 | S 5.0 | 21 | (United Kingdom) D. Piper (private entrant) | (United Kingdom) David Piper (United Kingdom) Richard Attwood | Ferrari 250LM | Ferrari 3.3L V12 | 302 |
| 8 | P 3.0 | 30 | (France) Société Automobiles; Alpine | (France) André de Cortanze (France) Jean Vinatier | Alpine A220 | Renault-Gordini 3.0L V8 | 297 |
| 9 | P 2.0 | 57 (reserve) | (France) Ecurie Savin-Calberson | (France) Alain LeGuellec (France) Alain Serpaggi | Alpine A210 | Renault-Gordini 1470cc S4 | 289 |
| 10 | **P** **1.3** | **52** | (France) **Société Automobiles**; **Alpine** | **(France) Jean-Luc Thérier** **(France) Bernard Tramont** | Alpine A210 | Renault-Gordini 1296cc S4 | 288 |
| 11 | P 1.3 | 53 | (France) Trophée Le Mans | (France) Bob Wollek (France) Christian Ethuin | Alpine A210 | Renault-Gordini 1296cc S4 | 282 |
| 12 | **GT**; **2.0** | **43** | **(Belgium) J.-P. Gaban** (private entrant) | **(Belgium) Jean-Pierre Gaban** **(Belgium) Roger van der Schrick** | Porsche 911 T | Porsche 1991cc F6 | 281 |
| 13 | GT; 2.0 | 64 (reserve) | (France) C. Laurent (private entrant) | (France) Claude Laurent (France) Jean-Claude Ogier | Porsche 911 T | Porsche 1991cc F6 | 276 |
| 14 | **P** **1.15** | **55** | **(France) Société Automobiles**; **Alpine** | (France) **Jean-Pierre Nicolas** **(France) Jean-Claude Andruet** | Alpine A210 | Renault-Gordini 1005cc S4 | 272 |
| 15 | P 1.3 | 50 | (United Kingdom) Donald Healey Motor Company | (United Kingdom) Roger Enever (Republic of Ireland) Alec Poole | Austin-Healey Sprite Le Mans | BMC 1293cc S4 | 255 |
| N/C * | P 2.0 | 46 | Ecurie Fiat-Abarth France | (France) Marcel Martin (France) Jean Mésange | Fiat Dino | Ferrari 1986cc V6 | 253 |
| N/C * | GT; 1.3 | 61 (reserve) | (France) Ecurie Léopard | (France) Jacques Bourdon (France) Maurice Nussbaumer | Alpine A110 | Renault-Gordini 1296cc S4 | 215 |
| N/C * | GT; 1.3 | 51 | (France) B. Collomb (private entrant) | (France) Bernard Collomb (France) François Laccarrau | Alpine A110 | Renault-Gordini 1296cc S4 | 167 |

- 'Note *: Not Classified because Insufficient distance covered.

=== Did Not Finish ===
| Pos | Class | No | Team | Drivers | Chassis | Engine | Laps | Reason |
|---|---|---|---|---|---|---|---|---|
| DNF | P 3.0 | 24 | (France) Equipe Matra Sports | (France) Johnny Servoz-Gavin (France) Henri Pescarolo | Matra MS630 | Matra 3.0L V12 | 283 | Puncture/fire (22hr) |
| DNF | P 3.0 | 27 | (France) Ecurie Savin-Calberson | (Belgium) Mauro Bianchi (France) Patrick Depailler | Alpine A220 | Renault-Gordini 3.0L V8 | 257 | Brakes/accident (22hr) |
| DNF | P 2.0 | 45 | (France) J.-P. Hanrioud (private entrant) | (France) Jean-Pierre Hanrioud (Switzerland) André Wicky | Porsche 910 | Porsche 1991cc F6 | 248 | Rocker arm (24hr) |
| DNF | GT; 2.0 | 44 | (France) Auguste Veuillet | (France) Guy Chasseuil (France) Claude Ballot-Léna | Porsche 911 T | Porsche 1991cc F6 | 224 | Engine (24hr) |
| DNF | S 5.0 | 20 | (Switzerland) Scuderia Filipinetti | (Switzerland) Herbert Müller (United Kingdom) Jonathan Williams | Ferrari 250LM | Ferrari 3.3L V12 | 212 | Wheel bearing (18hr) |
| DNF | S 5.0 | 14 | (United States) North American Racing Team | (United States) Masten Gregory (United States) Charlie Kolb | Ferrari 250LM | Ferrari 3.3L V12 | 209 | Accident (18hr) |
| DSQ | S 2.0 | 42 | (France) C. Poirot (private entrant) | (France) Christian Poirot (France) Pierre Maublanc | Porsche 906 | Porsche 1991cc F6 | 202 | Pit violation (19hr) |
| DNF | P 3.0 | 29 | (France) Société Automobiles; Alpine | (France) Jean Guichet (France) Jean-Pierre Jabouille | Alpine A220 | Renault-Gordini 3.0L V8 | 185 | Electrics (16hr) |
| DNF | GT +2.0 | 4 | (Switzerland) Scuderia Filipinetti | (Switzerland) Jean-Michel Giorgi (France) Sylvain Garant | Chevrolet Corvette C3 | Chevrolet 7.0L V8 | 157 | Accident (14hr) |
| DNF | P 2.0 | 41 | (Italy) Autodelta SpA | (Italy) Nino Vaccarella (Italy) Giancarlo Baghetti | Alfa Romeo T33/2 | Alfa Romeo 1996cc V8 | 150 | Fuel pump (12hr) |
| DNF | P 3.0 | 35 | (Spain) A. Soler-Roig (private entrant) | (Spain) Alex Soler-Roig (Austria) Rudi Lins | Porsche 907LH | Porsche 2.2L F8 | 145 | Oil leak/camshaft (13hr) |
| DNF | S 5.0 | 6 | (United Kingdom) J. Epstein (private entrant) | (United Kingdom) Jackie Epstein (United Kingdom) Edward Nelson | Lola T70 Mk. III | Chevrolet 5.0L V8 | 143 | Final drive/camshaft (17hr) |
| DNF | S 5.0 | 12 | (United Kingdom) Strathaven Ltd | (United Kingdom) Mike Salmon (United Kingdom) Eric Liddell | Ford GT40 | Ford 4.7L V8 | 131 | Gearbox (19hr) |
| DNF | P 3.0 | 34 | (Germany) Porsche System Engineering | (United States) Joe Buzzetta (United States) Scooter Patrick | Porsche 908 LH | Porsche 3.0L F8 | 115 | Alternator (9hr) |
| DSQ | P 3.0 | 32 | (Germany) Porsche System Engineering | (West Germany) Gerhard Mitter (United Kingdom) Vic Elford | Porsche 908 LH | Porsche 3.0L F8 | 111 | Mechanical violation (9hr) |
| DNF | S 5.0 | 10 | (United Kingdom) JW Automotive Engineering | (Australia) Paul Hawkins (United Kingdom) David Hobbs | Ford GT40 | Ford 4.9L V8 | 107 | Engine (10hr) |
| DNF | P 2.0 | 37 | (Belgium) Racing Team VDS | (Belgium) Teddy Pilette (Netherlands) Rob Slotemaker | Alfa Romeo T33/2 | Alfa Romeo 1996cc V8 | 104 | Drive shaft (9hr) |
| DSQ | P 3.0 | 67 (reserve) | (France) P. Farjon | (France) Robert Buchet (West Germany) Herbert Linge | Porsche 907/8 | Porsche 2.2L F6 | 102 | Mechanical violation (9hr) |
| DNF | S 5.0 | 19 | (United Kingdom) P. Vestey (private entrant) | (United Kingdom) Paul Vestey (United States) Roy Pike | Ferrari 250LM | Ferrari 3.3L V12 | 99 | Gearbox (11hr) |
| DNF | P 3.0 | 22 | (United States) Howmet Corporation | (United States) Ray Heppenstal (United States) Dick Thompson | Howmet TX | Continental Turbine (3.0L equiv) | 84 | Accident (9hr) |
| DNF | GT +2.0 | 17 | (Switzerland) Scuderia Filipinetti | (Switzerland) Jacques Rey (Switzerland) Claude Haldi | Ferrari 275 GTB; Competizione | Ferrari 3.3L V12 | 78 | Accident (8hr) |
| DNF | P 1.15 | 56 | (France) Société Automobiles; Alpine | (France) Jean-Louis Marnat (France) Jean-François Gerbault | Alpine A210 | Renault-Gordini 1005cc S4 | 71 | Ignition (9hr) |
| DSQ | P 3.0 | 23 | (United States) Howmet Corporation | (United States) Bob Tullius (United Kingdom) Hugh Dibley | Howmet TX | Continental Turbine (3.0L equiv) | 60 | Insufficient distance (9hr) |
| DNF | P 3.0 | 31 | (Germany) Porsche System Engineering | (Switzerland) Jo Siffert (West Germany) Hans Herrmann | Porsche 908 | Porsche 3.0L F8 | 59 | Clutch (5hr) |
| DNF | P 3.0 | 28 | (France) Société Automobiles; Alpine | (France) Henri Grandsire (France) Gérard Larrousse | Alpine A220 | Renault-Gordini 3.0L V8 | 59 | Brakes/ Accident (7hr) |
| DNF | P 2.0 | 36 | (United States) North American Racing Team | (France) François Chevalier (France) Bernard Lagier de Giuseppe | Dino 206 S | Ferrari 1986cc V6 | 54 | Engine (7hr) |
| DNF | GT +2.0 | 3 | (Switzerland) Scuderia Filipinetti | (Italy) Umberto Maglioli (France) Henri Greder | Chevrolet Corvette C3 | Chevrolet 7.0L V8 | 53 | Head gasket (6hr) |
| DNF | P 2.0 | 49 | (United Kingdom) C. J. Lawrence (private entrant) | (United Kingdom) Chris Lawrence (United Kingdom) John Wingfield | Deep Sanderson 302 | Ford 1598cc S4 | 35 | Fuel injection (6hr) |
| DNF | GT; 2.0 | 60 (reserve) | (Switzerland) Wicky Racing Team | (West Germany) Willy Meier (France) Jean de Mortemart | Porsche 911 T | Porsche 1991cc F6 | 30 | Accident (3hr) |
| DNF | P 3.0 | 25 | (United Kingdom) J. Woolfe (private entrant) | (United Kingdom) John Woolfe (United Kingdom) Digby Martland | Chevron B12 | Repco 2,996cc V8 | 27 | Head gasket (3hr) |
| DNF | P 2.0 | 47 | (United Kingdom) Donald Healey Motor Company | (United Kingdom) Clive Baker (United Kingdom) Andrew Hedges | Healey SR | Coventry Climax 1968cc V8 | 20 | Clutch (3hr) |
| DNF | S 5.0 | 11 | (United Kingdom) JW Automotive Engineering | (Australia) Brian Muir (United Kingdom) Jackie Oliver | Ford GT40 | Ford 4.9L V8 | 15 | Accident/clutch (5hr) |
| DSQ | S 5.0 | 7 | (Sweden) Sportscars Unlimited | (Sweden) Ulf Norinder (Sweden) Sten Axelsson | Lola T70 Mk. III | Chevrolet 5.0 L V8 | 47 | Abandoned car (5hr) |
| DNF | P 2.0 | 65 (reserve) | (Belgium) Racing Team VDS | (Belgium) Serge Trosch (Austria) Karl von Wendt | Alfa Romeo T33/2 | Alfa Romeo 1996cc V8 | 7 | Conrod (2hr) |
| DNF | P 1.3 | 54 | (France) André Moynet (private entrant) | (France) Max Jean (France) René Ligonnet | Moynet XS | Simca 1204cc S4 | 6 | Oil pump (3hr) |
| DNF | S 5.0 | 8 | (Belgium) C. Dubois (private entrant) | (Belgium) Willy Mairesse (Belgium) “Beurlys” (Jean Blaton) | Ford GT40 | Ford 4.7L V8 used Ford 4.9L V8 | 0 | Accident (1hr) |

=== Did Not Start ===
| Pos | Class | No | Team | Drivers | Chassis | Engine | Reason |
|---|---|---|---|---|---|---|---|
| DNS | GT +2.0 | 5 | (Italy) Scuderia Sant’Ambroeus | (Italy) Giorgio Pianta (Italy) Enrico Pinto | Iso Rivolta GT | Chevrolet 5.4L V8 | Practice accident |
| DNQ | P 2.0 | 48 | (United Kingdom) Marcos Racing Ltd. | (United Kingdom) Jeremy ‘Jem’ Marsh (United Kingdom) John Quick | Marcos GT | Volvo B20 1998cc S4 | Did not qualify |
| DNQ | P 1.3 | 68 (reserve) | (France) H. Giraud (private entrant) | (France) Patrick Champin (France) Philippe Marchesi | Hrubon | Renault 1296cc S4 | Did not qualify |
| DNP | GT +2.0 | 15 | (United States) North American Racing Team | (United States) Bob Grossman (Switzerland) Edgar Berney | Ferrari 275 GTB; Competizione | Ferrari 3.3L V12 | Failed scrutineering |
| DNA | GT +2.0 | 1 | (United States) Sunray DX Oil Company | | Chevrolet Corvette C3 | Chevrolet 7.0L V8 | Withdrawn |
| DNA | GT +2.0 | 2 | (United States) Sunray DX Oil Company | | Chevrolet Corvette C3 | Chevrolet 7.0L V8 | Withdrawn |
| DNA | S 5.0 | 16 | (Switzerland) Scuderia Filipinetti | | Ferrari 275LM | Ferrari 3.3L V12 | Withdrawn |
| DNA | S 5.0 | 18 | (Switzerland) Scuderia Filipinetti | (Switzerland) Edgar Berney (Portugal) Francisco de Heredia | Ferrari 250LM | Ferrari 3.3L V12 | Withdrawn |
| DNA | P 3.0 | 26 | (Italy) Automobili Serenissima | (United Kingdom) Jonathan Williams | Serenissima Mk.168 | ATS 3.0L V8 | Withdrawn |
| DNA | P 2.0 | 45 | (Netherlands) B. Pon (private entrant) | (Netherlands) Ben Pon (Netherlands) Gijs van Lennep | Porsche 910 | Porsche 1991cc F6 | Withdrawn |

=== Class Winners ===
| Class | Prototype Winners | | Class | Sports Winners | | Class | GT Winners | |
|---|---|---|---|---|---|---|---|---|
| Prototype 5000 | #66 Porsche 907 LH | Steinemann / Spoerry | Sports 5000 | #9 Ford GT40 | Rodriguez / Bianchi | Grand Touring 2000 | no finishers | |
| Prototype 2000 | #39 Alfa Romeo T33/2 | Giunti / Galli | Sports 2000 | no finishers | | Grand Touring 2000 | #43 Porsche 911 T | Gaban / Schrick |
| Prototype 1600 | #57 Alpine A210 | LeGuellec / Serpaggi | Sports 1600 | no entrants | | Grand Touring 1600 | no entrants | |
| Prototype 1300 | #52 Alpine A210 | Thérier / Tramont | Sports 1300 | no entrants | | Grand Touring 1300 | no finishers | |
| Prototype 1150 | #55 Alpine A210 | Nicolas / Andruet * | Sports 1150 | no entrants | | Grand Touring 1150 | no entrants | |

- Note: setting a new Distance Record.

=== Index of Thermal Efficiency ===
| Pos | Class | No | Team | Drivers | Chassis | Score |
|---|---|---|---|---|---|---|
| 1 | P 1.3 | 52 | (France) Société Automobiles; Alpine | (France) Jean-Luc Thérier (France) Bernard Tramont | Alpine A210 | 1.16 |
| 2 | P 2.0 | 57 | (France) Ecurie Savin-Calberson | (France) Alain LeGuellec (France) Alain Serpaggi | Alpine A210 | 1.07 |
| 3 | P 1.3 | 53 | (France) Trophée Le Mans | (France) Bob Wollek (France) Christian Ethuin | Alpine A210 | 1.06 |
| 4 | S 5.0 | 9 | (United Kingdom) JW Automotive Engineering | (Mexico) Pedro Rodriguez (Belgium) Lucien Bianchi | Ford GT40 | 1.04 |
| 5 | P 1.15 | 55 | (France) Société Automobiles; Alpine | (France) Jean-Pierre Nicolas (France) Jean-Claude Andruet | Alpine A210 | 0.94 |
| 6= | P 1.3 | 50 | (United Kingdom) Donald Healey Motor Company | (United Kingdom) Roger Enever (Republic of Ireland) Alec Poole | Austin-Healey Sprite Le Mans | 0.91 |
| 6= | GT; 2.0 | 64 | (France) C. Laurent (private entrant) | (France) Claude Laurent (France) Jean-Claude Ogier | Porsche 911 T | 0.91 |
| 8 | P 2.0 | 39 | (Italy) Autodelta SpA | (Italy) Ignazio Giunti (Italy) Giovanni ‘Nanni’ Galli | Alfa Romeo T33/2 | 0.86 |
| 9= | P 3.0 | 66 | (Switzerland) Squadra Tartaruga | (Switzerland) Hans-Heinrich ‘Rico’ Steinemann (Switzerland) Dieter Spoerry | Porsche 907LH | 0.82 |
| 9= | P 3.0 | 33 | (Germany) Porsche System Engineering | (West Germany) Rolf Stommelen (West Germany) Jochen Neerpasch | Porsche 908LH | 0.82 |

- Note: Only the top ten positions are included in this set of standings.

=== Index of Performance ===
Taken from Moity's book.

| Pos | Class | No | Team | Drivers | Chassis | Score |
|---|---|---|---|---|---|---|
| 1 | P 1.15 | 55 | (France) Société Automobiles; Alpine | (France) Jean-Pierre Nicolas (France) Jean-Claude Andruet | Alpine A210 | 1.197 |
| 2 | P 2.0 | 39 | (Italy) Autodelta SpA | (Italy) Ignazio Giunti (Italy) Giovanni ‘Nanni’ Galli | Alfa Romeo T33/2 | 1.175 |
| 3 | P 3.0 | 66 | (Switzerland) Squadra Tartaruga | (Switzerland) Hans-Heinrich ‘Rico’ Steinemann (Switzerland) Dieter Spoerry | Porsche 907LH | 1.170 |
| 4 | P 1.3 | 52 | (France) Société Automobiles; Alpine | (France) Jean-Luc Thérier (France) Bernard Tramont | Alpine A210 | 1.159 |
| 5 | P 2.0 | 38 | (Italy) Autodelta SpA | (Italy) Carlo Facetti (Italy) Spartaco Dini | Alfa Romeo T33/2 | 1.149 |
| 6 | P 1.3 | 53 | (France) Trophée Le Mans | (France) Bob Wollek (France) Christian Ethuin | Alpine A210 | 1.136 |
| 7 | P 2.0 | 57 | (France) Ecurie Savin-Calberson | (France) Alain LeGuellec (France) Alain Serpaggi | Alpine A210 | 1.127 |
| 8 | P 3.0 | 33 | (Germany) Porsche System Engineering | (West Germany) Rolf Stommelen (West Germany) Jochen Neerpasch | Porsche 908LH | 1.117 |
| 9 | P 2.0 | 40 | (Italy) Autodelta SpA | (Italy) Mario Casoni (Italy) Giampiero Biscaldi | Alfa Romeo T33/2 | 1.113 |
| 10 | P 1.3 | 50 | (United Kingdom) Donald Healey Motor Company | (United Kingdom) Roger Enever (Republic of Ireland) Alec Poole | Austin-Healey Sprite Le Mans | 1.098 |

- Note: Only the top ten positions are included in this set of standings. A score of 1.00 means meeting the minimum distance for the car, and a higher score is exceeding the nominal target distance.

=== Statistics ===
Taken from Quentin Spurring's book, officially licensed by the ACO

- Fastest Lap in practice – J. Siffert, #31 Porsche 908 LH – 3:35.4secs; 225.11 km/h (139.88 mph)
- Fastest Lap – R. Stommelen, #33 Porsche 908 LH– 3:38.1secs; 222.32 km/h (138.14 mph)
- Winning Distance – 4,452.88 km (2,766.89 mi)
- Winner's Average Speed – 185.54 km/h (115.29 mph)
- Attendance – 300 000

=== International Championship for Makes Standings ===
As calculated after Le Mans, Round 10 of 10

| Pos | Manufacturer | Points |
|---|---|---|
| 1 | (United States) Ford | 45 |
| 2 | (West Germany) Porsche | 42 |
| 3 | (Italy) Alfa Romeo | 15½ |
| 4= | (France) Alpine | 4 |
| 4= | (United States) Chevrolet | 4 |
| 4= | (United States) Howmet | 4 |
| 7 | (Italy) Ferrari | 2 |
| 4 | (United Kingdom) Lola | 1 |

Citations
