= 2006 Formula Renault seasons =

2006 Formula Renault

Seasons
- ← 2005 2007 →

This page describe all the 2006 seasons of Formula Renault series.

== Formula Renault 2.0L ==
=== 2006 Championnat de France Formula Renault 2.0 season ===
- Point system : 15, 12, 10, 8, 6, 5, 4, 3, 2, 1 for 10th. In each race 1 point for Fastest lap and 1 for Pole position.

Pos	Driver	Team	(France) NOG April 16–17		(France) DIJ May 21–22		(France) PAU June 3–4		(France) VIE June 24–25		(France) ALB September 9–10		(France) LEM September 30	(France) MAG October 21–22		Points	Points (R)
Pos	Driver	Team	1	2	3	4	5	6	7	8	9	10	11	12	13?	Points	Points (R)
1	(France) Laurent Groppi	Graff Racing	2	1	3	2	1*	1	1*	1*	1*	2		26	7	140	
2	(France) Jean Karl Vernay	SG Formula	Ret	2*	1	Ret	2	Ret	5	2	2	5		2*	1*	108	129
3	(France) Julien Jousse	SG Formula	5	3	6	1*	3	11*	7	3	7	8		4	5	89	
4	(France) Johan Charpilienne	Pôle Services	1*	4	2	5	6	5	23	DNS	4	Ret		Ret	9	78	
5	(France) Nelson Panciatici	Epsilon Sport	6	11	10	10	8	3	3	8	3	1*		25	3	71	
6	(France) Julien Canal	Graff Racing	4	27	13	6	10	4	6	4	9	Ret		9	2	61	
7	(France) Mathieu Arzeno	Graff Racing	Ret	7	17	15	4	8	2	5	6	3		13	16	52	134
8	(Belgium) Bertrand Baguette	Epsilon Sport	Ret	15	4	3	7	10	4	11				5	4	48	
9	(France) Malo Olivier	Hexis Racing	9	5	8	12	Ret	6	8	7	5	4		8	11	41	
10	(France) Tom Dillmann	SG Formula	Ret	13	Ret	9	24	Ret					1	1	Ret	34	
11	(France) Franck Mailleux	Manor Motorsport			5*	4										28	
12	(France) Alexandre Marsoin	Epsilon Sport	3	9	15	14	11	12	11	DNS	11	6		7	6	26	111
13	(Netherlands) Carlo van Dam	SG Formula	22	Ret			9	2						3	25	25	
14	(France) Nicolas Navarro	SG Formula(1–8), MC Racing(−13)	8	6	7	7	5	Ret	15	14				12	14	25	
15	(France) Jean-Philippe Bournot	Graff Racing	10	10	11	Ret	16	9	9	6	8	13		19	12	17	110
16	(France) Thomas Accary	Pôle Services	7	8	Ret	DNS	12	7	10	Ret	20	10				20	
17	(Switzerland) Nicolas Maulini	NMRT	12	Ret	Ret	8	15	13						6	13	9	
18	(France) Damien Claverie	MC Racing	11	16	Ret	DNS	13	14			15	7				4	
19	(Switzerland) Jonathan Hirschi	SG Formula							19	DNS				17	8	3	
20	(Finland) Valle Mäkelä	Manor Motorsport			9	11										3	27
21	(France) Sylvain Milesi	Racing Team Trajectoire(1–8), Hexis Racing(9–13)	Ret	17					18	9	19	11		18	24	3	
22	(Bahrain) Salman Bin Rashid Al-Khalifa	Epsilon Sport	19	26	23	22	22	18	Ret	DNS				20	15	1	38
23	(France) Kevin van Heek	Graff Racing	14	14	12	DNS			14	10	12	Ret		16	Ret	1	51
24	(France) Guilhem Verdier	Pôle Services	17	23	Ret	19	Ret	19	20	19	17	12		23	23	1	54
25	(France) Michaël Rossi	Hexis Racing(1-), SG Formula	Ret	12	19	23	25	16	12	DNS	10	Ret		10	Ret	1	38
26	(France) Sébastien Chardonnet	Hexis Racing(1–8), Pôle Services(9–13)	Ret	21	16	13	14	17	12	17	13	Ret		15	17	0	63
27	(France) Eric Bergerot	Graff Racing	20	25	20	DNS	19	24	21	18	Ret	15		22	18	0	39
28	(France) Stéphane Freve	SCF Compétition	13	18	18	20	17	15	16	15						0	
29	(France) Rodolphe Hauchard	RBA Sport	21	24	21	18	20	22			16	14		24	22	0	
30	(France) Stéphanie Tesson	MC Racing	Ret	20	24	Ret	18	DNS	17	16				Ret	20	0	
31	(France) Mathieu Santi	MC Racing	15	19	Ret	21	21	20	22	20						0	
32	(United Kingdom) Adam Perkins	MC Racing	18	28	22	Ret	23	21	24	21						0	22
33	(France) Benjamin Rouget	Pôle Services	Ret	Ret	Ret	16	DNS	23								0	8
34	(China) Cong Fu Cheng	Manor Motorsport			14	17										0	
35	(France) Christophe Lefranc	Pôle Services							13	13						0	
36	(France) Daniel Harout	Lycée Pro Nogaro	16	22												0	
	(Switzerland) Didier Josseron	Jenzer Motorsport												21	19	0	
	(France) Ulric Amado	MC Racing									Ret	Ret		11	Ret	0	
	(France) Hugues Chabaud	RBA Sport									18	16				0	
	(France) Pierre Combot	Pôle Services														0	
	(Romania) Mihai Marinescu	Petrom District Racing												DNS	10	0	
	(France) Pierre-Brice Ména	Hexis Racing									14	9		14	26	0	
	(France) Claude Monteiro	Hexis Racing														0	
	(France) Jérôme Sornicle	RBA Sport														0	
	(Switzerland) Fabien Thuner	Jenzer Motorsport												Ret	21	0	

- (R) = Rookies drivers

Pos	Team	Points
1	SG Formula	239
2	Graff Racing	232
3	Epsilon Sport	141
4	Pôle Services	93
5	Hexis Racing	42
6	Manor Motorsport	31
7	NMRT	9
8	MC Racing	6
9	Racing Team Trajectoire	2
10	SCF Competition	0
11	RBA Sport	0
12	Lycée Pro Nogaro	0

=== 2006 Formula Renault 2.0 UK season ===
==== 2006 Formula Renault 2.0 UK Winter Series ====
The season include 20 rounds. The final standing was established with the best 18 results of the season.

- Point system : 32, 28, 25, 22, 20, 18, 16, 14, 12, 11, 10, 9, 8, 7, 6, 5, 4, 3, 2, 1 for 20th. In each race 2 points for Fastest lap.
- 2 races in each round between 30 miles (48 km) and 30 minutes.

This table shows final position, including non-MSA licence drivers that were ineligible to make final standing.

Pos	Driver	Team	(England) Brands Hatch Indy November 4–5		(England) Croft November 11–12		Points (1)
Pos	Driver	Team	1	2	3	4	Points (1)
1	(France) Franck Mailleux	Manor Motorsport	1	1*	1	1	130
2	(Republic of Ireland) Niall Breen	Fortec Motorsport	3*	2	8	3	94
3	(United Kingdom) Jordan Oakes	Eurotek Motorsport	5	3	3	8	86
4	(United Kingdom) Richard Singleton	RS Racing	4	EX	5	4	64
5	(United Kingdom) Riki Christodoulou	Fortec Motorsport	10	7	6	9	62
6	(United Kingdom) Richard Keen	Fortec Motorsport	2	13	Ret	5	58
7	(Brazil) Adriano Buzaid	AKA Lemac	7	11	Ret	2	58
8	(United States) Carl Skerlong	Fortec Motorsport	8	6	Ret	6	54
9	(United Kingdom) Alexander Sims	Manor Motorsport	Ret	5	2*	Ret	52
10	(United Kingdom) Adam Christodoulou	AKA Lemac	Ret	16	4	10*	43
11	(Brazil) Claudio Cantelli Jr.	Position 1 Racing	13	14	15	12	38
12	(Switzerland) Ronnie Theiler	Position 1 Racing	15	18	7	19	35
13	(Japan) Sho Hanawa	Mark Burdett Motorsport	19	9	19	14	34
14	(United Kingdom) Ryan Borthwick	Borthwick Motorsport	9	Ret	11	17	31
15	(United Kingdom) Hywel Lloyd	CF Racing	18	20	12	13	31
16	(United Kingdom) Jon Lancaster	AKA Lemac	23	8	21	16	30
17	(United Kingdom) Kris Loane	Coles Racing	16	15	13	20	29
18	(United Kingdom) Richard Kent	Mark Burdett Motorsport	12	Ret	9	Ret	23
19	(United Kingdom) Dean Stoneman	Falcon Motorsport	DNS	12	Ret	15	19
20	(United Kingdom) Emma Selway	Eurotek Motorsport	20	17	16	Ret	18
21	(Serbia) Neb Bursac	Hillspeed Racing	22	23	18	21	16
22	(United Kingdom) Ben Mason	Russell Racing	Ret	Ret	22	Ret	3
Non-MSA licence drivers with their original finish position :
NC	(Austria) Martin Ragginger	Mark Burdett Motorsport	6	4	14	7	–
NC	(Russia) Anton Nebylitskiy	SL Formula Racing	14	19	10	11	–
NC	(France) Michaël Rossi	SL Formula Racing	11	10	17	18	–
NC	(United States) Jeremy Braun	Manor Motorsport	17	21			–
NC	(Sweden) Piere Selander	SL Formula Racing	21	22	20	Ret	–

- (1) = Points include final positions without non-MSA licence drivers

=== 2006 Formula Renault BARC FR2000 season ===
The season included 12 rounds in 8 venues. The final standing was established with the best 11 results of the season. A Club Class classification is also established for young drivers (see 2006 Formula Renault BARC Club Class season below), they participated on the same race as the FR2000 series

- Point system : 15, 12, 10, 8, 6, 5, 4, 3, 2, 1 for 10th. In each race 1 point for Fastest lap and 1 point for Pole position.
- Races are between 30 miles (48 km) and 30 minutes.

Pos	Driver	Team	(England) SIL April 22	(England) SNE April 29	?		(England) SNE June 25		(England) OUL August 5	(Wales) PEM August 19–20		(England) THR September 16	?		Points (1)
Pos	Driver	Team	1	2	3	4	5	6	7	8	9	10	11	12	Points (1)
1	(United Kingdom) Richard Singleton	Richard Singleton Racing(1-?), Coles Racing(10?)	1*	7	1	2	3	3	1	3	1	2	1*	1*	154
2	(United Kingdom) Jordan Oakes	Eurotek Motorsport		1*	5	7	2	1*	2*	2	2*	1		DNS	109
3	(United Kingdom) James Littlejohn	Hillspeed	5	2	6	1	Ret	8	6	1	4	4	4	2	97
4	(United Kingdom) Ross Worswick	Worswick Engineering	3	4	Ret	5	1*	2	4	4	3		7	Ret	82
5	(United Kingdom) Hywel Lloyd	CF Racing	9	11	7	4	4	12	3	6	5	5	5	9	57
6	(United Kingdom) Craig Copeland	Mark Burdett Motorsport	Ret	8	3	Ret	10	13	8	8	6	3	10	5	44
7	(United Kingdom) Matt Shawyer	Russel Racing	2	3	4	6						6			40
8	(United Kingdom) David Scott	DS Motorsport	8	9	9	9	5	9	9	9	11	12	3	4	39
9	(United Kingdom) Thomas Arme	Mark Burdett Motorsport			2*	3*	7	11		7	8	11		8	38
10	(United Kingdom) Michael Broadhurst	Falcon Motorsport(1-?), Hillspeed(5?–10?)	4	5			8	7	15	5	9	8			32
11	(United Kingdom) Andrew Meyrick	Falcon Motorsport							5	10*	7	7*	2	Ret	30
12	(United Kingdom) Michael Vitulli	Vitulli Racing	6	13	8	8	Ret	4	12			9		Ret	21
13	(United Kingdom) Emma Selway	Mark Burdett Motorsport(3-?), Eurotek Motorsport(10?)					15	16	13	14	Ret	10	6	3	16
14	(France) Denis Autier	Mark Burdett Motorsport	7	10			12	6	7	12	Ret	Ret		10	15
15	(United Kingdom) Andrew Bentley	Russell Racing					9	5							8
16	(United Kingdom) Louis Hamilton-Smith	Jigsaw Engineering	Ret	12		Ret	14	10	Ret	15	13	18	9	6	8
17	(United Kingdom) James Green	Welch Motorsport	12	Ret	10		6	14	11						6
18	(United Kingdom) Felix Fisher	Driver	Ret	6			Ret	Ret							5
19	(United Kingdom) Chris Lamare	Macob Motorsport							10	11	12	14	Ret	7	5
20	(United Kingdom) Ryan Borthwick	Borthwick Motorsports										15	8		3
21	(United Kingdom) Chris Murray	Welch Motorsport	14	15		10	13	18		13	10	17			2
22	(France) Pierre Renom	Mark Burdett Motorsport	10	14			Ret	17	14			16		DNS	1
23	(United Kingdom) Martin Bloss	Russell Racing	11									13			0
24	(United Kingdom) Robin Palmer	Falcon Motorsport	Ret				16	19	15	16	14	20			0
25	(United Kingdom) Ben Mason	Russell Racing					11	15							0
26	(United Kingdom) Dean Stoneman	Falcon Motorsport										19			0
27	(United Kingdom) Gary Fletcher	Russell Racing										21			0
28	(United Kingdom) Simon Hill	?													0

- (1) = Points include only the best 11 results.

==== 2006 Formula Renault BARC Club Class season ====
The season include 12 rounds. The final standing was established with the best 11 results of the season. The Club Class category is raced in same time as the main Formula Renault BARC FR2000 series. The cars use Tatuus RC (97/98/99) or Mygale SJ99 chassis and are powered by Renault Laguna 2.0L 6 valves engine providing lower Horsepower than the FR2000 class.

- Point system : 15, 12, 10, 8, 6, 5, 4, 3, 2, 1. In each race 1 point for Fastest lap and 1 point for Pole position.
- Races are between 30 miles (48 km) and 30 minutes.

Pos	Driver	Team	Chassis	Points (1)
1	(United Kingdom) Ian Pearson	Driver	Tatuus	138
2	(United Kingdom) Mark Terry	Reon Motorsport	Tatuus	106
3	(United Kingdom) James Heffernan	JH Motorsport	Tatuus	105
4	(United Kingdom) Robert Pearson	Driver	Tatuus	84
5	(United Kingdom) Andrew Webb	Driver	Tatuus	62
6	(United Kingdom) Simon Keast	Annex Technology	Mygale	53
7	(United Kingdom) Adrian Dixon	Muzz Race	Mygale	51
8	(United Kingdom) Steve Hanselman	Muzz Race	Tatuus	33
9	(United Kingdom) Sarah Lambert	Muzz Race	Tatuus	27
10	(United Kingdom) Lee Larman	ACL Motorsport	Tatuus	26
11	(United Kingdom) Roberto Tirone	Muzz Race	Tatuus	9
12	(United Kingdom) Julie Clark	Reon Motorsport	Tatuus	0
13	(United Kingdom) Parna Kakhidze	Reon Motorsport	Tatuus	0

- (1) = Points include only the best 11 results.

Pos	Team	Points
1	Driver	284
2	Muzz Race	111
3	Reon Motorsport	106
4	JH Motorsport	105
5	Annex Technology	53
6	ACL Motorsport	26

=== 2006 Formula Renault 2.0 Italia season ===
- Point system : 30, 24, 20, 16, 12, 10, 8, 6, 4, 2 for 10th. In each race 2 point for Fastest lap and 2 for Pole position.
- Races : 2 race by rounds length of 30 minutes each.

Pos	Driver	Team	(Italy) MUG March 25–26		(Italy) VAL April 8–9		(Italy) IMO May 20–21		(Belgium) SPA June 3–4		(Germany) HOC July 8–9		(Italy) MIS July 22–23		(Italy) VAR September 16–17	(Italy) MNZ October 7–8		Points
Pos	Driver	Team	1	2	3	4	5	6	7	8	9	10	11	12	13	14	15	Points
1	(Spain) Dani Clos	Jenzer Motorsport	6	4	2	12	3	3	1	1	1	1	1	1	2	1	1	378
2	(South Africa) Adrian Zaugg	Cram Competition	1*	1	1	3	1	1	2	Ret	26	3	3	3	1	4	2	342
3	(Italy) Edoardo Piscopo	Cram Competition	3	2	3	5	2	2	24	2	25	4	2	2	4	2	3	256
4	(Italy) Edoardo Mortara	Prema Powerteam	2	3	4	20	Ret	6	3	7	5	14	9	7	7	16	5	144
5	(United Kingdom) Martin Plowman	Prema Powerteam	7	8	19	13	6	5	Ret	21	2	15	7	4	11	5	7	108
6	(Netherlands) Henkie Waldschmidt	Prema Powerteam	9	7	5	Ret	Ret	7	5	Ret	Ret	8	11	6	10	3	4	106
7	(Italy) Valentino Sebastiani	It Loox Racing	30	Ret	Ret*	1	26	11	4	Ret	8	10	4	9	6	8	11	92
8	(Italy) Niki Sebastiani	It Loox Racing	15	18	Ret	2	4	4	Ret	Ret	14	Ret	5	8	5	Ret	14	86
9	(Italy) Matteo Chinosi	RP Motorsport	8	9	8	6	7	9	7	19	3	5	13	13	Ret	Ret	15	80
10	(Spain) Jaime Alguersuari	Cram Competition	19	14	10	21	5	13	6	3	20	11	18	5	12	Ret	10	56
11	(Romania) Mihai Marinescu	AP Motorsport	11	12	12	Ret	9	28	Ret	Ret	4	2	15	11		Ret	9	50
12	(Netherlands) Junior Strous	Jenzer Motorsport	4	5	Ret	4							16	20				48
13	(Italy) Marco Frezza	Jenzer Motorsport	28	22	6	Ret	Ret	8	Ret	4	24	13	6	10				44
14	(Italy) Andrea Caldarelli	CO2 Motorsport	Ret	Ret	9	10	Ret	14	22	6	Ret	Ret	17	19	3	13	12	38
15	(Italy) Frederico Muggia	BVM Minardi Team	5	6	11	Ret	8	29										34
16	(Belgium) Jonathan Thonon	CO2 Motorsport	29	16	15	11	21	31	10	5	10	9	29	17	8	Ret	16	26
17	(Mexico) Pablo Sánchez López	BVM Minardi Team	18	11	7	Ret	18	12	23	Ret	9	Ret	19	16	9	6	Ret	26
18	(Switzerland) Rahel Frey	Jenzer Motorsport	10	10	13	9	19	10			Ret	12	8	23	15	Ret	8	24
19	(Italy) Filippo Ponti	Euronova Racing	14	26	27	8	15	15	9	9	7	Ret	14	Ret	Ret			22
20	(Argentina) Néstor Girolami	Jenzer Motorsport														7	6	18
21	(Austria) Walter Grubmüller	Jenzer Motorsport	Ret	25	16	19	16	Ret	15	8	23	6	10	24				18
22	(Spain) Oliver Campos-Hull	Facondini Racing	Ret	24	Ret	Ret	13	16	8	11	12	7	12	12				14
23	(Spain) Daniel Campos-Hull	Facondini Racing	Ret	Ret			Ret	24	16	Ret	6	Ret						10
24	(Italy) Riccardo Cinti	It Loox Racing	17	13	Ret	7	22	21	Ret	10	13	Ret	Ret	Ret	13	15	17	10
25	(Italy) Alberto Costa	Euronova Racing	13	Ret	25	Ret	10	19	Ret	14	Ret	20	Ret	26	Ret	9	Ret	6
26	(Argentina) Augusto Scalbi	Tomcat Racing													16	10	Ret	2
NC	(Italy) Andrea Pellizzato	Cram Competition	16	15	DNS	Ret	11	20	25	16	15	19	25	Ret	Ret	14	Ret	0
NC	(Italy) Carlo Alberto Vudafieri	Kiwi/Durango	Ret	Ret	20	Ret	Ret	26	21	Ret			22	Ret	19	22	25	0
NC	(Netherlands) Danny Bleek	RP Motorsport	27	Ret	24	Ret	23	30										0
NC	(Italy) Gregorio Baracchi	Cram Competition	25	Ret	26	Ret	Ret	Ret							20	19	Ret	0
NC	(Venezuela) Johnny Cecotto Jr.	Kiwi Esp	Ret	27	21	Ret												0
NC	(Italy) Michele Caliendo	Euronova Racing	26	Ret	23	18	Ret	Ret	19	21			23	27	21	21	23	0
NC	(Finland) Mikael Forsten	RP Motorsport	24	21	22	17	24	25	19	Ret	22	23			18	Ret	24	0
NC	(Italy) Niccolò Valentini	Kiwi/Durango	Ret	Ret			25	27	20	20			24	28		20	22	0
NC	(San Marino) Paolo Meloni	W&D Racing	20	19	28	16	17	18	11	15	18	18	27	21		Ret	20	0
NC	(Italy) Pasquale Di Sabatino	Tomcat Racing	12	Ret	14	Ret	27	32	12	Ret	16	22	20	14				0
NC	(Italy) Tobias Tauber	Tomcat Racing	23	20	17	15	20	22	18	17								0
NC	(Italy) Valerio Prandi	Viola Formula Racing	21	23	18	Ret	12	23	Ret	12	17	Ret	Ret	22	17	Ret	21	0
NC	(Italy) Frankie Provenzano	BVM Minardi Team	22	17	DNS	14	14	Ret	14	13	Ret	Ret	Ret	Ret				0
NC	(Argentina) Lucas Benamo	Jenzer Motorsport					Ret	17										0
NC	(Italy) Marco Mapelli	RP Motorsport							21	13	21	16	26	15	14	Ret	27	0
NC	(Italy) Daniel Zampieri	BVM Minardi Team							17	18	11	17	Ret	18	Ret	12	13	0
NC	(Italy) Andrea Pellegrino	Tomcat Racing											21	25	Ret			0
NC	(Italy) Pietro Gandolfi	BVM Minardi Team											28	29	Ret	23	26	0
NC	(Italy) Cristian Corsini	Tomcat Racing														11	18	0
NC	(Italy) Ricciardo Azzoli	Viola Formula														17	19	0
NC	(Italy) Gianluca Colombo	Tomcat Racing														18	Ret	0

Pos	Team	Points
1	Cram Competition	674
2	Jenzer Motorsport	518
3	Prema Powerteam	358
4	IT Loox Racing	188
5	RP Motorsport	78
6	CO2 Motorsport	64
7	BVM Minardi	56
8	AP Motorsport	48
9	Euronova Racing	30
10	Facondini Racing	26
11	Tomcat Racing	2

==== 2006 Formula Renault 2.0 Italia Winter Series ====
- Point system : 32, 28, 24, 22, 20, 18, 16, 14, 12, 10, 8, 6, 4, 2, 1 for 15th. In each race 2 point for Fastest lap and 2 for Pole position.
- Races : 2 race by rounds length of 30 minutes each.

Pos	Driver	Team	(Italy) VAL November 11–12		(Italy) VAL November 18–19		Points
Pos	Driver	Team	1	2	3	4	Points
1	(Spain) Jaime Alguersuari	Cram Competition	1	1	1	1	142
2	(Italy) Frankie Provenzano	BVM Minardi	2	2	3	4	102
3	(Spain) Roberto Merhi	It Loox Racing	3	7	2	3	92
4	(Italy) Mirko Bortolotti	RP Motorsport	8	4	4	2	88
5	(Italy) Michele Faccin	CO2 Motorsport	5	12	6	5	64
6	(Italy) Riccardo Cinti	It Loox Racing	10	3	9	7	62
7	(Spain) Aleix Alcaraz	Cram Competition	11	5	5	9	60
8	(Ecuador) Sebastián Merchán	Facondini Racing	6	9	7	8	60
9	(Italy) Nicola de Marco	Durango	9	8	8	10	50
10	(Italy) Daniel Zampieri	BVM Minardi	4	21	10	6	50
11	(France) Cédric Sbirrazzuoli	Durango	12	6	16	12	30
12	(Ecuador) Henry Taleb jr.	Facondini Racing	7	22	12	20	22
13	(Bulgaria) Simeon Ivanov	CO2 Motorsport	19	10	13	11	22
14	(Romania) Matei Mihaescu	CO2 Motorsport	13	13	11	19	16
15	(Italy) Federico Leo	RP Motorsport	14	11	Ret	13	14
16	(Italy) Marco Visconti	Dynamic Engineering			14	14	4
17	(Italy) Alessia Belometti	AP Motorsport	21	14	Ret	18	2
18	(Belgium) Jonathan Dhaese	CO2 Motorsport	15	15			2
19	(Italy) Alberto Bassi	Dynamic Engineering	17	17	15	21	1
20	(Austria) Bianca Steiner	Steiner	Ret	23	Ret	15	1
NC	(Italy) Nicola Zonzini	RP Motorsport	16	20	17	16	0
NC	(Italy) Andrea Roda	Tomcat Racing	22	16	Ret	23	0
NC	(Italy) Natale Marzullo	It Loox Racing	20	18	19	17	0
NC	(Italy) Giovanni Nava	Cram Competition	18	19	18	22	0

=== 2006 PanamGPSeries Formula Renault 2000 de America season ===
- Point system : 30, 24, 20, 16, 12, 10, 8, 6, 4, 2 for 10th. Extra 2 points for Fastest lap and 2 points for Pole position.

The series reward also the best Rookie (N) driver. Citizen-MM-Exxxess win the team championship.

Pos	Driver	Team	(Guatemala) VOL May 14	(Costa Rica) GUA May 28	(Venezuela) TUR June 18	(Colombia) TOC July 30	(Ecuador) YAH August 13	(Mexico) PUE October 28–29		(Mexico) AGU November 25	(Mexico) GUA December 16–17		Points	Points (N)
Pos	Driver	Team	1	2(*?)	3	4	5	6	7(*?)	8	9(*?)	10(*?)	Points	Points (N)
1	(Mexico) Homero Richards	Cisma Estral	18	3	2	2*	1*	12	DNS	1	1	11	176	
2	(Mexico) Hugo Oliveras	FedEx Citizen	14	1	1	6	8	Ret*	1*	Ret	2	13	142	
3	(Mexico) Arturo Hernández	Rayban Zucaritas	6	2	3	11	3	8	6	5	10	2	130	
4	(Mexico) Diego Fernández	FedEx Citizen	5*	6	Ret	Ret	5	1	2	Ret	Ret	3	112	
5	(Venezuela) Bruno Rene Orioli (N)	Plastiven		5	5*	1	Ret	Ret	5	7	6	DSQ	90	160
6	(Costa Rica) Charly Fonseca	Hipermas Motorsport	2	4	15	12	Ret	2	4	Ret			80	
7	(Colombia) Mauricio Borrero	GP Roshfrans	3	21	4	3	13	5	Ret	9	11	10	76	
8	(Mexico) Arturo González (N)	Cisma Astral	9	18	9	4	Ret	10	7	2	5	9	74	166
9	(Colombia) Omar Leal (N)	Penix Unico				13	12	4	3	3	4	14	72	134
10	(Ecuador) Sebastián Merchán (N)	Team Ecuador	11	10	10	5	2	3	8				68	136
11	(Mexico) Oscar Hidalgo	Daewoo(2), Freightliner(5–10)		19			14	14	10	4*	3	1	68	
12	(Mexico) Juan Pablo Garcia	Freightliner	1	12	7	Ret							44	
13	(Mexico) Alfonso Toledano Jr. (N)	VSonic(1–5), Seguros Cumbre(6–10)	4	Ret	8	10	Ret	9	15	Ret	Ret	6	38	136
14	(Mexico) Pablo Cervantes	Daewoo	Ret	20	11	19	11	7	9	10	7	4	38	
15	(Mexico) Martín Fuentes (N)	Grupo Cinag RioDiver	19	14	Ret	17	6	Ret	12	8	9	5	32	116
16	(Mexico) David Farias (N)	Daewoo	7		12	14	9	Ret	Ret	6	Ret	8	28	114
17	(Colombia) Felipe Merjech (N)	GP Roshfrans	DNS	Ret	4	7	4						24	52
18	(Ecuador) Henry Taleb (N)	Team Ecuador	8	7	Ret	16	10						16	58
19	(Venezuela) Giancarlo Serenelli (N)	Colombus			6	9	15						14	32
20	(Mexico) Xavier Razo	Peveroll						6	11				10	
21	(Mexico) Javier Alarcón	no team name	13	16	13	15	7	13	14				8	
22	(Mexico) Gerardo I. Gonzalez (N)	Simsa Estral									12	7	8	32
23	(Costa Rica) Daniel Muñiz (N)	Team Costa Rica		8									6	20
24	(Venezuela) Alexandro Popow (N)	Seniat			16	8	Ret	11	13				6	46
25	(Mexico) Israel Jaitovich	Motormaster	Ret	9	Ret	Ret	Ret						4	
26	(Guatemala) Diego Cuestas	Movistar Tefrateli	10										2	
27	(Ecuador) Cristian Taleb (N)	Team Ecuador5				Ret	Ret						0	0
28	(Guatemala) Carlos Zaid	Cofiansa	Ret										0	
29	(Costa Rica) Emilio Valverde (N)	Glade Clip Ons Sport	Ret	13	Ret	18							0	20
30	(Guatemala) George Hazbun (N)	Team Guatemala	16										0	8
31	(Panama) Oscar Terán	Team Pnanamá	12	Ret									0	
32	(Guatemala) Estuardo Gamalero (N)	Honda Losebuines	15										0	10
33	(Mexico) Jorge Seman (N)	Seman Racing		DNS									0	0
34	(Costa Rica) Andre Solano	Team Costa Rica		17									0	
35	(Costa Rica) Juan Ignacio Sansó	Team Costa Rica		11									0	
36	(Venezuela) Rafael Gruszka (N)	Valeven		15	Ret	Ret							0	10
NC	(Mexico) Daniel Forcadell (N)	Autolavado Forca								Ret			0	?
NC	(Colombia) Juliana González (N) (1)	Colombia				Ret					8	12	0	?
NC	(Ecuador) Patricio Larrea (N)	Auto Francia					Ret						0	?
NC	(Mexico) Ivan Ramos	Rayban Zucaritas						Ret	Ret				0	?
NC	(Colombia) Juan Manuel González	Zeus Unico								Ret			0	?
NC	(Venezuela) Ivan González	no team name								Ret			0	?
NC	(Mexico) Adrian González	Rayban Zucaritas								Ret			0	?
NC	(Venezuela) Gustavo Maldonado	no team name								Ret			0	?
NC	(Colombia) Juan Estebán Jacobo	GP Roshfrans										Ret	0	?

- (1) = Juliana González results doesn't count for championship.

=== 2006 Formula Renault 2.0 Brazil season ===
This is the last season of the Brazilian Formula Renault series. The series is held on the Renault Speed Show weekends.

- Point system : 30, 24, 20, 16, 12, 10, 8, 6, 4, 2 for 10th. 1 point for Pole position and 1 point for Fastest lap.

Pos	Driver	Team	(Brazil) CUR March 25–26		(Brazil) CAM May 13–14		(Brazil) BRA June 3–4		(Brazil) TAR July 15–16		(Brazil) CUR August 19–20	(Brazil) VIT September 10	(Brazil) SAO October 21–22	(Brazil) SAO November 25–26		Points
Pos	Driver	Team	1	2	3	4	5	6	7	8	9	10	11	12	13	Points
1	(Brazil) Felipe Lapenna	Full Time Sports	2	1	2	1*	1	2	6	1	2	2	14	1	14	283
2	(Brazil) Douglas Soares	PropCar Racing	3	Ret	1	2	7	4	5	3	1		Ret	2*	6	198
3	(Brazil) Vinicius Quadros	Bassani Racing	1*	Ret	3	3	5	5	2	14*	3	7	7	9	4	179
4	(Brazil) Galid Osman	Full Time Sports	Ret	Ret	7	Ret	?	Ret	8	2	4*	5	2		1	124
5	(Brazil) Mario Romancini	Full Time Sports		2	10	8		6		6	5		1	4	5	123
6	(Brazil) Eduardo Santos	Dragão Motorsport	4				3	1	4	4		8				105
7	(Brazil) Sérgio Alves	Full Time Sports	7	5	6	6	8	7	?	7	10	10	4	7		93
8	(Brazil) Carlos Henrique Rosin	Eng Makers	Ret	8	Ret	Ret	10		1	Ret	8		Ret	3	2	88
9	(Brazil) Claudio Cantelli Jr.	Dragão Motorsport, Cesário F.Renault	5	4	Ret*	14	2	3	Ret	Ret			6			85
10	(Brazil) William Starostik	Gramacho Racing	6	3	4	5					Ret		5			70
11	(Brazil) Cairo Campos	Gramacho Racing			8	4	4		EX	15	Ret	3	15	5		70
12	(Brazil) Ernesto Otero	Adelaide / Nacional		Ret	Ret	Ret	Ret	10	10	5	7		3		3	64
13	(Brazil) Bruno Barbosa	PropCar Racing	8	7	Ret	10	6	8	3	Ret	13	6				52
14	(Brazil) Rodolpho Santos	Bassani Racing	9	Ret	5	9	9	Ret	7	8	11		Ret	8	Ret	44
15	(Brazil) Felipe Ferreira	Cesário F.Renault		6	11	11	Ret	9	9	13			8	6	8	40
16	(Brazil) Diego Nunes	Bassani Racing										1*				32
17	(Brazil) Rodrigo Barbosa	J. David Racing	Ret		12	12		Ret	Ret	12	9		10		Ret	16
18	(Brazil) Gustavo Foizer	Cesário F.Renault										4				16
19	(Brazil) Pedro Ferreira				9	7										12
20	(Brazil) Pedro Nunes	Piquet Sports, Dragão Motorsport									6					10
21	(Brazil) Marco Santos	Dragão Motorsport										9	9		13	8
22	(Brazil) Leonardo Otero	PropCar Racing													7	8
23	(Brazil) Leonardo de Souza	Eng Makers			13	13				9	14		11	10		6
24	(Brazil) Guga Campedelli	Piquet Sports		9				Ret								4
25	(Brazil) Denis Navarro														9	4
26	(Brazil) Fernando Galera	PropCar Racing, Cesário F.Renault	10	?							12		13			3
27	(Brazil) Ivan Rossoni	Gramacho Racing								10	15					2
28	(Brazil) Michel Noris	Adelaide / Nacional	Ret	10							Ret		12			2
29	(Brazil) Marconi Abreu	Cesário F.Renault			Ret	Ret		Ret								0
30	(Brazil) Ramon Matias	Cesário F.Renault								11						0
nc	(Brazil) Nathan Silva														12	0
nc	(Brazil) Anderson Faria	Cesário F.Renault													Ret	0
nc	(Brazil) André Gouvea	Eng Makers			Ret	Ret	EX	Ret								0
nc	(Brazil) Caio Costa												Ret			0
nc	(Brazil) Anderson Moraes												Ret			0

=== 2006 Formula TR 2000 Pro Series season ===
The Formula TR 2000 Pro Series is held with the Formula TR 1600 Pro Series. The same point system is used.

Pos	Driver	Team	Points
1	(United States) Carl Skerlong	Team Odyssey	963
2	(United States) John Knudsen	Knudsen Racing	797
3	(United States) Bret MacDonald	CT Motorsport	621
4	(United States) Dominic Scheer	Knudsen Racing	438
5	(United States) Paul Mashouf		416
6	(United States) Bob Siska	Siska Racing	336
7	(United States) Dustin Welch	Welch Racing	309
8	(United States) Dino Bruno	Team Bruno	226
9	(United States) Derek DeBoer	Welch Racing	196
10	(United States) Jeremy Braun		130
11	(Canada) Adam Davis		124

=== 2006 Asian Formula Renault Challenge season ===
- Point system : 30, 24, 20, 17, 15, 13, 11, 9, 7, 5, 4, 3, 2, 1 for 14th. No points for Fastest lap or Pole position. Drivers to late involvement don't receive any points for the final standing. The team point attribution is different from the driver point system : 10, 8, 6, 5, 4, 3, 2, 1.
- Races : 2 races by rounds.

The China Formula Renault Challenge (C) reward the best driver including only rounds held on China. The table indicate the final position of the race including all drivers and categories but total points are based on results according to participating categories of each driver.

The two first rounds (a and b) are supporting races for the China venue in the 2005–06 A1 Grand Prix Series. These rounds don't rewards any points for the championship. On May 28, the Zhuhai venue held only one of the 2 planned rounds. The cancelled round 5 was held on December 17, as season final round 13.

This table indicate the race original finish positions meanwhile the point standing include only the 10 best results and the eligible point drivers (excluding from results the late involvement driver in the championship).

Pos	Driver	Team	(China) SHA April 1 (1)		(China) SHA March 11–12		(China) ZHU April 8–9		(China) ZHU May 28	(Malaysia) SEP June 24–25		(China) SHA August 27		(China) SHA September 17		(China) ZHU December 17	Points (2)	Points (C)
Pos	Driver	Team	a	b	1	2	3	4	6	7	8	9	10	11	12	13	Points (2)	Points (C)
1	(Finland) Pekka Saarinen	Shangsai FRD Team			Ret	1*	Ret	8	1	1	1*	2	3*	1*	1*	1*	263	145
2	(Switzerland) Alexandre Imperatori	Asia Racing Team			2*	7	2*	1*	Ret	2*	2	3	2*	2	2	3	238	181
3	(Malaysia) Jazeman Jaafar	Asia Racing Team			5	11	4	4	5	3	3	5	4	3	Ret	2	182	107
4	(Finland) Henri Karjalainen	Asia Racing Team			7	3	1	2	11*	5	5	6	5	5	Ret	6	173	130
5	(Hong Kong) Jim Ka To	Shangsai FRD Team	Ret	3	1	2			Ret	10	6	1	1	4	3		169	151
6	(Japan) Takuya Nishitani	Champ Motorsport			3	5	3	3	4	4	4						126	75
7	(Australia) Mark Williamson	Dyna Ten Motorsports			6	6	5	10	Ret	8	7	8	6	10	7		105	98
8	(Hong Kong) Geoffrey Kwong	Shangsai FRD Team	10	7	14	15	12	14	10	11	10	12	12	11	8	9	61	49
9	(Indonesia) Zahir Ali	Asia Racing Team					Ret	9	3	9	9					4	58	0
10	(Thailand) Robert Chawakij Boughey	M3-Prema Formula Racing Team								6	8	Ret	9	6	4		50	
11	(Netherlands) Francis Tjia	Shangsai FRD Team	5	5			7	11	Ret	7	Ret	7	13				46	38
12	(China) Jin Zhang	Asia Racing Team					Ret	7	6	Ret	Ret	16	Ret	9	Ret		38	28
13	(Austria) Christopher Zöchling	Shangsai FRD Team			Ret	8	6	5									37	37
14	(South Korea) You Kyoung-Ouk	Person's Racing Shangsai FRD	1	2	4	4											34	34
15	(China) Jian-Wei Wang	M3-Prema Formula Racing Team								12	11	Ret	DNS	8	6		33	
16	(United Kingdom) Matt Shawyer	Champ Motorsport							2								24	
17	(Canada) Wayne Shen	Shangsai FRD Team	4	4	11	10	Ret	Ret	Ret	14	16	9	16				24	24
18	(Israel) Eitan Zidkilov	Dyna Ten Motorsports			Ret	16	8	13								7	23	0
19	(Indonesia) Haridarma Mamoppo	Shangsai FRD Team					9	6									20	0
20	(Canada) Christian Chia	Shangsai FRD Team					11	15		13	12	17	18			Ret	19	7
21	(Hong Kong) Michael Choi	Team Richard Mille – DTM			9	Ret			7								18	0
22	(Hong Kong) Adderly Fong	Champ Motorsport			12	13	10	12	13			14	10	7	5	5	17	66
23	(Canada) John Shen	Shangsai FRD Team	12	Ret	Ret	18	13	17	12	16	17	18	19	Ret	Ret		15	18
24	(Indonesia) Alexandra Asmasoebrata	Indonesia Inc. Racing Team							15	17	Ret	Ret	21	Ret	9		14	
25	(Hong Kong) On Chia	Shangsai FRD Team	3	13	13	9			Ret								10	10
26	(Italy) Giuseppe Terranova	M3-Prema Formula Racing Team							8								9	
27	(China) Jia Xu	M3-Prema Formula Racing Team	8	10	8	Ret											9	9
28	(Indonesia) Danindro Arioninditi	Shangsai FRD Team			10	12											8	10
29	(Taiwan) Jeffrey Lee	Champ Motorsport							9			Ret	Ret				7	
30	(Canada) Ross Lau	Champ Motorsport	9	8			15	Ret	19	Ret	Ret	20	20				5	0
31	(Taiwan) Chia Ming Kuo	M3-Prema Formula Racing Team	6	11	15	14	Ret	Ret									3	2
32	(Hong Kong) Douglas Moore	Asia Racing Team					14	16									2	0
33	(Hong Kong) Yuk Lung Siu	Champ Motorsport							14	18	14						2	
34	(Hong Kong) Kenneth Ma	Shangsai FRD Team								15	13						2	
35	(Hong Kong) Victor Yung	Shangsai FRD Team	13	12	16	19			16			21	22				1	0
36	(Taiwan) Po Heng Lin	Champ Motorsport										4	7				0	0
37	(Hong Kong) David Louie	Shangsai FRD Team										10	8				0	0
38	(Hong Kong) Stephen Chau	Shangsai FRD Team										13	11				0	0
39	(Hong Kong) Andrew Lo	Ghiasports Racing Team										11	14				0	0
40	(Taiwan) Jimmy Lin	Dyna Ten Motorsports										15	Ret				0	0
41	(Taiwan) Wei Liang Chen	Shangsai FRD Team										19	15				0	0
42	(Canada) Lachlan Campbell	Shangsai FRD Team							17	19	Ret						0	
43	(Sweden) Sebastian Hohenthal	M3-Prema Formula Racing Team							Ret								0	
44	(Switzerland) Mathias Beche	Asia Racing Team							Ret								0	
45	(Taiwan) Fisher Ger	Asia Racing Team					16	18									0	0
46	(Angola) Luís Sá Silva	Asia Racing Team							20								0	
47	(Hong Kong) Tit Lung Siu	Champ Motorsport							Ret	20	15						0	
48	(South Korea) Tom Kim	Asia Racing Team							18								0	
49	(Netherlands) Marcel Tjia	Shangsai FRD Team								Ret	18	22	Ret				0	
50	(Canada) Samson Chan	Ghiasports Racing Team										Ret	17				0	0
51	(Argentina) Maximiliano Baumgartner	M3-Prema Formula Racing Team														Ret	0	
52	(Japan) Yuki Iwasaki	Dyna Ten Motorsports Ltd														8	0	
53	(Hong Kong) Kenneth Lau	Team Richard Mille – DTM			Ret	17			Ret								0	0
NC	(Italy) Andrea Caldarelli	M3-Prema Formula Racing Team	2*	1*													–	
NC	(Hong Kong) Henry Lee	Shangsai FRD Team	7	6													–	
NC	(Hong Kong) Ka Lok Chin	Shangsai FRD Team	12	9													–	

- (1) = Rounds a and b do not award points.
- (2) = Final standing include only the best 10 results.
- (C) = China Formula Renault Challenge category.

Pos	Team	Points	Points (C)
1	Asia Racing Team	104	70
2	Shangsai FRD Team	101	72
3	Champ Motorsport	65	47
4	Dyna Ten Motorsports	55	40
5	M3-Prema Formula Racing Team	54	14
6	Indonesia Inc. Racing Team	22	0
7	Person's Racing Shangsai FRD	11	11
8	Team Richard Mille – DTM	9	0
8	Ghiasports Racing Team	0	0

== Formula Renault 1.6L ==
=== 2006 Championnat de France FFSA Formule Campus Renault Elf season ===
- Point system : ?

All drivers use the La Fillière car. The championship is held on various French circuits:

1–2. Circuit Paul Armagnac (April 16–17)
3–4. Circuit de Lédenon (April 29–30)
5–6. Dijon-Prenois (May 20–21)
7–8. Circuit de Pau (June 4–5)
9–10. Circuit du Val de Vienne (June 24–25)
11–12. Circuit Bugatti du Mans (September 30 – October 1)
13–14. Circuit de Nevers Magny-Cours (October 21–22)

Pos	Driver	Team	Points
1	(France) Kévin Estre		195
2	(France) Tristan Vautier		195
3	(France) Charles Pic		162
4	(France) Edouard Texte		78
5	(France) Charles-Edouard Champain		65
6	(France) Nelson Lukes		57
7	(France) Bastien Borget		50
8	(United Arab Emirates) Faisal Al Redha		49
9	(France) Nicolas Marroc		44
10	(France) Benjamin Lariche		43
11	(France) Charles-Emmanuel Grouberman		35
12	(France) Damien Chanard		24
13	(United Arab Emirates) Mohammed Al Kamda		23
14	(France) Stéphane Romecki		17
15	(United Arab Emirates) Hasher Al Maktoum		9
16	(France) Mathieu Cambou		7
17	(France) Julien Rabineau		5
18	(France) Jean Sourbé		4
19	(France) Anthony Comas		3
20	(France) Sylvain Roland		2

=== 2006 Formula Renault 1.6 Belgium season ===
- Each round duration is 20 minutes.
- Point system : 20, 17, 15, 13, 11, 10, 9, 8, 7, 6, 5, 4, 3, 2, 1 for 15th. Extra 1 point for Fastest lap and 2 points for Pole position.

Pos	Driver	Team	Points
1	(United Kingdom) Craig Dolby	Team Astromega	204
2	(France) Pierre Combot	Thierry Boutsen Racing	162
3	(Belgium) Julien Schroyen	DKR Engineering	140
4	(Belgium) Maxime Martin	Thierry Boutsen Racing	123
5	(Belgium) Ludovic Sougnez	Totokata Racing	119
6	(Belgium) Alexandre Marissal	DKR Engineering	116
7	(Belgium) Niels Cox	Marc Goosens Motorsport	101
8	(Netherlands) David Hauser	Racing Experience	97
9	(Belgium) Yves van Nijen	Marc Goosens Motorsport	87
10	(Netherlands) Gary Hauser	Racing Experience	67
11	(Belgium) Jamie Smets	Delahaye Racing Team	60
12	(Monaco) Stéphane Richelmi	Thierry Boutsen Racing	56
13	(Belgium) Eddy Roosens	Speed Racing	52
14	(Netherlands) Frank Suntjens	Speed Lover	41
15	(Latvia) Karlīne Štāla	MRD Motorsport Europe	38
16	(Belgium) Michael Leenders		27
17	(Belgium) Jean-Baptiste Malherbe	Racing Spirit	27
18	(Belgium) Nicolas de Crem	Marc Goosens Motorsport	27
19	(Netherlands) Michel Kolen	Stroek Motorsport	17
20	(Belgium) Edouard Mondron	Speed Racing	14
21	(Spain) Siso Cunill		1
NC	(Italy) Alessia Belometti	AP Motorsport	0
NC	(Romania) Doru Sechelariu	Thierry Boutsen Racing	0

Pos	Team	Points
1	Thierry Boutsen Racing	341
2	DKR Engineering	256
3	Marc Goosens Motorsport	215
4	Team Astromega	204
5	Racing Experience	164
6	Totokata Racing	119
7	Speed Racing	66
8	Delahaye Racing Team	60
9	Speed Lover	41
10	MRD Motorsport Europe	38
11	Racing Spirit	27
12	Stroek Motorsport	17
13	AP Motorsport	0

=== 2006 Formula Junior 1.6 Italia powered by Renault season ===
This is the last season of the Formula Junior 1.6 powered by Renault in Italy. In 2007, cars were powered by a Fiat engine and recalled Formula Monza 1.6.

- Point system : 20, 17, 15, 13, 11, 10, 9, 8, 7, 6, 5, 4, 3, 2, 1 for 15th. Extra 1 point for Fastest lap and 2 points for Pole position.

Pos	Driver	Team	Points
1	(Argentina) Augusto Scalbi	Tomcat Racing	302
2	(Italy) Federico Rossi	Tomcat Racing	158
3	(Italy) Alberto Bassi	Dynamic Engineering	136
4	(Italy) Marco Visconti	Dynamic Engineering	96
5	(Italy) Alessia Belometti	AP Motorsport	86
6	(Italy) Giovanni Nava	It Loox Racing	76
7	(Italy) Ronnie Valori	M&C Motorsport	66
8	(Belgium) Eddy Roosen	Speed Racing	64
9	(Austria) Bianca Steiner	Szasz Motorsport	56
10	(Italy) Christian De Francesch	PSR Motorsport, BVM Minardi Jr.	56
11	(Italy) Massimiliano Colombo	PSR Motorsport	52
12	(Italy) Federico Leo	Emmegi Promotion	50
13	(Italy) Mirko Bortolotti	AP Motorsport	40
14	(Netherlands) Frank Suntjens	Speed Lover	26
15	(Italy) Adriano Bernazzani	AP Motorsport	16
16	(Italy) Mirco Merlin	BVM Racing	16
17	(Italy) Federico Porri	Keks Motorsport	14
18	(Italy) Antonio Loprieno		10
19	(Italy) Alessandro Perciballi	Dynamic Engineering	6
20	(Italy) Giorgio Ferri	Keks Motorsport	4
21	(Italy) Andrea Roda		2

Pos	Team	Points
1	Tomcat Racing	
2	Dynamic Engineering	
3	AP Motorsport	
4	It Loox Racing	
5	M&C Motorsport	
6	Speed Racing	
7	Szasz Motorsport	
8	PSR Motorsport	
9	Emmegi Promotion	
10	Speed Lover	
11	BVM Racing	
12	Keks Motorsport	
13	BVM Minardi Jr.	

=== 2006 Formula Renault 1.6 Argentina season ===
The 2006 season include 13 venues.

- Point system : 20, 15, 12, 10, 8, 6, 4, 3, 2, 1 for 10th. 1 extra point for Pole position. 1 point for start in each race.

Pos	Driver	Team	Points
1	(Argentina) Mariano Werner		175
2	(Argentina) Néstor Girolami		126
3	(Uruguay) José Pedro Passadore		85
4	(Argentina) Matias Munoz Marchesi		81
5	(Argentina) Mariano Ponce de León		81
6	(Argentina) Guido Falaschi		72
7	(Argentina) Maximiliano Baumgartner		72
8	(Argentina) Kevin Icardi		67
9	(Argentina) Roberto Luna		67
10	(Argentina) Ezequiel Tudesco		66
11	(Argentina) Mauro Giallombardo		56
12	(Argentina) Bernardo Llaver		47
13	(Argentina) Aimar, M.		39
14	(Chile) Javier Valdebenito		36
15	(Argentina) Facundo Crovo		33
16	(Argentina) Humbert, J.		33
17	(Argentina) Francisco Viel Bugliotti		30
18	(Argentina) Damián Fineschi		29
19	(Argentina) Francisco Troncoso		29
20	(Argentina) Sanchez, G.		29
21	(Argentina) Blachowicz, B.		26
22	(Argentina) Franco Vivian		24
23	(Argentina) Vazquez, J.		24
24	(Argentina) Cicarelli, I.		23
25	(Argentina) Agustín Miotti		23
26	(Argentina) Emanuel Bailheres		22
27	(Argentina) Ignacio Vivian		19
28	(Argentina) Barovero, N.		17
29	(Argentina) Martin Serrano		16
30	(Argentina) Gonzalo Perlo		16
31	(Argentina) Klappenbach, A.		15
32	(Argentina) Bigliati, J.		13
33	(Argentina) Rodríguez, M.		12
34	(Argentina) Ventana, S.		12
35	(Argentina) Díaz, N.		12
36	(Argentina) Gerardo Risso		11
37	(Argentina) Nicolas Outeiriño		11
38	(Argentina) Juan Jose Conde		11
39	(Argentina) Rodrigo Rogani		10
40	(Argentina) Piccioni, J. M.		10
41	(Argentina) Cassalis, L.		10
42	(Argentina) Malizia, P.		9
43	(Uruguay) Mauricio Lambiris		8
44	(Argentina) Facundo Ardusso		8
45	(Argentina) Tedeschi, A.		7
46	(Argentina) Chagas, O.		7
47	(Argentina) Daniel Britez		7
48	(Ecuador) Juan Fernando Cevallo		6
49	(Argentina) Gigena, A.		6
50	(Argentina) González Arai		5
51	(Argentina) Dino Fernández		4
52	(Argentina) Flaumer, W.		4
53	(Argentina) Sgroppo, S.		3
54	(Argentina) Patricio Signorile		3
55	(Chile) Kevin Toledo		3
56	(Argentina) Federico Moises		3
57	(Argentina) Damián Cassino		2
58	(Argentina) Gonzalo Prosorovich		2
59	(Argentina) Moreira, I.		2
60	(Argentina) Christian Martínez		2
61	(Argentina) Martin Marchesin		2
62	(Argentina) Pernigotte, S.		2
63	(Argentina) Di Palma, J. L.		1
64	(Argentina) Alejandro Gonzalez		1
65	(Chile) Jose Luis Riffo		1
66	(Argentina) Martín Barrios		1
67	(Argentina) Gilles Pagani		1
68	(Argentina) Fernando Janson		1
69	(Argentina) César Ramos		1
70	(Argentina) Leonardo Cordeiro		1
71	(Argentina) Luis Romano		1

Pos	Team	Points
1		

=== 2006 PanamGPSeries Formula 1600 Junior season ===
The PanamGPSeries Formula 1600 Junior is held with the Formula Renault 2000 de America on the same races. The same point system is used.

- Point system : 30, 24, 20, 16, 12, 10, 8, 6, 4, 2 for 10th. Extra 2 points for Fastest lap and 2 points for Pole position.

Pos	Driver	Team	Points
1	(Colombia) Juan E. Jacobo	Roshfrans Colombia	236
2	(Mexico) Alejandro Sobrado	Gas Satellite	180
3	(Mexico) Rodrigo Peralta	Panam GP Series	150
4	(Colombia) Juan M. Gonzalez	Zeuss Petroleum	150
5	(Mexico) Adrián González	González Racing	144
6	(Mexico) Estefania Reyes	Hospital Obregon	102
7	(Colombia) Manuel Acosta	Colombia	78
8	(Mexico) Enrique Vazquez	Bic No sabe fallar	66
9	(Colombia) Gabriel Chaves	Cheves Racing	38
10	(Colombia) Daniel Gaitan	Gaitan Racing	36
11	(Mexico) Enrique Baca A.	Unico	30
12	(Colombia) Andres Pulido	Inter. Racing	28
13	(Mexico) Alejandro Servin	Exess-Martell	24
14	(Venezuela) Jorge Moncálvez	Venezuela	20
15	(Mexico) Gerardo Nieto	Gas Express Nieto	20
16	(Venezuela) Gustavo Linares	Inst. del Deport Ven.	12
17	(Guatemala) Roberto Dalton	Honda Racing	8
18	(Colombia) Julián Martínez	Martinez Racing	6
19	(Colombia) Guatavo Perdomo	Consoladas	2

=== 2006 Formula TR 1600 Pro Series season ===
The Formula TR 1600 Pro Series is held with the Formula TR 2000 Pro Series. The same point system is used.

Pos	Driver	Team	Points
1	(United States) Parker Kligerman		782
2	(United States) Bill Goshen	Goshen Racing	764
3	(United States) Luis Martinez Jr.	Position One Motorsports	707
4	(United States) Liam Kenney	Paladin Motorsports	686
5	(United States) Tayler Malsam	Odyssey Motorsports	496
6	(United States) Kerry Lynch	Knudsen Racing	426
7	(United States) Alexander Rossi	Odyssey Motorsports	409
8	(United States) Kerstin Smutny		377
9	(United States) Cameron Grisdale		352
10	(United States) Tony Welch	Welch Racing	98
11	(United States) George Latus	Team Latus Motors Harley-Davidson	64

Pos	Team	Points
1		

== Other Formulas powered by Renault championships ==
This section resume unofficial and/or renault engine supplier formulas series.

=== 2006 GP2 Series seasons ===
The GP2 Series are powered by 4 liters, V8 Renault engine and Bridgestone tyres with a Dallara chassis.

=== 2006 Formula Super Renault season ===
The series use Dallara, Reynard, Ralt or Toms chassis and Renault 21, 18 or F3R 2.0L engine. The championship was held on 12 venues:

1. (March 15) Autódromo Roberto Mouras
2. (April 20) Autódromo Roberto Mouras
3. (April ?) Autódromo 9 de Julio
4. (May 1) Autódromo Roberto Mouras
5. (June 22) Autódromo Sudamericano de Olavarría
6. (July 12) Autódromo Roberto Mouras
7. (July ?) Autódromo 9 de Julio
8. (August 7) Autódromo Roberto Mouras
9. (September 4) Autódromo Sudamericano de Olavarría
10. (October 18) Autódromo Roberto Mouras
11. (November ?) Autódromo Roberto Mouras
12. (November ?) Autódromo Roberto Mouras

Pos	Driver	Team / Chassis	Points
1	(Argentina) Eric Borsani	Borsani Competición / Ralt	
2	(Argentina) Fernando Estrella	? / Dallara	
3	(Argentina) Christian Martuccio		
4	(Argentina) Gabriel Al	Al Competicion / Ralt	
5	(Argentina) Pedro Gentile		
6	(Argentina) Gerardo Ferrero		
7	(Argentina) Gaston Crusita		
8	(Argentina) Omar El Bacha		
9	(Argentina) Sergio Solmi		
10	(Argentina) Gaston Ferrante		
11	(Argentina) Claudio Koler		
12	(Argentina) Carlos Arias		
13	(Argentina) Cristian Taborda		
14	(Argentina) Ricardo Ballari	Ballari Pro Gring / Tom	
15	(Argentina) Andres Parra		

=== 2006 Fórmula Renault Interprovencial season ===
Colour	Result
Gold	Winner
Silver	2nd place
Bronze	3rd place
Green	Finished, in points
Green	Retired, in points
Blue	Finished, no points
Purple	Did not finish (Ret)
Purple	Not classified (NC)
Red	Did not qualify (DNQ)
Black	Disqualified (DSQ)
White	Did not start (DNS)
White	Withdrew (WD)
Blank	Did not participate
Blank	Injured (INJ)
Blank	Excluded (EX)
**Bold**	Pole position
*	Fastest lap
spr	Sprint Race
fea	Feature Race
