= 2012 Panam GP Series =

Seasons
- ← 2008 2013 →

The 2012 Panam GP Series season is the revival of Panam GP Series. This series takes their format of the defunct A1 Grand Prix with Latin American national teams. Panam GP Series has the approval of FIA and Ferrari Driver Academy. The car will be the same used in the Formula Abarth.

== Cars ==
The car is a Tatuus with a 1.4 L Turbo FIAT engine.

== Teams ==
Latin American teams have been invited to participate. Mexico, Venezuela, Chile have confirmed theirs participation.

| Team | No. | Drivers | Class | Round |
|---|---|---|---|---|
| (Mexico) Megaracing | 0 | (Mexico) Enrique Baca | | 1 |
| (Mexico) Megaracing | 2 | (Mexico) Homero Richards | | 1 |
| (Mexico) Megaracing | 4 | (Mexico) Juan Carlos González | | 1–2 |
| (Mexico) Megaracing | 5 | (Mexico) Giancarlo Vecchi | Y | 1–2 |
| (Mexico) Megaracing | 11 | (Mexico) Hugo Oliveras | | 1 |
| (Mexico) Megaracing | TBA | (Mexico) Oscar Hidalgo | | 2 |
| Team Costa Rica | 10 | (Mexico) Luis Carlos Martínez | | 1 |
| Team Costa Rica | 11 | (Mexico) Enrique Baca | | 2–3 |
| Team Costa Rica | 15 | (Costa Rica) Verónica Valverde | Y | 1–3 |
| Team Costa Rica | 20 | (Chile) Jorge Bas Viguera | | 1–3 |
| Team Costa Rica | 83 | (Ecuador) Sebastián Merchán | | 1–3 |
| Venezuela | 19 | (Venezuela) Javier Amado | Y | 1–3 |
| Venezuela | 21 | (Venezuela) Francisco Cerullo | | 1–3 |
| (Mexico) SPM Motorsports | 7 | (Mexico) Gerardo Nieto | | 1–3 |
| (Mexico) SPM Motorsports | 8 | (Mexico) Alfonso Toledano Jr. | | 1 |
| (Mexico) SPM Motorsports | 8 | (Mexico) Luis Carlos Martínez | | 2–3 |
| | 99 | (Colombia) Martín Sala | | 1 |
| | 18 | (Guatemala) Andrés Saravia | | 2–3 |
| (Mexico) Team CSM | 9 | (Mexico) Oscar Arroyo | | 2–3 |
| (Mexico) Team CSM | 10 | (Mexico) Martín Fuentes | | 2–3 |
| (Mexico) Team CSM | 30 | (Mexico) Santiago Creel | | 2–3 |
| (Mexico) Team CSM | 60 | (Mexico) Rodolfo Camarillo | | 1–2 |

| Icon | Class |
|---|---|
| Y | Youth Class |

== Race calendar and results ==
The schedule consists of seven races in North, Central and South America.

| Round | | Date | Country | Circuit | Pole position | Fastest lap | Winner | Team |
|---|---|---|---|---|---|---|---|---|
| 1 | R1 | June 3 | Mexico | Autódromo Hermanos Rodríguez | (Mexico) Hugo Oliveras | (Venezuela) Francisco Cerullo | (Mexico) Hugo Oliveras | (Mexico) Megaracing |
| 1 | R2 | June 3 | Mexico | Autódromo Hermanos Rodríguez | | (Mexico) Gerardo Nieto | (Mexico) Gerardo Nieto | (Mexico) SPM Motorsports |
| 2 | R3 | July 1 | Guatemala | Autódromo Pedro Cofiño | (Guatemala) Andrés Saravia | (Ecuador) Sebastián Merchán | (Guatemala) Andrés Saravia | |
| 2 | R4 | July 1 | Guatemala | Autódromo Pedro Cofiño | | (Mexico) Enrique Baca | (Mexico) Gerardo Nieto | (Mexico) SPM Motorsports |
| 3 | R5 | July 15 | Costa Rica | Autódromo La Guácima | (Mexico) Gerardo Nieto | (Ecuador) Sebastián Merchán | (Mexico) Gerardo Nieto | (Mexico) SPM Motorsports |
| 3 | R6 | July 15 | Costa Rica | Autódromo La Guácima | | (Ecuador) Sebastián Merchán | (Ecuador) Sebastián Merchán | Team Costa Rica |
| 4 | R7 | August 26 | Venezuela | Autódromo San Carlos | (Mexico) Gerardo Nieto | (Venezuela) Francisco Cerullo | (Venezuela) Francisco Cerullo | Venezuela |
| 5 | R8 | September 22 | Colombia | Autódromo de Tocancipá | (Ecuador) Sebastián Merchán | (Ecuador) Sebastián Merchán | (Ecuador) Sebastián Merchán | Team Costa Rica |
| 5 | R9 | September 22 | Colombia | Autódromo de Tocancipá | | (Colombia) Juan Camilo Acosta | (Colombia) Juan Camilo Acosta | |
| 6 | R10 | October 28 | Ecuador | Autodromo Internacional José Tobar | (Ecuador) Sebastián Merchán | (Ecuador) Sebastián Merchán | (Ecuador) Sebastián Merchán | Team Costa Rica |
| 6 | R11 | October 28 | Ecuador | Autodromo Internacional José Tobar | | (Ecuador) Sebastián Merchán | (Ecuador) Sebastián Merchán | Team Costa Rica |
| 7 | R12 | 9 December | Chile | Autódromo Huachalalume | (Chile) Jorge Bas Viguera | (Venezuela) Francisco Cerullo | (Ecuador) Sebastián Merchán | Team Costa Rica |
| 7 | R13 | 9 December | Chile | Autódromo Huachalalume | | (Venezuela) Francisco Cerullo | (Chile) Jorge Bas Viguera | Team Costa Rica |

== Report ==
Previous to first race, a test was conducted in the Autódromo Hermanos Rodríguez. Gerado Nieto was the fastest driver clocked 1:19.145 in the 4 km course (181.94 km/h). Rodolfo Camarillo had the second fastest time in 1:19.183, and the NASCAR driver, Hugo Oliveras, clocked 1:19.341.

=== Round 1: Mexico ===
The season began in Mexico. Hugo Oliveras set the fastest time in the qualifying session. The Ecuadorian driver, Sebastián Merchán, was the second fastest. In the first race Merchán took the lead in the first lap, but Oliveras recovered the first place in the second lap for win the race (27:42.000, 173.8 km/h). Merchán came in second place. Homero Richards and Francisco Cerullo fight for the third place, being the winner Richards. The second race was started with reverse grid, Luis Carlos Martínez in the pole, but Gerardo Nieto became the leader in the first lap to win the race (26:24.751, 181.73 km/h). Francisco Cerullo never can reach to Nieto, and finished in second place. Javier Amado, Homero Richards and Hugo Oliveras fought for the third place, finally Oliveras won the position.

=== Round 2: Guatemala ===
The second round was carried out in Guatemala. The first race was won by the local driver Andrés Saravia. Saravia had taken the pole in the qualification, and dominated all of the race. The second race was won by Gerardo Nieto, who took his second victory, and the lead of the championship.

== Standings ==
=== Drivers' ===
| Rank | Driver | (Mexico) MEX | | (Guatemala) GUA | | (Costa Rica) CRC | | (Venezuela) VEN | (Colombia) COL | | (Ecuador) ECU | | (Chile) CHI | Pts |
|---|---|---|---|---|---|---|---|---|---|---|---|---|---|---|
| 1 | (Ecuador) Sebastián Merchán | 2 | 15 | 3 | 2 | 2 | 1 | 3 | 1 | 4 | 1 | 1 | | 167 |
| 2 | (Mexico) Gerardo Nieto | 5 | 1 | 6 | 1 | 1 | 11 | 2 | 2 | 5 | 2 | 7 | | 133 |
| 3 | (Venezuela) Francisco Cerullo | 4 | 2 | 2 | 6 | 3 | 3 | 1 | 9 | 2 | 5 | 2 | | 131 |
| 4 | (Mexico) Rodolfo Camarillo | 6 | 5 | 5 | 3 | | | 13 | 3 | 6 | 3 | 5 | | 70 |
| 5 | (Guatemala) Andrés Saravia | | | 1 | 5 | 4 | 2 | | | | | | | 54 |
| 6 | (Colombia) Juan Camilo Acosta | | | | | | | | 4 | 1 | 4 | 3 | | 53 |
| 7 | (Mexico) Luis Carlos Martinez | 8 | 7 | 9 | 9 | 7 | DSQ | 8 | 8 | 3 | 7 | 6 | | 42 |
| 8 | (Chile) Jorge Bas Viguera | 11 | 8 | 7 | 8 | 5 | 5 | 9 | 5 | 7 | 11 | 11 | | 40 |
| 9 | (Mexico) Hugo Oliveras | 1 | 3 | | | | | | | | | | | 33 |
| 10 | (Costa Rica) Verónica Valverde | 10 | 10 | 13 | 10 | 9 | 6 | 12 | 10 | 8 | 6 | 4 | | 29 |
| 11 | (Mexico) Homero Richards | 3 | 4 | | | | | | | | | | | 22 |
| 12 | (Mexico) Giancarlo Vecchi | 12 | 9 | 8 | 7 | 6 | 9 | 11 | 6 | 13 | 10 | 10 | | 22 |
| 13 | (Mexico) Enrique Baca Amador | 14 | 14 | 4 | 4 | | | | | | | | | 21 |
| 14 | (Venezuela) Javier Amado | 7 | 6 | 10 | 12 | 10 | 12 | 7 | 7 | 14 | | | | 19 |
| 15 | (Costa Rica) Carlos Fonseca | | | | | 8 | 4 | | | | | | | 13 |
| 16 | (Venezuela) Fernando Baiz | | | | | | | 4 | 11 | 9 | | | | 12 |
| 17 | (Mexico) Santiago Creel | | | 11 | 13 | 12 | 8 | 6 | 13 | 10 | 13 | 9 | | 11 |
| 18 | (Mexico) Martín Fuentes | | | 15 | 11 | Inj | Inj | 5 | 14 | 11 | 8 | 8 | | 8 |
| 19 | (Mexico) Oscar Arroyo | | | 12 | 15 | 13 | 7 | 10 | DNS | DNS | 14 | 14 | | 5 |
| 20 | (Colombia) Martin Sala | 9 | 12 | | | | | | | | | | | 2 |
| 21 | (Chile) Vicente Bas | | | | | | | | | | 9 | 12 | | 2 |
| 22 | (Mexico) Juan Carlos González | 13 | 11 | 14 | 14 | 11 | 10 | | 12 | 12 | 12 | 13 | | 1 |
| 23 | (Costa Rica) André Solano | | | | | 14 | 13 | | | | | | | 0 |
| 24 | (Mexico) Alfonso Toledano, Jr. | 15 | 13 | | | | | | | | | | | 0 |
| 25 | (Ecuador) Fernando Madera, Jr. | | | | | | | | | | 15 | 15 | | 0 |
| Rank | Driver | (Mexico) MEX | | (Guatemala) GUA | | (Costa Rica) CRC | | (Venezuela) VEN | (Colombia) COL | | (Ecuador) ECU | | (Chile) CHI | Pts |

=== Nations' Cup ===
| Rank | Driver | (Mexico) MEX | | (Guatemala) GUA | | (Costa Rica) CRC | | (Venezuela) VEN | (Colombia) COL | (Ecuador) ECU | (Chile) CHI | Pts |
|---|---|---|---|---|---|---|---|---|---|---|---|---|
| 1 | Mexico | 1 | 1 | 4 | 1 | 1 | 7 | | | | | 94 |
| 2 | Ecuador | 2 | 15 | 3 | 2 | 2 | 1 | | | | | 92 |
| 3 | Venezuela | 4 | 2 | 2 | 6 | 3 | 3 | | | | | 72 |
| 4 | Guatemala | | | 1 | 5 | 4 | 2 | | | | | 38 |
| 5 | Chile | 11 | 8 | 7 | 8 | 5 | 5 | | | | | 26 |
| 6 | Costa Rica | 10 | 10 | 13 | 10 | 8 | 4 | | | | | 16 |
| 7 | Colombia | 9 | 12 | | | | | | | | | 2 |
| Rank | Driver | (Mexico) MEX | | (Guatemala) GUA | | (Costa Rica) CRC | | (Venezuela) VEN | (Colombia) COL | (Ecuador) ECU | (Chile) CHI | Pts |
