= 2013 Clio Cup China Series =

Multi-event, one make motor racing championship held across China

2013 Clio Cup China Series season

Seasons
- ← 2012 2014 →

The 2013 Clio Cup China Series is a multi-event, one make motor racing championship held across China. The championship features a mix of professional motor racing drivers and gentlemen drivers in the region, competing in a Clio Renault Sport 200 that conform to the technical regulations for the championship.

This season will be the 5th Clio Cup China Series season. The season started on 9 June at Shanghai Tianma Circuit and concluded on 13 October at Zhuhai International Circuit after 10 races to be held at 5 meetings. 4 race meetings were in support of the 2013 China Touring Car Championship and a round in Chengdu Goldenport Circuit was a supporting race for Sichuan Touring Car Elites.

== Teams and drivers ==
No.	Drivers	Rounds
1	(China) Liu Hailong	3
2	(China) Di Yuelong	3
2	(Hong Kong) Kenneth Lau	5
3	(Hong Kong) Eric Lo	3
4	(China) Shi Jie	All
8	(Hong Kong) Alan Lee	5
10	(Hong Kong) Byron Tong	1-2,4-5
11	(Hong Kong) Tommy Chan	All
13	(Hong Kong) Kenneth Ma	All
18	(China) Jiang Bo	2
22	(Hong Kong) Yu Kam Cheong	5
23	(Hong Kong) Huang Yi	All
33	(Hong Kong) Benson Wong	5
50	(China) Yang Xu	All
59	(South Africa) Naomi Schiff	3-4
59	(China) Hu Chengwei	5
66	(China) Ye Xingping	All
8	(Italy) Max Wiser^{1}	1

Notes:

- ^1 — Guest Driver, ineligible for points or prizes.

== Race calendar and results ==
Championship is counted towards the best 8 rounds out of 10.

Round		Circuit	Date	Pole position	Fastest lap	Winning driver
1	R1	Shanghai Tianma Circuit	9 June	(Italy) Max Wiser	(Hong Kong) Tommy Chan (Note: Fastest lap recorded by Max Wiser, but he was ineligible to score the fastest lap point.)	(Italy) Max Wiser
1	R2	Shanghai Tianma Circuit	9 June	(Italy) Max Wiser	(Hong Kong) Tommy Chan	(Italy) Max Wiser
2	R3	Chengdu Goldenport Circuit	14 July	(Hong Kong) Kenneth Ma	(Hong Kong) Tommy Chan	(China) Yang Xu
2	R4	Chengdu Goldenport Circuit	14 July	(Hong Kong) Kenneth Ma	(Hong Kong) Tommy Chan	(Hong Kong) Tommy Chan
3	R5	Chengdu Goldenport Circuit	25 August	(Hong Kong) Tommy Chan	(South Africa) Naomi Schiff	(Hong Kong) Tommy Chan
3	R6	Chengdu Goldenport Circuit	25 August	(South Africa) Naomi Schiff	(South Africa) Naomi Schiff	(South Africa) Naomi Schiff
4	R7	Guangdong International Circuit	22 September	(South Africa) Naomi Schiff	(Hong Kong) Tommy Chan	(Hong Kong) Byron Tong
4	R8	Guangdong International Circuit	22 September	(South Africa) Naomi Schiff	(South Africa) Naomi Schiff	(South Africa) Naomi Schiff
5	R9	Zhuhai International Circuit	12 October	(Hong Kong) Byron Tong	(Hong Kong) Tommy Chan	(Hong Kong) Byron Tong
5	R10	Zhuhai International Circuit	13 October	(Hong Kong) Tommy Chan	(Hong Kong) Tommy Chan	(Hong Kong) Tommy Chan

== Championship Standings ==
Championship is count towards the 8 best results from 10 races.

Pos	Driver	STC (China)		CDIC (China)		CDIC (China)		GIC (China)		ZIC (China)		Pts
1	(Hong Kong) Tommy Chan	2^{2}	2	2	1	**1**	(5)^{3}	(6)	2	2	**1**	256(296)
2	(Hong Kong) Byron Tong	3	5	3	3			1	3	**1**	3	214
3	(Hong Kong) Kenneth Ma	4	2	4	2	3	(7)	2	4	4	(4)	200(238)
4	(China) Huang Yi	5	6	6	6	5	2	5	6	(8)	(9)	162(188)
5	(China) Ye Xingping	Ret	5	5	5	Ret	3	4	5	9	5	159
6	(China) Yang Xu	Ret	4	1	4	Ret	8	3	Ret	5	6	156
7	(South Africa) Naomi Schiff					2	**1**	Ret	**1**			98
8	(Hong Kong) Yu Kam Cheong									7	2	44
9	(Hong Kong) Eric Lo					4	4					44
10	(China) Shi Jie	6	8									36
11	(China) Liu Hailong					7	6					34
12	(China) Di Yuelong					14	13					30
13	(Hong Kong) Alan Lee									6	10	29
14	(China) Hu Chengwei									10	7	27
15	(Hong Kong) Kenneth Lau									3	DNS	25
16	(Hong Kong) Benson Wong									11	7	24
17	(China) Jiang Bo				7							18
Guest drivers ineligible for points
	(Italy) Max Wiser	1	1									0
Pos	Driver	STC (China)		CDIC (China)		CDIC (China)		GIC (China)		ZIC (China)		Pts

Colour	Result
Gold	Winner
Silver	Second place
Bronze	Third place
Green	Points classification
Blue	Non-points classification
Blue	Non-classified finish (NC)
Purple	Retired, not classified (Ret)
Red	Did not qualify (DNQ)
Red	Did not pre-qualify (DNPQ)
Black	Disqualified (DSQ)
White	Did not start (DNS)
White	Withdrew (WD)
White	Race cancelled (C)
Blank	Did not practice (DNP)
Blank	Did not arrive (DNA)
Blank	Excluded (EX)

**Bold** - Pole position
Italics - Fastest lap

Notes: ^2 — Max Wiser was the winner of R1 and R2, but he was ineligible for points or prizes. ^3Points in brackets are dropped as Championship only counts towards the 8 best results out of 10 rounds.
