= Formula Racing Development =

Motorsport promoter headquartered in Hong Kong, China

Formula Racing Development Ltd.
- Native name: 方程式賽車發展有限公司
- Type: Privately held company
- Industry: Motorsports
- Founded: 1997 (Hong Kong)
- Founder: Kenneth Ma
- Headquarters: Hong Kong, Zhuhai, Shanghai, China
- Area served: Asia
- Key people: Kenneth Ma (Founder and CEO)
- Products: Race Organization, Motorsport Engineering

Formula Racing Development Limited or FRD Motorsports (FRD) is a motorsport promoter headquartered in Hong Kong, China which was founded in 1997.

It has been the organiser and promoter of several Asian and China based championships, such as Asian Formula Renault Championship, China Formula Campus Championship, Clio Cup China Series, and Asia GT Race Series. It also conducts racing schools, driving schools, corporate programs, car events and even an annual celebrity race. FRD also has an in-house racing team which takes part in several racing series, most notably in CTCC under the banner of "Chang'an Ford Racing Team".

== About FRD ==
It is one of the largest racing schools in Asia and was started in 1997 by owner Kenneth Ma with an ambition to provide opportunities and facilities for drivers in the region to gain professional recognition in motorsport. Over the years, through its in-house driving schools and race-organized, FRD has sponsored notable Chinese race drivers: Marchy Lee, Jim Ka To, Jiang Tengyi, Frankie Chang, as well as Finnish driver and German Formula Renault champion Pekka Saarinen.

FRD organises and promotes professional level competitive racing in Asia. Featuring a junior Formula series called Ford Formula Campus, FRD joins forces with Changan FORD automaker, allowing young gun drivers to test their mettle against each other. After which FRD, partnering with leading French automaker Renault and their Sports Technologies Division, became the official Asian promoter of the Formula Renault 2.0 series in 2002. In the 2009 season, following the success of FRD and Renault Formula racing, the European Renault Clio Cup series was also successfully introduced with outstanding success.

In addition FRD organises GT (Gran Turismo) class racing, featuring powerful touring supercars, with names such as Ferrari and Aston Martin. Jointly organised by FRD and Zhuhai International Circuit (ZIC), this Series is considered one of Asia's most prominent Supercar races. Attracting drivers from around the world, they compete on several tracks in China and greater Asia.

To share in their success and give back to the people and fans by organising events such as their Celebrity Charity Race. Working with personalities like Jackie Chan, Jet Li and Aaron Kwok to show support and attention to disaster areas and humanitarian causes. Having previously raised approximately 400,000,000 RMB on a single event.

In 2006, teaming up with Changan Ford, FRD established the "Changan Ford Racing Team". Composed of members from Changan Ford, they are the first factory team to compete in the China Touring Car Championship (CTCC) race, the top touring car race in China. Competing in specially modified Ford FOCUS cars, they establish a winning record with six manufacturer's championship titles, becoming a leading competitor and a team to be respected.

FRD's fleet totals around 100 race cars divided among Shanghai International Circuit and Zhuhai International Circuit. Those include Formula Renault, Formula Campus, Clio Cup, Ferrari 360, and Ford Focus Cup cars.

FRD's activities are separated into four major departments:

- Race organizer and promoter
- Team management
- Driver training and development
- Corporation support activity

== Races organized by FRD ==
=== Asian Formula Renault Series (2000–present) ===
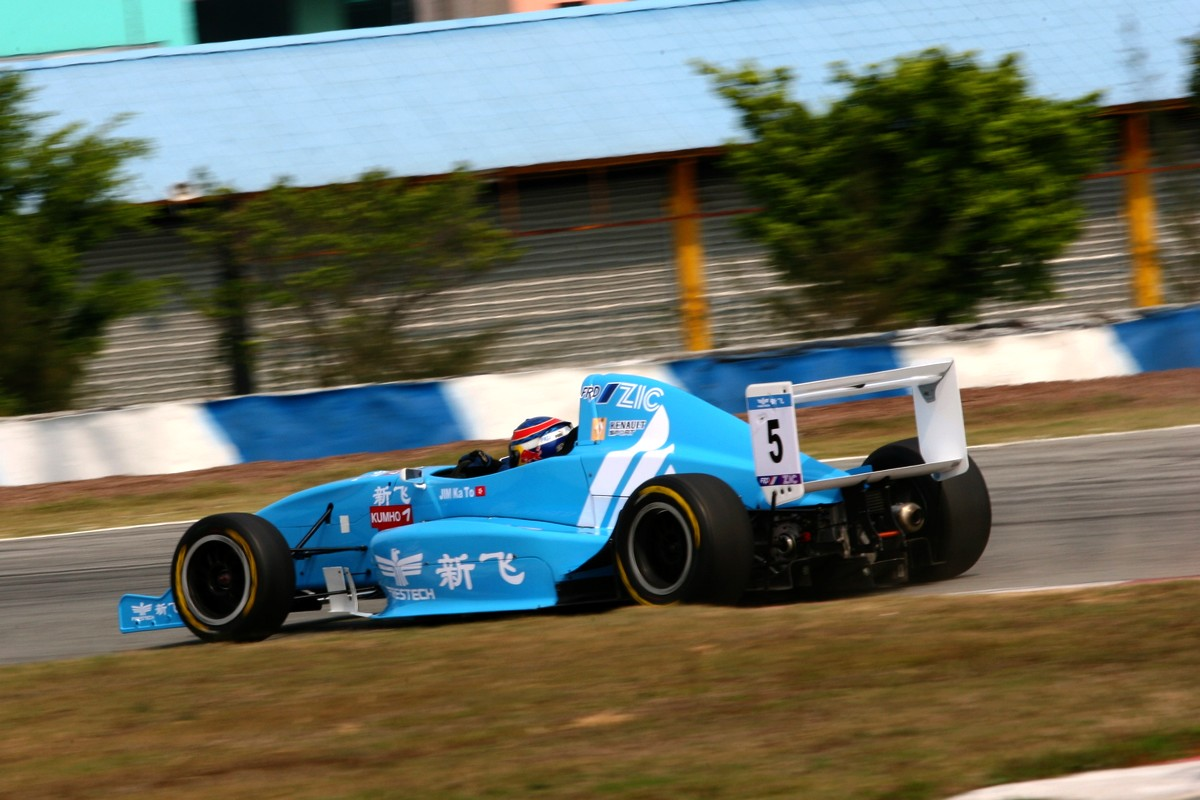
Jim Ka To, driving for FRD, on his way to winning the 2008 Asian Formula Renault Challenge title.

With the aim of providing a budget junior racing series around the Asian region, FRD, with the support from Renault Sport, imported a fleet of Formula Renault 2.0 race cars and first organised the Asian Formula Renault Series (aka AFR Series) in 2000. This is a pioneering junior racing series in Asia and it attracted numerous young talents from the region to join the grid over the years. From 2002 to 2005, the series even held an invitation race during the Macau Grand Prix weekend and big names such as Japanese F1 stars Kamui Kobayashi, Kazuki Nakajima, Red Bull Junior Team's Scott Speed, Brazilian Bruno Senna all once took part in the event. In the coming 2014 season, the Series will be using the latest version of Formula Renault cars.

=== Clio Cup China Series (2009–present) ===
Clio Cup China Series is a one-make series held in China that featured Renault Clio since 2009. Originally begun by Renault Sport in Europe, managed and organised by Formula Racing Development (FRD) in China, the Clio Cup China Series is a one-make racing series featuring the Clio supermini car.

Over the years, many experienced drivers from the region joined the race and even Hong Kong superstar Aaron Kwok once joined the series and won the championship in 2009.

2013, there will be ten rounds of Clio Cup China Series around China: there will be four races as one of the supporting race of 2013 CTCC.

=== Formula Campus (1997–2009) ===
With the concept of having a professional, competitive entry level racing for young drivers, Formula Racing Development (FRD) introduces FORD's Formula Campus Championship to the Asian region. Started in 1997, it provided a modern and professional platform for aspiring young racers in Asia to challenge and test themselves.

In 2007, the Formula Campus cars were upgraded with more advanced engineering, design and training technology. Body chassis’ were improved for aerodynamics and the MoTec Data Analysis system was introduced to allow trainers and the drivers themselves, to get a better understanding of training progression and driving skill. In co-operation with Changan Ford and their joint commitment with FRD to help promote motorsports in Asia, Ford engines and gearboxes were also installed into the cars for a remarked leap forward in performance and racing time.

=== Celebrity Race (2004–present) ===
FRD has been hosting the Celebrity Charity Race since 2004. For the first 2 years, FRD joined Jackie Chan Charitable Foundation to hold the "Jackie Chan Cup" Charity Race, which mainly contested by Asian female celebrities. In 2006, FRD successfully organised the Hong Kong China Travel Service Cup, with stars like Alan Tam and Eric Tsang to participate in.

From 2007, FRD partners Jet Li’s One Foundation Project, and organised the One Foundation Charity Celebrity Race. Jet Li and guest celebrities come and call for the spectators to support charity. Over the years, more than 80 celebrities joined the Celebrity Race, and the race helped raised fund to charities in the past 11 years.

== Racing team ==
=== FRD Racing Team ===
FRD Racing Team is based in Zhuhai and runs a total of 12 Formula Renault 2.0-cars. It's split-up in a race-team, that travels around with Asian Formula Renault Series, and a test-team that stays in Zhuhai to provide all-year-round testing possibilities with their Formula Renault 2.0-cars.

The team now also help in servicing race cars in Cthe lio Cup China Series as well.

=== Changan Ford Racing Team ===
On 15 February 2006, Changan Ford Automobile Corporation Limited and Formula Racing Development Limited (FRD) formally announced the establishment of Changan Ford Racing Team. This co-operation was the first time a true works racing team took part in CTCC— the top touring car racing series in China.

To support CAF's commitment of developing young talented drivers in China, the team signed Rainey He in 2007 and further magnified his talent by providing him with the solid support of a team.

In the 2009 season, the team welcomed three competitive young drivers: Tengyi Jiang, Martin Cao and Andy Yan, with Rainey He as the lead driver. In the 2011 season, after Martin Cao departed from the team because of his university studies in the UK, the team welcomed the signing of Gaoxiang Fan, another young driver from the Changan Ford Young Driver Program. Thanks to the remarkable results of the four drivers, the team as the most competitive one, took home the manufacturer championship again in 2011; Andy Yan was crowned the overall driver champion and Tengyi Jiang the second runner-up for the 2011 season.

2012 is a turning point for Changan Ford Racing – after using the Focus model for over five years, the new Focus became the team's new racing car. All the hard work paid off, the Changan Ford Racing Team was crowned another manufacturer champion title again in 2012. This was the fourth title gained by the team in a row and the fifth in the last seven years. Andy Yan, Rainey He and Tengyi Jiang respectively won the first runner-up, second runner-up and third runner-up overall.

The team continual to compete with Ecoboost 1.6T engine at the wheel of New Focus sedan in 2013 season. Meanwhile, the team signed Martin Xie, the 2012 Driver Champion of China Production Car Class as the new driver, together with Andy Yan, Rainey He and Tengyi Jiang becoming the new line-up. The team was invincible for the season and took the sixth Manufacturer's Title in eight years; while Andy Yan reigned as Driver's Champion again.

Changan Ford Racing Team won the Manufacturer Title again and extending its winning streak to six of the 2014 China Touring Car Championship(CTCC).

Season	Drivers	Car Model
2006	(Hong Kong) Henry Lee Junior	Ford Focus(2nd Generation)
2006	(Hong Kong) Kenneth Ma	Ford Focus(2nd Generation)
2007	(Hong Kong) Henry Lee Junior	Ford Focus(2nd Generation)
2007	(China) Rainey He	Ford Focus(2nd Generation)
2007	(China) Zuo Xiaolong	Ford Focus(2nd Generation)
2008	(Hong Kong) Henry Lee Junior	Ford Focus(2nd Generation)
2008	(China) Rainey He	Ford Focus(2nd Generation)
2008	(China) Zuo Xiaolong	Ford Focus(2nd Generation)
2009	(China) Rainey He	Ford Focus(2nd Generation)
2009	(China) Tengyi Jiang	Ford Focus(2nd Generation)
2009	(Hong Kong) Andy Yan	Ford Focus(2nd Generation)
2009	(China) Martin Cao	Ford Focus(2nd Generation)
2010	(China) Rainey He	Ford Focus(2nd Generation)
2010	(China) Tengyi Jiang	Ford Focus(2nd Generation)
2010	(Hong Kong) Andy Yan	Ford Focus(2nd Generation)
2010	(China) Martin Cao	Ford Focus(2nd Generation)
2011	(China) Rainey He	Ford Focus(2nd Generation)
2011	(China) Tengyi Jiang	Ford Focus(2nd Generation)
2011	(Hong Kong) Andy Yan (Champion)	Ford Focus(2nd Generation)
2011	(China) Fan Gaoxiang	Ford Focus(2nd Generation)
2012	(China) Rainey He	Ford Focus(3rd Generation)
2012	(China) Tengyi Jiang	Ford Focus(3rd Generation)
2012	(Hong Kong) Andy Yan	Ford Focus(3rd Generation)
2012	(China) Fan Gaoxiang	Ford Focus(3rd Generation)
2013	(China) Rainey He	Ford Focus Sedan(3rd Generation)
2013	(China) Tengyi Jiang	Ford Focus Sedan(3rd Generation)
2013	(Hong Kong) Andy Yan (Champion)	Ford Focus Sedan(3rd Generation)
2013	(China) Martin Xie	Ford Focus Sedan(3rd Generation)
2014	(China) Rainey He	Ford Focus Sedan(3rd Generation)
2014	(Hong Kong) Darryl O'Young	Ford Focus Sedan(3rd Generation)
2014	(Hong Kong) Andy Yan	Ford Focus Sedan(3rd Generation)
2014	(China) Martin Xie	Ford Focus Sedan(3rd Generation)
2015	(China) Rainey He	Ford Focus Sedan(3rd Generation)
2015	(Hong Kong) Darryl O'Young	Ford Focus Sedan(3rd Generation)
2015	(Hong Kong) Andy Yan	Ford Focus Sedan(3rd Generation)
2015	(China) Huayang Gao	Ford Focus Sedan(3rd Generation)
2016	(China) Rainey He	Ford Focus Sedan(3rd Generation)
2016	(China) Martin Cao	Ford Focus Sedan(3rd Generation)
2016	(Hong Kong) Andy Yan	Ford Focus Sedan(3rd Generation)
2016	(China) Dasheng Zhang	Ford Focus Sedan(3rd Generation)
2016	(United Kingdom) Dan Wells	Ford Focus Sedan(3rd Generation)
