= Kenneth Ma (racing driver) =

Hong Kong racing driver

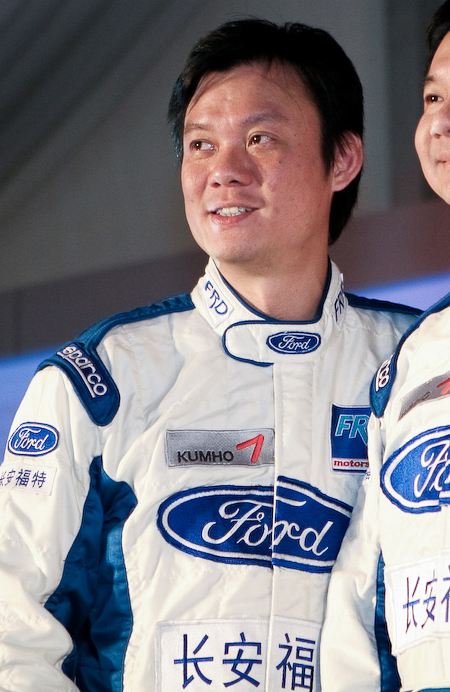
- Ma at the 2006 China Circuit Championship in Shanghai
- Nationality: Hong Kong
- Born: 24 March 1960 (age 66) Hong Kong

TCR Asia Series career
- Debut season: 2015
- Current team: FRD HK Racing
- Car number: 13

Previous series
- 2014 2014 2013 2012 2009-14 2008, 10, 12 2004, 06, 08, 12-13 2000: Renault Clio Eurocup; CTM Macau Cup; Renault Clio Cup Bohemia; Malaysian Super Series; Clio Cup China Series; Asian GT Championship; Asian Formula Renault Series; Formula 2000 Asia

"Kenneth" Ma Hon Wah (born 24 March 1960) is a Hong Kong racing driver currently competing in the TCR Asia Series. Having previously competed in the Clio Cup China Series and Asian Formula Renault Series among others.

== Racing career ==
Ma began his career in 2000 in the Formula 2000 Asia, finishing the season seventh in the standings. He was switched to the Asian Formula Renault Series in 2004, racing in the series for many years before switching to the Asian GT Championship in 2008. In 2009, he was switched to the Clio Cup China Series, finishing 2nd in the standings in 2014. In 2012, he raced in the Malaysia Super Series. He raced in the Renault Clio Cup Bohemia and Renault Clio Eurocup in 2013 and 2014, respectively. In 2014, he also raced in the CTM Macau Cup.

In September 2015, it was announced that Ma would race in the inaugural TCR Asia Series round in Sepang, driving a Ford Focus ST for FRD HK Racing. However, due to parts arriving late, he didn't start any of the races.

== Racing record ==
=== Complete TCR International Series results ===
(key) (Races in bold indicate pole position) (Races in italics indicate fastest lap)

Year	Team	Car	1	2	3	4	5	6	7	8	9	10	11	12	13	14	15	16	17	18	19	20	21	22	DC	Points
2015	FRD HK Racing	Ford Focus ST	SEP; 1	SEP; 2	SHA; 1	SHA; 2	VAL; 1	VAL; 2	ALG; 1	ALG; 2	MNZ; 1	MNZ; 2	SAL; 1	SAL; 2	SOC; 1	SOC; 2	RBR; 1	RBR; 2	MRN; 1 DNS	MRN; 2 Ret	CHA; 1	CHA; 2	MAC; 1	MAC; 2	NC	0
2016	FRD Motorsports	Ford Focus TCR	BHR; 1	BHR; 2	EST; 1	EST; 2	SPA; 1	SPA; 2	IMO; 1	IMO; 2	SAL; 1	SAL; 2	OSC; 1	OSC; 2	SOC; 1	SOC; 2	CHA; 1	CHA; 2	MRN; 1	MRN; 2	SEP; 1	SEP; 2	MAC; 1 DNQ	MAC; 2 DNQ	NC	0

^{†} Driver did not finish the race, but was classified as he completed over 90% of the race distance.
