= 6 Hours of Bogotá =

Automobile endurance race in Bogotá, Colombia

Campeonato Nacional de Automovilismo
- Venue: Autódromo de Tocancipá
- First race: 1986
- Duration: 6 Hours

The 6 Hours of Bogotá (Spanish: 6 Horas de Bogotá) is an automobile endurance race that is held annually in December at the Autódromo de Tocancipá, 20 km (12 mi) north of Bogotá, in the city's metropolitan area. It is the most prestigious endurance motorsport race in Colombia, it brings together national and international drivers and teams and has been held since 1986. It is held on the first Saturday of December each year. It is managed as an independent race, and the final race of the Campeonato Nacional de Automovilismo (CNA).

== History ==
The race had its first edition in mid-1986 as a result of the idea of having a long-term race in the country. Its first edition was called the "Premio Wagner Cofre Motor" and it was held over one hundred laps, in the Tocancipá Circuit of 2040 meters. This was disputed by small-cylinder touring cars along with cars with V8 engines. Its first winner was Pablo Gómez in a Simca. For the second edition in 1987, it was decided to change the one hundred laps for a duration of three hours. In 1988, it went to its current duration of six hours.

== Race winners ==
Year	Drivers				Car
1986	(Colombia) Pablo Gómez				Simca
1987	(Colombia) Honorato Espinosa		(Colombia) Lucio Bernal		Fiat
1988	(Colombia) Felipe Solano	(Colombia) Álvaro Mejía	(Colombia) John Estupiñán		Renault 4
1989	(Ecuador) Andrés Chiriboga		(Ecuador) Miguel Morejón		Porsche
1990	(Colombia) Ricardo Cano		(Colombia) Jorge Cortés		Mazda
1991	(Colombia) John Estupiñán	(Colombia) R. Wilson	(Colombia) P. Bickenbach		BMW
1992	(Colombia) Juan Carlos Rojas		(Colombia) Diego Guzmán		Camaro
1993	(Colombia) Juan Carlos Rojas	(Colombia) Oswaldo Fajardo	(Colombia) Diego Guzmán		Oldsmobile
1994	(Colombia) Jorge Cortés	(Colombia) Ricardo Cano	(Colombia) Luis Méndez		Spice
1995	(Colombia) Jorge Cortés	(Colombia) Juan Pablo Montoya	(Colombia) Diego Guzmán		Spice
1996	(Colombia) Jorge Cortés	(Colombia) Juan Pablo Montoya	(Colombia) Jorge Arango		Spice
1997	(Colombia) Jorge Cortés	(Colombia) Juan Pablo Montoya	(Colombia) Diego Guzmán		Spice
1998	(Colombia) Jorge Cortés		(Colombia) Diego Guzmán		Camaro
1999	(Colombia) Jorge Cortés	(Colombia) Jaime Guerrero	(Colombia) Diego Guzmán		Spice
2000	(Colombia) Felipe Solano		(Colombia) Jaime Guerrero		Camaro
2001	(Colombia) Felipe Solano		(Colombia) Jaime Guerrero		Mustang
2002	(Colombia) Felipe Solano	(Colombia) Jaime Guerrero	(Colombia) Roberto José Guerrero		Ford Mustang
2003	(Colombia) William Rudd	(Colombia) Jiro Cifuentes	(Colombia) Jaime Mantilla	(Colombia) Guillermo Olarte	Radical Suzuki
2004	(Italy) Ferdinando Monfardin	(Italy) Fulvio Ballabio	(Colombia) Camilo Zúrcher		Radical Suzuki
2005	(Ecuador) Henry Taleb		(Ecuador) Sebastián Merchán		Prototipo Ecuador
2006	(Colombia) Juan Espinosa		(Colombia) Mario Moncayo		JEC Toyota
2007	(Colombia) Sebastián Martínez		(Colombia) Julián Martínez		Radical
2008	(Colombia) Sebastián Martínez		(Colombia) Julián Martínez		Radical
2011	(Colombia) Gustavo Yacamán	(Colombia) Javier Castillo	(Colombia) Felipe Triana	(Colombia) Julián Albarracín	Prototipo Niko Salamandra
2012	(Venezuela) Alex Popow	(Venezuela) Gaetano Ardagna	(Scotland) Ryan Dalziel		Daytona Prototipo
2013	(Colombia) Julián Martínez	(Colombia) Sebastián Martínez	(Colombia) Santiago Lozano		Radical
2014	(Colombia) Juan Manuel González	(Colombia) Juan Alzate	(Colombia) Gabby Chaves		Prototipo Niko Salamandra
2015	(Ecuador) Javier Villagómez	(Ecuador) Miguel Villagómez	(Ecuador) Juan Rivera	(Costa Rica) José Moltalto	Radical SR3 1.5
2016	(Colombia) José Forero		(Colombia) Sebastián Villamil		Radical SR3
2017	(Ecuador) Javier Villagómez	(Ecuador) Miguel Villagómez	(Ecuador) Juan Rivera	(Ecuador) Julio Moreno	Radical SR3 1.500
2018	(Colombia) Óscar Tunjo	(Colombia) John Estupiñán	(Colombia) Jaime Guerrero	(Colombia) Jorge Cortés	West Turbo
2019	(Colombia) Óscar Tunjo	(Colombia) John Estupiñán	(Colombia) Jaime Guerrero	(Colombia) Juan Manuel González	SRT No. 45
2020	(Colombia) David Méndez	(Colombia) Andrés Méndez	(Colombia) Thomas Steuer		Radical SR3
2021	(Ecuador) Miguel Villagomez	(Ecuador) Mateo Villagomez	(Ecuador) Juan Rivera	(Ecuador) Xavier Villagomez	Radical SR3
2022	(Colombia) Óscar Tunjo	(Colombia) Jaime Guerrero	(Colombia) Juan Manuel González		West #45
2023	(Colombia) Óscar Tunjo	(Colombia) Juan Manuel González	(Colombia) Jaime Guerrero	(Colombia) Nicolás Baptiste	West Turbo 45
