= 2014 Clio Cup China Series =

2014 Clio Cup China Series season

Seasons
- ← 2013 2015 →

The 2014 Clio Cup China Series was a multi-event, one make motor racing championship held across China and South-East Asia. The championship featured a mix of professional motor racing drivers and gentlemen drivers in the region, competing in a Clio Renault Sport 200 that conformed to the technical regulations for the championship. The 2014 season was the sixth Clio Cup China Series season. The season started on 22 March at Zhuhai International Circuit and concluded on 28 September at Shanghai International Circuit after ten races held at five meetings. In addition, the series went for the first time to the Sepang International Circuit, Malaysia. To add more excitement to the races, the series invited several celebrity drivers to take part including Hong Kong TV and movie star Alex Fong (方中信) and model Jacquelin Ch'ng (莊思敏).

Naomi Schiff dominated the series, taking seven overall wins along with a further class win in the final round at Shanghai. Schiff won the championship by 135 points from Kenneth Ma, who did not finish better than third in any of the 10 races. Yang Xu finished a further 33 points behind in third place, having taken four successive second place finishes at the end of the season. The season's other winners were Eric Lo at the opening round in Zhuhai, and Byron Tong, who won at the second Zhuhai meeting. Lin Li Feng also won on a guest appearance at the Shanghai finale, but was ineligible to score drivers' championship points. With very few drivers competing in the whole season in Class B, Huang Yi was the winner of the championship.

== Teams and drivers ==
A = Class A B = Class B

No.	Drivers	Class	Rounds
2	(Hong Kong) Kenneth Lau	A	1
3	(Hong Kong) Eric Lo	A	1–2
5	(Hong Kong) Alan Lee	A	1, 3
6	(Hong Kong) Cary Yau	B	1–3
9	(China) Alex Fong	B	1–3
10	(Hong Kong) Byron Tong	A	3
11	(Hong Kong) Chin Ka-lok	A	1, 3, 5
12	(China) Yang Zi Yi	B	4
13	(Hong Kong) Kenneth Ma	A	All
16	(China) Song Bo	B	2–5
18	(South Africa) Naomi Schiff	A	All
20	(China) Chen Wei An	A	3
22	(Hong Kong) Yu Kam Cheong	A	1, 3, 5
22	(China) Zhu Jun Han	B	4
23	(China) Huang Yi	B	All
26	(Singapore) Gerard Yap	B	2
27	(Hong Kong) Paul Poon	A	2
29	(Hong Kong) Samson Fung	A	2
33	(Hong Kong) Benson Wong	B	1
36	(China) Han Zhen Lin	B	4
50	(China) Yang Xu	A	All
59	(China) Hu Cheng Wei	B	All
66	(China) Ye Xing Ping	B	All
68	(China) Lin Li Feng	A	5
77	(China) Zhou Bing	B	4
89	(Malaysia) Jacquelin Ch'ng	B	All
99	(Hong Kong) Tsang Ho Kwan	B	1

== Race calendar and results ==
Round		Circuit	Date	Pole position	Fastest lap	Winning driver
1	R1	(China) Zhuhai International Circuit	22 March	(South Africa) Naomi Schiff	(Hong Kong) Eric Lo	(Hong Kong) Eric Lo
1	R2	(China) Zhuhai International Circuit	23 March	(South Africa) Naomi Schiff	(South Africa) Naomi Schiff	(South Africa) Naomi Schiff
2	R3	(Malaysia) Sepang International Circuit	10 May	(South Africa) Naomi Schiff	(South Africa) Naomi Schiff	(South Africa) Naomi Schiff
2	R4	(Malaysia) Sepang International Circuit	11 May	(South Africa) Naomi Schiff	(South Africa) Naomi Schiff	(South Africa) Naomi Schiff
3	R5	(China) Zhuhai International Circuit	14 June	(Hong Kong) Chen Wei An	(Hong Kong) Byron Tong	(South Africa) Naomi Schiff
3	R6	(China) Zhuhai International Circuit	15 June	(South Africa) Naomi Schiff	(South Africa) Naomi Schiff	(Hong Kong) Byron Tong
4	R7	(China) Chengdu Goldenport Circuit	6 September	(South Africa) Naomi Schiff	(South Africa) Naomi Schiff	(South Africa) Naomi Schiff
4	R8	(China) Chengdu Goldenport Circuit	7 September	(South Africa) Naomi Schiff	(South Africa) Naomi Schiff	(South Africa) Naomi Schiff
5	R9	(China) Shanghai International Circuit	27 September	(China) Lin Li Feng	(South Africa) Naomi Schiff	(China) Lin Li Feng
5	R10	(China) Shanghai International Circuit	28 September	(South Africa) Naomi Schiff	(South Africa) Naomi Schiff	(South Africa) Naomi Schiff
