= Sebastián Merchán =

Ecuadorian racing driver (born 1987)

- Nationality: Ecuadorian
- Born: 2 December 1987 (age 38) Cuenca (Ecuador)

Sebastián Merchán (born 2 December 1987 in Cuenca) is an Ecuadorian racing driver. He has competed in such series as Euroseries 3000 and the Italian Formula Renault Championship. He won the Pro-Am class in the 2015 Lamborghini Blancpain Super Trofeo at Nürburgring.

Sporting positions
| Preceded by Javier Razo | Panam GP Series; Champion; 2012 | Succeeded by Rudy Camarillo |
