= Autódromo de Tocancipá =

Motor racing circuit in Tocancipá, Cundinamarca, Colombia

- Circuito 2 (1990–present)
- Location: Tocancipá, Cundinamarca, Colombia
- Coordinates: 4°57′38″N 73°56′48″W
- Opened: 7 February 1982; 43 years ago
- Major events: Current: 6 Hours of Bogotá (1986–present); Former: Panam GP Series (2006–2007, 2012)

Circuito 1 (1990–present)
- Surface: Asphalt
- Length: 2.040 km (1.268 mi)
- Turns: 12

Circuito 2 (1990–present)
- Surface: Asphalt
- Length: 2.725 km (1.693 mi)
- Turns: 14

Circuito 3 (1990–present)
- Surface: Asphalt
- Length: 1.655 km (1.028 mi)
- Turns: 10

Circuito 4 (1990–present)
- Surface: Asphalt
- Length: 2.340 km (1.454 mi)
- Turns: 14

Circuito 5 (1990–present)
- Surface: Asphalt
- Length: 1.010 km (0.628 mi)
- Turns: 4

Circuito Ovalo (1990–present)
- Surface: Asphalt
- Length: 0.954 km (0.593 mi)
- Turns: 4

Autódromo de Tocancipá is a motor racing circuit located in Tocancipá, Cundinamarca, Colombia. It is the official headquarters of the 6 Hours of Bogotá, Campeonato Nacional de Automovilismo (CNA), and TC2000 Colombia.

== History ==
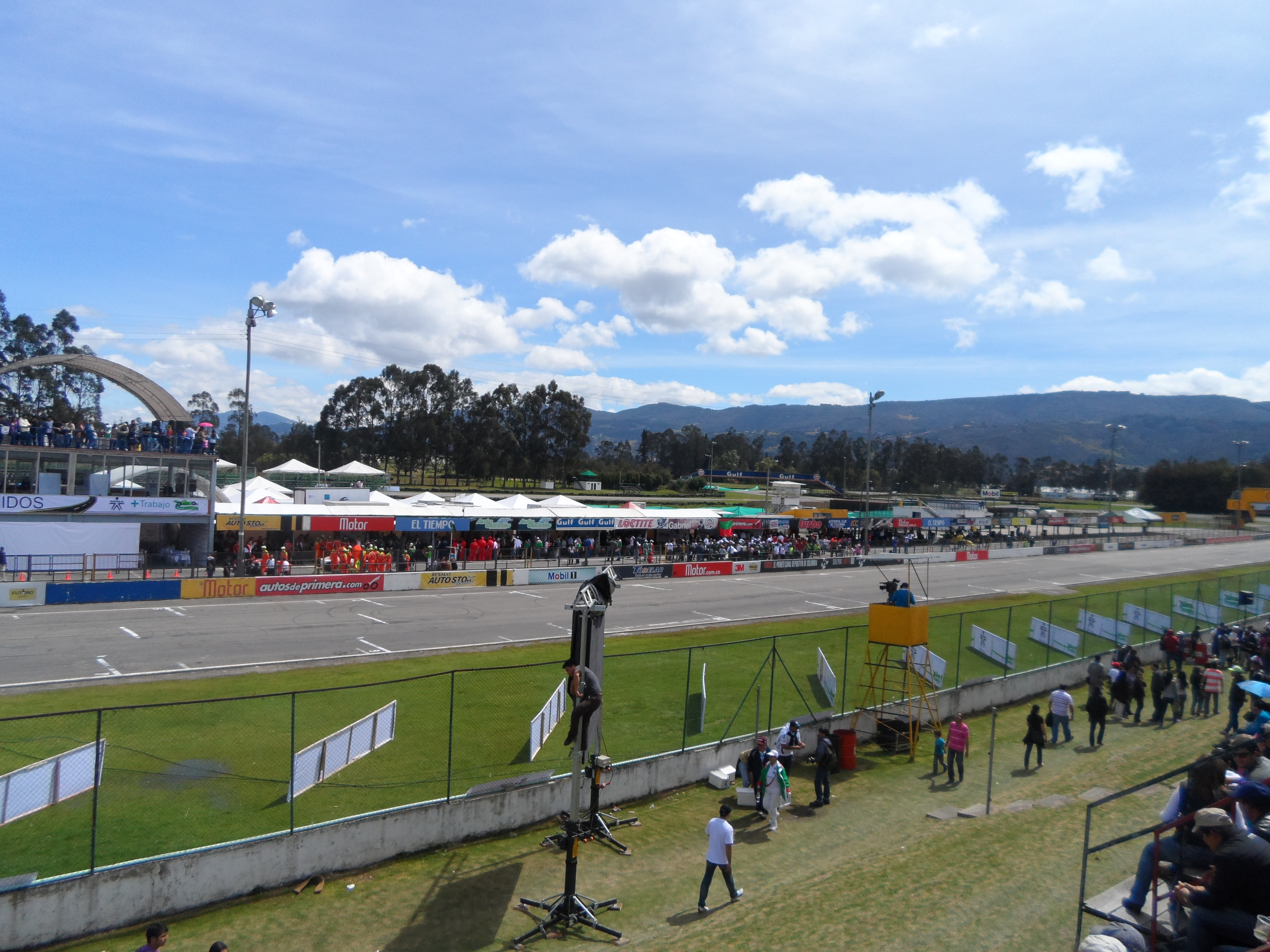
Panorama of the main straight of the circuit.

Based on an idea launched in 1980, Autódromo de Tocancipá was inaugurated on 7 February 1982, two years after Autódromo Ricardo Mejía was demolished.

The record for the fastest average speed over a race lap was achieved by the Colombian Óscar Tunjo with a time of 1:01:262 and 160.135 km/h (99.503 mph) on average during the qualifying sessions of the 2014 edition. It was previously held for nineteen years by his compatriot, Juan Pablo Montoya, with a time of 1:02:077 and 158.03 km/h (98.20 mph) on average, achieved during the 1995 edition.

On the nearby Kartódromo Juan Pablo Montoya, an annual kart race takes place, bringing together many international drivers each year.

== Layout ==
Autódromo de Tocancipá is normally raced in a clockwise direction; however, 6 Hours of Bogotá is raced in a counterclockwise direction.
