= Clio Cup China Series =

Chinese motorsports event

- Category: Renault Clio Cup
- Country: Asia
- Inaugural season: 2009
- Constructors: Renault
- Drivers' champion: (Indonesia) Senna Iriawan (Class A); (China) Hu Cheng Wei (Class B)
- Official website: frdsports.com

Clio Cup China Series is a one-make series held in China that featured Renault Clio since 2009. Originally begun by Renault Sport in Europe, managed and organized by Formula Racing Development (FRD) in China, the Clio Cup China Series is a one-make racing series featuring the Clio supermini car.

Over the years, many experienced drivers from the region joined the race and even Hong Kong superstar Aaron Kwok once joined the series and won the Championship in 2009.

2013, there will be 10 rounds of Clio Cup China Series around China: there will be 4 races as one of the supporting race of 2013 CTCC.

== Race Format ==
Over the race weekend, there is 1 30-minute official practice session and 2 Qualifying sessions of 30 minutes each. 2 races with no less than 40 kilometers will be held with equal points for both races. The race grid would be determined by its respective qualifying session. Which means Qualifying 1 will determine Race 1's grid and Qualifying 2 will determine Race 2's grid.

=== Current points system ===
Points are awarded to the top 20 drivers in each race as well as the driver(s) setting the fastest lap using the following system:

Current points system
1st	2nd	3rd	4th	5th	6th	7th	8th	9th	10th	11th	12th	13th	14th	15th	16th	17th	18th	19th	20th	Fastest lap
32	28	25	22	20	18	16	14	12	11	10	9	8	7	6	5	4	3	2	1	2

== Champions ==
Season	Champion	Renault model
2009	(Hong Kong) Aaron Kwok	Clio Renaultsport 200
2010	(Hong Kong) David Louie	Clio Renaultsport 200
2011	(United Kingdom) Steve Elmes	Clio Renaultsport 200
2012	(Hong Kong) Eric Lo	Clio Renaultsport 200
2013	(Hong Kong) Tommy Chan	Clio Renaultsport 200
2014	(South Africa) Naomi Schiff	Clio Renaultsport 200

Season	Class A	Class B	Renault model
2015	(Indonesia) Senna Iriawan	(China) Hu Cheng Wei	Clio Renaultsport 200
