= Saleen S5S Raptor =

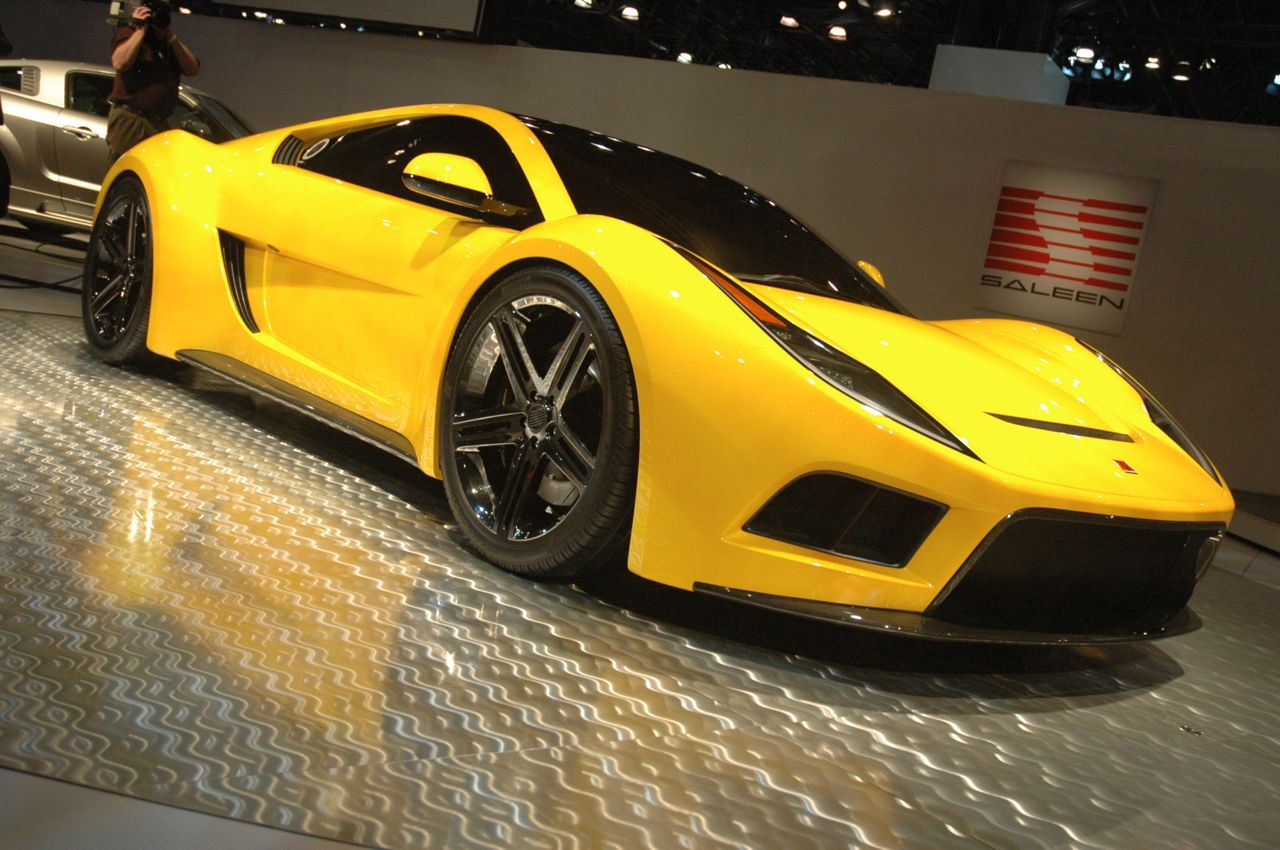

Overview
- Manufacturer: Saleen
- Designer: ASC Creative Services, Warren, Michigan

Body and chassis
- Class: Sports car (S)
- Layout: MR layout

Powertrain
- Engine: 5.0 L Saleen supercharged V8
- Transmission: 6-speed manual

Dimensions
- Wheelbase: 106.3 in (2,700 mm)
- Length: 175 in (4,445 mm)
- Width: 78.6 in (1,996 mm)
- Height: 46 in (1,168 mm)

The Saleen S5S Raptor is an American prototype concept car developed and built by American high performance automotive company Saleen. It was first publicly unveiled on March 20, 2008 at the 2008 New York International Auto Show.

The S5S Raptor was designed in 2007 at the ASC design studio in Metro Detroit, and is intended to be equipped with a 5.0 L (310 cu in) supercharged Saleen engine (similar to that used on the 2008 S302E) which will yield 650 hp (659 PS; 485 kW). This will allow it to accelerate to 60 mph (97 km/h) in 3.2 seconds or less and complete the quarter-mile in 10.9 seconds. Expected retail price was US$185,000, roughly US$400,000 less than the S7.

== Awards and recognition ==
- 2009 Best Exotic Concept, DuPont REGISTRY

== In media ==
- The Saleen S5S Raptor is featured in many video games; which include CSR Racing, Forza Motorsport 3, Forza Horizon, Forza Motorsport 4 & Forza Horizon 4 as a playable car.
