= Steve Saleen =

American businessman and former racing driver (born 1949)

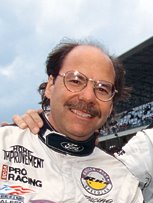
- Saleen at Le Mans in 1997
- Born: Stephen Mark Saleen; April 2, 1949 (age 77); Inglewood, California, U.S.
- Education: Whittier High School
- Alma mater: University of Southern California
- Occupations: Businessman, former racing driver
- Known for: Founder of Saleen, Inc.
- Spouse: Elizabeth Saleen
- Children: 3

Stephen Mark Saleen (born April 2, 1949) is an American businessman and former racing driver. He is best known for being the founder and former vice chairman of Saleen, Inc., originally named Saleen Autosport, which is an OEM manufacturer of specialty vehicles including the Saleen S1, Saleen S7 and highly modified Ford Mustangs.

== Biography ==
=== Early life ===
Born in Inglewood, California, and a 1967 graduate of Whittier High School in Whittier, California, Saleen (pronounced suh-lean) worked at his father's manufacturing business before attending the University of Southern California and graduating with a degree in business.

With an interest in fast cars sparked by his father's purchase of a Porsche, Saleen joined the Porsche Owners Club and worked his way up through the ranks of club racing, which led to a career in professional racing. He entered the Formula Atlantic series where, in 1980, he finished third in the final standings behind eventual champion Jacques Villeneuve. He progressed on to the SCCA Trans-Am Series in 1982, driving a Ford Mustang. From here, a passion for one of Ford's most famous automobiles begin to manifest itself.

=== 1983–99 ===
Saleen formed Saleen Autosport in 1983 and set to building the first Saleen Mustang, equipped with special aerodynamic, suspension and handling packages and a completely redesigned interior. The car was completed in 1984 and was immediately tested against the world's top sports cars with great success, finishing first in its class at the Mosport 24-hour race that year.

In 1995, Saleen formed a race team with comedian Tim Allen and fellow race driver Bob Bondurant, called Saleen/Allen "RRR" Speedlab (the name "RRR" was a play on Allen's "arr arr arr" grunt which had become his trademark in both stand-up comedy and on his television show, Home Improvement). The team raced Saleen Mustangs in the SCCA World Challenge, with Saleen and Allen themselves as the drivers.

In 1996, Saleen was (along with Carroll Shelby) inducted into the Mustang Hall of Fame.

=== 2000–14 ===
In March 2007 Saleen resigned from Saleen, Inc. the company he founded in 1984, to pursue other business opportunities in the automotive sector.

On March 13, 2008, Saleen announced the formation of "SMS Supercars ", Lifestyle Performance Automobiles. Through the years of building the reputation behind each automotive company brand, Saleen maintained close participation throughout product development, sales and marketing. He announced that the focus of SMS is with the high-end of the American Muscle Car and Global Supercar markets. In April 2009, Saleen announced that SMS Supercars will voluntarily honor the warranties of vehicles manufactured by the now-defunct Saleen, Inc.

Nearly 5 years after resigning from Saleen, Inc., on April 2, 2012, Saleen announced that he would once again be associated with the Saleen automotive brand.

=== 2015–present ===
In 2017, Saleen and his business partner Charlie Wang (Xiaolin Wang, in Chinese) formed a joint venture with Rugao, China (a city 107 miles northwest of Shanghai in Jiangsu province), creating a company named "Jiangsu Saleen Automotive Technology" (Chinese: 赛麟汽车) in Rugao, with Charlie Wang as Chairman, CEO, and majority owner of the company. Charlie Wang was a lawyer who had worked at Cadwalader, Wickersham & Taft, from which he abruptly resigned, and then was CEO of Hybrid Kinetic Motors before its owner Yang Rong sued him for re-issuing shares of the company under Wang's own control, and subsequently founded and was CEO of GreenTech Automotive, before it went bankrupt. Only Nantong Jiahe, a state-owned shareholder, invested in Saleen Automobile–it invested CNY3.4 billion (US$481.3 million) and owned 34% of the company; the other four shareholders of the company were shell companies controlled by Wang. The company was to produce and distribute Saleen vehicles in China for the Chinese market. CEO Wang said: "We have adopted highly efficient intelligent production, which will make us one of the very few to do so in China," and that the company would "produce all sorts of passenger cars including sedans, SUVs, and crossovers." He said that he wanted to turn the company into a brand rivaling Porsche.

The company's only mass-produced model that it sold was the low-end pure electric microcar called the "MaiMai", with a maximum speed of 100 km/h and a new European driving cycle range of 305 km, which was introduced in 2019. However, only 27 had sold as of April 2021, and only 31 as of May 2022. It was priced at CNY 160,000 (US$24,048), and had been built at a cost of CNY 5 billion (US$751 million).

In February 2020, the company's new Rugao factory was closed. The Chinese government said that Charlie Wang had embezzled nearly $1 billion in state funds. Wang then absconded to the United States. In June 2020, the Nantong Intermediate People's Court in China seized all of the company's assets, closed two Saleen Auto local factories, froze the equity of four shell companies owned by Wang that in turn were co-owners of Saleen Auto, expelled all of the company's foreign employees, froze the company's bank accounts, and closed Saleen Auto’s Shanghai branch eight months after it had been opened. In July 2020, Wang said that he had returned “back to my good old business as a lawyer and a law professor,” and that the developments with the company was persecution, though he did not name his persecutors; he did not say when he would return to China.

In August 2020, Saleen claimed Chinese government of Jiangsu Province - Rugao filed his 500+ patent without consent and he was ripped off in the intellectual property battle during his JV business in China. The article was published on WSJ. The Nantong Intermediate People's Court put the company up for auction on May 30, 2022, including the company's uncompleted production facility in Rugao that was supposed to be completed in 2019 and be able to produce 150,000 cars per year.

== Personal life ==
Saleen lives in Southern California, with his wife Elizabeth ("Liz"). Saleen has three adult children and seven grandchildren.

== Motorsports career ==
=== SCCA National Championship Runoffs ===
Year	Track	Car	Engine	Class	Finish	Start	Status
1978	Road Atlanta	March 76B	Cosworth	Formula B	16	4	Running
1979	Road Atlanta	March 76B	Cosworth	Formula Atlantic	5	4	Running

=== IndyCar World Series ===
Year	Team	1	2	3	4	5	6	7	8	9	10	11	12	13	14	15	Rank	Points	Ref
1989	Saleen	PHO	LBG; 14	INDY; DNQ	MIL	DET; 14	POR	CLE; 17	MEA	TOR; 12	MCH	POC	MDO; 14	ROA; 25	NAZ	LAG; 13	31st	1	

=== 24 Hours of Le Mans results ===
Year	Team	Co-drivers	Car	Class	Laps	Pos.	Class pos.
1997	(United States) Saleen/Allen Speedlab	(United States) Price Cobb (Spain) Carlos Palau	Saleen Mustang SR	LMGT2	133	DNF	DNF
