= Saleen =

American automobile manufacturer

Saleen Automotive, Inc.
- Formerly: Saleen Autosport
- Type: Private
- Industry: Automotive
- Founded: 1983
- Founder: Steve Saleen
- Headquarters: Corona, California, United States
- Products: Sports cars
- Brands: Maxgrip, Powerflash, Racecraft, S4, Speedlab
- Owner: Steve Saleen
- Number of employees: 80
- Website: www.saleen.com

Saleen Automotive, Inc., commonly known as Saleen (/səˈliːn/), is an American manufacturer of specialty high-performance sports cars and high-performance automotive parts. Saleen is headquartered in Corona, California, in the United States, and privately held.

Saleen's flagship car was the S7, introduced in 2000. The S7 was wholly built by Saleen, and features a mid-engine design in a high-performance sports car package. It is also currently the only Saleen production car not based on an existing design or chassis.

As of 2025 Saleen manufactured the 302 (Mustang derived); the Sportruck and Sportruck XR (Ford F-150 derived); the BIG OLY (Ford Bronco derived); and the Saleen S1, an original sports car in race and street variants.

In 2017, Saleen and partner Charlie Wang (Xiaolin Wang, in Chinese) formed a partnership with the city of Rugao to form Jiangsu Saleen Automotive Technology, with Wang as its CEO. The objective of the joint venture was to produce and distribute Saleen vehicles in China for the Chinese market. The company's only mass-produced model, the Maimai (赛麟迈迈), with a maximum speed of 100 km/h (62 mph) and a new European driving cycle range of 305 km, was introduced in 2019, but only 27 had sold as of April 2021. The Chinese government said that Charlie Wang embezzled nearly $1 billion in state funds, and Wang then absconded to the United States. The Nantong Intermediate People's Court put the company up for auction in May 2022.

== History ==
=== 1980s ===
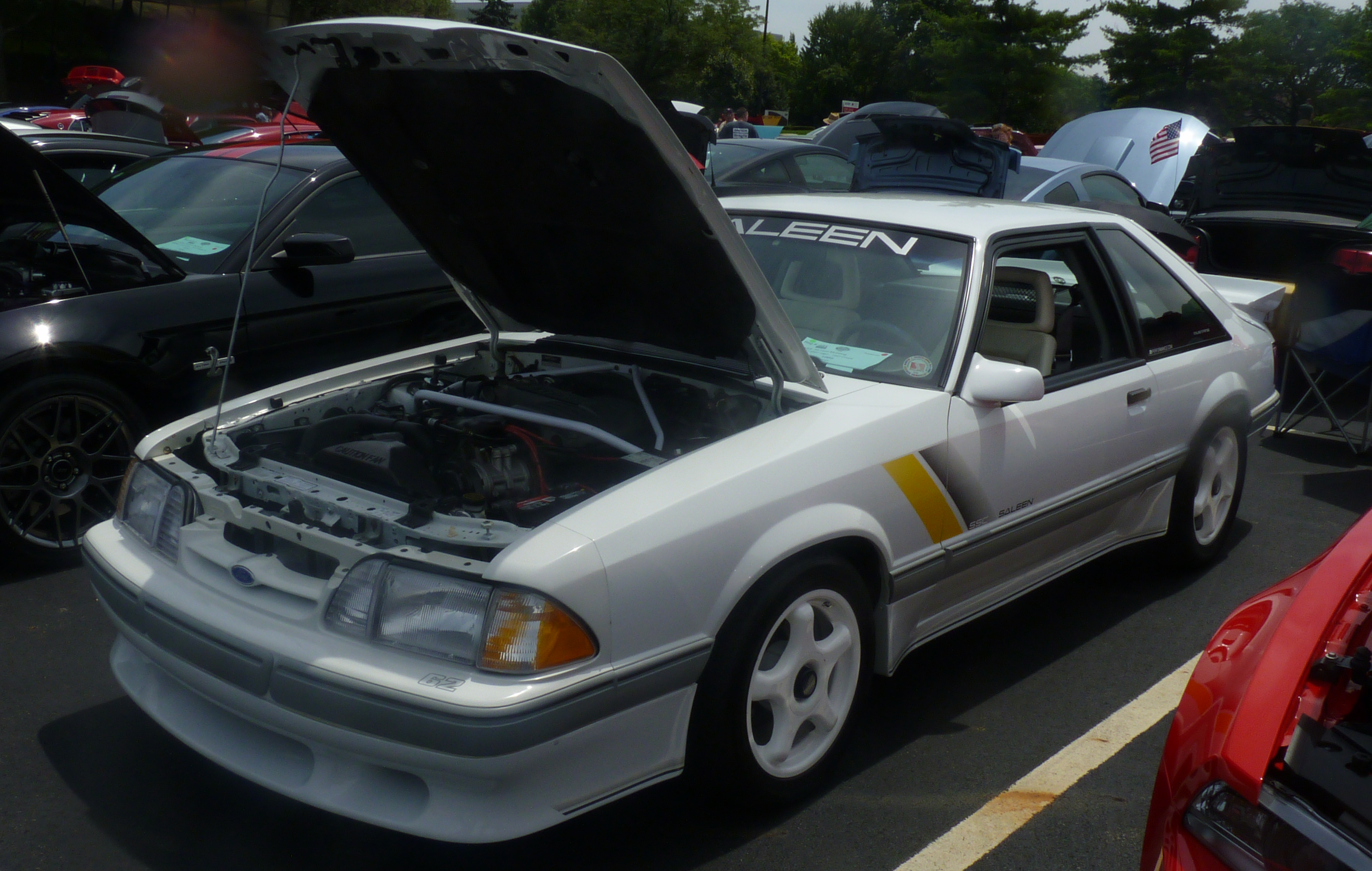
1989 Saleen Mustang SSC

The Saleen brand was established in 1983 originally as "Saleen Autosport" by Steve Saleen, a former professional Formula Atlantic race-car driver. The first Saleens were produced in 1984 when they built three cars as the first production run – a white hatchback, a bright copper-glow five-speed hatchback, and a black hatchback.

In 1985, Steve Saleen put the first certified supercharger on a production Saleen Mustang. This car was delivered to Nault Ford in Manchester, New Hampshire, and was the first use of a centrifugal supercharger on a late-model Mustang.

In 1986, the Saleen made its entry into the Sport Car Club of America race series with a race-prepared version of the Saleen Mustang. A notable win that year at the 24 Hours of Mosport was the catalyst for Saleen vehicles becoming heavily involved in motorsport throughout the rest of the 1980s.

=== 1990s ===
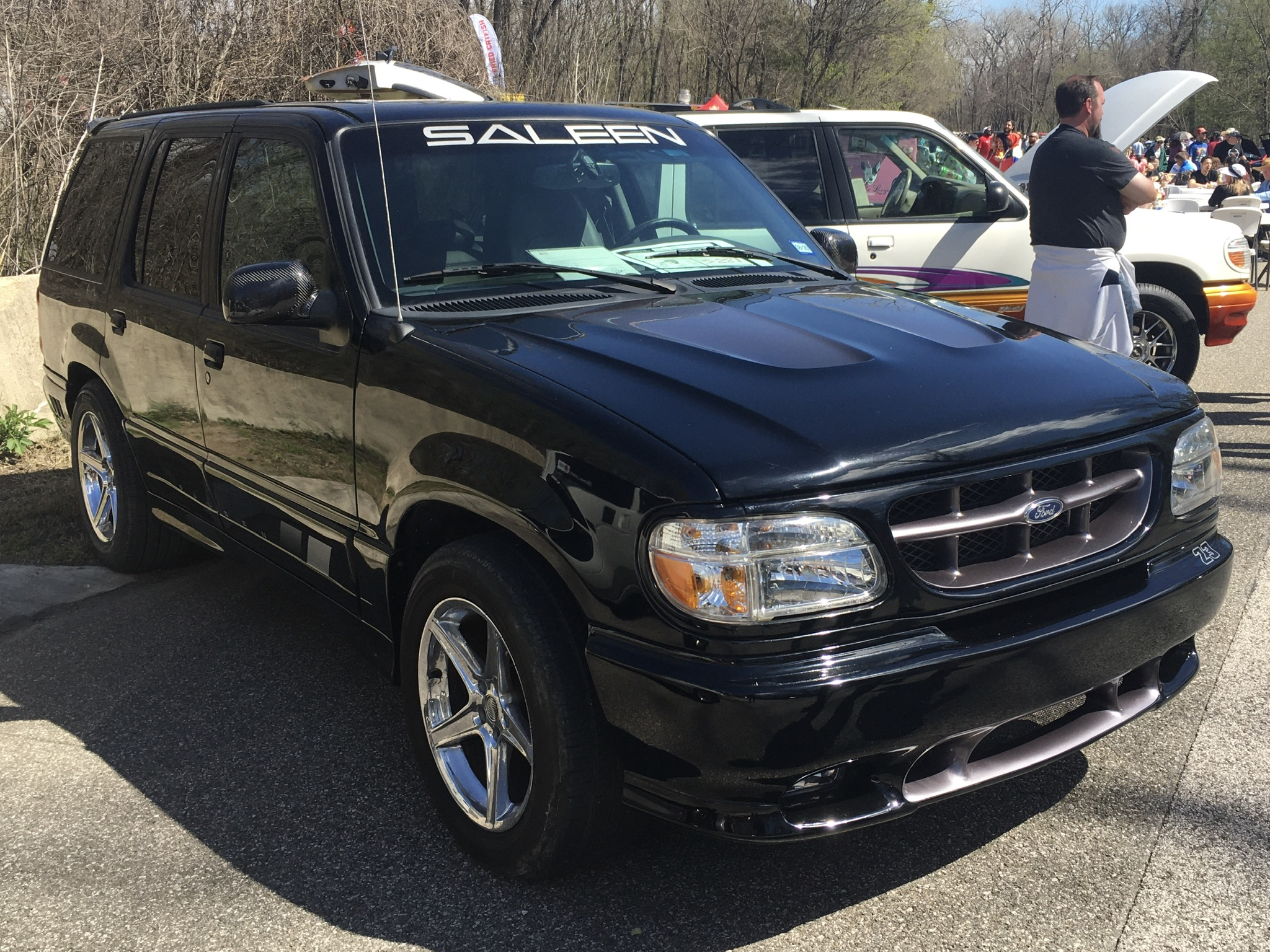
1999 Saleen XP8

In 1990, in response to increased aftermarket parts demand, Saleen established Saleen Performance Parts. In 1994, Saleen debuted the S351, which had a Saleen-built 351 cubic-inch engine. Despite the Mustang GT changing to the modular V8 in 1996, Saleen continued with development of their own EPA-certified 351W engine.

In 1995, Steve Saleen teamed up with comedian Tim Allen and formed the Saleen-Allen "RRR" Speedlab race team. In 1997, Saleen introduced a Saleen Contour concept and an SUV, the Saleen XP8 Explorer. In the late 1990s, the company, founded in 1984, was restructured and became "Saleen, Inc."

=== 2000s ===
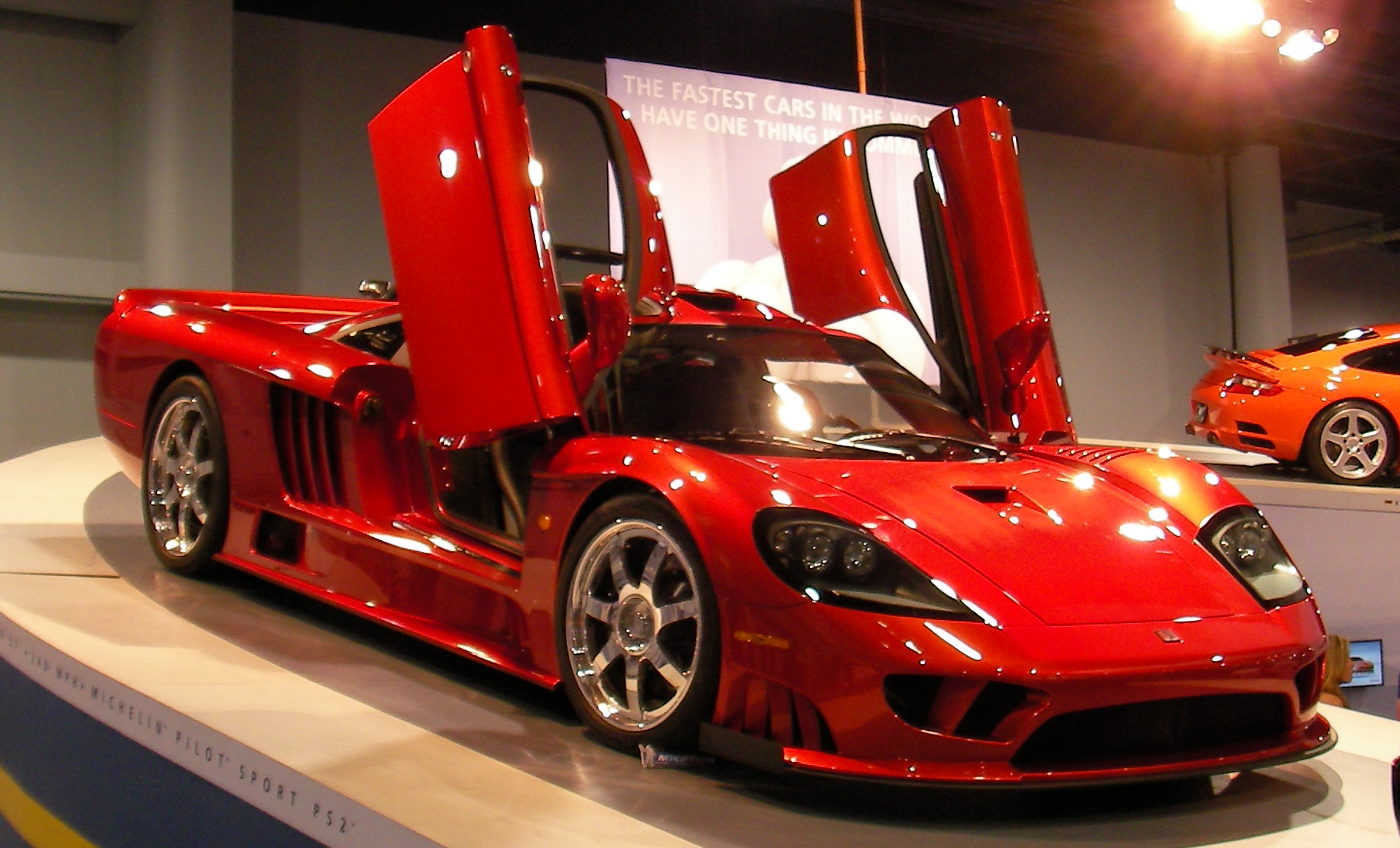
Saleen S7

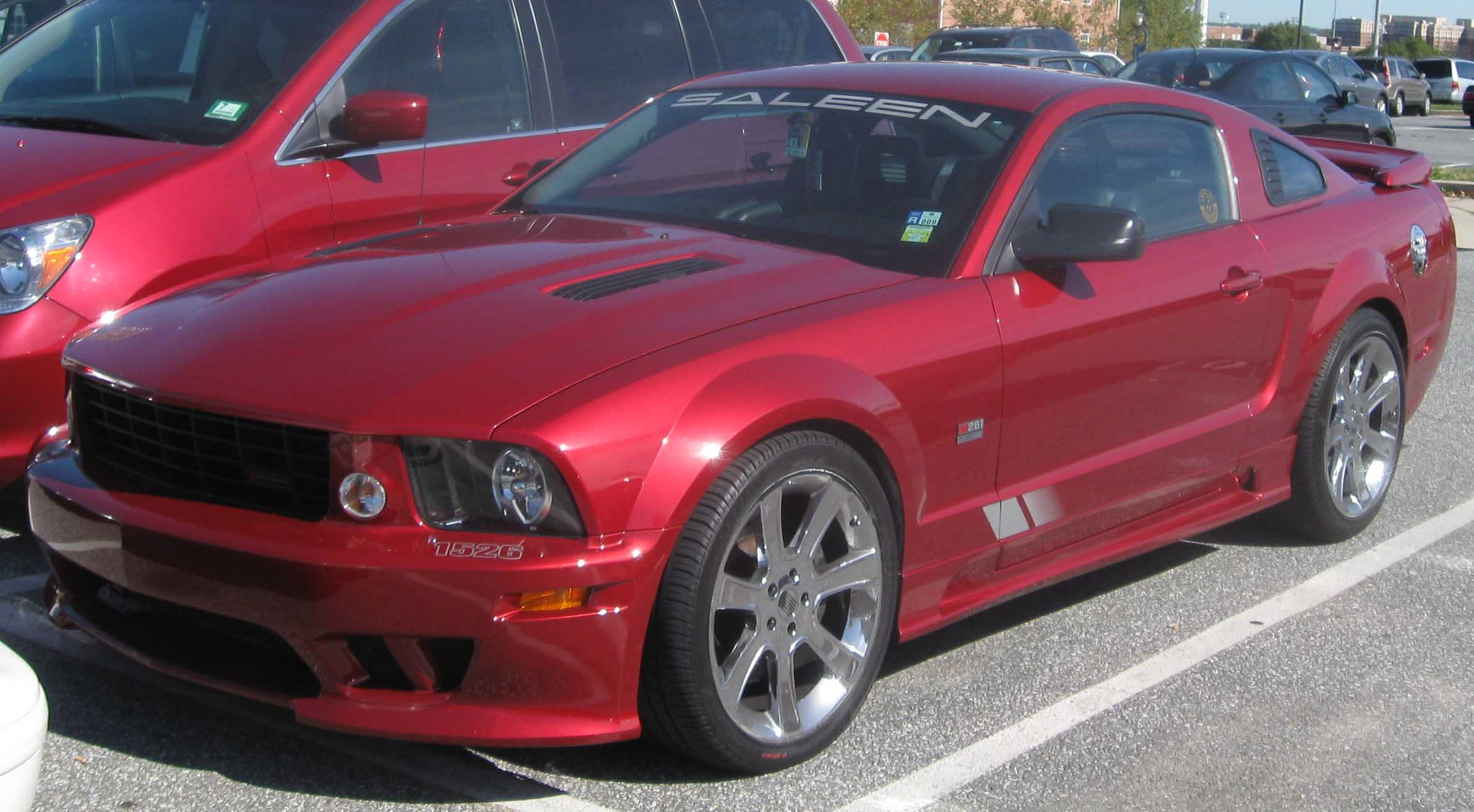
Saleen S281 Mustang

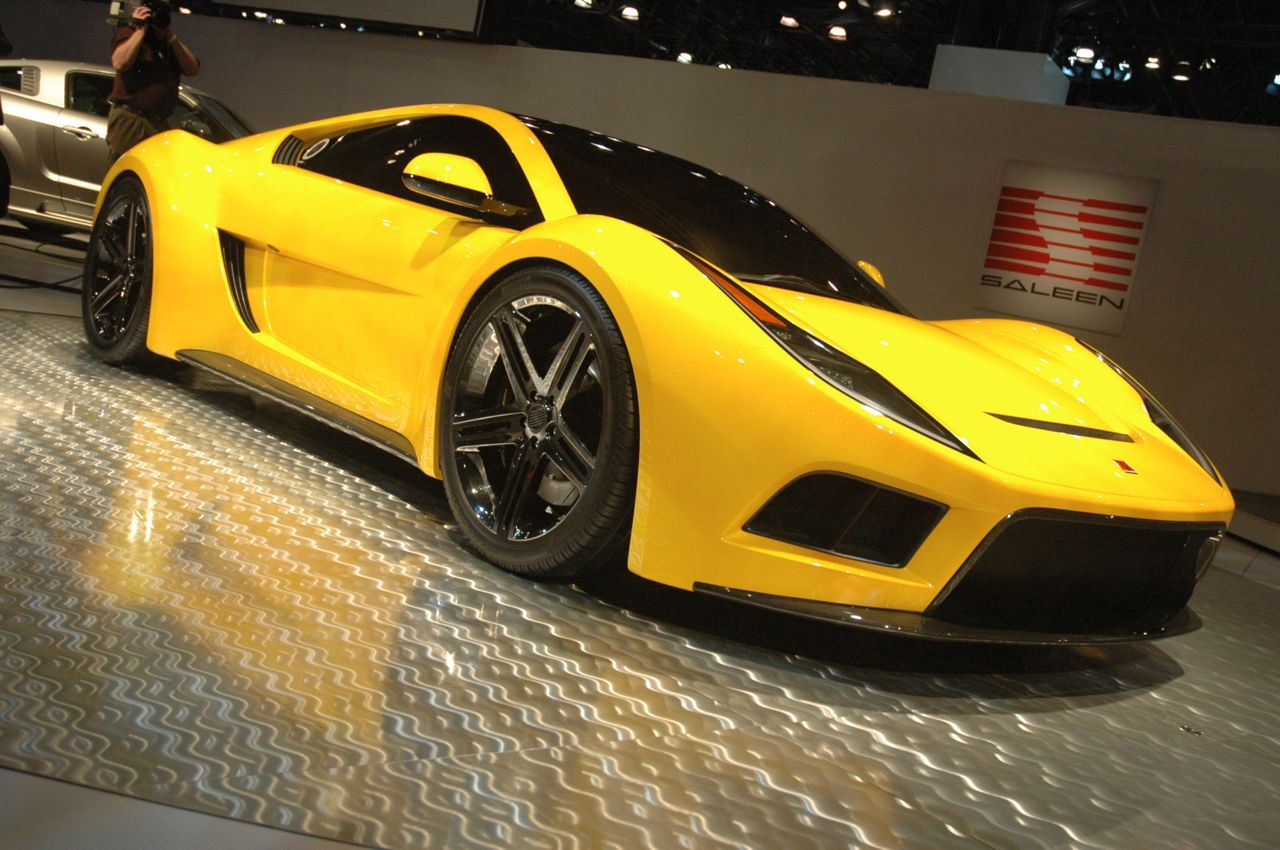
Saleen S5S Raptor concept

In 2000, Saleen introduced its flagship vehicle, the Saleen S7 sports car. The S7 is a mid-engine, high-performance sports car that was initially priced at just under US$400,000. The S7 won four different GT championships in 2001 and has broken records at the prestigious 24 Hours of Le Mans race. The S7 was Saleen's only production car not based on an existing design or chassis.

In 2001, Saleen moved its production facilities to a new 100,000-square-foot facility in Irvine, California.

In 2002, Saleen was awarded the assembly and paint contract for the new Ford sports car, the Ford GT. This effectively made Saleen a tier-1 supplier to the Ford Motor Company. In 2003, Saleen set up a special manufacturing and licensing agreement for distribution of Saleen vehicles in Canada.

In 2004, Saleen expanded its operations and manufacturing to an additional 203,000-square-foot facility in Troy, Michigan. The new $15 million production facility included a high-tech paint facility and assembly line where Saleen produced the Ford GT under contract from Ford Motor Company. In 2005, global distribution was expanded to include Japan under a new partnership with a Tokyo-based importer.

In 2006, Saleen opened its first own-branded retail store in an outdoor shopping center, in Irvine. The showroom was described as a unique shopping experience for Saleen vehicles, parts, and apparel. In 2007, Saleen began working with Chrysler and supplied all the paint work for the new Dodge Viper. In 2009, Saleen released the SMS570 Dodge Challenger.

=== 2010–present ===
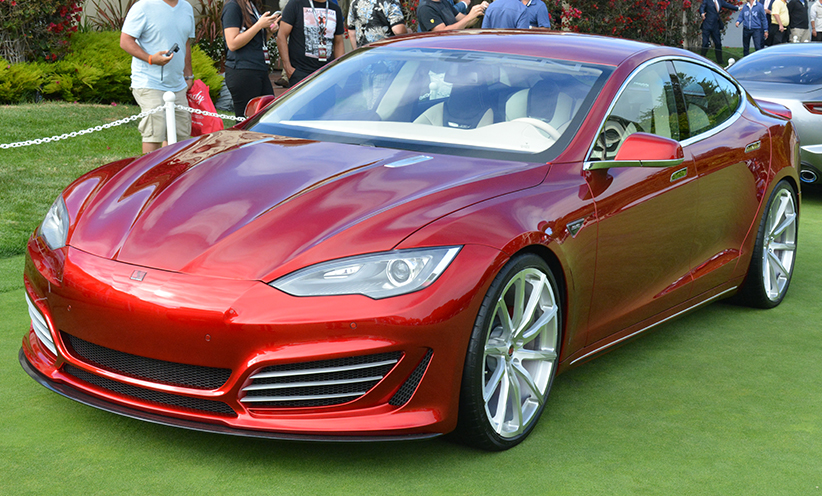
Saleen FourSixteen

In 2010, 2011 Saleen Mustangs were made in Detroit by Revstone, the company that purchased and legally produced 42 Saleens those years. Steve Saleen was selling Mustangs under the SMS name, as he did not legally own the name Saleen. At the end of 2011, an agreement was reached between Ford, Revstone, and Steve Saleen to let him start producing under the Saleen name again.

On June 26, 2013, Saleen became public through a reverse merger. It was listed on the OTC Bulletin Board and is controlled and majority owned by Steve Saleen. Later that year, the Saleen operations, manufacturing, research and development, and paint facilities were announced to be consolidated to a four-acre campus in Southern California.

In 2014, Saleen entered into an agreement to expand vehicle distribution to include China. In August 2014, Saleen unveiled an all-electric performance model, the Foursixteen (a tuned version of the Tesla Model S).

By the end of 2014, the company was in significant debt and on the verge of bankruptcy. During 2015, in an attempt to raise money, the company offered a Saleen Mustang to investors who put up more than $1 million in capital. The company settled a lawsuit with a journalist critical of their business models.

The Securities and Exchange Commission revoked the registration of Saleen's securities on October 12, 2017. The company reverted to being privately held at this time. In 2022, Electrek reported that Saleen was seeking small investors with a minimum of $500 to invest in the company, and that as of September 2021 Saleen had only $14,000 cash on hand.

==== Jiangsu Saleen Automotive Technology ====
===== 2017–19 =====
In 2017, Saleen and his business partner Charlie Wang (Xiaolin Wang, in Chinese) formed a joint venture with Rugao, China (a city 107 miles northwest of Shanghai in Jiangsu province), creating a company named "Jiangsu Saleen Automotive Technology" (Chinese: 赛麟汽车) in Rugao, with Charlie Wang as Chairman, CEO, and majority owner of the company. Charlie Wang was a lawyer who had worked at Cadwalader, Wickersham & Taft, from which he abruptly resigned, and then was CEO of Hybrid Kinetic Motors before its owner Yang Rong sued him for re-issuing shares of the company under Wang's own control, and subsequently founded and was CEO of GreenTech Automotive, before it went bankrupt. Only Nantong Jiahe, a state-owned shareholder, invested in Saleen Automobile–it invested CNY3.4 billion (US$481.3 million) and owned 34% of the company; the other four shareholders of the company were shell companies controlled by Wang. The company was to produce and distribute Saleen vehicles in China for the Chinese market. CEO Wang said: "We have adopted highly efficient intelligent production, which will make us one of the very few to do so in China," and that the company would "produce all sorts of passenger cars including sedans, SUVs, and crossovers." He said that he wanted to turn the company into a brand rivaling Porsche.

The government provided incentives and the company received capital that reportedly enabled the company to invest 17.8 billion yuan (US$2.5 billion) in a first factory, which Wang said would have the capacity to produce 150,000 cars annually. The company then acquired 4 billion yuan, and invested in another factory nearby, which Wang said would produce 50,000 pure electric vehicles and 20,000 super cars annually. CEO Wang said: "Among all EV manufacturers in China, [we are] the most effective. We have rich experience in financial control."

In 2019, the Chinese joint venture presented an updated version of the Saleen S7 (called the S7 Le Mans), at an event which featured actor Jason Statham at the Bird’s Nest stadium in Beijing. In addition to their American sports car, the company also promoted a few Rugao-built vehicles, including a crossover called the "MAC".

The company's only mass-produced model that it sold was the low-end pure electric microcar called the "MaiMai", with a maximum speed of 100 km/h and a new European driving cycle range of 305 km, which was introduced in 2019. However, only 27 had sold as of April 2021, and only 31 as of May 2022. It was priced at CNY 160,000 (US$24,048), and had been built at a cost of CNY 5 billion (US$751 million).

===== 2020–present =====
In February 2020, the company's new Rugao factory was closed.

In April 2020, the former senior legal manager at Saleen, Qiao Yudong, said that company chairman Charles Wang had made false claims about technology investment, and had embezzled millions of dollars from the state by inflating the costs of so-called "car-making technologies." Qiao said that Wang inflated the costs of two car-making technologies valued at US$500,000 and US$20 million, to US$826 million and US$1.1 billion, and then traded them for US$283.2 million in cash and also transferred them into equity ownership, reducing the ownership interests of state-owned investors. The one-third investor Nantong Jiahe conducted a financial audit and suspected Wang of providing false documents, and exploiting his position as CEO to steal large amounts of money, the administrative committee of the Jiangsu Rugao Economic and Technological Development Zone said. The state investor then reported the matter to the police, which accepted the complaint.

in June 2020, the Nantong Intermediate People's Court in China seized all of the company's assets, closed two Saleen Auto local factories, froze the equity of four shell companies owned by Wang that in turn were co-owners of Saleen Auto, expelled all of the company's foreign employees, froze the company's bank accounts, and closed Saleen Auto’s Shanghai branch eight months after it had been opened.

The Chinese government said that Charlie Wang embezzled nearly $1 billion in state funds. Wang then absconded to the United States. In July 2020, Wang said that he had returned “back to my good old business as a lawyer and a law professor,” and that the developments with the company was persecution, though he did not name his persecutors; he did not say when he would return to China. That month, Wang also sued the joint venture's China partner in Hong Kong, alleging it had breached a joint venture agreement and owed CNY300 million (US$42.8 million).

The Nantong Intermediate People's Court put the company up for auction on May 30, 2022, including the company's uncompleted production facility in Rugao that was supposed to be completed in 2019 and be able to produce 150,000 cars per year.

== Products ==
=== Current models ===
	Saleen 302 Mustang	Saleen S1	Saleen Sportruck	Saleen Sportruck XR	Saleen GTX sedan
Engine	302 ci (5.0 L) V-8/302 ci (5.0 L supercharged V-8)	152 ci (2.5 L) turbocharged	164 ci (2.7 L) turbocharged/ 213 ci (3.5 L) turbocharged V6/ 302 ci (V8)	164 ci (2.7 L) turbocharged/ 213 ci (3.5 L) turbocharged V6/ 302 ci 5.0 L V8 302 ci (5.0 L supercharged V-8)	AC induction motor
Power	475–800 hp (354–597 kW)	450 hp (340 kW)	300–700 hp (220–520 kW)	340–700 hp (250–520 kW)	380–691 hp (283–515 kW)
Torque	410–600 lb⋅ft (560–810 N⋅m)	350 lb⋅ft (470 N⋅m)	410–600 lb⋅ft (560–810 N⋅m)	400–600 lb⋅ft (540–810 N⋅m)	
Curb weight	3,705 lb (1,681 kg)	2,685 lb (1,218 kg)	4,069–5,697 lb (1,846–2,584 kg)	4,069–5,697 lb (1,846–2,584 kg)	

=== Legacy models ===
Decade	Production car series	Race specific cars
1980s	Saleen Mustang (1984–1989); SA-5 (1988); SporTruck (1988); SSC (1989)	R Model (1985–1989); R Model Sportruck (1987–1989)
1990s	Saleen Mustang (1990–1993); Saleen SC (1990–1993); SporTruck (1992); SA-10 (1993); S351 (1994–1999); Saleen SR (1994–1999); S281 (1996–1999); SA-15 (1998); XP (1998–1999)	R Model Sportruck (1990–1991); R Model (1990–1993); Saleen SR (1995–1999)
2000s	S281 (2000–2009); Saleen SR (2000–2001); XP (2000–2001); Saleen S7 (2000–2007); SA-20 (2003); S121 Focus (2004–2005); S331 F-150 (2006–2008); S302 Parnelli Jones edition (2007); Supercharged Harley Davidson F-150 (2007–2008); H281 S/C Dan Gurney edition (2008); SMS 25th anniversary (2008); S302 (2008–2009); S570 Challenger (2009)	Saleen SR (2000, 2002); Saleen S7R (2000–2007)
2010s	S302 (2010–present); S570 Challenger (2010–2014); S281 S/C (2010); SMS 460 (2010); S620 Camaro (2012–present); SA–30 (2013); S351 (2013); S302 Saleen/George Follmer edition (2014); FOURSIXTEEN (2014); GTX (2015–present); S1 (2018–present)	

=== Special vehicles ===
These are special vehicles made by Saleen, that were either nonproduction models, concept vehicles, or nonserialized versions.

Year	Model	Description
1986	Ford Tempo	Concept
1988	Special Service Saleens	Saleen built his run of 14 vehicles for Damerow Ford, in Beaverton, Oregon. The dealership purchased the vehicles as "special service vehicles" for law enforcement. Rather than selling them to the state, Damerow sent them to Saleen.
1989–1990	California edition GT Saleens	Nonserialized, these 50 vehicles were built for Ford at Sears Point Raceway and picked up by the dealers from there.
1989	Seal Beach police car	In 1989, Saleen was approached by the Seal Beach Police Department to create a vehicle that had the power, suspension, and braking that would give them an edge in pursuits. Only one car was ever made.
1989	Eagle One giveaway cars	In 1989 and 1990, Eagle One purchased two special-order Saleen hatchbacks each year that were used as promotional vehicles. One was given away to a randomly picked customer, and the other to the highest-selling employee of the Chief Auto Parts chain.
1992–1993	GT Sport by Steve Saleen	Nonserialized
1993	RRR	This one-off S302 was built for actor, comedian, and Saleen driver Tim Allen.
1994	V-6 Sport by Steve Saleen	In 1994, Saleen wanted to offer an "entry-level" car that combined traditional Saleen equipment with a less-expensive powerplant. This model came with a supercharged V-6 that was rated at 220 hp.
1996	Ford Windstar	The Saleen Windstar was another one-off vehicle built specially for Tim Allen.
1999	Ford Contour	Concept
2002–2004	Saleen/Bonspeed Thunderbird	Bonspeed and Saleen teamed up to build a special-edition Thunderbird. Only three were produced before the project was canceled.
2004	Ford Mustang GT-R	The Ford Mustang GT-R concept was produced by Saleen Special Vehicles in Troy, Michigan, and was unveiled at the New York Auto Show by Kid Rock.
2007	Bumblebee and Barricade	Saleen built both the hero car, Bumblebee, and the villain car, Barricade, for the movie Transformers.
2007–2008	Harley-Davidson edition Ford F-150	Saleen Troy produced the HD F-150 S/C for Ford Motor Company. The supercharged option features a Saleen Series VI supercharger, a dual-stage water-to-air intercooler, 39 lb fuel injectors, a high-flow inlet tube, Saleen "Powerflash" performance calibration, and a performance air filter.
2007–2008	S5S Raptor	This concept vehicle was intended as a competitor to the Lamborghini Gallardo and as a follow-on project to the Ford GT. Priced below $200k, the Saleen S5S Raptor was positioned to compete with the best entry-level exotics from Ferrari, Lamborghini, and Aston Martin.
2008–2009	Sleeper GT S/C	The Sleeper edition program was a means to liquidate Mustang GTs that were for Gurney conversion. These were Vista Blue and Performance White coupes.

=== Saleen Performance Parts ===
The aftermarket parts department of the company markets car parts and accessories such as custom wheels, exhaust systems, brakes, and other high-performance parts.

- Superchargers
  - Series I – This was the first supercharger system created by Saleen. It was engineered with an Eaton Roots-type supercharger in 1998.
  - Series II – Launched in 2001, the Series II supercharger was a newer generation Eaton M90 Roots-type.
  - Series III – This was a larger version of the Eaton supercharger. Going from 90 ci of displacement to 112 ci.
  - Series IV – The Series IV switched from a Roots-type supercharger to a twin-screw-type. This version had 1.6 L of displacement.
  - Series V – This marked the first forced-induction system developed entirely in-house by Saleen and designed around Lysholm-sourced compressor screws with 2.3 L of displacement.
  - Series VI – This was very similar to the Series V supercharger with added boost pressure producing more horsepower. This supercharger system was available in versions for the 2005–2009 Ford Mustang, the 2004–2008 Ford F-150 5.4 L truck, Ford Expedition, Lincoln Mark LT, and Lincoln Navigator.
  - Saleen Shakercharger – A ram-air intake system for the Ford Mustang, it incorporated the Saleen Series VI supercharger with a functional hood scoop system borrowing its appearance from the S302PJ. This product was the result of design collaboration among Saleen's engineering interns in 2007 and 2008.
- iPod adapter – a factory-installed option, it was available across all of Saleen's products line that provides for an integrated iPod connection to the radio head unit. Saleen also offered this option as an aftermarket-installed product through their Speedlabs division.
- 2005–2009 Mustang HID headlamps – OEM, DOT approved bi-xenon headlamps offered by Saleen that fit 2005–2009 Mustangs. As of early 2007, these were the only OEM-grade, street-legal HID headlamps available for the Ford Mustang.
- Saleen Mustang Scenic Roof – Available across Saleen's Mustang-based products, this comprises a glass full-roof panel that replaces the traditional Mustang coupe roof in lieu of a sunroof option. The scenic roof was manufactured from tempered laminate glass and fully certified according to U.S. NHTSA standards.
  - Frost Touch Scenic Roof – This is a version of the scenic roof that contains Smart glass, which has the ability to change from clear to opaque by flipping a switch.
- Watt's Link – developed in 2007, Saleen designed a version of the popular Watt's link for 2005–2009 Ford Mustangs.

=== Colorlab Automotive Paints ===
During the development of the Saleen SR in 1995, Saleen formed a strategic partnership with BASF that resulted in the development of unique paint color formulations coupled with advertising centered around Saleen products. During this time, the Saleen paint color "Mystic" was formulated to give the color a chameleon-like effect. In 2014, Saleen signed an agreement that made BASF the exclusive paint supplier for Saleen.

== Motorsport ==
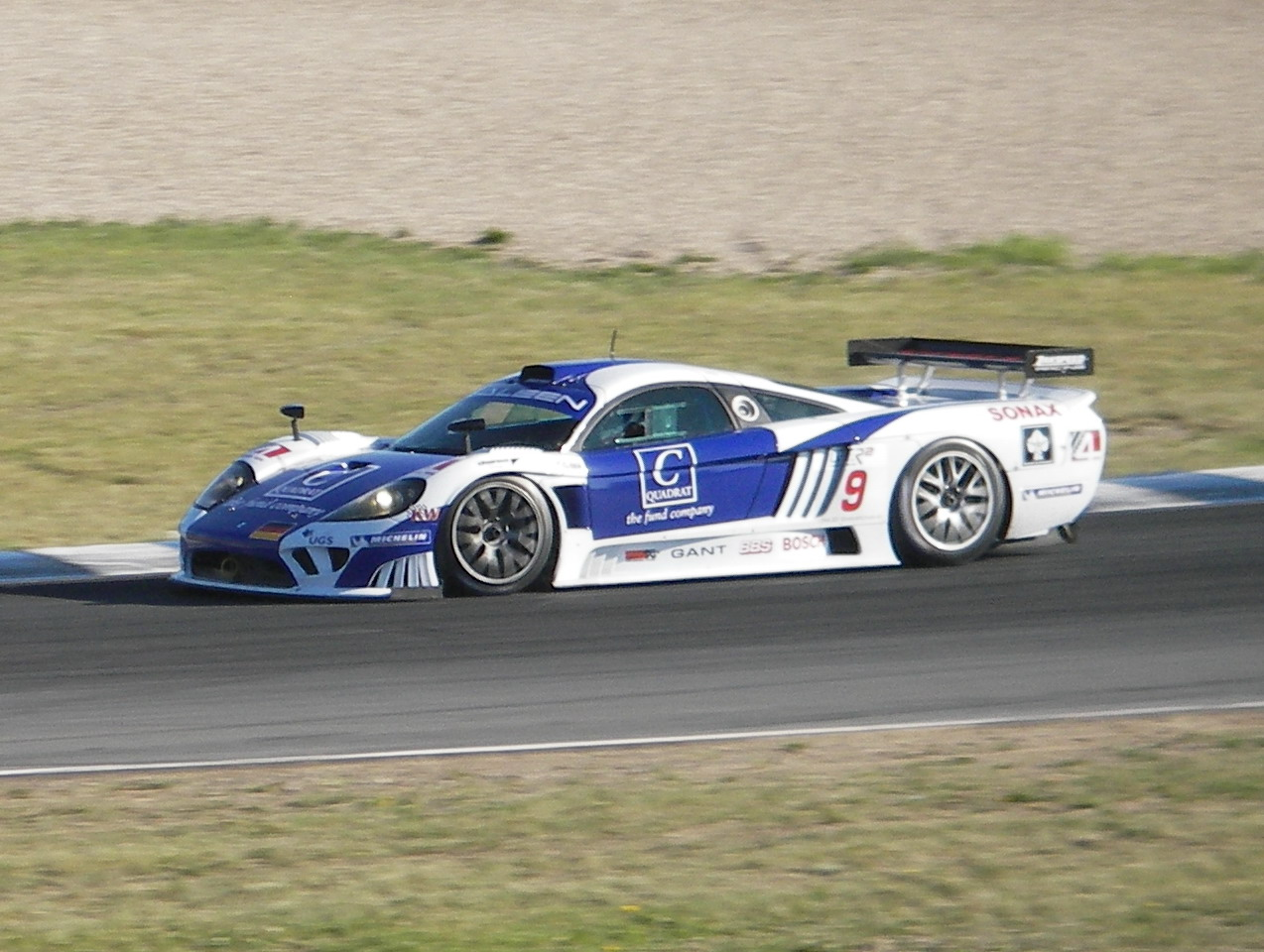
Saleen S7R driven by Sascha Bert

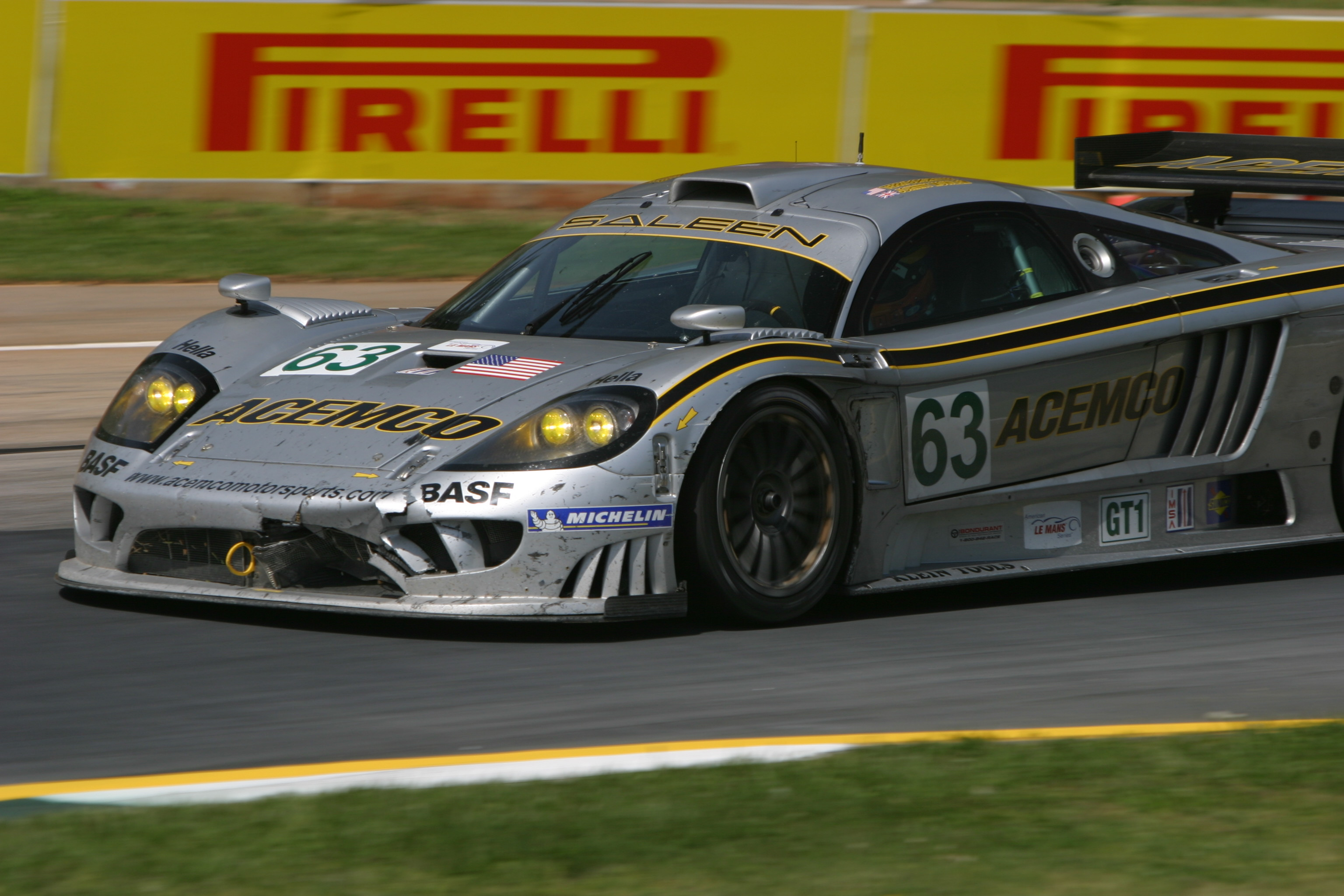
Saleen S7R of ACEMCO Motorsports at 2004 Petit Le Mans

Saleen's birth year of 1984 also marked the first year that a Saleen Mustang was entered into a race, when owner Steve Saleen introduced the first streetcar, the Saleen Mustang, and raced it at Sears Point Raceway, California.

In 1986, Saleen entered the Sports Car Club of America (SCCA) Endurance Series with a race-prepared version of the Saleen Mustang, winning the grueling 24 Hours of Mosport, Canada, with a sponsorship from General Tire.

An SCCA Drivers' Championship went to Saleen in 1987. The Saleen three-car team with drivers Steve Saleen, Parnelli Jones, and George Follmer also captured the Team, Manufacturer, and Tire championships, with sponsorship from General Tire. Saleen entered the SCCA Endurance Series with an all-female driving team including Desire Wilson and Lisa Cacares, who obtained the team's first victory of the season at Sears Point, California. Saleen Autosport also entered a General Tire-backed, Ford Ranger-based, Saleen Sportruck in the SCCA Race Truck Challenge, where they captured two wins.

In 1988, the Saleen race team finished first, second, and third at 24 Hours of Mosport for the third consecutive win and gave Ford its first 1-2-3 finish since LeMans in the late 1960s.

The year 1989 was busy for the Saleen race team. They entered the PPG Indy Car World Series with a team backed by Montgomery Ward. Saleen Mustangs and Sportrucks also continued their winning campaigns in SCCA Competition with General Tire sponsorship.

In 1990, Saleen entered the SCCA Trans-Am series with a Saleen Mustang backed by General Tire.

Adding to their wins in 1991, Saleen won the SCCA Race Truck championship with five victories in six races, which moved Saleen into a tie for the most victories in the series (49) and the Manufacturers' Championship. Owner and driver Steve Saleen campaigned the Trans-Am series with Saleen Mustang with sponsorship from Champion Batteries.

Saleen returned to SCCA Endurance competition in 1993 with a supercharged Saleen in the World Challenge Series.

In 1995, Saleen formed the Saleen/Allen "RRR" Speedlab with Tim Allen. The team of Steve Saleen, Tim Allen, and Bob Bondurant set new track records and won the final race of the SCCA World Challenge series. For 1996, The Saleen/Allen "RRR" Speedlab, with teammates Steve Saleen and Tim Allen won the SCCA Manufacturers’ Championship with the SR Widebody Saleen Mustang. Saleen also won at Watkins Glen International Raceway. In 1997, Saleen/Allen "RRR" Speedlab competed at 24 Hours of Le Mans for the first time, marking the Mustang's first return in over 30 years. Saleen also clinched the SCCA Manufacturers’ Championship title for the third time. 1998 brought more wins for the Saleen/Allen "RRR" Speedlab. The team won both the SCCA Manufacturers' and Drivers' Championship titles. ome 1999, an ex-LeMans Saleen SR won the Spanish FIA GT championship.

In 2000, Saleen competed in the inaugural Grand American Road Racing season, Saleen captured the Drivers' Championship and clinched the Manufacturers' and Team Championships in the season finale at Watkins Glen International Raceway. Saleen customer cars participated in the Speedvision World Challenge—earning a victory at Lime Rock Park. For the 2001 race season, the racing version of the S7, the Saleen S7R, was introduced. The S7R dominated racetracks during its inaugural season. Saleen S7R customer teams won four Drivers’ Championships in four different series (American LeMans, European LeMans, Grand Am, and Spanish GT). Teams driving the S7R achieved 19 wins out of 32 races including the 12 Hours of Sebring. The S7R grabbed 27 poles and set 27 fastest laps, at many tracks, including the prestigious 24 Hours of LeMans. 2002 brought more victories for the S7R. Customer teams continued to operate in four series (American LeMans, Grand Am, British GT, and Spanish GT) winning 18 out of 40 races, three Drivers’ Championships, and several more Team and Manufacturers' Championships. It also won 21 poles and set 23 fastest laps.

In 2004, while Europe watched, the Saleen S7R captured the 1st place win at Imola, Italy, beating home-track favorites Ferrari, Maserati, and Lamborghini, and the debuting Maserati MC-12.

In 2006 the Saleen/Oreca Race Team drove the S7 race version and captured the fastest lap and took the victory at Circuit de Spa-Francorchamps. Saleen also began support of formula race teams in Europe. S7 racecars and spare parts were donated to the effort of trying to win on the European circuit.

=== Saleen racing results ===
Years	Series	Tracks	Teams	Podiums	Fastest Laps	Pole Positions
20	20	98	25	249	126	127

==== 1980s ====
1986	Series	Tracks	Teams	Podiums	Fastest Laps	Pole Positions
1986	1	6	1	6	0	2

1986 Season Details
Series	Track	Team	Chassis	Position	Fastest Lap	Pole Position
SCCA	Sears Point	Saleen Autosport	Saleen R-Model	3rd		
SCCA	Portland	Saleen Autosport	Saleen R-Model	3rd		
SCCA	Nelson	Saleen Autosport	Saleen R-Model	3rd		
SCCA	Nelson	Saleen Autosport	Saleen R-Model	4th		X
SCCA	Road Atlanta	Saleen Autosport	Saleen R-Model	2nd		
SCCA	Road Atlanta	Saleen Autosport	Saleen R-Model	9th		X
SCCA	Mosport	Saleen Autosport	Saleen R-Model	1st		
SCCA	Mosport	Saleen Autosport	Saleen R-Model	DNF		
SCCA	Mid-Ohio	Saleen Autosport	Saleen R-Model	3rd		
SCCA	Mid-Ohio	Saleen Autosport	Saleen R-Model	6th		

1987	Series	Tracks	Teams	Podiums	Fastest Laps	Pole Positions
1987	1	6	1	10	0	2
Manufacturers' Champion

1987 Season Details
Series	Track	Team	Chassis	Position	Fastest Lap	Pole Position
SCCA	Sears Point	Saleen Autosport	Saleen R-Model	1st		
SCCA	Sears Point	Saleen Autosport	Saleen R-Model	3rd		X
SCCA	Portland	Saleen Autosport	Saleen R-Model	1st		
SCCA	Portland	Saleen Autosport	Saleen R-Model	6th		
SCCA	Brainerd	Saleen Autosport	Saleen R-Model	4th		
SCCA	Brainerd	Saleen Autosport	Saleen R-Model	5th		
SCCA	Mosport	Saleen Autosport	Saleen R-Model	1st		
SCCA	Mosport	Saleen Autosport	Saleen R-Model	3rd		
SCCA	Mosport	Saleen Autosport	Saleen R-Model	4th		
SCCA	Road Atlanta	Saleen Autosport	Saleen R-Model	1st		
SCCA	Road Atlanta	Saleen Autosport	Saleen R-Model	3rd		X
SCCA	Road Atlanta	Saleen Autosport	Saleen R-Model	4th		
SCCA	Mid-Ohio	Saleen Autosport	Saleen R-Model	2nd		
SCCA	Mid-Ohio	Saleen Autosport	Saleen R-Model	3rd		
SCCA	Mid-Ohio	Saleen Autosport	Saleen R-Model	5th		
SCCA	Sebring	Saleen Autosport	Saleen R-Model	1st		
SCCA	Sebring	Saleen Autosport	Saleen R-Model	5th		
SCCA	Sebring	Saleen Autosport	Saleen R-Model	DNF		

1988	Series	Tracks	Teams	Podiums	Fastest Laps	Pole Positions
1988	1	6	1	10	0	0

1988 Season Details
Series	Track	Team	Chassis	Position	Fastest Lap	Pole Position
SCCA	Sears Point	Saleen Autosport	Saleen R-Model	2nd		
SCCA	Sears Point	Saleen Autosport	Saleen R-Model	3rd		
SCCA	Sears Point	Saleen Autosport	Saleen R-Model	4th		
SCCA	Portland	Saleen Autosport	Saleen R-Model	3rd		
SCCA	Portland	Saleen Autosport	Saleen R-Model	5th		
SCCA	Portland	Saleen Autosport	Saleen R-Model	6th		
SCCA	Brainerd	Saleen Autosport	Saleen R-Model	3rd		
SCCA	Brainerd	Saleen Autosport	Saleen R-Model	4th		
SCCA	Brainerd	Saleen Autosport	Saleen R-Model	10th		
SCCA	Mosport	Saleen Autosport	Saleen R-Model	1st		
SCCA	Mosport	Saleen Autosport	Saleen R-Model	2nd		
SCCA	Mosport	Saleen Autosport	Saleen R-Model	3rd		
SCCA	Road America	Saleen Autosport	Saleen R-Model	3rd		
SCCA	Road America	Saleen Autosport	Saleen R-Model	5th		
SCCA	Road America	Saleen Autosport	Saleen R-Model	9th		
SCCA	Road Atlanta	Saleen Autosport	Saleen R-Model	3rd		
SCCA	Road Atlanta	Saleen Autosport	Saleen R-Model	4th		
SCCA	Road Atlanta	Saleen Autosport	Saleen R-Model	10th		
SCCA	Mid-Ohio	Saleen Autosport	Saleen R-Model	2nd		
SCCA	Mid-Ohio	Saleen Autosport	Saleen R-Model	4th		
SCCA	Mid-Ohio	Saleen Autosport	Saleen R-Model	10th		
SCCA	Sebring	Saleen Autosport	Saleen R-Model	14th		
SCCA	Sebring	Saleen Autosport	Saleen R-Model	DSQ		
SCCA	Sebring	Saleen Autosport	Saleen R-Model	DSQ		

1989	Series	Tracks	Teams	Podiums	Fastest Laps	Pole Positions
1989	1	8	1	4	0	0

1989 Season Details
Series	Track	Team	Chassis	Position	Fastest Lap	Pole Position
SCCA	Sears Point	Saleen Autosport	Saleen R-Model	3rd		
SCCA	Sears Point	Saleen Autosport	Saleen R-Model	4th		
SCCA	Mid-Ohio	Saleen Autosport	Saleen R-Model	6th		
SCCA	Mid-Ohio	Saleen Autosport	Saleen R-Model	7th		
SCCA	Brainerd	Saleen Autosport	Saleen R-Model	9th		
SCCA	Brainerd	Saleen Autosport	Saleen R-Model	11th		
SCCA	Lime Rock	Saleen Autosport	Saleen R-Model	2nd		
SCCA	Lime Rock	Saleen Autosport	Saleen R-Model	3rd		
SCCA	Mosport	Saleen Autosport	Saleen R-Model	5th		
SCCA	Mosport	Saleen Autosport	Saleen R-Model	9th		
SCCA	Road Atlanta	Saleen Autosport	Saleen R-Model	3rd		
SCCA	Road Atlanta	Saleen Autosport	Saleen R-Model	8th		
SCCA	Blackhawk Farms	Saleen Autosport	Saleen R-Model	6th		
SCCA	Blackhawk Farms	Saleen Autosport	Saleen R-Model	7th		
SCCA	Heartland Park	Saleen Autosport	Saleen R-Model	6th		

==== 1990s ====
1995	Series	Tracks	Teams	Podiums	Fastest Laps	Pole Positions
1995	1	7	1	2	2	2

1995 Season Details
Series	Track	Team	Chassis	Position	Fastest Lap	Pole Position
SCCA	Phoenix	Saleen/Allen RRR	Saleen R-Model	7th		
SCCA	Phoenix	Saleen/Allen RRR	Saleen R-Model	DNF		
SCCA	Mosport	Saleen/Allen RRR	Saleen R-Model	DNF		
SCCA	Mosport	Saleen/Allen RRR	Saleen R-Model	DNF		
SCCA	Lime Rock	Saleen/Allen RRR	Saleen R-Model	4th		
SCCA	Road America	Saleen/Allen RRR	Saleen R-Model	6th		
SCCA	Road America	Saleen/Allen RRR	Saleen R-Model	DNF		
SCCA	Road America	Saleen/Allen RRR	Saleen R-Model	DNF		
SCCA	Circuit Trois-Rivières	Saleen/Allen RRR	Saleen R-Model	4th		
SCCA	Circuit Trois-Rivières	Saleen/Allen RRR	Saleen R-Model	8th		
SCCA	Road Atlanta	Saleen/Allen RRR	Saleen R-Model	3rd		X
SCCA	Road Atlanta	Saleen/Allen RRR	Saleen R-Model	4th	X	
SCCA	Road Atlanta	Saleen/Allen RRR	Saleen R-Model	7th		
SCCA	Road Atlanta	Saleen/Allen RRR	Saleen R-Model	DNF		X
SCCA	Sears Point	Saleen/Allen RRR	Saleen R-Model	1st	X	
SCCA	Sears Point	Saleen/Allen RRR	Saleen R-Model	7th		
SCCA	Sears Point	Saleen/Allen RRR	Saleen R-Model	DNF		

1996	Series	Tracks	Teams	Podiums	Fastest Laps	Pole Positions
1996	1	9	1	7	5	0
Manufacturers' Champion

1996 Season Details
Series	Track	Team	Chassis	Position	Fastest Lap	Pole Position
SCCA	St Petersburg	Saleen/Allen RRR	Saleen SR	7th		
SCCA	St Petersburg	Saleen/Allen RRR	Saleen SR	9th		
SCCA	Mosport	Saleen/Allen RRR	Saleen SR	DNF	X	
SCCA	Mosport	Saleen/Allen RRR	Saleen SR	DNF		
SCCA	Lime Rock	Saleen/Allen RRR	Saleen SR	2nd	X	
SCCA	Lime Rock	Saleen/Allen RRR	Saleen SR	3rd		
SCCA	Minneapolis	Saleen/Allen RRR	Saleen SR	DNF		
SCCA	Minneapolis	Saleen/Allen RRR	Saleen SR	DNF		
SCCA	Road America	Saleen/Allen RRR	Saleen SR	3rd		
SCCA	Road America	Saleen/Allen RRR	Saleen SR	8th		
SCCA	Road America	Saleen/Allen RRR	Saleen SR	DNF		
SCCA	Circuit Trois-Rivières	Saleen/Allen RRR	Saleen SR	DNF		
SCCA	Circuit Trois-Rivières	Saleen/Allen RRR	Saleen SR	3rd		
SCCA	Watkins Glen	Saleen/Allen RRR	Saleen SR	7th		
SCCA	Watkins Glen	Saleen/Allen RRR	Saleen SR	1st	X	
SCCA	Reno Street Circuit	Saleen/Allen RRR	Saleen SR	1st	X	
SCCA	Reno Street Circuit	Saleen/Allen RRR	Saleen SR	7th		
SCCA	Sears Point	Saleen/Allen RRR	Saleen SR	2nd	X	
SCCA	Sears Point	Saleen/Allen RRR	Saleen SR	4th		
SCCA	Sears Point	Saleen/Allen RRR	Saleen SR	13th		

1997	Series	Tracks	Teams	Podiums	Fastest Laps	Pole Positions
1997	2	8	1	0	0	0
Manufacturers' Champion

1997 Season Details
Series	Track	Team	Chassis	Position	Fastest Lap	Pole Position
FIA GT Championship	Silverstone	Saleen/Allen Speedlab	Saleen SR	19th		
FIA GT Championship	Silverstone	Saleen/Allen Speedlab	Saleen SR	21st		
FIA GT Championship	Silverstone	Saleen/Allen Speedlab	Saleen SR	DNF		
FIA GT Championship	Circuit de Spa-Francorchamps	Saleen/Allen Speedlab	Saleen SR	13th		
FIA GT Championship	Circuit de Spa-Francorchamps	Saleen/Allen Speedlab	Saleen SR	DNF		
FIA GT Championship	Laguna Seca	Saleen/Allen Speedlab	Saleen SR	DNF		
IMSA	Daytona	Saleen/Allen Speedlab	Saleen SR	10th		
IMSA	Daytona	Saleen/Allen Speedlab	Saleen SR	9th		
IMSA	Sebring	Saleen/Allen Speedlab	Saleen SR	5th		
IMSA	Sebring	Saleen/Allen Speedlab	Saleen SR	7th		
IMSA	Road America	Saleen/Allen Speedlab	Saleen SR	13th		
IMSA	Las Vegas	Saleen/Allen Speedlab	Saleen SR	4th		
IMSA	Laguna Seca	Saleen/Allen Speedlab	Saleen SR	6th		
Manufacturers' Champion

1998	Series	Tracks	Teams	Podiums	Fastest Laps	Pole Positions
1998	2	11	1	11	6	8
Manufacturers' Champion

1998 Season Details
Series	Track	Team	Chassis	Position	Fastest Lap	Pole Position
IMSA	Sebring	Saleen/Allen Speedlab	Saleen SR	2nd		X
IMSA	Laguna Seca	Saleen/Allen Speedlab	Saleen SR	6th		
SCCA	Heartland Park	Saleen/Allen Speedlab	Saleen SR	2nd		
SCCA	Heartland Park	Saleen/Allen Speedlab	Saleen SR	DNF		
SCCA	Lime Rock	Saleen/Allen Speedlab	Saleen SR	2nd		
SCCA	Lime Rock	Saleen/Allen Speedlab	Saleen SR	DNF	X	X
SCCA	Mid-Ohio	Saleen/Allen Speedlab	Saleen SR	1st	X	X
SCCA	Mid-Ohio	Saleen/Allen Speedlab	Saleen SR	2nd		
SCCA	Minneapolis	Saleen/Allen Speedlab	Saleen SR	2nd	X	X
SCCA	Minneapolis	Saleen/Allen Speedlab	Saleen SR	4th		
SCCA	Grand Rapids	Saleen/Allen Speedlab	Saleen SR	2nd		X
SCCA	Grand Rapids	Saleen/Allen Speedlab	Saleen SR	7th		
SCCA	Grand Rapids	Saleen/Allen Speedlab	Saleen SR	DNF		
SCCA	Circuit Trois-Rivières	Saleen/Allen Speedlab	Saleen SR	1st		
SCCA	Circuit Trois-Rivières	Saleen/Allen Speedlab	Saleen SR	DNF		
SCCA	Road America	Saleen/Allen Speedlab	Saleen SR	1st		X
SCCA	Road America	Saleen/Allen Speedlab	Saleen SR	4th	X	
SCCA	Watkins Glen	Saleen/Allen Speedlab	Saleen SR	1st	X	X
SCCA	Watkins Glen	Saleen/Allen Speedlab	Saleen SR	12th		
SCCA	Pikes Peak	Saleen/Allen Speedlab	Saleen SR	1st	X	X
SCCA	Pikes Peak	Saleen/Allen Speedlab	Saleen SR	7th		
Manufacturers' Champion

1999	Series	Tracks	Teams	Podiums	Fastest Laps	Pole Positions
1999	1	7	1	1	0	0
Manufacturers' Champion

1999 Season Details
Series	Track	Team	Chassis	Position	Fastest Lap	Pole Position
ALMS	Sebring	Saleen/Allen Speedlab	Saleen SR	11th		
ALMS	Road America	Saleen/Allen Speedlab	Saleen SR	4th		
ALMS	Mosport	Saleen/Allen Speedlab	Saleen SR	3rd		
ALMS	Sears Point	Saleen/Allen Speedlab	Saleen SR	4th		
ALMS	Portland	Saleen/Allen Speedlab	Saleen SR	6th		
ALMS	Petit Le Mans	Saleen/Allen Speedlab	Saleen SR	9th		
ALMS	Laguna Seca	Saleen/Allen Speedlab	Saleen SR	7th		
ALMS	Las Vegas	Saleen/Allen Speedlab	Saleen SR	6th		
Manufacturers' Champion

==== 2000s ====
2000	Series	Tracks	Teams	Podiums	Fastest Laps	Pole Positions
2000	3	9	1	8	5	10
Manufacturers' Champion

2000 Season Details
Series	Track	Team	Chassis	Position	Fastest Lap	Pole Position
ALMS	Laguna Seca	Saleen/Allen Speedlab	Saleen SR	6th		
Grand-Am	Phoenix	Saleen/Allen Speedlab	Saleen SR	1st	X	X
Grand-Am	Homestead	Saleen/Allen Speedlab	Saleen SR	1st	X	X
Grand-Am	Lime Rock	Saleen/Allen Speedlab	Saleen SR	1st	X	X
Grand-Am	Mid-Ohio	Saleen/Allen Speedlab	Saleen SR	2nd	X	
Grand-Am	Daytona	Saleen/Allen Speedlab	Saleen SR	4th		X
Grand-Am	Road America	Saleen/Allen Speedlab	Saleen SR	1st		X
Grand-Am	Circuit Trois-Rivières	Saleen/Allen Speedlab	Saleen SR	1st	X	X
Grand-Am	Watkins Glen	Saleen/Allen Speedlab	Saleen SR	1st		X
Sports Racing World Cup	Daytona	Saleen/Allen Speedlab	Saleen SR	4th		X
Sports Racing World Cup	Road America	Saleen/Allen Speedlab	Saleen SR	1st		X
Sports Racing World Cup	Road America	Saleen/Allen Speedlab	Saleen SR	5th		X
Manufacturers' Champion

2001	Series	Tracks	Teams	Podiums	Fastest Laps	Pole Positions
2001	5	24	7	34	26	24
Manufacturers' Champion

2001 Season Details
Series	Track	Team	Chassis	Position	Fastest Lap	Pole Position
24 Hours of Le Mans	Le Mans	Konrad Motorsport	Saleen S7R	DNF		
24 Hours of Le Mans	Le Mans	RML Group	Saleen S7R	DNF	X	
24 Hours of Le Mans	Le Mans	Saleen/Allen	Saleen S7R	3rd		X
ALMS	Sebring	Konrad Motorsport	Saleen S7R	1st	X	X
ALMS	Sears Point	Konrad Motorsport	Saleen S7R	3rd	X	
ALMS	Portland	Konrad Motorsport	Saleen S7R	3rd	X	X
ALMS	Mosport	Konrad Motorsport	Saleen S7R	2nd	X	X
ALMS	Mid-Ohio	Konrad Motorsport	Saleen S7R	3rd	X	X
ALMS	Laguna Seca	Konrad Motorsport	Saleen S7R	1st	X	X
ALMS	Petit Le Mans	Konrad Motorsport	Saleen S7R	2nd		
ALMS	Petit Le Mans	Konrad Motorsport	Saleen S7R	6th		
ELMS	Sebring	Konrad Motorsport	Saleen S7R	1st		X
ELMS	Donington Park	Konrad Motorsport	Saleen S7R	2nd	X	X
ELMS	Circuito del Jarama	Konrad Motorsport	Saleen S7R	1st	X	X
ELMS	Autódromo do Estoril	Konrad Motorsport	Saleen S7R	2nd	X	X
ELMS	ACI Vallelunga Circuit	Konrad Motorsport	Saleen S7R	3rd		
ELMS	Petit Le Mans	Park Place Motorsports	Saleen S7R	4th		
ELMS	Donington Park	RML Group	Saleen S7R	1st		
ELMS	Circuito del Jarama	RML Group	Saleen S7R	3rd		
ELMS	Autódromo do Estoril	RML Group	Saleen S7R	1st		
ELMS	Autodrom Most	RML Group	Saleen S7R	1st	X	X
ELMS	ACI Vallelunga Circuit	RML Group	Saleen S7R	1st	X	X
Grand-Am	Homestead	Park Place Motorsports	Saleen S7R	1st	X	X
Grand-Am	Phoenix	Park Place Motorsports	Saleen S7R	2nd		X
Grand-Am	Watkins Glen	Park Place Motorsports	Saleen S7R	1st	X	X
Grand-Am	Lime Rock	Park Place Motorsports	Saleen S7R	DNF		
Grand-Am	Mid Ohio	Park Place Motorsports	Saleen S7R	1st	X	X
Grand-Am	Road America	Park Place Motorsports	Saleen S7R	1st	X	X
Grand-Am	Circuit Trois-Rivières	Park Place Motorsports	Saleen S7R	1st	X	X
Grand-Am	Watkins Glen	Park Place Motorsports	Saleen S7R	1st	X	X
Grand-Am	Daytona	Park Place Motorsports	Saleen S7R	1st	X	
Grand-Am	Daytona	Rocketsports Racing	Saleen S7R	11th		X
Grand-Am	Circuit Trois-Rivières	TF Racing	Saleen S7R	3rd		
Grand-Am	Circuit Trois-Rivières	TF Racing	Saleen S7R	4th		
Spanish GT	Circuito del Jarama	Palau Motorsports	Saleen S7R	DNF		
Spanish GT	Circuit de Valencia	Palau Motorsports	Saleen S7R	1st	X	X
Spanish GT	Circuit de Valencia	Palau Motorsports	Saleen S7R	2nd		
Spanish GT	Autódromo do Estoril	Palau Motorsports	Saleen S7R	1st	X	X
Spanish GT	Autódromo do Estoril	Palau Motorsports	Saleen S7R	7th		
Spanish GT	Circuito de Albacete	Palau Motorsports	Saleen S7R	1st	X	X
Spanish GT	Circuito de Albacete	Palau Motorsports	Saleen S7R	DNF		
Spanish GT	Circuito de Jerez	Palau Motorsports	Saleen S7R	1st	X	
Spanish GT	Circuito de Jerez	Palau Motorsports	Saleen S7R	3rd		
Spanish GT	Circuit de Barcelona-Catalunya	Palau Motorsports	Saleen S7R	2nd	X	
Manufacturers' Champion

2002	Series	Tracks	Teams	Podiums	Fastest Laps	Pole Positions
2002	5	33	5	37	25	21
Manufacturers' Champion

2002 Season Details
Series	Track	Team	Chassis	Position	Fastest Lap	Pole Position
24 Hours of Le Mans	Circuit de la Sarthe	Konrad Motorsport	Saleen S7R	7th		X
24 Hours of Le Mans	Circuit de la Sarthe	Konrad Motorsport	Saleen S7R	DNF		
24 Hours of Le Mans	Circuit de la Sarthe	RML Group	Saleen S7R	5th		
ALMS	Sebring	Graham Nash	Saleen S7R	DNF		
ALMS	Bayfront Park	Graham Nash	Saleen S7R	7th		
ALMS	Petit Le Mans	Graham Nash	Saleen S7R	DNF		
ALMS	Sebring	Konrad Motorsport	Saleen S7R	2nd	X	
ALMS	Sebring	Konrad Motorsport	Saleen S7R	DNF		
ALMS	Sears Point Raceway	Konrad Motorsport	Saleen S7R	3rd	X	
ALMS	Mid-Ohio	Konrad Motorsport	Saleen S7R	4th	X	
ALMS	Road America	Konrad Motorsport	Saleen S7R	DNF	X	
ALMS	RFK Stadium Street Circuit	Konrad Motorsport	Saleen S7R	4th		
ALMS	Circuit Trois-Rivières	Konrad Motorsport	Saleen S7R	DNF		
ALMS	Mosport	Konrad Motorsport	Saleen S7R	3rd	X	
ALMS	Laguna Seca	Konrad Motorsport	Saleen S7R	2nd		
ALMS	Bayfront Park	Konrad Motorsport	Saleen S7R	6th		
ALMS	Bayfront Park	Konrad Motorsport	Saleen S7R	DNF		X
ALMS	Petit Le Mans	Konrad Motorsport	Saleen S7R	5th	X	
ALMS	Petit Le Mans	Konrad Motorsport	Saleen S7R	6th		
ALMS	Sebring	Park Place	Saleen S7R	DNF		
British GT	Brands Hatch	Graham Nash	Saleen S7R	1st	X	X
British GT	Donington Park	Graham Nash	Saleen S7R	DNF	X	
British GT	Silverstone Circuit	Graham Nash	Saleen S7R	1st	X	X
British GT	Knockhill Racing Circuit	Graham Nash	Saleen S7R	1st	X	
British GT	Knockhill Racing Circuit	Graham Nash	Saleen S7R	2nd		X
British GT	Croft Circuit	Graham Nash	Saleen S7R	1st		X
British GT	Croft Circuit	Graham Nash	Saleen S7R	4th	X	
British GT	Silverstone Circuit	Graham Nash	Saleen S7R	1st	X	
British GT	Silverstone Circuit	Graham Nash	Saleen S7R	3rd		
British GT	Castle Combe Circuit	Graham Nash	Saleen S7R	2nd		
British GT	Castle Combe Circuit	Graham Nash	Saleen S7R	DNF		
British GT	Rockingham Motor Speedway	Graham Nash	Saleen S7R	1st	X	X
British GT	Rockingham Motor Speedway	Graham Nash	Saleen S7R	2nd		
British GT	Oulton Park	Graham Nash	Saleen S7R	1st		
British GT	Oulton Park	Graham Nash	Saleen S7R	DNF		
British GT	Oulton Park	Graham Nash	Saleen S7R	DNF		
British GT	Snetterton Motor Racing Circuit	Graham Nash	Saleen S7R	1st	X	
British GT	Snetterton Motor Racing Circuit	Graham Nash	Saleen S7R	2nd		
British GT	Thruxton Circuit	Graham Nash	Saleen S7R	1st		
British GT	Thruxton Circuit	Graham Nash	Saleen S7R	2nd		
British GT	Donington Park	Graham Nash	Saleen S7R	2nd		X
British GT	Donington Park	Graham Nash	Saleen S7R	DNF		X
Grand-Am	Daytona International Speedway	Graham Nash	Saleen S7R	1st		
Grand-Am	Daytona International Speedway	Graham Nash	Saleen S7R	7th		
Grand-Am	Daytona International Speedway	Konrad Motorsport	Saleen S7R	2nd	X	X
Grand-Am	Daytona International Speedway	Konrad Motorsport	Saleen S7R	3rd	X	
Grand-Am	Daytona International Speedway	Park Place Motorsports	Saleen S7R	9th		X
Grand-Am	Daytona International Speedway	Park Place Motorsports	Saleen S7R	11th		
Grand-Am	Homestead-Miami Speedway	Park Place Motorsports	Saleen S7R	1st		X
Grand-Am	Auto Club Speedway	Park Place Motorsports	Saleen S7R	1st	X	X
Grand-Am	Phoenix International Raceway	Park Place Motorsports	Saleen S7R	1st	X	X
Grand-Am	Watkins Glen International	Park Place Motorsports	Saleen S7R	3rd	X	X
Grand-Am	Daytona International Speedway	Park Place Motorsports	Saleen S7R	2nd		X
Grand-Am	Watkins Glen International	Park Place Motorsports	Saleen S7R	1st		
Grand-Am	Circuit Mont-Tremblant	TF Racing	Saleen S7R	3rd		
Spanish GT	Circuito de Albacete	Graham Nash	Saleen S7R	1st	X	
Spanish GT	Circuito de Albacete	Graham Nash	Saleen S7R	2nd		X
Spanish GT	Circuito del Jarama	Graham Nash	Saleen S7R	3rd		X
Spanish GT	Circuito del Jarama	Graham Nash	Saleen S7R	DNF	X	
Spanish GT	Autódromo do Estoril	Graham Nash	Saleen S7R	1st	X	X
Spanish GT	Circuit de Valencia	Graham Nash	Saleen S7R	2nd	X	X
Spanish GT	Circuito de Jerez	Graham Nash	Saleen S7R	1st	X	X
Spanish GT	Circuit de Barcelona-Catalunya	Graham Nash	Saleen S7R	2nd	X	
Spanish GT	Circuito de Albacete	Konrad Motorsport	Saleen S7R	2nd		
Spanish GT	Circuito de Albacete	Konrad Motorsport	Saleen S7R	DNF		
Manufacturers' Champion

2003	Series	Tracks	Teams	Podiums	Fastest Laps	Pole Positions
2003	5	20	3	1	7	4

2003 Season Details
Series	Track	Team	Chassis	Position	Fastest Lap	Pole Position
1000 km of Le Mans	Bugatti Circuit	Konrad Motorsport	Saleen S7R	4th		
24 Hours of Le Mans	Circuit de la Sarthe	Graham Nash	Saleen S7R	DNF		
24 Hours of Le Mans	Circuit de la Sarthe	Konrad Motorsport	Saleen S7R	DNF		
ALMS	Sebring	Graham Nash	Saleen S7R	DNF		
ALMS	Sebring	Konrad Motorsport	Saleen S7R	5th		
ALMS	Mosport	Konrad Motorsport	Saleen S7R	DNF		
ALMS	Road America	Konrad Motorsport	Saleen S7R	6th		
ALMS	Homestead	Konrad Motorsport	Saleen S7R	DNF		
FIA GT	Circuit de Barcelona-Catalunya	Graham Nash	Saleen S7R	9th		
FIA GT	Circuit de Barcelona-Catalunya	Graham Nash	Saleen S7R	DNF		
FIA GT	Circuit de Nevers Magny-Cours	Graham Nash	Saleen S7R	5th		
FIA GT	Autodromo di Pergusa	Graham Nash	Saleen S7R	7th		
FIA GT	Autodromo di Pergusa	Graham Nash	Saleen S7R	8th		X
FIA GT	Masaryk Circuit	Graham Nash	Saleen S7R	7th		
FIA GT	Masaryk Circuit	Graham Nash	Saleen S7R	DSQ		
FIA GT	Donington Park	Graham Nash	Saleen S7R	4th	X	
FIA GT	Circuit de Spa-Francorchamps	Graham Nash	Saleen S7R	5th		
FIA GT	Anderstorp Raceway	Graham Nash	Saleen S7R	DNF		
FIA GT	Motorsport Arena Oschersleben	Graham Nash	Saleen S7R	4th	X	
FIA GT	Motorsport Arena Oschersleben	Graham Nash	Saleen S7R	6th		
FIA GT	Autódromo do Estoril	Graham Nash	Saleen S7R	7th		
FIA GT	Autódromo do Estoril	Graham Nash	Saleen S7R	8th		
FIA GT	Autodromo Nazionale Monza	Graham Nash	Saleen S7R	10th	X	
FIA GT	Autodromo Nazionale Monza	Graham Nash	Saleen S7R	DNF		
FIA GT	Circuit de Barcelona-Catalunya	Konrad Motorsport	Saleen S7R	8th		
FIA GT	Circuit de Nevers Magny-Cours	Konrad Motorsport	Saleen S7R	DNF		
FIA GT	Autodromo di Pergusa	Konrad Motorsport	Saleen S7R	DNF		
FIA GT	Masaryk Circuit	Konrad Motorsport	Saleen S7R	9th	X	X
FIA GT	Donington Park	Konrad Motorsport	Saleen S7R	6th	X	
FIA GT	Circuit de Spa-Francorchamps	Konrad Motorsport	Saleen S7R	DNF		
FIA GT	Anderstorp Raceway	Konrad Motorsport	Saleen S7R	2nd	X	X
FIA GT	Motorsport Arena Oschersleben	Konrad Motorsport	Saleen S7R	DSQ		X
FIA GT	Autódromo do Estoril	Konrad Motorsport	Saleen S7R	4th		
FIA GT	Autodromo Nazionale Monza	Konrad Motorsport	Saleen S7R	11th	X	
Grand-Am	Daytona	Konrad Motorsport	Saleen S7R	5th		
Grand-Am	Watkins Glen	TF Racing	Saleen S7R	DNF		
Grand-Am	Circuit Mont-Tremblant	TF Racing	Saleen S7R	DNF		

2004	Series	Tracks	Teams	Podiums	Fastest Laps	Pole Positions
2004	7	30	7	25	16	9

2004 Season Details
Series	Track	Team	Chassis	Position	Fastest Lap	Pole Position
ALMS	Sebring	Acemco	Saleen S7R	3rd		
ALMS	Mid-Ohio	Acemco	Saleen S7R	3rd		
ALMS	Lime Rock	Acemco	Saleen S7R	3rd		
ALMS	Sears Point	Acemco	Saleen S7R	DSQ		
ALMS	Portland	Acemco	Saleen S7R	3rd		
ALMS	Portland	Acemco	Saleen S7R	3rd		
ALMS	Mosport	Acemco	Saleen S7R	3rd		
ALMS	Road America	Acemco	Saleen S7R	3rd		
ALMS	Petit Le Mans	Acemco	Saleen S7R	4th		
ALMS	Laguna Seca	Acemco	Saleen S7R	3rd		
FFSA	Circuit de Nevers Magny-Cours	DDO	Saleen S7R	1st		
FIA GT	Autodromo Nazionale Monza	Graham Nash	Saleen S7R	10th		
FIA GT	Circuit de Valencia	Graham Nash	Saleen S7R	12th		
FIA GT	Hockenheimring	Graham Nash	Saleen S7R	DNF		
FIA GT	Masaryk Circuit	Graham Nash	Saleen S7R	10th		
FIA GT	Donington Park	Graham Nash	Saleen S7R	13th		
FIA GT	Circuit de Spa-Francorchamps	Graham Nash	Saleen S7R	DNF		
FIA GT	Autodromo Enzo e Dino Ferrari	Graham Nash	Saleen S7R	12th		
FIA GT	Motorsport Arena Oschersleben	Graham Nash	Saleen S7R	11th		
FIA GT	Dubai Autodrome	Graham Nash	Saleen S7R	8th		
FIA GT	Zhuhai International Circuit	Graham Nash	Saleen S7R	DNF		
FIA GT	Autodromo Nazionale Monza	Konrad Motorsport	Saleen S7R	DNF		
FIA GT	Circuit de Valencia	Konrad Motorsport	Saleen S7R	11th		
FIA GT	Circuit de Nevers Magny-Cours	Konrad Motorsport	Saleen S7R	5th		X
FIA GT	Hockenheimring	Konrad Motorsport	Saleen S7R	DNF		X
FIA GT	Masaryk Circuit	Konrad Motorsport	Saleen S7R	6th		
FIA GT	Donington Park	Konrad Motorsport	Saleen S7R	11th		X
FIA GT	Circuit de Spa-Francorchamps	Konrad Motorsport	Saleen S7R	DNF		
FIA GT	Autodromo Enzo e Dino Ferrari	Konrad Motorsport	Saleen S7R	DNF		
FIA GT	Motorsport Arena Oschersleben	Konrad Motorsport	Saleen S7R	DNF		X
FIA GT	Dubai Autodrome	Konrad Motorsport	Saleen S7R	13th		
FIA GT	Zhuhai International Circuit	Konrad Motorsport	Saleen S7R	DNF		
FIA GT	Autodromo Nazionale Monza	RML Group	Saleen S7R	8th		
FIA GT	Autodromo Nazionale Monza	RML Group	Saleen S7R	9th		
FIA GT	Circuit de Valencia	RML Group	Saleen S7R	6th		
FIA GT	Circuit de Valencia	RML Group	Saleen S7R	10th		
FIA GT	Circuit de Nevers Magny-Cours	RML Group	Saleen S7R	10th		
FIA GT	Circuit de Nevers Magny-Cours	RML Group	Saleen S7R	DNF		
FIA GT	Hockenheimring	RML Group	Saleen S7R	8th		
FIA GT	Hockenheimring	RML Group	Saleen S7R	DNF		
FIA GT	Masaryk Circuit	RML Group	Saleen S7R	12th		
FIA GT	Masaryk Circuit	RML Group	Saleen S7R	13th		
FIA GT	Donington Park	RML Group	Saleen S7R	8th		
FIA GT	Donington Park	RML Group	Saleen S7R	9th		
FIA GT	Circuit de Spa-Francorchamps	RML Group	Saleen S7R	DNF		
FIA GT	Circuit de Spa-Francorchamps	RML Group	Saleen S7R	DNF		
FIA GT	Autodromo Enzo e Dino Ferrari	RML Group	Saleen S7R	10th		
FIA GT	Autodromo Enzo e Dino Ferrari	RML Group	Saleen S7R	DNF		
FIA GT	Motorsport Arena Oschersleben	RML Group	Saleen S7R	3rd	X	
FIA GT	Motorsport Arena Oschersleben	RML Group	Saleen S7R	7th		
FIA GT	Dubai Autodrome	RML Group	Saleen S7R	7th		
FIA GT	Dubai Autodrome	RML Group	Saleen S7R	DNF		
FIA GT	Zhuhai International Circuit	RML Group	Saleen S7R	7th		
FIA GT	Zhuhai International Circuit	RML Group	Saleen S7R	12th		
FIA GT	Autodromo Nazionale Monza	Vitaphone Racing	Saleen S7R	DNF	X	
FIA GT	Circuit de Valencia	Vitaphone Racing	Saleen S7R	DNF	X	X
FIA GT	Circuit de Nevers Magny-Cours	Vitaphone Racing	Saleen S7R	1st	X	
FIA GT	Hockenheimring	Vitaphone Racing	Saleen S7R	13th		
FIA GT	Masaryk Circuit	Vitaphone Racing	Saleen S7R	1st	X	
FIA GT	Donington Park	Vitaphone Racing	Saleen S7R	2nd	X	
FIA GT	Circuit de Spa-Francorchamps	Vitaphone Racing	Saleen S7R	DNF		
FIA GT	Autodromo Enzo e Dino Ferrari	Vitaphone Racing	Saleen S7R	1st	X	
FIA GT	Motorsport Arena Oschersleben	Vitaphone Racing	Saleen S7R	16th		
FIA GT	Dubai Autodrome	Vitaphone Racing	Saleen S7R	4th		
FIA GT	Zhuhai International Circuit	Vitaphone Racing	Saleen S7R	DNF		
French GT	Circuit Paul Armagnac	DDO	Saleen S7R	4th	X	
French GT	Circuit Paul Armagnac	DDO	Saleen S7R	5th		
French GT	Circuit de Lédenon	DDO	Saleen S7R	5th		
French GT	Circuit de Lédenon	DDO	Saleen S7R	7th	X	
French GT	Circuit du Val de Vienne	DDO	Saleen S7R	DNF		
French GT	Circuit du Val de Vienne	DDO	Saleen S7R	DNF		
French GT	Dijon-Prenois	DDO	Saleen S7R	2nd		
French GT	Dijon-Prenois	DDO	Saleen S7R	DNF		
French GT	Circuit d'Albi	DDO	Saleen S7R	1st		X
French GT	Circuit d'Albi	DDO	Saleen S7R	3rd	X	
French GT	Circuit de la Sarthe	DDO	Saleen S7R	7th		
French GT	Circuit de la Sarthe	DDO	Saleen S7R	DNF	X	
French GT	Circuit de Nevers Magny-Cours	DDO	Saleen S7R	1st	X	
French GT	Circuit de Nevers Magny-Cours	DDO	Saleen S7R	DNF		
Grand-Am	Auto Club Speedway	ACS Express Racing	Saleen S7R	DNF		
GT Festival	Bahrain International Circuit	DDO	Saleen S7R	1st		
GT Festival	Bahrain International Circuit	DDO	Saleen S7R	3rd		
GT Festival	Bahrain International Circuit	DDO	Saleen S7R	5th		X
LMES	Autodromo Nazionale Monza	Graham Nash	Saleen S7R	3rd	X	
LMES	Nürburgring	Graham Nash	Saleen S7R	3rd		
LMES	Silverstone Circuit	Graham Nash	Saleen S7R	3rd		
LMES	Circuit de Spa-Francorchamps	Graham Nash	Saleen S7R	4th	X	X
LMES	Circuit de Spa-Francorchamps	Graham Nash	Saleen S7R	5th		
LMES	Nürburgring	Konrad Motorsport	Saleen S7R	DNF		
LMES	Autodromo Nazionale Monza	Vitaphone Racing	Saleen S7R	DNF		
LMES	Nürburgring	Vitaphone Racing	Saleen S7R	2nd	X	X
LMES	Silverstone Circuit	Vitaphone Racing	Saleen S7R	DNF		
LMES	Circuit de Spa-Francorchamps	Vitaphone Racing	Saleen S7R	DNF		

2005	Series	Tracks	Teams	Podiums	Fastest Laps	Pole Positions
2005	8	30	7	12	3	5
Manufacturers' Champion

2005 Season Details
Series	Track	Team	Chassis	Position	Fastest Lap	Pole Position
ALMS	Sebring	Acemco	Saleen S7R	4th		
ALMS	Road Atlanta	Acemco	Saleen S7R	4th		
ALMS	Mid-Ohio	Acemco	Saleen S7R	3rd		
ALMS	Lime Rock	Acemco	Saleen S7R	3rd		
ALMS	Sears Point	Acemco	Saleen S7R	3rd		
ALMS	Portland	Acemco	Saleen S7R	DNF		
ALMS	Road America	Acemco	Saleen S7R	DNF		
ALMS	Mosport	Acemco	Saleen S7R	3rd		X
ALMS	Mosport	Acemco	Saleen S7R	3rd		
ALMS	Petit Le Mans	Acemco	Saleen S7R	3rd		
ALMS	Laguna Seca	Acemco	Saleen S7R	5th		X
ALMS	Laguna Seca	Acemco	Saleen S7R	5th		X
ALMS	Sebring	Graham Nash	Saleen S7R	DNF		
British GT	Circuit de Nevers Magny-Cours	Graham Nash	Saleen S7R	10th		
British GT	Circuit de Nevers Magny-Cours	Graham Nash	Saleen S7R	12th		
British GT	Circuit de Nevers Magny-Cours	Konrad Motorsport	Saleen S7R	11th		
British GT	Circuit de Nevers Magny-Cours	Konrad Motorsport	Saleen S7R	DNF		
British GT	Circuit de Nevers Magny-Cours	Ram Racing	Saleen S7R	DNF		
FIA GT	Autodromo Nazionale Monza	Graham Nash	Saleen S7R	8th		
FIA GT	Autodromo Nazionale Monza	Graham Nash	Saleen S7R	11th		
FIA GT	Circuit de Nevers Magny-Cours	Graham Nash	Saleen S7R	10th		
FIA GT	Circuit de Nevers Magny-Cours	Graham Nash	Saleen S7R	12th		
FIA GT	Silverstone Circuit	Graham Nash	Saleen S7R	9th		
FIA GT	Silverstone Circuit	Graham Nash	Saleen S7R	11th		
FIA GT	Autodromo Enzo e Dino Ferrari	Graham Nash	Saleen S7R	7th		
FIA GT	Autodromo Enzo e Dino Ferrari	Graham Nash	Saleen S7R	DNF		
FIA GT	Masaryk Circuit	Graham Nash	Saleen S7R	10th		
FIA GT	Circuit de Spa-Francorchamps	Graham Nash	Saleen S7R	7th		
FIA GT	Autodromo Nazionale Monza	Konrad Motorsport	Saleen S7R	12th		
FIA GT	Autodromo Nazionale Monza	Konrad Motorsport	Saleen S7R	DNF		
FIA GT	Circuit de Nevers Magny-Cours	Konrad Motorsport	Saleen S7R	11th		
FIA GT	Circuit de Nevers Magny-Cours	Konrad Motorsport	Saleen S7R	DNF		
FIA GT	Autodromo Enzo e Dino Ferrari	Konrad Motorsport	Saleen S7R	DNF		
FIA GT	Autodromo Enzo e Dino Ferrari	Konrad Motorsport	Saleen S7R	DNF		
FIA GT	Motorsport Arena Oschersleben	Konrad Motorsport	Saleen S7R	10th		
FIA GT	Motorsport Arena Oschersleben	Konrad Motorsport	Saleen S7R	4th		
FIA GT	Istanbul Racing Circuit	Konrad Motorsport	Saleen S7R	DNF		
FIA GT	Istanbul Racing Circuit	Konrad Motorsport	Saleen S7R	DNF		
FIA GT	Zhuhai International Circuit	Konrad Motorsport	Saleen S7R	DNF		
FIA GT	Zhuhai International Circuit	Konrad Motorsport	Saleen S7R	DNF		
FIA GT	Dubai Autodrome	Konrad Motorsport	Saleen S7R	DNF		
FIA GT	Dubai Autodrome	Konrad Motorsport	Saleen S7R	DNF		
FIA GT	Bahrain International Circuit	Konrad Motorsport	Saleen S7R	7th		
FIA GT	Bahrain International Circuit	Konrad Motorsport	Saleen S7R	11th		
FIA GT	Autodromo Nazionale Monza	Ram Racing	Saleen S7R	9th		
FIA GT	Circuit de Nevers Magny-Cours	Ram Racing	Saleen S7R	DNF		
FIA GT	Masaryk Circuit	Ram Racing	Saleen S7R	11th		
FIA GT	Motorsport Arena Oschersleben	Ram Racing	Saleen S7R	DNF		
French GT	Circuit Paul Armagnac	DDO	Saleen S7R	1st		
French GT	Pau Circuit	DDO	Saleen S7R	1st		
French GT	Circuit du Val de Vienne	DDO	Saleen S7R	1st		
French GT	Circuit de la Sarthe	DDO	Saleen S7R	2nd	X	X
French GT	Circuit de Nevers Magny-Cours	DDO	Saleen S7R	1st		
Italian GT	Misano World Circuit	Ettore Bonaldi	Saleen S7R	DNF		
Italian GT	Vallelunga Circuit	Ettore Bonaldi	Saleen S7R	6th		
Italian GT	Autodromo Nazionale Monza	Ettore Bonaldi	Saleen S7R	6th		
Italian GT	Hungaroring	Ettore Bonaldi	Saleen S7R	6th		
Italian GT	Autodromo di Magione	Ettore Bonaldi	Saleen S7R	DNF		
Italian GT	Mugello Circuit	Ettore Bonaldi	Saleen S7R	DNF		
Italian GT	Vallelunga Circuit	Ettore Bonaldi	Saleen S7R	DNF	X	
LMES	Circuit de Spa-Francorchamps	Graham Nash	Saleen S7R	4th		
LMES	Circuit de Spa-Francorchamps	Graham Nash	Saleen S7R	DNF		
LMES	Silverstone Circuit	Graham Nash	Saleen S7R	8th		
Mil Milhas Brasil	Interlagos	Konrad Motorsport	Saleen S7R	4th		
Winter Endurance Kampioenschap	Motorsport Arena Oschersleben	Zakspeed	Saleen S7R	1st	X	X

2006	Series	Tracks	Teams	Podiums	Fastest Laps	Pole Positions
2006	5	20	5	19	17	18
Manufacturers' Champion

2006 Season Details
Series	Track	Team	Chassis	Position	Fastest Lap	Pole Position
ALMS	Sebring	Konrad Motorsport	Saleen S7R	5th		
ALMS	Sebring	Konrad Motorsport	Saleen S7R	DNF		
British GT	Circuit de Nevers Magny-Cours	Oreca	Saleen S7R	1st	X	X
British GT	Circuit de Nevers Magny-Cours	Oreca	Saleen S7R	DNF		X
FFSA GT Championship	Circuit Paul Armagnac	Oreca	Saleen S7R	1st	X	X
FFSA GT Championship	Circuit Paul Armagnac	Oreca	Saleen S7R	1st	X	X
FFSA GT Championship	Circuit de Lédenon	Oreca	Saleen S7R	2nd		X
FFSA GT Championship	Circuit de Lédenon	Oreca	Saleen S7R	4th		
FFSA GT Championship	Dijon-Prenois	Oreca	Saleen S7R	1st	X	
FFSA GT Championship	Dijon-Prenois	Oreca	Saleen S7R	1st	X	X
FFSA GT Championship	Circuit du Val de Vienne	Oreca	Saleen S7R	1st		
FFSA GT Championship	Circuit du Val de Vienne	Oreca	Saleen S7R	12th		X
FFSA GT Championship	Circuit d'Albi	Oreca	Saleen S7R	2nd	X	X
FFSA GT Championship	Circuit d'Albi	Oreca	Saleen S7R	2nd	X	X
FFSA GT Championship	Circuit de la Sarthe	Oreca	Saleen S7R	1st	X	X
FFSA GT Championship	Circuit de la Sarthe	Oreca	Saleen S7R	1st		X
FFSA GT Championship	Circuit de Nevers Magny-Cours	Oreca	Saleen S7R	1st	X	X
FFSA GT Championship	Circuit de Nevers Magny-Cours	Oreca	Saleen S7R	DNF		
FFSA GT Championship	Circuit Paul Armagnac	Protek	Saleen S7R	3rd		
FFSA GT Championship	Circuit Paul Armagnac	Protek	Saleen S7R	17th		
FFSA GT Championship	Circuit de Lédenon	Protek	Saleen S7R	7th		
FFSA GT Championship	Circuit de Lédenon	Protek	Saleen S7R	9th		
FFSA GT Championship	Dijon-Prenois	Protek	Saleen S7R	7th		
FFSA GT Championship	Dijon-Prenois	Protek	Saleen S7R	DNF		
FFSA GT Championship	Circuit du Val de Vienne	Protek	Saleen S7R	2nd		
FFSA GT Championship	Circuit du Val de Vienne	Protek	Saleen S7R	4th		
FFSA GT Championship	Circuit d'Albi	Protek	Saleen S7R	4th		
FIA GT	Silverstone Circuit	Balfe Motorsport	Saleen S7R	9th		
FIA GT	Masaryk Circuit	Balfe Motorsport	Saleen S7R	DNF		
FIA GT	Motorsport Arena Oschersleben	Balfe Motorsport	Saleen S7R	8th		
FIA GT	Circuit Paul Ricard	Balfe Motorsport	Saleen S7R	DNF		
FIA GT	Dijon-Prenois	Balfe Motorsport	Saleen S7R	DNF		
FIA GT	Mugello Circuit	Balfe Motorsport	Saleen S7R	8th		
FIA GT	Hungaroring	Balfe Motorsport	Saleen S7R	9th		
FIA GT	Silverstone Circuit	Zakspeed	Saleen S7R	2nd	X	
FIA GT	Masaryk Circuit	Zakspeed	Saleen S7R	1st	X	X
FIA GT	Motorsport Arena Oschersleben	Zakspeed	Saleen S7R	4th		
FIA GT	Circuit de Spa-Francorchamps	Zakspeed	Saleen S7R	6th		
FIA GT	Circuit Paul Ricard	Zakspeed	Saleen S7R	8th		
FIA GT	Dijon-Prenois	Zakspeed	Saleen S7R	4th	X	X
FIA GT	Mugello Circuit	Zakspeed	Saleen S7R	4th	X	
FIA GT	Hungaroring	Zakspeed	Saleen S7R	1st		X
FIA GT	Adria International Raceway	Zakspeed	Saleen S7R	6th		X
FIA GT	Dubai Autodrome	Zakspeed	Saleen S7R	8th		
LMES	Circuit de Spa-Francorchamps	Oreca	Saleen S7R	1st	X	
LMES	Nürburgring	Oreca	Saleen S7R	4th	X	X
LMES	Donington Park	Oreca	Saleen S7R	DNF	X	
LMES	Circuito del Jarama	Oreca	Saleen S7R	1st	X	X

2007	Series	Tracks	Teams	Podiums	Fastest Laps	Pole Positions
2007	3	13	4	26	7	11
Manufacturers' Champion

2007 Season Details
Series	Track	Team	Chassis	Position	Fastest Lap	Pole Position
24 Hours of Le Mans	Circuit de la Sarthe	Oreca	Saleen S7R	5th		
24 Hours of Le Mans	Circuit de la Sarthe	Oreca	Saleen S7R	9th		
FFSA GT Championship	Circuit Paul Armagnac	Oreca	Saleen S7R	1st		X
FFSA GT Championship	Circuit Paul Armagnac	Oreca	Saleen S7R	3rd	X	
FFSA GT Championship	Circuit Paul Armagnac	Oreca	Saleen S7R	4th		
FFSA GT Championship	Circuit Paul Armagnac	Oreca	Saleen S7R	4th		
FFSA GT Championship	Circuit de Lédenon	Oreca	Saleen S7R	1st	X	
FFSA GT Championship	Circuit de Lédenon	Oreca	Saleen S7R	1st	X	
FFSA GT Championship	Circuit de Lédenon	Oreca	Saleen S7R	2nd		X
FFSA GT Championship	Circuit de Lédenon	Oreca	Saleen S7R	3rd		X
FFSA GT Championship	Dijon-Prenois	Oreca	Saleen S7R	1st		X
FFSA GT Championship	Dijon-Prenois	Oreca	Saleen S7R	1st		
FFSA GT Championship	Dijon-Prenois	Oreca	Saleen S7R	2nd	X	X
FFSA GT Championship	Dijon-Prenois	Oreca	Saleen S7R	5th		
FFSA GT Championship	Circuit du Val de Vienne	Oreca	Saleen S7R	1st		
FFSA GT Championship	Circuit du Val de Vienne	Oreca	Saleen S7R	1st		
FFSA GT Championship	Circuit du Val de Vienne	Oreca	Saleen S7R	3rd		X
FFSA GT Championship	Circuit du Val de Vienne	Oreca	Saleen S7R	10th		
FFSA GT Championship	Circuit d'Albi	Oreca	Saleen S7R	1st		X
FFSA GT Championship	Circuit d'Albi	Oreca	Saleen S7R	1st		
FFSA GT Championship	Circuit d'Albi	Oreca	Saleen S7R	2nd		
FFSA GT Championship	Circuit d'Albi	Oreca	Saleen S7R	4th		
FFSA GT Championship	Circuit Paul Armagnac	Oreca	Saleen S7R	1st		
FFSA GT Championship	Circuit Paul Armagnac	Oreca	Saleen S7R	2nd		X
FFSA GT Championship	Circuit Paul Armagnac	Oreca	Saleen S7R	5th		
FFSA GT Championship	Circuit Paul Armagnac	Oreca	Saleen S7R	6th		
FFSA GT Championship	Circuit de Nevers Magny-Cours	Oreca	Saleen S7R	2nd	X	
FFSA GT Championship	Circuit de Nevers Magny-Cours	Oreca	Saleen S7R	2nd		X
FFSA GT Championship	Circuit de Nevers Magny-Cours	Oreca	Saleen S7R	4th		
FFSA GT Championship	Circuit de Nevers Magny-Cours	Oreca	Saleen S7R	4th		
FFSA GT Championship	Circuit Paul Armagnac	Protek	Saleen S7R	5th		
FFSA GT Championship	Circuit Paul Armagnac	Protek	Saleen S7R	7th		
FFSA GT Championship	Circuit de Lédenon	Protek	Saleen S7R	7th		
FFSA GT Championship	Circuit de Lédenon	Protek	Saleen S7R	8th		
FFSA GT Championship	Dijon-Prenois	Protek	Saleen S7R	8th		
FFSA GT Championship	Dijon-Prenois	Protek	Saleen S7R	8th		
FFSA GT Championship	Circuit du Val de Vienne	Protek	Saleen S7R	DNF		
FFSA GT Championship	Circuit du Val de Vienne	Protek	Saleen S7R	DNF		
FFSA GT Championship	Circuit d'Albi	Protek	Saleen S7R	5th		
FFSA GT Championship	Circuit d'Albi	Protek	Saleen S7R	6th		
FFSA GT Championship	Circuit Paul Armagnac	Tarres	Saleen S7R	8th		
FFSA GT Championship	Circuit Paul Armagnac	Tarres	Saleen S7R	28th		
FFSA GT Championship	Circuit de Lédenon	Tarres	Saleen S7R	6th		
FFSA GT Championship	Circuit de Lédenon	Tarres	Saleen S7R	9th		
FFSA GT Championship	Dijon-Prenois	Tarres	Saleen S7R	4th		
FFSA GT Championship	Dijon-Prenois	Tarres	Saleen S7R	24th		
FFSA GT Championship	Circuit du Val de Vienne	Tarres	Saleen S7R	4th	X	X
FFSA GT Championship	Circuit du Val de Vienne	Tarres	Saleen S7R	6th		
FFSA GT Championship	Circuit d'Albi	Tarres	Saleen S7R	3rd		
FFSA GT Championship	Circuit d'Albi	Tarres	Saleen S7R	DNF		X
FFSA GT Championship	Circuit Paul Armagnac	Tarres	Saleen S7R	2nd	X	
FFSA GT Championship	Circuit Paul Armagnac	Tarres	Saleen S7R	5th		
FFSA GT Championship	Circuit de Nevers Magny-Cours	Tarres	Saleen S7R	6th		
FFSA GT Championship	Circuit de Nevers Magny-Cours	Tarres	Saleen S7R	7th		
FFSA GT Championship	Circuit de Nevers Magny-Cours	Tarres	Saleen S7R	DNF		
FFSA GT Championship	Circuit de Nevers Magny-Cours	Tarres	Saleen S7R	DNF		
LMES	Autodromo Nazionale Monza	Oreca	Saleen S7R	DNF		
LMES	Circuit de Valencia	Oreca	Saleen S7R	1st		
LMES	Nürburgring	Oreca	Saleen S7R	1st		
LMES	Circuit de Spa-Francorchamps	Oreca	Saleen S7R	1st		
LMES	Silverstone Circuit	Oreca	Saleen S7R	1st		
LMES	Autodromo Nazionale Monza	Racing Box	Saleen S7R	5th		
LMES	Circuit de Valencia	Racing Box	Saleen S7R	2nd		
LMES	Nürburgring	Racing Box	Saleen S7R	5th		
LMES	Circuit de Spa-Francorchamps	Racing Box	Saleen S7R	DNF		
LMES	Silverstone Circuit	Racing Box	Saleen S7R	6th		

2008	Series	Tracks	Teams	Podiums	Fastest Laps	Pole Positions
2008	4	17	7	24	4	6
Manufacturers' Champion

2008 Season Details
Series	Track	Team	Chassis	Position	Fastest Lap	Pole Position
24 Hours of Le Mans	Circuit de la Sarthe	Larbre	Saleen S7R	7th		
FFSA GT Championship	Circuit Paul Armagnac	Larbre	Saleen S7R	1st		
FFSA GT Championship	Circuit Paul Armagnac	Larbre	Saleen S7R	2nd		
FFSA GT Championship	Circuit Paul Armagnac	Larbre	Saleen S7R	5th		
FFSA GT Championship	Circuit Paul Armagnac	Larbre	Saleen S7R	27th		
FFSA GT Championship	Circuit de Lédenon	Larbre	Saleen S7R	1st		X
FFSA GT Championship	Circuit de Lédenon	Larbre	Saleen S7R	2nd		
FFSA GT Championship	Circuit de Lédenon	Larbre	Saleen S7R	3rd		X
FFSA GT Championship	Circuit de Lédenon	Larbre	Saleen S7R	5th		
FFSA GT Championship	Dijon-Prenois	Larbre	Saleen S7R	1st		X
FFSA GT Championship	Dijon-Prenois	Larbre	Saleen S7R	2nd		
FFSA GT Championship	Dijon-Prenois	Larbre	Saleen S7R	3rd		
FFSA GT Championship	Dijon-Prenois	Larbre	Saleen S7R	6th		
FFSA GT Championship	Dijon-Prenois	Larbre	Saleen S7R	DNF		
FFSA GT Championship	Circuit du Val de Vienne	Larbre	Saleen S7R	1st		
FFSA GT Championship	Circuit du Val de Vienne	Larbre	Saleen S7R	2nd		
FFSA GT Championship	Circuit du Val de Vienne	Larbre	Saleen S7R	4th		
FFSA GT Championship	Circuit du Val de Vienne	Larbre	Saleen S7R	8th		
FFSA GT Championship	Circuit de Spa-Francorchamps	Larbre	Saleen S7R	1st		
FFSA GT Championship	Circuit de Spa-Francorchamps	Larbre	Saleen S7R	2nd	X	
FFSA GT Championship	Circuit de Spa-Francorchamps	Larbre	Saleen S7R	3rd		
FFSA GT Championship	Circuit de Spa-Francorchamps	Larbre	Saleen S7R	DNF		

2009	Series	Tracks	Teams	Podiums	Fastest Laps	Pole Positions
2009	4	16	5	19	4	6

2009 Season Details
Series	Track	Team	Chassis	Position	Fastest Lap	Pole Position
Asian Le Mans Series	Okayama International Circuit	Larbre	Saleen S7R	3rd		
Asian Le Mans Series	Okayama International Circuit	Larbre	Saleen S7R	DNF		
FFSA GT Championship	Circuit Paul Armagnac	Larbre	Saleen S7R	1st		
FFSA GT Championship	Circuit Paul Armagnac	Larbre	Saleen S7R	5th		
FFSA GT Championship	Circuit Paul Armagnac	Larbre	Saleen S7R	20th		
FFSA GT Championship	Dijon-Prenois	Larbre	Saleen S7R	1st	X	
FFSA GT Championship	Dijon-Prenois	Larbre	Saleen S7R	3rd		
FFSA GT Championship	Circuit de Nevers Magny-Cours	Larbre	Saleen S7R	3rd		
FFSA GT Championship	Circuit de Nevers Magny-Cours	Larbre	Saleen S7R	DNF		
FFSA GT Championship	Circuit du Val de Vienne	Larbre	Saleen S7R	1st	X	X
FFSA GT Championship	Circuit du Val de Vienne	Larbre	Saleen S7R	5th		X
FFSA GT Championship	Circuit d'Albi	Larbre	Saleen S7R	1st	X	
FFSA GT Championship	Circuit d'Albi	Larbre	Saleen S7R	2nd		
FFSA GT Championship	Circuit Paul Ricard	Larbre	Saleen S7R	1st		
FFSA GT Championship	Circuit Paul Ricard	Larbre	Saleen S7R	4th		
FFSA GT Championship	Circuit de Lédenon	Larbre	Saleen S7R	1st		
FFSA GT Championship	Circuit de Lédenon	Larbre	Saleen S7R	2nd		
FFSA GT Championship	Circuit de Lédenon	Larbre	Saleen S7R	3rd		
FFSA GT Championship	Circuit de Lédenon	Larbre	Saleen S7R	5th		
FFSA GT Championship	Circuit Paul Armagnac	Tarres	Saleen S7R	6th		
FFSA GT Championship	Circuit Paul Armagnac	Tarres	Saleen S7R	6th		
FFSA GT Championship	Dijon-Prenois	Tarres	Saleen S7R	5th		
FFSA GT Championship	Dijon-Prenois	Tarres	Saleen S7R	6th		
FFSA GT Championship	Circuit de Nevers Magny-Cours	Tarres	Saleen S7R	5th		
FFSA GT Championship	Circuit de Nevers Magny-Cours	Tarres	Saleen S7R	5th		
FFSA GT Championship	Circuit du Val de Vienne	Tarres	Saleen S7R	4th		
FFSA GT Championship	Circuit du Val de Vienne	Tarres	Saleen S7R	4th		
FFSA GT Championship	Circuit d'Albi	Tarres	Saleen S7R	4th		
FFSA GT Championship	Circuit d'Albi	Tarres	Saleen S7R	5th		
FFSA GT Championship	Circuit Paul Ricard	Tarres	Saleen S7R	5th		
FFSA GT Championship	Circuit Paul Ricard	Tarres	Saleen S7R	5th		
FFSA GT Championship	Circuit de Lédenon	Tarres	Saleen S7R	7th		
FFSA GT Championship	Circuit de Lédenon	Tarres	Saleen S7R	7th		
FIA GT	Hungaroring	ARC Bratislava	Saleen S7R	1st		
FIA GT	Silverstone Circuit	Full Speed Racing	Saleen S7R	9th		
FIA GT	Silverstone Circuit	Full Speed Racing	Saleen S7R	DNF		
FIA GT	Adria International Raceway	Full Speed Racing	Saleen S7R	6th		
FIA GT	Adria International Raceway	Full Speed Racing	Saleen S7R	DNF		
FIA GT	Motorsport Arena Oschersleben	Full Speed Racing	Saleen S7R	8th		
FIA GT	Motorsport Arena Oschersleben	Full Speed Racing	Saleen S7R	DNF		
FIA GT	Circuit de Spa-Francorchamps	Full Speed Racing	Saleen S7R	DNF		
FIA GT	Hungaroring	Full Speed Racing	Saleen S7R	DNF		
FIA GT	Autódromo Internacional do Algarve	Full Speed Racing	Saleen S7R	DNF		
FIA GT	Silverstone Circuit	K Plus K	Saleen S7R	1st	X	X
FIA GT	Silverstone Circuit	K Plus K	Saleen S7R	5th		
FIA GT	Adria International Raceway	K Plus K	Saleen S7R	17th		
FIA GT	Adria International Raceway	K Plus K	Saleen S7R	DNF		X
FIA GT	Motorsport Arena Oschersleben	Full Speed Racing	Saleen S7R	14th		
FIA GT	Motorsport Arena Oschersleben	K Plus K	Saleen S7R	DNF		
FIA GT	Hungaroring	K Plus K	Saleen S7R	1st		
FIA GT	Hungaroring	K Plus K	Saleen S7R	DNF		
LMES	Circuit de Catalunya	Larbre	Saleen S7R	3rd		
LMES	Autódromo Internacional do Algarve	Larbre	Saleen S7R	2nd		
LMES	Nürburgring	Larbre	Saleen S7R	1st		X
LMES	Silverstone Circuit	Larbre	Saleen S7R	2nd		X

==== 2010s ====
2010	Series	Tracks	Teams	Podiums	Fastest Laps	Pole Positions
2010	4	7	2	9	0	4
Manufacturers' Champion

2010 Season Details
Series	Track	Team	Chassis	Position	Fastest Lap	Pole Position
24 Hours of Le Mans	Circuit de la Sarthe	Larbre	Saleen S7R	1st		
ILMC	Silverstone Circuit	Larbre	Saleen S7R	1st		X
ILMC	Zhuhai International Circuit	Larbre	Saleen S7R	1st		
LMES	Circuit de Spa-Francorchamps	Atlas	Saleen S7R	6th		
LMES	Autódromo Internacional do Algarve	Atlas	Saleen S7R	2nd		
LMES	Hungaroring	Atlas	Saleen S7R	DNF		
LMES	Circuit Paul Ricard	Larbre	Saleen S7R	1st		X
LMES	Circuit de Spa-Francorchamps	Larbre	Saleen S7R	4th		
LMES	Autódromo Internacional do Algarve	Larbre	Saleen S7R	1st		
LMES	Hungaroring	Larbre	Saleen S7R	1st		X
LMES	Silverstone Circuit	Larbre	Saleen S7R	1st		X

== OEM Development ==
In 2002, Saleen was awarded the partial assembly and paint contract for the 2004–2006 Ford GT.

Beginning with the 2007 model year, the Saleen-designed 450 hp (340 kW) supercharger kit in the F-150-based S331 was offered by Ford as a ship-through Ford-endorsed performance option on Harley Davidson Edition F150s. At the 2007 New York International Auto Show, Chip Foose unveiled a Ford-endorsed limited edition F150, powered by the Saleen-designed powertrain used on the Saleen S331SC.
