= Saleen S1 =

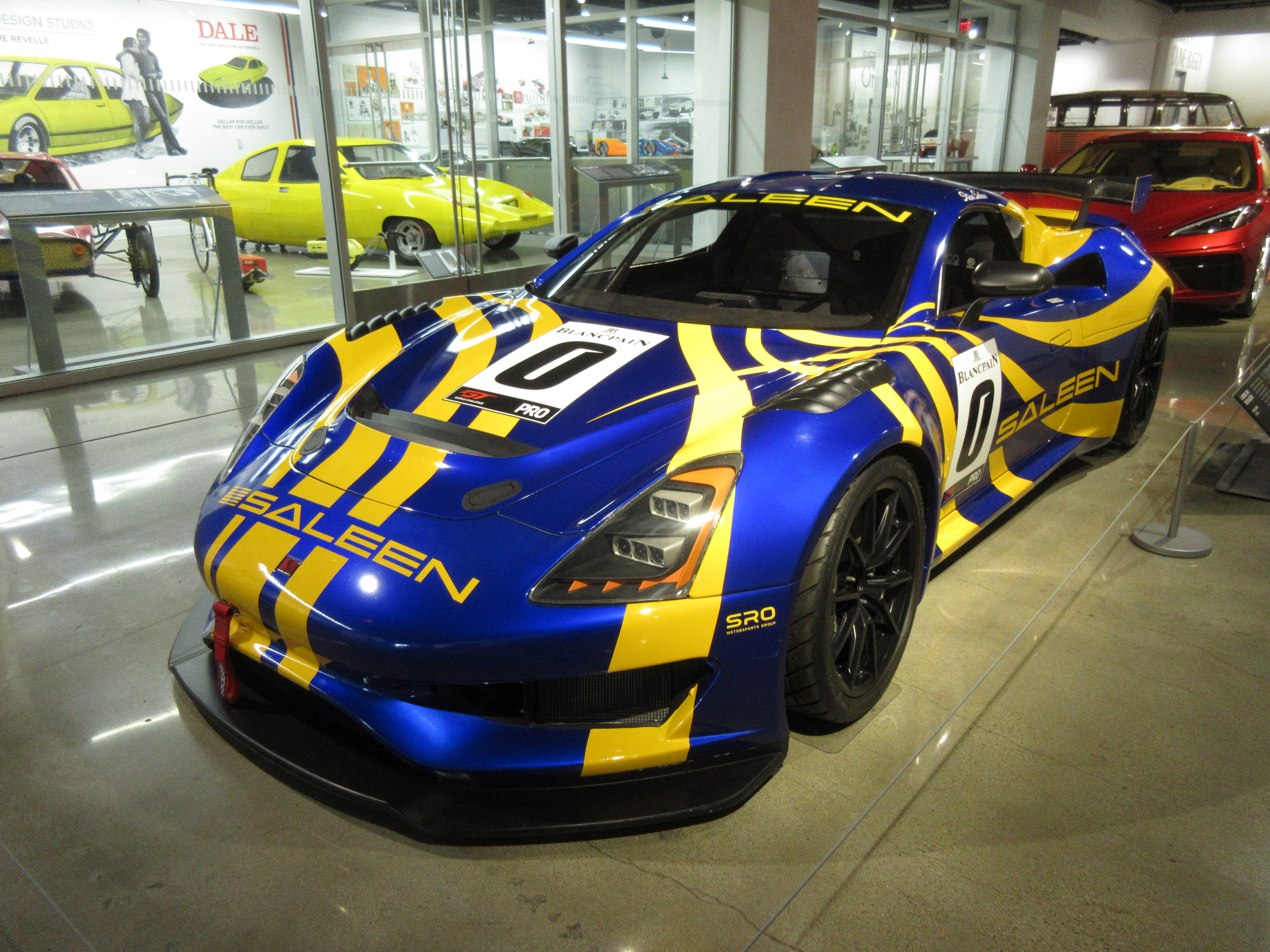

Overview
- Manufacturer: Saleen
- Also called: Saleen 1
- Production: 2018 (1,500 units)
- Model years: 2019
- Assembly: China: Jiangsu
- Designer: Steve Saleen

Body and chassis
- Class: Sports car (S)
- Body style: 2-door coupé
- Layout: Rear mid-engine, rear-wheel-drive
- Related: Artega GT

Powertrain
- Engine: 2.5 L Saleen/GM Ecotec turbocharged I4, 336 kW (457 PS; 451 hp)
- Transmission: 6-speed manual

Dimensions
- Wheelbase: 97.5 in (2,476 mm)
- Length: 171.5 in (4,356 mm)
- Width: 76.3 in (1,938 mm)
- Height: 46.9 in (1,191 mm)
- Curb weight: 2,685 lb (1,218 kg)

The Saleen S1 is a two-seater sports car developed and built by American automobile manufacturer Saleen Automotive. It was unveiled at the 2017 LA Auto Show, and is the first car developed entirely by Saleen since the Saleen S7 ended production in 2009. Production of the S1 was planned to be 1,500 units yearly, with a starting price of US$100,000 each. These plans did not materialize.

== Specifications ==
=== Powertrain ===
Rear view

The S1 is powered by a proprietary 2.5 litre turbocharged inline-four engine developed by Saleen (based on the GM LKW Ecotec3 engine, it has a cast aluminum cylinder block with cast-in iron liners and uses a forged steel crankshaft), with an 88.0 mm (3.46 in) bore and 100.8 mm (3.97 in) stroke, and rated at 450 hp (336 kW) and 350 lb⋅ft (475 N⋅m) of torque. The engine is mid-rear, transversely mounted and drives the rear wheels.

=== Transmission ===
The S1 is equipped with a 6-speed manual transmission as standard, however a paddle shift automatic transmission is expected to be offered as an option.

=== Suspension ===
The S1 uses double wishbone suspension on the front and rear axles of the vehicle, allowing for easier tuning of suspension kinematics and properties such as camber angle or toe.

=== Wheels ===
The car is equipped with alloy wheels with diameters of 20 inches at the front and rear. The Continental tires have codes of 255/30 ZR 20 for the front and 335/25 ZR 20 for the rear. The brake calipers and rotors measure 15 inches in diameter at the front and the rear.

=== Interior features ===
The interior of the S1 is finished mostly in leather, suede, and Alcantara. Other amenities include Sirius radio, Apple CarPlay, and a six-speaker sound system.

== Performance ==
The manufacturer claims a top speed of 180 mph (290 km/h) for the S1. The car has claimed acceleration times of 3.5 seconds for 0–60 mph (0–97 km/h) and 11.3 seconds for the quarter mile. These acceleration times are achieved through a power-to-weight ratio of 0.17 hp/lb (0.28 kW/kg). The S1 is also capable of 1.2g of lateral acceleration in a turn.

== Racing ==
=== Saleen Cup ===
The Saleen Cup was launched in partnership with SRO Motorsports Group in 2019 to demonstrate the capabilities of the S1. A modified version of the S1, called the Saleen Cup car, is the exclusive car raced in the series. The Cup car features race-spec aerodynamics, FIA standard safety equipment, and slick racing tires. The Saleen Cup series consists of eight races at four tracks around the United States, listed below:

Date	Racetrack	Location	Winner
July 12–14, 2019	Portland International Raceway	Portland, Oregon	(United States) Brandon Davis (United States) Paul Terry
Aug. 30–Sept. 1 2019	Watkins Glen International	Watkins Glen, New York	T.B.D.
Sept. 20–Sept. 22 2019	Road America	Elkhart Lake, Wisconsin	T.B.D.
Oct. 18–Oct. 20 2019	Las Vegas Motor Speedway	Las Vegas, Nevada	T.B.D.

The 2020 Saleen Cup was cancelled the weekend before its scheduled opening event.

=== GT4 ===
Saleen plans to further modify the S1 Cup car for GT4 homologation for the 2020 season. Saleen's plan includes the introduction of a factory racing team, with at least one driver sourced from the winners of the summer 2019 Saleen Cup.
