= Saleen 302 Series =

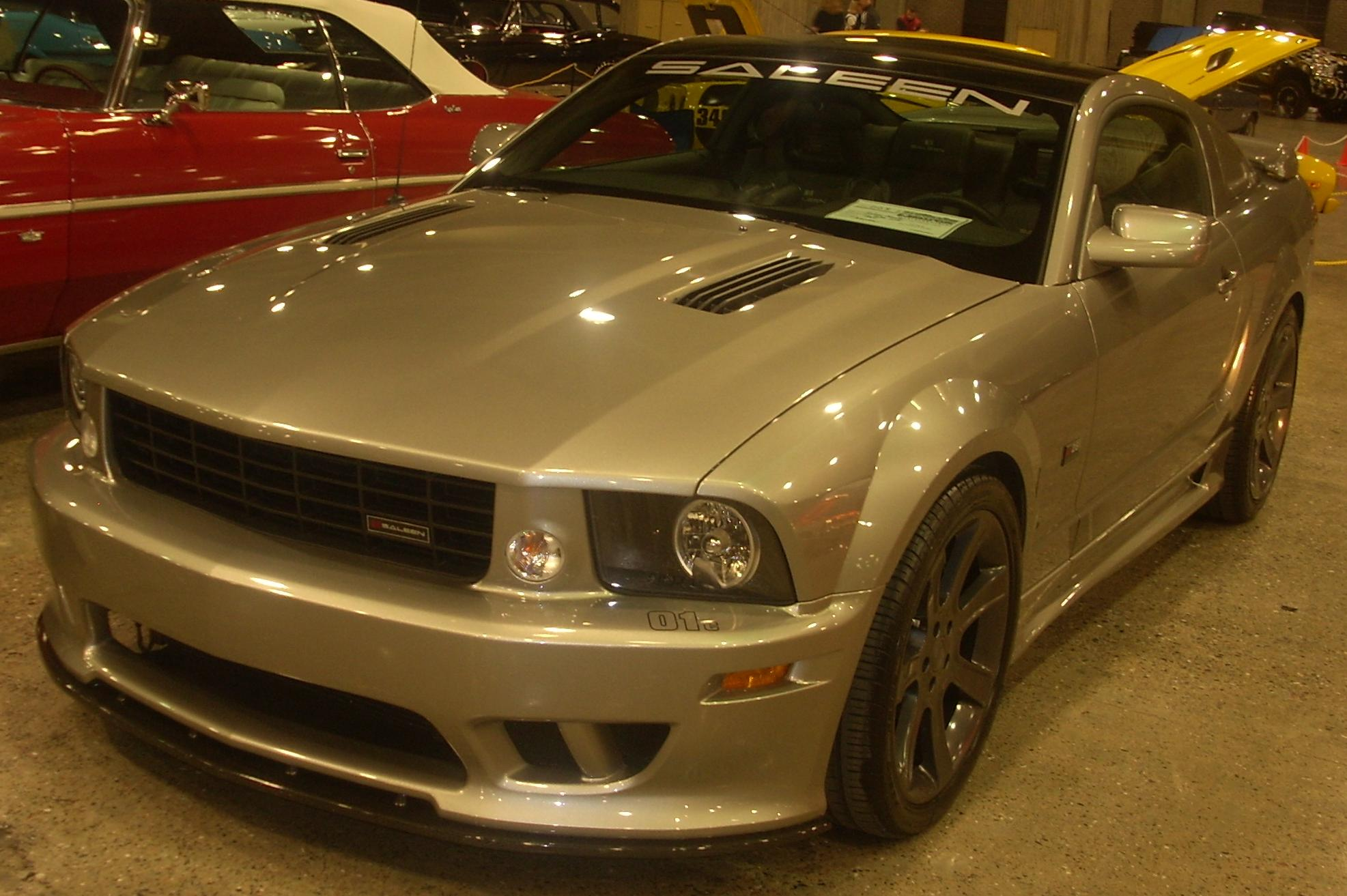

Overview
- Manufacturer: Saleen
- Production: 2007-2009
- Assembly: Troy, Michigan

Body and chassis
- Class: Sports car
- Body style: 2-door coupe 2-door convertible
- Layout: FR layout
- Related: Ford Mustang

Powertrain
- Engine: 5.0 L Modular V8, 390 hp (291 kW) to 620 hp (462 kW)
- Transmission: 5 or 6-Speed manual

Dimensions
- Wheelbase: 107.1 in (2,720 mm)
- Length: 189 in (4,801 mm)
- Width: 74 in (1,880 mm)
- Height: 56 in (1,422 mm)
- Curb weight: 3,550 lb (1,610 kg)

Chronology
- Predecessor: Saleen Mustang
- Successor: SMS 302/SMS 302X (2011)

The Saleen 302 Series are variations introduced in the 5th generation of Ford Mustang which was produced by the American manufacturer Saleen, Inc. Beginning in 2007 with the S302-PJ edition, Saleen modified stock Ford 4.6L 3V V8 engine blocks with a larger displacement and high compression to 5.0L with OEM engine components.

Previously referred to as Saleen Mustang, Saleen now introduced a model designation based on the Cubic Inch Displacement (CID) of the engine, now referring the car as Saleen 302 CID, or simply S302. Any distinguishable options purchased by the customer is indicated with a suffix added after the 302, designating its difference.

== Variants ==
From its first introduction in 2007 until 2009, the 302 Series have been introduced in several limited edition models:

- S302-PJ: Limited Edition Parnelli Jones Model
- H302-3V: Naturally Aspirated 3-Valve Heritage Model
- H302-DH: Limited Edition Dark Horse Heritage Model with SpeedLab SuperShaker
- H302-SC: Supercharged Heritage Model
- S302-E: Supercharged Extreme Model
- S302-ST/SA-25: 25th Anniversary Sterling Edition Model (2008)

=== S302-PJ ===
Making its debut for the 302 Series, the Ford Saleen 302 CID Parnelli Jones was a limited run of 500 vehicles commemorating Parnelli Jones’ 1970 SCCA Ford Mustang Boss 302. Utilizing a unique Watts Link suspension as well as a Shaker Hood Scoop, the S302-PJ’s performance is rated at 400 hp (298 kW).

=== H302-3V ===
Released alongside the H281 Series, the Heritage 302 CID 3-Valve shares similar bodywork arrangements and decals with the H281, but now uses a 302 CID 3-Valve engine rated at 390 hp (291 kW). The H302-3V also uses Shaker Hood Scoop found on the S302-PJ but does not have any chrome trim accents. The H302-3V is available in all OEM Ford colors except Grabber Orange.

=== H302-DH ===
Introduced only in 2009, the Heritage 302 CID Dark Horse was a limited run of 30 vehicles. Using the Saleen Series VI Supercharger found in the S302-E, the H302-DH has an equivalent horsepower rating of 620 hp (462 kW) as the S302-E, but lacks the CNC Ported aluminum piston heads. Another interesting feature is the use of a SuperShaker scoop attached to the Series IV Supercharger which integrates the scoop and the supercharger together.

=== H302-SC ===
The Heritage 302 CID Supercharged version of the H302-3V now utilizes a Saleen forced-induction system as well as a twin-screw intercooled supercharger to boost horsepower performance at 580 (430 kW). Borrowing only the Watts Link from the S302-PJ, the H302-SC does not use the Shaker Hood Scoop from the S302-PJ due to the Supercharger being in place of the scoop.

=== S302-E ===
Replacing the S281-E in 2008, the Saleen 302 CID Extreme borrows the engine found on the S302-PJ but now with a Saleen Series VI Supercharger and 5-Axis CNC Ported aluminum piston heads, boosting the horsepower rating to 620 hp (462 kW).

=== S302-ST (SA-25) ===
To celebrate 25 Years of Saleen, 25 specially customized S302’s were built with the latest technology Saleen had to offer at the time. The Saleen 302 CID STerlng Edition, also known as the Saleen Anniversary of 25 Years brought the return of only being offered as a Coupe since the introduction of the SA-10 in 1993 as well as being the only Anniversary model to not have Black, White, or Yellow paint/graphics applied. Borrowing heavily from the S302-E, the S302-SI uses a Saleen Series VI Supercharger to increase the horsepower rating now at 620 hp (462 kW) with a customized unique interior.

== See also ==
- Ford Mustang
- Shelby Mustang
