= Yang Rong (businessman) =

Chinese automobile tycoon (born 1957)

- 仰融
- Born: 1957 (age 68–69); Anhui, China
- Other names: Yung Yeung and Benjamin Yeung
- Education: Southwestern University of Finance and Economics
- Occupation: Businessman
- Known for: Founder and chairman of Brilliance Auto Group; Founder of Hybrid Kinetic Motors, and litigation for control of the company with Charlie Wang

Yang Rong
- Chinese: 仰融
Transcriptions
Standard Mandarin
- Hanyu Pinyin: Yǎng Róng
Yue: Cantonese
- Jyutping: joeng5 jung4

Yang Rong (Chinese: 仰融; born 1957), also known as Yung Yeung and Benjamin Yeung, is a Chinese businessman who has lived in exile in the United States since 2001. Born in Anhui, Yang is the founder of the Liaoning-based Brilliance Auto Group, which became the first Chinese company listed on the New York Stock Exchange in 1992. In 2001, Forbes ranked him as China's third-richest businessman. In 2002, amid disputes with Liaoning authorities under Governor Bo Xilai, Yang fled to the US with the assistance of Clark T. Randt Jr., then U.S. ambassador to China and former legal counsel for Brilliance's U.S. listing. Yang pursued further automotive ventures, but none matched his earlier success.

== Early life ==
Yang was born in Anhui province, China. He joined the Chinese army when he was a teenager. In the early 1980s, he earned a doctorate in economics at the Southwestern University of Finance and Economics in Sichuan province.

== Career ==
=== Brilliance Auto ===
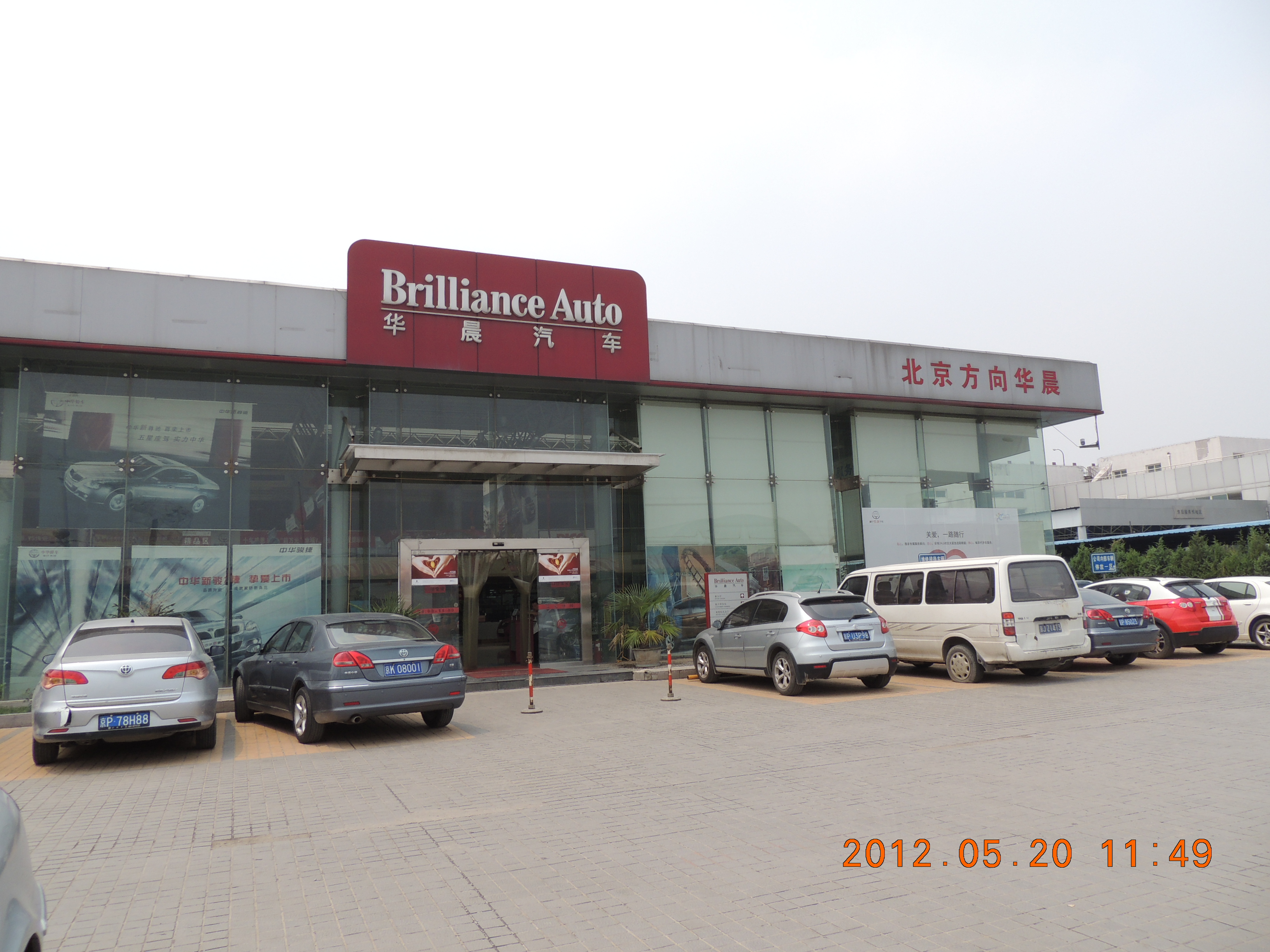
Brilliance Auto dealership in Beijing, China

Yang was the founding chairman of the Chinese auto manufacturer Brilliance Auto, and was involved with the company from the 1990s through 2002. Brilliance rose under him to become China's largest automaker.

While Yang was in control, Brilliance Auto issued a number of IPOs. These included listing a subsidiary Brilliance Auto on the New York Stock Exchange in 1992, the same subsidiary again on the Stock Exchange of Hong Kong (SEHK) in 1999, and that same year a takeover of another listed company Shenhua Holdings on the Shanghai Stock Exchange. In the early 2000s, Brilliance became the biggest maker of minivans in China. In 2001, Forbes reported that Yang was China's third-richest businessman.

Yang made a failed bid to build a Brilliance factory in Ningbo, a city near Shanghai, despite then governor of Liaoning, Bo Xilai, demanded Yang locate the factory in Liaoning. In 2002, the Liaoning government seized Yang's stake of $700 million in Brilliance, and accused Yang of embezzlement, leading to an arrest warrant against him. Yang subsequently fled China in July 2002, and has been living in exile in the United States since.

=== GreenTech Automotive ===
GreenTech Automotive planned to build all-electric vehicles in Mississippi. Yang has distanced himself from Greentech Automotive.

=== Hybrid Kinetic Motors ===
After leaving China in July 2002, Yang began a start-up car company in the United States, Hybrid Kinetic Motors Corporation (SEHK: 1188). While its desire to manufacture in the US did not come to fruition, in the early 2010s the company expressed interest in several Mainland China production base sites. In 2013 it broke ground for a new facility in the Lianyungang Economic and Technological Development Zone, Lianyungang prefecture, which it was reported might produce batteries and become operational in 2018.

2008–09 Mississippi factory plan; litigation for control of the company

In 2008, lawyer Xiaolin "Charles" Wang (also known as Charlie Wang) was a front man for Yeung, working on a proposed $6.5 billion plant. The plant was pitched as being able to create jobs for up to 25,000 people in north Mississippi. The company planned to raise money from foreign investors through a U.S. program that provides foreign investors with a chance to obtain a visa by investing in a company in the United States.

However, Yeung and Wang argued in late 2008 over control of the company. Yeung cut ties with Wang, and a lawsuit between the two was filed in Mississippi in early 2009 with each accusing the other of dubious business practices. Charles Huang, vice chairman of HK Motors, said: "Charlie Wang was a senior executive, an employee of Chairman Yeung's company. He was simply not possible to be qualified as Yeung's business partner as he does not have the capital, business experiences, or managerial experience."

U.S. federal chief judge Michael P. Mills wrote in an opinion on the dispute that Wang had taken actions of "dubious legality" in issuing stock in connection with Hybrid Kinetic Motors. GreenTech was born out of the dispute. The judge noted that the company website described Wang as "a graduate of Duke Law School" who had formerly served as a "partner and the head of Asia practice for a prominent New York law firm" and who had, prior to that, held a similar position with a "prestigious Washington law firm," but the judge went on to comment that "While prominence and prestige are laudable attributes in today's society, the older virtues of common honesty and integrity sometimes still carry the day." The lawsuit was settled out of court with $1.5 million being paid to Yang, who also retained the name "Hybrid Kinetic," as Wang began anew using the "GreenTech" name.

Plans for the Mississippi auto factory fell through c. 2009.

2009 Alabama factory plan

As of September 2009 the possibility of producing Hybrid Kinetic vehicles at an undeveloped site near Bay Minette in Baldwin County, Alabama, was discussed. Hybrid Kinetic later dropped its Alabama plan due to a funding shortfall in 2009.

JAC joint venture

In 2010, Hybrid Kinetic signed a letter of intent to enter into a joint venture with Chinese vehicle manufacturer Jianghuai Automobile, selling parts in China for use in green technology vehicles. A Tianjin, Shandong province, production base was to be complete by 2013. While the original intent was to manufacture whole vehicles, the JV was only to supply parts.

2017 Collaboration with Pininfarina

A collaboration agreement was entered into by Hybrid Kinetic totaling $68 million with the Italian Pininfarina design firm for 46 months. According to this agreement, "Pininfarina will support Hybrid Kinetic in the turnkey development of an electric car from the styling concept and development of the vehicle to the engineering development and virtual and physical validation for series production". During this development, some of the vehicles in development included the following: H600 4 Seater Sedan, K550 5 Seater SUV, K750 7 Seater SUV, HK GT 4 Seater GT, K350 4 Seater Sedan, and H500 4 Seater Sedan.
