= 1997 FIA GT Nürburgring 4 Hours =

Nürburgring (1995-2001)

The 1997 FIA GT Nürburgring 4 Hours was the fourth automobile endurance motor race for LMGT cars of the 1997 FIA GT Championship. It was run at the Nürburgring, Germany on June 29, 1997.

== Official results ==
Class winners in bold. Cars failing to complete 75% of winner's distance marked as Not Classified (NC).

Pos	Class	No	Team	Drivers	Chassis	Tyre	Laps
Pos	Class	No	Team	Drivers	Engine	Tyre	Laps
1	**GT1**	**11**	**(Germany) AMG-Mercedes**	**(Germany) Bernd Schneider (Germany) Klaus Ludwig**	**Mercedes-Benz CLK GTR**	**B**	**147**
1	**GT1**	**11**	**(Germany) AMG-Mercedes**	**(Germany) Bernd Schneider (Germany) Klaus Ludwig**	**Mercedes-Benz LS600 6.0L V12**	**B**	**147**
2	GT1	10	(Germany) AMG-Mercedes	(Germany) Marcel Tiemann (Italy) Alessandro Nannini	Mercedes-Benz CLK GTR	**B**	147
2	GT1	10	(Germany) AMG-Mercedes	(Germany) Marcel Tiemann (Italy) Alessandro Nannini	Mercedes-Benz LS600 6.0L V12	**B**	147
3	GT1	8	(Germany) BMW Motorsport (Germany) Schnitzer Motorsport	(Finland) JJ Lehto (United Kingdom) Steve Soper	McLaren F1 GTR	**MI**	146
3	GT1	8	(Germany) BMW Motorsport (Germany) Schnitzer Motorsport	(Finland) JJ Lehto (United Kingdom) Steve Soper	BMW S70 6.0L V12	**MI**	146
4	GT1	9	(Germany) BMW Motorsport (Germany) Schnitzer Motorsport	(Netherlands) Peter Kox (Italy) Roberto Ravaglia	McLaren F1 GTR	**MI**	146
4	GT1	9	(Germany) BMW Motorsport (Germany) Schnitzer Motorsport	(Netherlands) Peter Kox (Italy) Roberto Ravaglia	BMW S70 6.0L V12	**MI**	146
5	GT1	3	(United Kingdom) Gulf Team Davidoff (United Kingdom) GTC Racing	(France) Jean-Marc Gounon (France) Pierre-Henri Raphanel	McLaren F1 GTR	**MI**	146
5	GT1	3	(United Kingdom) Gulf Team Davidoff (United Kingdom) GTC Racing	(France) Jean-Marc Gounon (France) Pierre-Henri Raphanel	BMW S70 6.0L V12	**MI**	146
6	GT1	27	(United Kingdom) Parabolica Motorsport	(United Kingdom) Gary Ayles (United Kingdom) Chris Goodwin	McLaren F1 GTR	**MI**	144
6	GT1	27	(United Kingdom) Parabolica Motorsport	(United Kingdom) Gary Ayles (United Kingdom) Chris Goodwin	BMW S70 6.0L V12	**MI**	144
7	GT1	2	(United Kingdom) Gulf Team Davidoff (United Kingdom) GTC Racing	(Denmark) John Nielsen (Germany) Thomas Bscher	McLaren F1 GTR	**MI**	144
7	GT1	2	(United Kingdom) Gulf Team Davidoff (United Kingdom) GTC Racing	(Denmark) John Nielsen (Germany) Thomas Bscher	BMW S70 6.0L V12	**MI**	144
8	GT1	17	(France) JB Racing	(Germany) Jürgen von Gartzen (France) Emmanuel Collard	Porsche 911 GT1	**MI**	143
8	GT1	17	(France) JB Racing	(Germany) Jürgen von Gartzen (France) Emmanuel Collard	Porsche 3.2L Turbo Flat-6	**MI**	143
9	GT1	21	(Germany) Kremer Racing	(France) Christophe Bouchut (Sweden) Carl Rosenblad	Porsche 911 GT1	**G**	143
9	GT1	21	(Germany) Kremer Racing	(France) Christophe Bouchut (Sweden) Carl Rosenblad	Porsche 3.2L Turbo Flat-6	**G**	143
10	GT1	6	(Germany) Porsche AG	(Germany) Hans-Joachim Stuck (Belgium) Thierry Boutsen	Porsche 911 GT1 Evo	**MI**	142
10	GT1	6	(Germany) Porsche AG	(Germany) Hans-Joachim Stuck (Belgium) Thierry Boutsen	Porsche 3.2L Turbo Flat-6	**MI**	142
11	GT1	14	(United Kingdom) GT1 Racing Franck Muller	(Netherlands) Jan Lammers (Netherlands) Mike Hezemans	Lotus Elise GT1	**P**	142
11	GT1	14	(United Kingdom) GT1 Racing Franck Muller	(Netherlands) Jan Lammers (Netherlands) Mike Hezemans	Chevrolet LT5 6.0L V8	**P**	142
12	GT1	22	(Italy) BMS Scuderia Italia	(Italy) Christian Pescatori (Italy) Pierluigi Martini	Porsche 911 GT1	**P**	141
12	GT1	22	(Italy) BMS Scuderia Italia	(Italy) Christian Pescatori (Italy) Pierluigi Martini	Porsche 3.2L Turbo Flat-6	**P**	141
13	GT1	5	(United Kingdom) David Price Racing	(Australia) David Brabham (United Kingdom) Perry McCarthy	Panoz Esperante GTR-1	**G**	136
13	GT1	5	(United Kingdom) David Price Racing	(Australia) David Brabham (United Kingdom) Perry McCarthy	Ford (Roush) 6.0L V8	**G**	136
14	GT1	4	(United Kingdom) David Price Racing	(United Kingdom) Andy Wallace (United Kingdom) James Weaver	Panoz Esperante GTR-1	**G**	134
14	GT1	4	(United Kingdom) David Price Racing	(United Kingdom) Andy Wallace (United Kingdom) James Weaver	Ford (Roush) 6.0L V8	**G**	134
15	GT1	24	(United Kingdom) GBF UK Ltd.	(United Kingdom) Martin Stretton (Italy) Andrea Boldrini	Lotus Elise GT1	**MI**	134
15	GT1	24	(United Kingdom) GBF UK Ltd.	(United Kingdom) Martin Stretton (Italy) Andrea Boldrini	Lotus 3.5L Turbo V8	**MI**	134
16	**GT2**	**56**	**(Germany) Roock Racing**	**(Germany) Claudia Hürtgen (Switzerland) Bruno Eichmann (Portugal) Ni Amorim**	**Porsche 911 GT2**	**MI**	**133**
16	**GT2**	**56**	**(Germany) Roock Racing**	**(Germany) Claudia Hürtgen (Switzerland) Bruno Eichmann (Portugal) Ni Amorim**	**Porsche 3.6L Turbo Flat-6**	**MI**	**133**
17	GT1	25	(France) BBA Compétition	(France) David Velay (France) Jean-Luc Maury-Laribière	McLaren F1 GTR	**D**	133
17	GT1	25	(France) BBA Compétition	(France) David Velay (France) Jean-Luc Maury-Laribière	BMW S70 6.1L V12	**D**	133
18	GT2	52	(France) Viper Team Oreca	(United Kingdom) Justin Bell (Belgium) Marc Duez	Chrysler Viper GTS-R	**MI**	132
18	GT2	52	(France) Viper Team Oreca	(United Kingdom) Justin Bell (Belgium) Marc Duez	Chrysler 8.0L V10	**MI**	132
19	GT2	66	(Germany) Konrad Motorsport	(Austria) Franz Konrad (Switzerland) Toni Seiler (Netherlands) Bert Ploeg	Porsche 911 GT2	**P**	132
19	GT2	66	(Germany) Konrad Motorsport	(Austria) Franz Konrad (Switzerland) Toni Seiler (Netherlands) Bert Ploeg	Porsche 3.6L Turbo Flat-6	**P**	132
20	GT2	63	(Germany) Krauss Motorsport	(Germany) Michael Trunk (Germany) Bernhard Müller	Porsche 911 GT2	**P**	131
20	GT2	63	(Germany) Krauss Motorsport	(Germany) Michael Trunk (Germany) Bernhard Müller	Porsche 3.6L Turbo Flat-6	**P**	131
21	GT2	61	(Switzerland) Stadler Motorsport	(Germany) Ulli Richter (Switzerland) Enzo Calderari (Switzerland) Lilian Bryner	Porsche 911 GT2	**P**	131
21	GT2	61	(Switzerland) Stadler Motorsport	(Germany) Ulli Richter (Switzerland) Enzo Calderari (Switzerland) Lilian Bryner	Porsche 3.6L Turbo Flat-6	**P**	131
22	GT2	73	(Germany) Seikel Motorsport	(Germany) Wolfgang Haugg (Germany) Fred Rosterg (Italy) Giuseppe Quargenten	Porsche 911 GT2	?	129
22	GT2	73	(Germany) Seikel Motorsport	(Germany) Wolfgang Haugg (Germany) Fred Rosterg (Italy) Giuseppe Quargenten	Porsche 3.6L Turbo Flat-6	?	129
23	GT2	68	(Italy) Rennsport Italia	(Italy) Angelo Zadra (Italy) Leonardo Maddalena (Italy) Renato Mastropietro	Porsche 911 GT2	?	129
23	GT2	68	(Italy) Rennsport Italia	(Italy) Angelo Zadra (Italy) Leonardo Maddalena (Italy) Renato Mastropietro	Porsche 3.6L Turbo Flat-6	?	129
24	GT2	58	(France) Estoril Racing	(France) Michel Monteiro (Portugal) Manuel Monteiro	Porsche 911 GT2	?	129
24	GT2	58	(France) Estoril Racing	(France) Michel Monteiro (Portugal) Manuel Monteiro	Porsche 3.6L Turbo Flat-6	?	129
25	GT1	7	(Germany) Porsche AG	(France) Bob Wollek (France) Yannick Dalmas	Porsche 911 GT1 Evo	**MI**	127
25	GT1	7	(Germany) Porsche AG	(France) Bob Wollek (France) Yannick Dalmas	Porsche 3.2L Turbo Flat-6	**MI**	127
26	GT2	62	(Switzerland) Stadler Motorsport	(Switzerland) Bruno Michelotti (Switzerland) Uwe Sick (Germany) Axel Röhr	Porsche 911 GT2	**P**	127
26	GT2	62	(Switzerland) Stadler Motorsport	(Switzerland) Bruno Michelotti (Switzerland) Uwe Sick (Germany) Axel Röhr	Porsche 3.6L Turbo Flat-6	**P**	127
27	GT2	57	(Germany) Roock Racing	(France) Stéphane Ortelli (United Kingdom) Hugh Price (United Kingdom) John Robinson	Porsche 911 GT2	**MI**	127
27	GT2	57	(Germany) Roock Racing	(France) Stéphane Ortelli (United Kingdom) Hugh Price (United Kingdom) John Robinson	Porsche 3.6L Turbo Flat-6	**MI**	127
28	GT2	69	(Germany) Proton Motorsport	(Germany) Gerold Ried (France) Patrick Vuillaume	Porsche 911 GT2	**P**	126
28	GT2	69	(Germany) Proton Motorsport	(Germany) Gerold Ried (France) Patrick Vuillaume	Porsche 3.6L Turbo Flat-6	**P**	126
29	GT1	20	(France) DAMS Panoz	(France) Éric Bernard (France) Franck Lagorce	Panoz Esperante GTR-1	**MI**	124
29	GT1	20	(France) DAMS Panoz	(France) Éric Bernard (France) Franck Lagorce	Ford (Roush) 6.0L V8	**MI**	124
30	GT2	81	(Germany) Michael Eschmann (Germany) Automobil Club Radevormwald	(Germany) Michael Eschmann (Germany) Paul Hulverscheid (Germany) Gunter Döbler	Porsche 911 GT2	?	123
30	GT2	81	(Germany) Michael Eschmann (Germany) Automobil Club Radevormwald	(Germany) Michael Eschmann (Germany) Paul Hulverscheid (Germany) Gunter Döbler	Porsche 3.6L Turbo Flat-6	?	123
31	GT2	71	(Italy) GT Racing Team	(Italy) Luca Drudi (Italy) Luigino Pagotto	Porsche 911 GT2	?	123
31	GT2	71	(Italy) GT Racing Team	(Italy) Luca Drudi (Italy) Luigino Pagotto	Porsche 3.6L Turbo Flat-6	?	123
32	GT2	50	(United Kingdom) Agusta Racing Team	(Italy) Rocky Agusta (Italy) Almo Coppelli	Callaway Corvette LM-GT	**D**	122
32	GT2	50	(United Kingdom) Agusta Racing Team	(Italy) Rocky Agusta (Italy) Almo Coppelli	Chevrolet 6.3L V8	**D**	122
33	GT2	53	(United Kingdom) Chamberlain Engineering	(United Kingdom) David Goode (Republic of Ireland) Tim O'Kennedy (Netherlands) Hans Hugenholtz	Chrysler Viper GTS-R	**G**	122
33	GT2	53	(United Kingdom) Chamberlain Engineering	(United Kingdom) David Goode (Republic of Ireland) Tim O'Kennedy (Netherlands) Hans Hugenholtz	Chrysler 8.0L V10	**G**	122
34	GT2	75	(United Kingdom) G-Force	(United Kingdom) Geoff Lister (United Kingdom) John Greasley (Sweden) Magnus Wallinder	Porsche 911 GT2	**D**	112
34	GT2	75	(United Kingdom) G-Force	(United Kingdom) Geoff Lister (United Kingdom) John Greasley (Sweden) Magnus Wallinder	Porsche 3.6L Turbo Flat-6	**D**	112
35	GT2	51	(France) Viper Team Oreca	(Monaco) Olivier Beretta (France) Philippe Gache	Chrysler Viper GTS-R	**MI**	101
35	GT2	51	(France) Viper Team Oreca	(Monaco) Olivier Beretta (France) Philippe Gache	Chrysler 8.0L V10	**MI**	101
36 DNF	GT2	59	(Netherlands) Marcos Racing International	(Netherlands) Cor Euser (Germany) Harald Becker	Marcos LM600	**D**	83
36 DNF	GT2	59	(Netherlands) Marcos Racing International	(Netherlands) Cor Euser (Germany) Harald Becker	Chevrolet 5.9L V8	**D**	83
37 DNF	GT1	26	(Germany) Konrad Motorsport	(Italy) Mauro Baldi (Italy) Ivan Capelli (Germany) Gerd Ruch	Porsche 911 GT1	**P**	81
37 DNF	GT1	26	(Germany) Konrad Motorsport	(Italy) Mauro Baldi (Italy) Ivan Capelli (Germany) Gerd Ruch	Porsche 3.2L Turbo Flat-6	**P**	81
38 DNF	GT1	13	(United Kingdom) GT1 Racing Franck Muller	(France) Fabien Giroix (Switzerland) Jean-Denis Délétraz	Lotus Elise GT1	**P**	74
38 DNF	GT1	13	(United Kingdom) GT1 Racing Franck Muller	(France) Fabien Giroix (Switzerland) Jean-Denis Délétraz	Chevrolet LT5 6.0L V8	**P**	74
39 DNF	GT2	70	(Germany) Dellenbach Motorsport	(Germany) Güther Blieninger (Austria) Wolfgang Treml (Germany) Rainer Bonnetsmüller	Porsche 911 GT2	**D**	73
39 DNF	GT2	70	(Germany) Dellenbach Motorsport	(Germany) Güther Blieninger (Austria) Wolfgang Treml (Germany) Rainer Bonnetsmüller	Porsche 3.6L Turbo Flat-6	**D**	73
40 DNF	GT2	65	(Germany) RWS	(Italy) Luca Riccitelli (Italy) Raffaele Sangiuolo	Porsche 911 GT2	?	65
40 DNF	GT2	65	(Germany) RWS	(Italy) Luca Riccitelli (Italy) Raffaele Sangiuolo	Porsche 3.6L Turbo Flat-6	?	65
41 DNF	GT1	16	(Germany) Roock Racing	(Germany) Ralf Kelleners (France) Stéphane Ortelli (Portugal) Pedro Chaves	Porsche 911 GT1	**MI**	49
41 DNF	GT1	16	(Germany) Roock Racing	(Germany) Ralf Kelleners (France) Stéphane Ortelli (Portugal) Pedro Chaves	Porsche 3.2L Turbo Flat-6	**MI**	49
42 DNF	GT2	55	(Austria) Augustin Motorsport	(Austria) Manfred Jurasz (Germany) Helmut Reis (Germany) Wido Rössler	Porsche 911 GT2	**G**	43
42 DNF	GT2	55	(Austria) Augustin Motorsport	(Austria) Manfred Jurasz (Germany) Helmut Reis (Germany) Wido Rössler	Porsche 3.6L Turbo Flat-6	**G**	43
43 DNF	GT1	12	(Germany) AMG-Mercedes	(Germany) Klaus Ludwig (Germany) Bernd Mayländer	Mercedes-Benz CLK GTR	**B**	42
43 DNF	GT1	12	(Germany) AMG-Mercedes	(Germany) Klaus Ludwig (Germany) Bernd Mayländer	Mercedes-Benz LS600 6.0L V12	**B**	42
44 DNF	GT1	1	(United Kingdom) Gulf Team Davidoff (United Kingdom) GTC Racing	(United Kingdom) Andrew Gilbert-Scott (Sweden) Anders Olofsson	McLaren F1 GTR	**MI**	28
44 DNF	GT1	1	(United Kingdom) Gulf Team Davidoff (United Kingdom) GTC Racing	(United Kingdom) Andrew Gilbert-Scott (Sweden) Anders Olofsson	BMW S70 6.0L V12	**MI**	28
45 DNF	GT1	31	(Austria) Augustin Motorsport	(Austria) Hans-Jörg Hofer (Germany) Stefan Roitmayer (Italy) Stefano Buttiero	Porsche 911 GT2 Evo	**G**	28
45 DNF	GT1	31	(Austria) Augustin Motorsport	(Austria) Hans-Jörg Hofer (Germany) Stefan Roitmayer (Italy) Stefano Buttiero	Porsche 3.6L Turbo Flat-6	**G**	28
46 DNF	GT1	23	(United Kingdom) GBF UK Ltd.	(Italy) Luca Badoer (Italy) Mimmo Schiattarella	Lotus Elise GT1	**P**	22
46 DNF	GT1	23	(United Kingdom) GBF UK Ltd.	(Italy) Luca Badoer (Italy) Mimmo Schiattarella	Lotus 3.5L Turbo V8	**P**	22
47 DNF	GT1	15	(France) First Racing Project (United Kingdom) GT1 Racing	(Thailand) Ratanakul Prutirat (Germany) Alexander Grau	Lotus Elise GT1	**P**	3
47 DNF	GT1	15	(France) First Racing Project (United Kingdom) GT1 Racing	(Thailand) Ratanakul Prutirat (Germany) Alexander Grau	Chevrolet LT5 6.0L V8	**P**	3

== Statistics ==
- Pole Position – Bernd Schneider (#11 AMG-Mercedes) – 1:31.488
- Fastest Lap – Bernd Schneider (#11 AMG-Mercedes) – 1:33.614
- Distance – 667.674 km
- Average Speed – 166.785 km/h

FIA GT Championship
Previous race: 1997 FIA GT Helsinki 3 Hours	1997 season	Next race: 1997 FIA GT Spa 4 Hours
