= 1997 FIA GT Donington 4 Hours =

Layout of the Donington Park

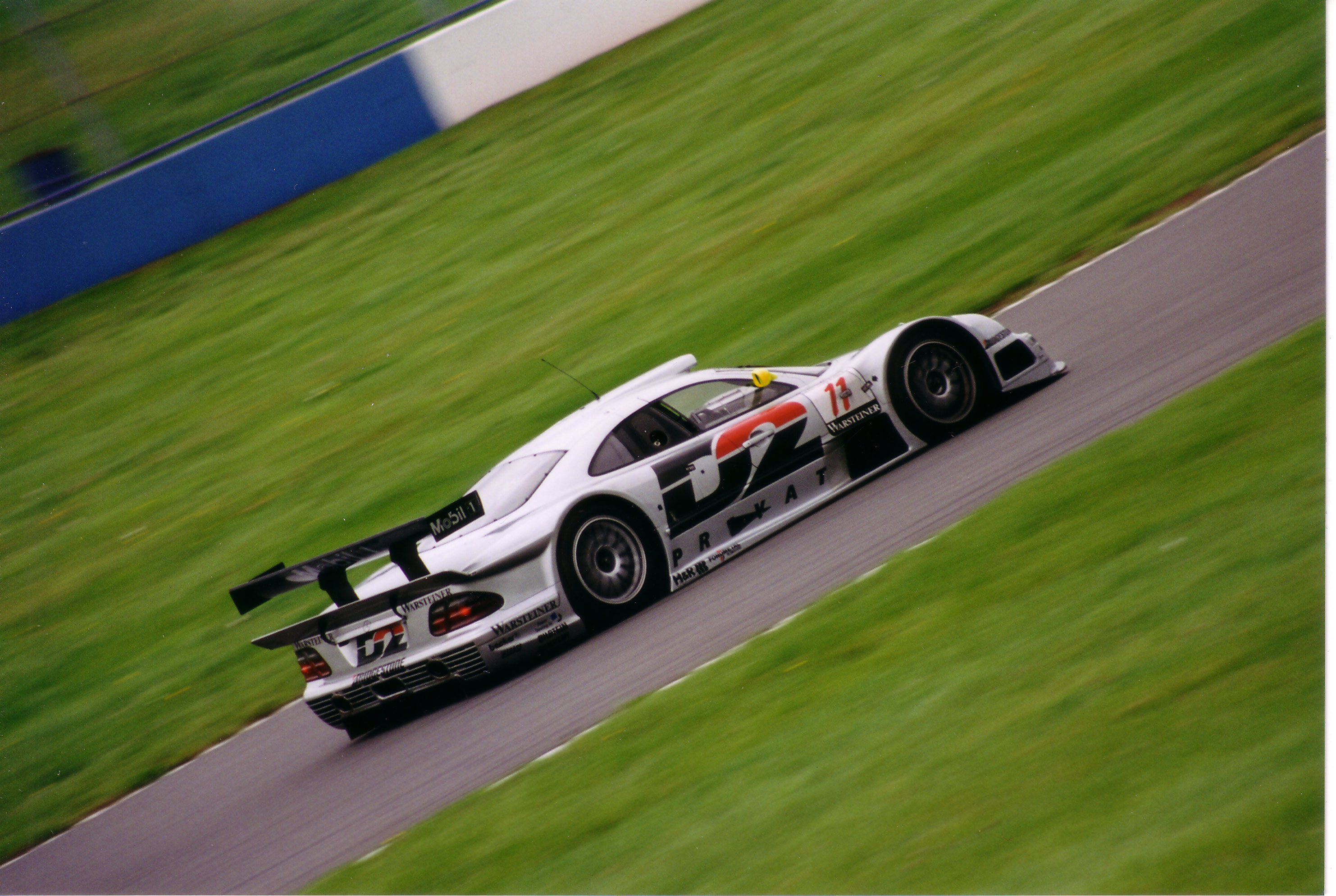
The race-winning Mercedes-Benz CLK GTR

The 1997 FIA GT Donington 4 Hours was the eighth race of the 1997 FIA GT Championship season. It was run at Donington Park, England on September 14, 1997.

== Official results ==
Class winners in bold. Cars failing to complete 75% of winner's distance marked as Not Classified (NC).

Pos	Class	No	Team	Drivers	Chassis	Tyre	Laps
Pos	Class	No	Team	Drivers	Engine	Tyre	Laps
1	**GT1**	**11**	**(Germany) AMG-Mercedes**	**(Germany) Bernd Schneider (Austria) Alexander Wurz**	**Mercedes-Benz CLK GTR**	**B**	**159**
1	**GT1**	**11**	**(Germany) AMG-Mercedes**	**(Germany) Bernd Schneider (Austria) Alexander Wurz**	**Mercedes-Benz LS600 6.0L V12**	**B**	**159**
2	GT1	10	(Germany) AMG-Mercedes	(Germany) Marcel Tiemann (Italy) Alessandro Nannini	Mercedes-Benz CLK GTR	**B**	159
2	GT1	10	(Germany) AMG-Mercedes	(Germany) Marcel Tiemann (Italy) Alessandro Nannini	Mercedes-Benz LS600 6.0L V12	**B**	159
3	GT1	8	(Germany) BMW Motorsport (Germany) Schnitzer Motorsport	(Finland) JJ Lehto (United Kingdom) Steve Soper	McLaren F1 GTR	**MI**	159
3	GT1	8	(Germany) BMW Motorsport (Germany) Schnitzer Motorsport	(Finland) JJ Lehto (United Kingdom) Steve Soper	BMW S70 6.0L V12	**MI**	159
4	GT1	12	(Germany) AMG-Mercedes	(Germany) Klaus Ludwig (Germany) Bernd Mayländer	Mercedes-Benz CLK GTR	**B**	158
4	GT1	12	(Germany) AMG-Mercedes	(Germany) Klaus Ludwig (Germany) Bernd Mayländer	Mercedes-Benz LS600 6.0L V12	**B**	158
5	GT1	9	(Germany) BMW Motorsport (Germany) Schnitzer Motorsport	(Netherlands) Peter Kox (Italy) Roberto Ravaglia	McLaren F1 GTR	**MI**	158
5	GT1	9	(Germany) BMW Motorsport (Germany) Schnitzer Motorsport	(Netherlands) Peter Kox (Italy) Roberto Ravaglia	BMW S70 6.0L V12	**MI**	158
6	GT1	3	(United Kingdom) Gulf Team Davidoff (United Kingdom) GTC Racing	(France) Pierre-Henri Raphanel (France) Jean-Marc Gounon	McLaren F1 GTR	**MI**	157
6	GT1	3	(United Kingdom) Gulf Team Davidoff (United Kingdom) GTC Racing	(France) Pierre-Henri Raphanel (France) Jean-Marc Gounon	BMW S70 6.0L V12	**MI**	157
7	GT1	1	(United Kingdom) Gulf Team Davidoff (United Kingdom) GTC Racing	(United Kingdom) Geoff Lees (Sweden) Anders Olofsson	McLaren F1 GTR	**MI**	156
7	GT1	1	(United Kingdom) Gulf Team Davidoff (United Kingdom) GTC Racing	(United Kingdom) Geoff Lees (Sweden) Anders Olofsson	BMW S70 6.0L V12	**MI**	156
8	GT1	5	(United Kingdom) David Price Racing	(Australia) David Brabham (United Kingdom) Perry McCarthy	Panoz Esperante GTR-1	**G**	155
8	GT1	5	(United Kingdom) David Price Racing	(Australia) David Brabham (United Kingdom) Perry McCarthy	Ford (Roush) 6.0L V8	**G**	155
9	GT1	4	(United Kingdom) David Price Racing	(United Kingdom) Andy Wallace (United Kingdom) James Weaver	Panoz Esperante GTR-1	**G**	154
9	GT1	4	(United Kingdom) David Price Racing	(United Kingdom) Andy Wallace (United Kingdom) James Weaver	Ford (Roush) 6.0L V8	**G**	154
10	GT1	22	(Italy) BMS Scuderia Italia	(Italy) Pierluigi Martini (Italy) Christian Pescatori	Porsche 911 GT1	**P**	152
10	GT1	22	(Italy) BMS Scuderia Italia	(Italy) Pierluigi Martini (Italy) Christian Pescatori	Porsche 3.2L Turbo Flat-6	**P**	152
11	GT1	6	(Germany) Porsche AG	(Belgium) Thierry Boutsen (Germany) Hans-Joachim Stuck	Porsche 911 GT1 Evo	**MI**	151
11	GT1	6	(Germany) Porsche AG	(Belgium) Thierry Boutsen (Germany) Hans-Joachim Stuck	Porsche 3.2L Turbo Flat-6	**MI**	151
12	GT1	23	(United Kingdom) GBF UK Ltd.	(Italy) Luca Badoer (Italy) Mimmo Schiattarella	Lotus Elise GT1	**MI**	151
12	GT1	23	(United Kingdom) GBF UK Ltd.	(Italy) Luca Badoer (Italy) Mimmo Schiattarella	Lotus 3.5L Turbo V8	**MI**	151
13	GT1	27	(United Kingdom) Parabolica Motorsport	(United Kingdom) Gary Ayles (United Kingdom) Chris Goodwin	McLaren F1 GTR	**MI**	150
13	GT1	27	(United Kingdom) Parabolica Motorsport	(United Kingdom) Gary Ayles (United Kingdom) Chris Goodwin	BMW S70 6.0L V12	**MI**	150
14	GT1	30	(United Kingdom) G-Force Strandell	(Sweden) Magnus Wallinder (United Kingdom) Geoff Lister (United Kingdom) John Greasley	Porsche 911 GT1	**D**	149
14	GT1	30	(United Kingdom) G-Force Strandell	(Sweden) Magnus Wallinder (United Kingdom) Geoff Lister (United Kingdom) John Greasley	Porsche 3.2L Turbo Flat-6	**D**	149
15	**GT2**	**51**	**(France) Viper Team Oreca**	**(Monaco) Olivier Beretta (France) Philippe Gache**	**Chrysler Viper GTS-R**	**MI**	**146**
15	**GT2**	**51**	**(France) Viper Team Oreca**	**(Monaco) Olivier Beretta (France) Philippe Gache**	**Chrysler 8.0L V10**	**MI**	**146**
16	GT1	7	(Germany) Porsche AG	(France) Bob Wollek (France) Yannick Dalmas	Porsche 911 GT1 Evo	**MI**	145
16	GT1	7	(Germany) Porsche AG	(France) Bob Wollek (France) Yannick Dalmas	Porsche 3.2L Turbo Flat-6	**MI**	145
17	GT2	56	(Germany) Roock Racing	(Switzerland) Bruno Eichmann (France) Stéphane Ortelli (Germany) Claudia Hürtgen	Porsche 911 GT2	**MI**	145
17	GT2	56	(Germany) Roock Racing	(Switzerland) Bruno Eichmann (France) Stéphane Ortelli (Germany) Claudia Hürtgen	Porsche 3.6L Turbo Flat-6	**MI**	145
18	GT2	52	(France) Viper Team Oreca	(United Kingdom) Justin Bell (Italy) Luca Drudi	Chrysler Viper GTS-R	**MI**	144
18	GT2	52	(France) Viper Team Oreca	(United Kingdom) Justin Bell (Italy) Luca Drudi	Chrysler 8.0L V10	**MI**	144
19	GT2	57	(Germany) Roock Racing	(Portugal) Pedro Chaves (Portugal) Ni Amorim (France) François Lafon	Porsche 911 GT2	**MI**	144
19	GT2	57	(Germany) Roock Racing	(Portugal) Pedro Chaves (Portugal) Ni Amorim (France) François Lafon	Porsche 3.6L Turbo Flat-6	**MI**	144
20	GT2	66	(Germany) Konrad Motorsport	(Austria) Franz Konrad (Switzerland) Toni Seiler (Germany) André Ahrlé	Porsche 911 GT2	**P**	142
20	GT2	66	(Germany) Konrad Motorsport	(Austria) Franz Konrad (Switzerland) Toni Seiler (Germany) André Ahrlé	Porsche 3.6L Turbo Flat-6	**P**	142
21	GT2	50	(United Kingdom) Agusta Racing Team (Switzerland) Elf Haberthur Racing	(France) Patrice Goueslard (Belgium) Michel Neugarten (Italy) Luigino Pagotto	Porsche 911 GT2	?	141
21	GT2	50	(United Kingdom) Agusta Racing Team (Switzerland) Elf Haberthur Racing	(France) Patrice Goueslard (Belgium) Michel Neugarten (Italy) Luigino Pagotto	Porsche 3.6L Turbo Flat-6	?	141
22	GT2	63	(Germany) Krauss Motorsport	(Germany) Michael Trunk (Germany) Bernhard Müller	Porsche 911 GT2	**P**	140
22	GT2	63	(Germany) Krauss Motorsport	(Germany) Michael Trunk (Germany) Bernhard Müller	Porsche 3.6L Turbo Flat-6	**P**	140
23	GT2	64	(Germany) Kremer Racing	(Spain) Alfonso de Orléans-Bourbon (Spain) Tomas Saldaña	Porsche 911 GT2	**G**	139
23	GT2	64	(Germany) Kremer Racing	(Spain) Alfonso de Orléans-Bourbon (Spain) Tomas Saldaña	Porsche 3.6L Turbo Flat-6	**G**	139
24	GT2	70	(Germany) Dellenbach Motorsport	(Germany) Klaus Horn (Germany) Günther Blieninger (Germany) Rainer Bonnetmsüller	Porsche 911 GT2	**D**	137
24	GT2	70	(Germany) Dellenbach Motorsport	(Germany) Klaus Horn (Germany) Günther Blieninger (Germany) Rainer Bonnetmsüller	Porsche 3.6L Turbo Flat-6	**D**	137
25	GT2	69	(Germany) Proton Competition	(Germany) Gerold Ried (France) Patrick Vuillaume (Austria) Manfred Jurasz	Porsche 911 GT2	**P**	136
25	GT2	69	(Germany) Proton Competition	(Germany) Gerold Ried (France) Patrick Vuillaume (Austria) Manfred Jurasz	Porsche 3.6L Turbo Flat-6	**P**	136
26	GT1	31	(Austria) Augustin Motorsport	(Austria) Horst Felbermayr Sr. (Austria) Horst Felbermayr Jr. (Italy) Stefano Buttiero	Porsche 911 GT2 Evo	**G**	130
26	GT1	31	(Austria) Augustin Motorsport	(Austria) Horst Felbermayr Sr. (Austria) Horst Felbermayr Jr. (Italy) Stefano Buttiero	Porsche 3.6L Turbo Flat-6	**G**	130
27	GT2	60	(Netherlands) Marcos Racing International	(Brazil) Thomas Erdos (United Kingdom) Christian Vann	Marcos LM600	**D**	124
27	GT2	60	(Netherlands) Marcos Racing International	(Brazil) Thomas Erdos (United Kingdom) Christian Vann	Chevrolet 5.9L V8	**D**	124
28	GT2	53	(United Kingdom) Chamberlain Engineering	(United Kingdom) David Goode (Italy) Leonardo Maddalena (Australia) Paul Thomas	Chrysler Viper GTS-R	**G**	119
28	GT2	53	(United Kingdom) Chamberlain Engineering	(United Kingdom) David Goode (Italy) Leonardo Maddalena (Australia) Paul Thomas	Chrysler 8.0L V10	**G**	119
29	GT1	14	(United Kingdom) GT1 Lotus Racing	(Netherlands) Jan Lammers (Netherlands) Mike Hezemans	Lotus Elise GT1	**MI**	111
29	GT1	14	(United Kingdom) GT1 Lotus Racing	(Netherlands) Jan Lammers (Netherlands) Mike Hezemans	Chevrolet LT5 6.0L V8	**MI**	111
30 DNF	GT1	13	(United Kingdom) GT1 Lotus Racing	(France) Fabien Giroix (Switzerland) Jean-Denis Délétraz	Lotus Elise GT1	**MI**	82
30 DNF	GT1	13	(United Kingdom) GT1 Lotus Racing	(France) Fabien Giroix (Switzerland) Jean-Denis Délétraz	Chevrolet LT5 6.0L V8	**MI**	82
31 DNF	GT2	59	(Netherlands) Marcos Racing International	(Netherlands) Cor Euser (Germany) Harald Becker	Marcos LM600	**D**	80
31 DNF	GT2	59	(Netherlands) Marcos Racing International	(Netherlands) Cor Euser (Germany) Harald Becker	Chevrolet 5.9L V8	**D**	80
32 DNF	GT1	20	(France) DAMS Panoz	(France) Éric Bernard (France) Franck Lagorce	Panoz Esperante GTR-1	**MI**	73
32 DNF	GT1	20	(France) DAMS Panoz	(France) Éric Bernard (France) Franck Lagorce	Ford (Roush) 6.0L V8	**MI**	73
33 DNF	GT1	21	(Germany) Kremer Racing	(France) Christophe Bouchut (Sweden) Carl Rosenblad	Porsche 911 GT1	**G**	56
33 DNF	GT1	21	(Germany) Kremer Racing	(France) Christophe Bouchut (Sweden) Carl Rosenblad	Porsche 3.2L Turbo Flat-6	**G**	56
34 DNF	GT2	54	(United Kingdom) Chamberlain Engineering	(Republic of Ireland) Tim O'Kennedy (Netherlands) Hans Hugenholtz (Germany) Wido Rösssler	Chrysler Viper GTS-R	**G**	38
34 DNF	GT2	54	(United Kingdom) Chamberlain Engineering	(Republic of Ireland) Tim O'Kennedy (Netherlands) Hans Hugenholtz (Germany) Wido Rösssler	Chrysler 8.0L V10	**G**	38
35 DNF	GT2	82	(United Kingdom) Colin Blower Motorsport	(United Kingdom) Colin Blower (United Kingdom) Jamie Campbell-Walter	TVR Cerbera GT	**D**	38
35 DNF	GT2	82	(United Kingdom) Colin Blower Motorsport	(United Kingdom) Colin Blower (United Kingdom) Jamie Campbell-Walter	TVR-Rover 5.0L V8	**D**	38
36 DNF	GT1	75	(United Kingdom) G-Force Strandell	(Sweden) Koit Veertee (United Kingdom) Nigel Barrett	Porsche 911 GT2	**D**	35
36 DNF	GT1	75	(United Kingdom) G-Force Strandell	(Sweden) Koit Veertee (United Kingdom) Nigel Barrett	Porsche 3.6L Turbo Flat-6	**D**	35
37 DNF	GT2	86	(United Kingdom) Millennium Motorsport	(United Kingdom) Nick Carr (United Kingdom) Ian Astley (United Kingdom) Andy Purvis	Marcos LM600	?	34
37 DNF	GT2	86	(United Kingdom) Millennium Motorsport	(United Kingdom) Nick Carr (United Kingdom) Ian Astley (United Kingdom) Andy Purvis	Chevrolet 5.9L V8	?	34
38 DNF	GT2	77	(United States) Saleen-Allen Speedlab (United Kingdom) Cirtek Motorsport	(United Kingdom) Peter Owen (United Kingdom) Jonathan Baker (United Kingdom) Mark Peters	Saleen Mustang RRR	**D**	27
38 DNF	GT2	77	(United States) Saleen-Allen Speedlab (United Kingdom) Cirtek Motorsport	(United Kingdom) Peter Owen (United Kingdom) Jonathan Baker (United Kingdom) Mark Peters	Ford 5.9L V8	**D**	27
39 DNF	GT1	24	(United Kingdom) GBF UK Ltd.	(Austria) Ralf Kalaschek (Italy) Max Angelelli (United Kingdom) Jason Yeomans	Lotus Elise GT1	**MI**	26
39 DNF	GT1	24	(United Kingdom) GBF UK Ltd.	(Austria) Ralf Kalaschek (Italy) Max Angelelli (United Kingdom) Jason Yeomans	Lotus 3.5L Turbo V8	**MI**	26
40 DNF	GT2	78	(United States) Saleen-Allen Speedlab (United Kingdom) Cirtek Motorsport	(United Kingdom) Robert Schirle (United Kingdom) David Warnock (United Kingdom) Richard Dean	Saleen Mustang RRR	**D**	24
40 DNF	GT2	78	(United States) Saleen-Allen Speedlab (United Kingdom) Cirtek Motorsport	(United Kingdom) Robert Schirle (United Kingdom) David Warnock (United Kingdom) Richard Dean	Ford 5.9L V8	**D**	24
41 DNF	GT1	19	(Germany) Martin Veyhle Racing (MVR)	(Germany) Alexander Grau (Germany) Marco Werner	Lotus Elise GT1	?	23
41 DNF	GT1	19	(Germany) Martin Veyhle Racing (MVR)	(Germany) Alexander Grau (Germany) Marco Werner	Lotus 3.5L Turbo V8	?	23
DNS	GT2	19	(United Kingdom) Morgan Motor Company	(United Kingdom) Charles Morgan (United Kingdom) William Wykeham	Morgan Plus 8 GTR	**D**	–
DNS	GT2	19	(United Kingdom) Morgan Motor Company	(United Kingdom) Charles Morgan (United Kingdom) William Wykeham	Rover 3.9L V8	**D**	–
DNS	GT2	87	(Germany) Roock Racing	(United Kingdom) John Robinson (United Kingdom) Robert Nearn (France) Michel Ligonnet	Porsche 911 GT2	**MI**	–
DNS	GT2	87	(Germany) Roock Racing	(United Kingdom) John Robinson (United Kingdom) Robert Nearn (France) Michel Ligonnet	Porsche 3.6L Turbo Flat-6	**MI**	–

== Statistics ==
- Pole Position – #11 AMG-Mercedes – 1:23.854
- Fastest Lap – #11 AMG-Mercedes – 1:26.075
- Distance – 639.177 km
- Average Speed – 159.776 km/h

FIA GT Championship
Previous race: 1997 Suzuka 1000km	1997 season	Next race: 1997 FIA GT Mugello 4 Hours
