= 1997 FIA GT Hockenheim 4 Hours =

Layout of the Hockenheimring GP Circuit (1994–2001)

The 1997 FIA GT Hockenheim 4 Hours was the inaugural race of the FIA GT Championship, which had replaced the former BPR Global GT Series in 1997. It was run at the Hockenheimring on April 13, 1997.

== Official results ==
Class winners in bold. Cars failing to complete 75% of winner's distance marked as Not Classified (NC).

Pos	Class	No	Team	Drivers	Chassis	Tyre	Laps
Pos	Class	No	Team	Drivers	Engine	Tyre	Laps
1	**GT1**	**8**	**(Germany) BMW Motorsport (Germany) Schnitzer Motorsport**	**(Finland) JJ Lehto (United Kingdom) Steve Soper**	**McLaren F1 GTR**	**MI**	**113**
1	**GT1**	**8**	**(Germany) BMW Motorsport (Germany) Schnitzer Motorsport**	**(Finland) JJ Lehto (United Kingdom) Steve Soper**	**BMW S70 6.0L V12**	**MI**	**113**
2	GT1	3	(United Kingdom) Gulf Team Davidoff (United Kingdom) GTC Racing	(France) Jean-Marc Gounon (France) Pierre-Henri Raphanel	McLaren F1 GTR	**MI**	113
2	GT1	3	(United Kingdom) Gulf Team Davidoff (United Kingdom) GTC Racing	(France) Jean-Marc Gounon (France) Pierre-Henri Raphanel	BMW S70 6.0L V12	**MI**	113
3	GT1	2	(United Kingdom) Gulf Team Davidoff (United Kingdom) GTC Racing	(Germany) Thomas Bscher (Denmark) John Nielsen	McLaren F1 GTR	**MI**	112
3	GT1	2	(United Kingdom) Gulf Team Davidoff (United Kingdom) GTC Racing	(Germany) Thomas Bscher (Denmark) John Nielsen	BMW S70 6.0L V12	**MI**	112
4	GT1	6	(Germany) Porsche AG	(Germany) Hans-Joachim Stuck (Belgium) Thierry Boutsen	Porsche 911 GT1	**MI**	112
4	GT1	6	(Germany) Porsche AG	(Germany) Hans-Joachim Stuck (Belgium) Thierry Boutsen	Porsche 3.2L Turbo Flat-6	**MI**	112
5	GT1	16	(Germany) Roock Racing	(Germany) Ralf Kelleners (France) Yannick Dalmas	Porsche 911 GT1	**MI**	111
5	GT1	16	(Germany) Roock Racing	(Germany) Ralf Kelleners (France) Yannick Dalmas	Porsche 3.2L Turbo Flat-6	**MI**	111
6	GT1	18	(Germany) Schübel Rennsport	(Portugal) Pedro Lamy (France) Bob Wollek	Porsche 911 GT1	**MI**	110
6	GT1	18	(Germany) Schübel Rennsport	(Portugal) Pedro Lamy (France) Bob Wollek	Porsche 3.2L Turbo Flat-6	**MI**	110
7	GT1	22	(Italy) BMS Scuderia Italia	(Italy) Pierluigi Martini (Italy) Christian Pescatori	Porsche 911 GT1	**P**	110
7	GT1	22	(Italy) BMS Scuderia Italia	(Italy) Pierluigi Martini (Italy) Christian Pescatori	Porsche 3.2L Turbo Flat-6	**P**	110
8	GT1	21	(Germany) Kremer Racing	(France) Christophe Bouchut (Germany) Klaus Ludwig (Sweden) Carl Rosenblad	Porsche 911 GT1	**G**	110
8	GT1	21	(Germany) Kremer Racing	(France) Christophe Bouchut (Germany) Klaus Ludwig (Sweden) Carl Rosenblad	Porsche 3.2L Turbo Flat-6	**G**	110
9	GT1	17	(France) JB Racing	(France) Emmanuel Collard (Germany) Jürgen von Gartzen	Porsche 911 GT1	**MI**	109
9	GT1	17	(France) JB Racing	(France) Emmanuel Collard (Germany) Jürgen von Gartzen	Porsche 3.2L Turbo Flat-6	**MI**	109
10	**GT2**	**51**	**(France) Viper Team Oreca**	**(Monaco) Olivier Beretta (France) Philippe Gache**	**Chrysler Viper GTS-R**	**MI**	**105**
10	**GT2**	**51**	**(France) Viper Team Oreca**	**(Monaco) Olivier Beretta (France) Philippe Gache**	**Chrysler 8.0L V10**	**MI**	**105**
11	GT1	4	(United Kingdom) David Price Racing	(United Kingdom) Andy Wallace (United Kingdom) James Weaver	Panoz Esperante GTR-1	**G**	105
11	GT1	4	(United Kingdom) David Price Racing	(United Kingdom) Andy Wallace (United Kingdom) James Weaver	Ford (Roush) 6.0L V8	**G**	105
12	GT2	52	(France) Viper Team Oreca	(United States) Tommy Archer (United Kingdom) Justin Bell	Chrysler Viper GTS-R	**MI**	104
12	GT2	52	(France) Viper Team Oreca	(United States) Tommy Archer (United Kingdom) Justin Bell	Chrysler 8.0L V10	**MI**	104
13	GT2	56	(Germany) Roock Racing	(Germany) Claudia Hürtgen (Switzerland) Bruno Eichmann (Portugal) Ni Amorim	Porsche 911 GT2	**MI**	104
13	GT2	56	(Germany) Roock Racing	(Germany) Claudia Hürtgen (Switzerland) Bruno Eichmann (Portugal) Ni Amorim	Porsche 3.6L Turbo Flat-6	**MI**	104
14	GT1	25	(France) BBA Compétition	(France) Jean-Luc Maury-Laribière (France) Olivier Thévenin	McLaren F1 GTR	**D**	104
14	GT1	25	(France) BBA Compétition	(France) Jean-Luc Maury-Laribière (France) Olivier Thévenin	BMW S70 6.1L V12	**D**	104
15	GT2	68	(Italy) Rennsport Italia	(Italy) Angelo Zadra (Italy) Marco Brand (Italy) Leonardo Maddalena	Porsche 911 GT2	?	102
15	GT2	68	(Italy) Rennsport Italia	(Italy) Angelo Zadra (Italy) Marco Brand (Italy) Leonardo Maddalena	Porsche 3.6L Turbo Flat-6	?	102
16	GT1	19	(Germany) Martin Veyhle Racing (MVR)	(Germany) Gerd Ruch (Germany) Alexander Burgstaller (Germany) Alexander Grau	McLaren F1 GTR	**G**	102
16	GT1	19	(Germany) Martin Veyhle Racing (MVR)	(Germany) Gerd Ruch (Germany) Alexander Burgstaller (Germany) Alexander Grau	BMW S70 6.1L V12	**G**	102
17	GT2	67	(Germany) Konrad Motorsport	(France) Michel Ligonnet (Switzerland) Toni Seiler (Italy) Marco Spinelli	Porsche 911 GT2	**P**	101
17	GT2	67	(Germany) Konrad Motorsport	(France) Michel Ligonnet (Switzerland) Toni Seiler (Italy) Marco Spinelli	Porsche 3.6L Turbo Flat-6	**P**	101
18	GT2	63	(Germany) Krauss Motorsport	(Germany) Bernhard Müller (Germany) Michael Trunk	Porsche 911 GT2	**P**	101
18	GT2	63	(Germany) Krauss Motorsport	(Germany) Bernhard Müller (Germany) Michael Trunk	Porsche 3.6L Turbo Flat-6	**P**	101
19	GT2	72	(Switzerland) Elf Haberthur Racing	(France) Jean-Claude Lagniez (France) Guy Martinolle	Porsche 911 GT2	**D**	100
19	GT2	72	(Switzerland) Elf Haberthur Racing	(France) Jean-Claude Lagniez (France) Guy Martinolle	Porsche 3.6L Turbo Flat-6	**D**	100
20	GT2	64	(Germany) Kremer Racing	(Spain) Tomás Saldaña (Spain) Alfonso de Orléans	Porsche 911 GT2	**G**	100
20	GT2	64	(Germany) Kremer Racing	(Spain) Tomás Saldaña (Spain) Alfonso de Orléans	Porsche 3.6L Turbo Flat-6	**G**	100
21	GT2	73	(Germany) Seikel Motorsport	(Italy) Ruggero Grassi (Italy) Renato Mastropietro (Germany) Fred Rosterg	Porsche 911 GT2	?	99
21	GT2	73	(Germany) Seikel Motorsport	(Italy) Ruggero Grassi (Italy) Renato Mastropietro (Germany) Fred Rosterg	Porsche 3.6L Turbo Flat-6	?	99
22	GT2	69	(Germany) Proton Competition	(Germany) Gerold Ried (Germany) Ernst Gschwender (France) Patrick Vuillaume	Porsche 911 GT2	**P**	99
22	GT2	69	(Germany) Proton Competition	(Germany) Gerold Ried (Germany) Ernst Gschwender (France) Patrick Vuillaume	Porsche 3.6L Turbo Flat-6	**P**	99
23	GT2	58	(France) Estoril Racing	(Portugal) Manuel Monteiro (France) Michel Monteiro	Porsche 911 GT2	?	98
23	GT2	58	(France) Estoril Racing	(Portugal) Manuel Monteiro (France) Michel Monteiro	Porsche 3.6L Turbo Flat-6	?	98
24	GT2	62	(Switzerland) Stadler Motorsport	(Switzerland) Uwe Sick (Switzerland) Denis Lay (Germany) Axel Röhr	Porsche 911 GT2	**P**	98
24	GT2	62	(Switzerland) Stadler Motorsport	(Switzerland) Uwe Sick (Switzerland) Denis Lay (Germany) Axel Röhr	Porsche 3.6L Turbo Flat-6	**P**	98
25	GT2	57	(Germany) Roock Racing	(France) François Lafon (France) Jean-Marc Smadja (France) Stéphane Ortelli	Porsche 911 GT2	**MI**	96
25	GT2	57	(Germany) Roock Racing	(France) François Lafon (France) Jean-Marc Smadja (France) Stéphane Ortelli	Porsche 3.6L Turbo Flat-6	**MI**	96
26	GT2	70	(Germany) Dellenbach Motorsport	(Germany) Rainer Bonnetsmüller (Germany) Günther Blieninger (Austria) Manfred Jurasz	Porsche 911 GT2	**D**	89
26	GT2	70	(Germany) Dellenbach Motorsport	(Germany) Rainer Bonnetsmüller (Germany) Günther Blieninger (Austria) Manfred Jurasz	Porsche 3.6L Turbo Flat-6	**D**	89
27	GT1	10	(Germany) AMG-Mercedes	(Italy) Alessandro Nannini (Germany) Marcel Tiemann	Mercedes-Benz CLK GTR	**B**	89
27	GT1	10	(Germany) AMG-Mercedes	(Italy) Alessandro Nannini (Germany) Marcel Tiemann	Mercedes-Benz LS600 6.0L V12	**B**	89
28	GT2	53	(United Kingdom) Chamberlain Engineering	(Netherlands) Hans Hugenholtz (Finland) Jari Nurminen	Chrysler Viper GTS-R	**G**	76
28	GT2	53	(United Kingdom) Chamberlain Engineering	(Netherlands) Hans Hugenholtz (Finland) Jari Nurminen	Chrysler 8.0L V10	**G**	76
29 NC	GT2	66	(Germany) Konrad Motorsport	(Austria) Franz Konrad (Austria) Philipp Peter (Germany) Uwe Alzen	Porsche 911 GT2	**P**	75
29 NC	GT2	66	(Germany) Konrad Motorsport	(Austria) Franz Konrad (Austria) Philipp Peter (Germany) Uwe Alzen	Porsche 3.6L Turbo Flat-6	**P**	75
30 DNF	GT1	1	(United Kingdom) Gulf Team Davidoff (United Kingdom) GTC Racing	(United Kingdom) Ray Bellm (United Kingdom) Andrew Gilbert-Scott	McLaren F1 GTR	**MI**	57
30 DNF	GT1	1	(United Kingdom) Gulf Team Davidoff (United Kingdom) GTC Racing	(United Kingdom) Ray Bellm (United Kingdom) Andrew Gilbert-Scott	BMW S70 6.0L V12	**MI**	57
31 DNF	GT2	60	(Netherlands) Marcos Racing International	(Netherlands) Toon van de Haterd (Netherlands) Bert Ploeg	Marcos LM600	**D**	48
31 DNF	GT2	60	(Netherlands) Marcos Racing International	(Netherlands) Toon van de Haterd (Netherlands) Bert Ploeg	Chevrolet 5.9L V8	**D**	48
32 DNF	GT1	13	(United Kingdom) GT1 Lotus Racing (France) Giroix Racing	(France) Fabien Giroix (Switzerland) Jean-Denis Délétraz	Lotus Elise GT1	**P**	47
32 DNF	GT1	13	(United Kingdom) GT1 Lotus Racing (France) Giroix Racing	(France) Fabien Giroix (Switzerland) Jean-Denis Délétraz	Chevrolet LT5 6.0L V8	**P**	47
33 DNF	GT1	32	(France) Graham Racing	(France) Eric Graham (France) David Velay	Venturi 600LM	?	44
33 DNF	GT1	32	(France) Graham Racing	(France) Eric Graham (France) David Velay	Renault PRV 3.0L Turbo V6	?	44
34 DNF	GT1	23	(United Kingdom) GBF UK Ltd.	(Italy) Luca Badoer (Italy) Mimmo Schiattarella (Italy) Mauro Martini	Lotus Elise GT1	**MI**	42
34 DNF	GT1	23	(United Kingdom) GBF UK Ltd.	(Italy) Luca Badoer (Italy) Mimmo Schiattarella (Italy) Mauro Martini	Lotus 3.5L Turbo V8	**MI**	42
35 DNF	GT2	65	(Germany) RWS	(Germany) Wolfgang Münster (Italy) Raffaele Sangiuolo (Italy) Luca Riccitelli	Porsche 911 GT2	?	41
35 DNF	GT2	65	(Germany) RWS	(Germany) Wolfgang Münster (Italy) Raffaele Sangiuolo (Italy) Luca Riccitelli	Porsche 3.6L Turbo Flat-6	?	41
36 DNF	GT1	20	(France) DAMS Panoz	(France) Éric Bernard (France) Franck Lagorce	Panoz Esperante GTR-1	**MI**	39
36 DNF	GT1	20	(France) DAMS Panoz	(France) Éric Bernard (France) Franck Lagorce	Ford (Roush) 6.0L V8	**MI**	39
37 DNF	GT1	15	(United Kingdom) GT1 Lotus Racing (France) Giroix Racing	(France) Jérôme Policand (Brazil) Maurizio Sandro Sala	Lotus Elise GT1	**P**	37
37 DNF	GT1	15	(United Kingdom) GT1 Lotus Racing (France) Giroix Racing	(France) Jérôme Policand (Brazil) Maurizio Sandro Sala	Chevrolet LT5 6.0L V8	**P**	37
38 DNF	GT1	9	(Germany) BMW Motorsport (Germany) Schnitzer Motorsport	(Netherlands) Peter Kox (Italy) Roberto Ravaglia	McLaren F1 GTR	**MI**	29
38 DNF	GT1	9	(Germany) BMW Motorsport (Germany) Schnitzer Motorsport	(Netherlands) Peter Kox (Italy) Roberto Ravaglia	BMW S70 6.0L V12	**MI**	29
39 DNF	GT2	50	(United Kingdom) Agusta Racing Team	(Italy) Rocky Agusta (Italy) Almo Coppelli	Callaway Corvette LM-GT	**D**	27
39 DNF	GT2	50	(United Kingdom) Agusta Racing Team	(Italy) Rocky Agusta (Italy) Almo Coppelli	Chevrolet 6.3L V8	**D**	27
40 DNF	GT1	31	(Austria) Karl Augustin	(Austria) Karl Augustin (Austria) Horst Felbermayr (Italy) Stefano Buttiero	Porsche 911 GT2 Evo	**G**	24
40 DNF	GT1	31	(Austria) Karl Augustin	(Austria) Karl Augustin (Austria) Horst Felbermayr (Italy) Stefano Buttiero	Porsche 3.6L Turbo Flat-6	**G**	24
41 DNF	GT1	14	(United Kingdom) GT1 Lotus Racing (France) Giroix Racing	(Netherlands) Jan Lammers (Netherlands) Mike Hezemans	Lotus Elise GT1	**P**	23
41 DNF	GT1	14	(United Kingdom) GT1 Lotus Racing (France) Giroix Racing	(Netherlands) Jan Lammers (Netherlands) Mike Hezemans	Chevrolet LT5 6.0L V8	**P**	23
42 DNF	GT2	59	(Netherlands) Marcos Racing International	(Netherlands) Cor Euser (Germany) Harald Becker	Marcos LM600	**D**	23
42 DNF	GT2	59	(Netherlands) Marcos Racing International	(Netherlands) Cor Euser (Germany) Harald Becker	Chevrolet 5.9L V8	**D**	23
43 DNF	GT2	61	(Switzerland) Stadler Motorsport	(Switzerland) Enzo Calderari (Switzerland) Lilian Bryner	Porsche 911 GT2	**P**	9
43 DNF	GT2	61	(Switzerland) Stadler Motorsport	(Switzerland) Enzo Calderari (Switzerland) Lilian Bryner	Porsche 3.6L Turbo Flat-6	**P**	9
44 DNF	GT1	11	(Germany) AMG-Mercedes	(Germany) Bernd Schneider (Austria) Alexander Wurz	Mercedes-Benz CLK GTR	**B**	5
44 DNF	GT1	11	(Germany) AMG-Mercedes	(Germany) Bernd Schneider (Austria) Alexander Wurz	Mercedes-Benz LS600 6.0L V12	**B**	5
45 DNF	GT2	55	(Austria) Karl Augustin	(Austria) Hans-Jörg Hofer (Germany) Helmut Reis (Germany) Wido Rössler	Porsche 911 GT2	**G**	3
45 DNF	GT2	55	(Austria) Karl Augustin	(Austria) Hans-Jörg Hofer (Germany) Helmut Reis (Germany) Wido Rössler	Porsche 3.6L Turbo Flat-6	**G**	3
DNS	GT1	5	(United Kingdom) David Price Racing	(Australia) David Brabham (United Kingdom) Perry McCarthy	Panoz Esperante GTR-1	**G**	–
DNS	GT1	5	(United Kingdom) David Price Racing	(Australia) David Brabham (United Kingdom) Perry McCarthy	Ford (Roush) 6.0L V8	**G**	–
DNS	GT2	71	(Austria) GT Racing Team	(Italy) Luigino Pagatto (Italy) Luca Drudi	Porsche 911 GT2	?	–
DNS	GT2	71	(Austria) GT Racing Team	(Italy) Luigino Pagatto (Italy) Luca Drudi	Porsche 3.6L Turbo Flat-6	?	–

== Statistics ==
- Pole Position – #11 AMG-Mercedes – 1:59.099
- Fastest Lap – #8 BMW Motorsport – 2:01.711
- Average Speed – 191.756 km/h
- Distance – 770.999 km

FIA GT Championship
Previous race: None	1997 season	Next race: 1997 FIA GT Silverstone 4 Hours
