= Mercedes-Benz CLK GTR =

German Grand Touring race car

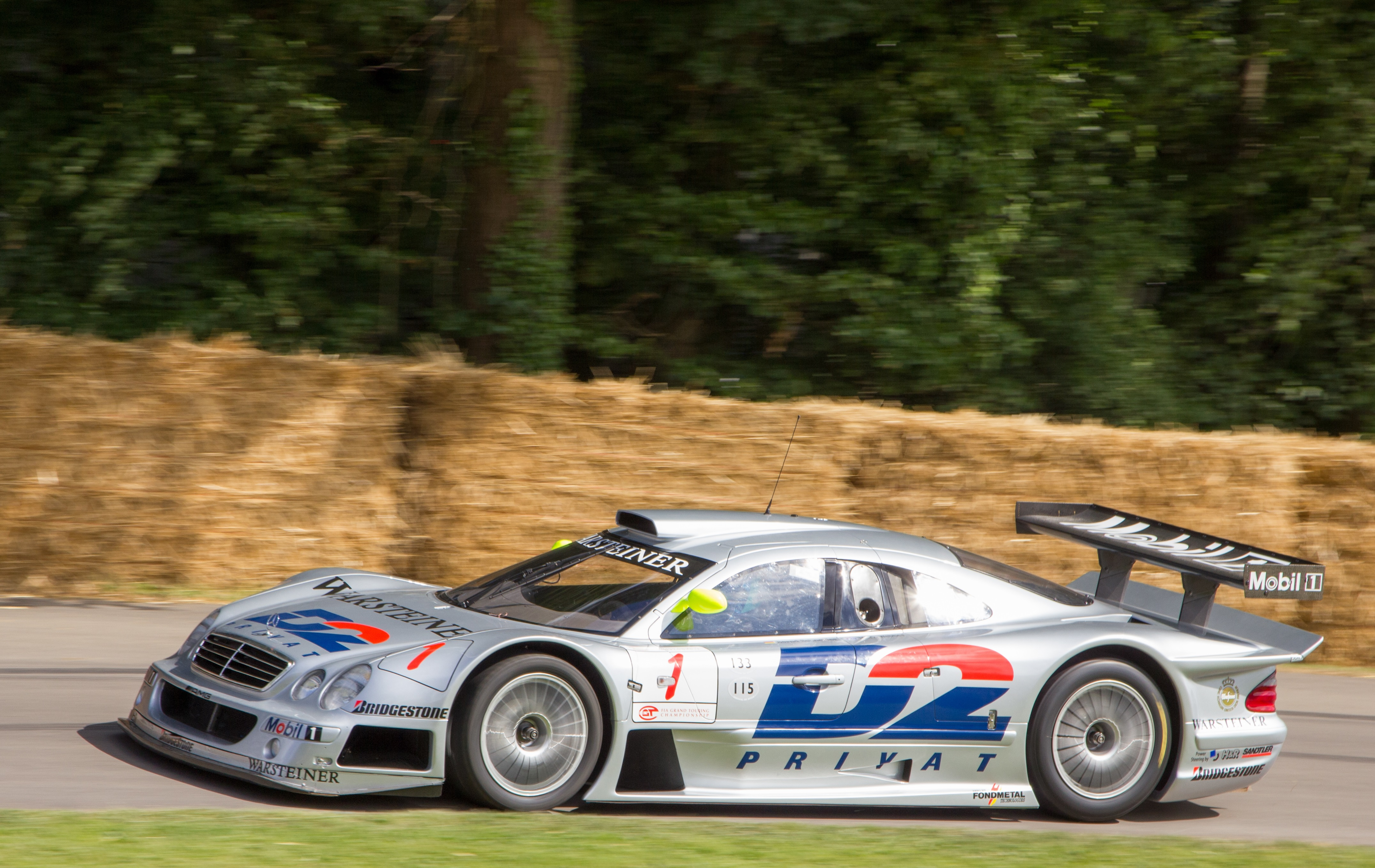
- The CLK GTR at the 2014 Goodwood Festival of Speed
- Category: GT1
- Constructor: Mercedes-Benz
- Designer: Gerhard Ungar
- Successor: Mercedes-Benz CLK LM

Technical specifications
- Chassis: Carbon fibre and aluminium honeycomb monocoque
- Suspension: Double wishbone suspension with pull-rod actuated coil springs over dampers
- Length: 4,855 mm (191.1 in)
- Width: 1,950 mm (76.8 in)
- Height: 1,100 mm (43.3 in)
- Axle track: 1,610 mm (63 in) (front); 1,650 mm (65 in) (rear)
- Wheelbase: 2,670 mm (105.1 in)
- Engine: Mercedes-Benz LS600 (GT112) 5,987 cc (365.3 cu in) V12 naturally aspirated mid-engined
- Transmission: 6-speed sequential manual
- Weight: 1,000 kg (2,205 lb)
- Fuel: Mobil 96-octane petrol
- Lubricants: Mobil 1
- Brakes: Carbon-composite
- Tyres: Bridgestone
- Clutch: Four-plate carbon fibre

Competition history
- Notable entrants: AMG; Persson Motorsport
- Notable drivers: List of drivers: (Germany) Bernd Mayländer; (Germany) Bernd Schneider; (Germany) Klaus Ludwig; (Germany) Marcel Tiemann; (Germany) Ralf Schumacher; (France) Jean-Marc Gounon; (France) Christophe Bouchut; (Italy) Alessandro Nannini; (Austria) Alexander Wurz; (Australia) Mark Webber; (Japan) Aguri Suzuki; (Brazil) Ricardo Zonta; (Canada) Greg Moore
- Debut: 1997 FIA GT Hockenheim 4 Hours
- First win: 1997 Suzuka 1000 km
- Last win: 1998 FIA GT Silverstone 500 km
- Last event: 1998 FIA GT Laguna Seca 500 km
| Races | Wins | Poles | F/Laps |
|---|---|---|---|
| 13 | 8 | 8 | 7 |
- Teams' Championships: 2 (1997 FIA GT, 1998 FIA GT)
- Drivers' Championships: 2 (1997 FIA GT, 1998 FIA GT)

The Mercedes-Benz CLK GTR is a GT1 sports car built and produced by Mercedes-Benz in conjunction with their then motorsport partner AMG. Intended for racing in the new FIA GT Championship series in 1997, the CLK GTR was designed primarily as a race car. As such, the production of road cars necessary in order to meet homologation standards of GT1 was a secondary consideration in the car's design, i.e. the CLK GTR was a homologation special.

After its successful campaign in the 1997 FIA GT Championship, the car was also entered in the first two rounds of the 1998 FIA GT Championship where it won them both before being replaced for the 1998 24 Hours of Le Mans. Its successor, the 1998 Mercedes-Benz CLK LM, concluded Mercedes' GT1 program. For 1999, Mercedes introduced the Mercedes-Benz CLR, a sports car built to the Le Mans Grand Touring Prototype (LMGTP) regulations. This sports car was a purpose-built racecar that did not have to abide by the homologation rules of the previous GT1 cars.

== Background ==
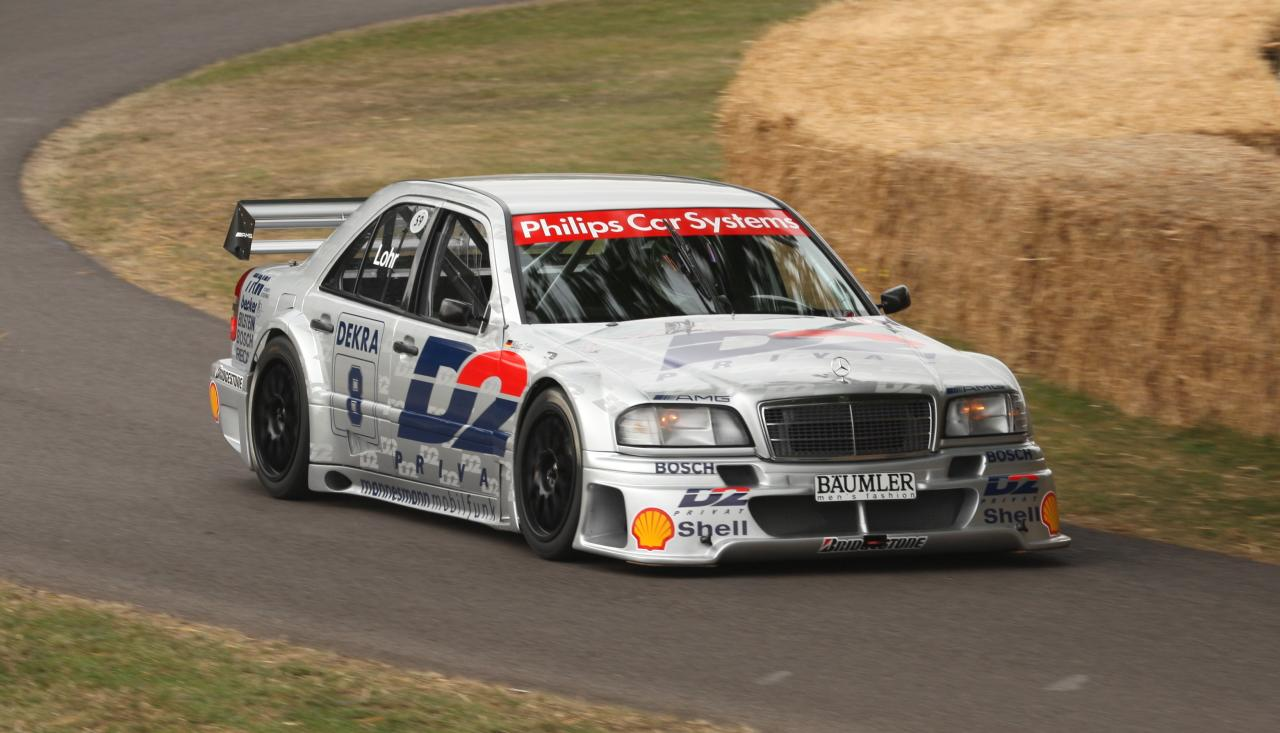
The Mercedes-AMG DTM W202 C-Class

Following the 1955 Le Mans disaster, Mercedes-Benz had withdrawn its factory-backed race team from all motorsport activities. It was not until 1985 that Mercedes reintroduced itself to motorsport, entering the 1985 World Sportscar Championship. Starting off as an engine supplier to Sauber, this partnership bloomed into a full-time factory-backed effort. Despite Mercedes winning the World Sportscar Championship twice in 1989 and 1990, they eventually withdrew at the end of 1991 following disappointing results.

However, Mercedes saw success elsewhere, with a burgeoning touring car program in the Deutsche Tourenwagen Meisterschaft, where the 190 E and its Evolution I and II siblings were climbing up the ranks. The 1991 season would see the 190 E Evo II take the honours in the constructors' championship. Klaus Ludwig piloted the car to the 1992 drivers' championship, with the 190 E being replaced by the W202 C-Class following the conclusion of the 1993 season. The C-Class went on to dominate both drivers and constructors championships from 1994 to 1996; as a result of the domination the Deutsche Tourenwagen Meisterschaft/International Touring Car Championship folded in late 1996, with both remaining competitors Opel and Alfa Romeo withdrawing due to the rising costs.

Mercedes-Benz saw an opportunity to go against manufacturers such as Porsche and McLaren at the BPR Global GT Series, which became an FIA-sanctioned championship, the FIA GT Championship. The McLaren F1 GTR was the dominant car in this series, and in order to defeat it, German marque Porsche built the 911 GT1 as a dedicated racecar. It became the first of the manufacturer's "homologation specials", with Norbert Singer modifying a Porsche 962 chassis to accommodate the front fascia of a Porsche 993, leaving other things such as the suspension and engine largely intact. Only two units of the 993-based 911 GT1 were actually completed by the end of 1996.

For the 1997 season, AMG was tasked by Mercedes-Benz with creating a car akin to the 911 GT1, an almost purebred racing machine with a resemblance to a road car. The CLK GTR was the result, sharing nothing mechanically except the headlights, rear taillights and grille with the road-going Mercedes-Benz CLK.

The CLK GTR was developed in a mere 128 days, this development time hastened by the purchase of McLaren F1 GTR chassis #11R from then-reigning FIA GT Championship champions Larbre Compétition. The car served as AMG's mule, the F1's bodywork was replaced by AMG's own, and the BMW S70 engine replaced by Mercedes' own powerplant, a M120 V12. The car was eventually restored to its original mechanical condition, and was auctioned off in Monaco in 2000 by RM Sotheby's.

== Specifications ==
The chassis of the CLK GTR was a carbon-fibre monocoque mated to an aluminium honeycomb frame, constructed by Lola Composites, a division of Lola Cars.

The engine was a derivative of the M120 engine found in the R129 SL-Class and W140 S-Class, retitled the LS600, or GT 112. The bore and stroke were kept the same at 89 mm (3.5 in) and 80.2 mm (3.2 in), however, the connecting rods were manufactured from titanium, and the compression ratio was increased from 10.0:1 to 12.0:1. These modifications boosted power to 441 kW (600 PS) at 7,000 rpm, and torque to 700 N⋅m (516 lb⋅ft) at 3,900 rpm, allowing the car to reach a top speed of 330 km/h (205 mph). The engine (which also served as a stressed member) was mounted amidships behind the driver, with power being sent to the rear wheels via a 6-speed sequential manual transmission.

The CLK GTR had a 0–100 km/h (0–62 mph) time of 3.8 seconds. Several driving aids such as traction control, ABS, active suspension, drive by wire throttle control, were banned, with fore-aft brake bias the only aid allowed. The front and rear suspension were identical, consisting of double wishbones, with pull-rod actuated coil springs with adjustable shocks.

== Racing history ==
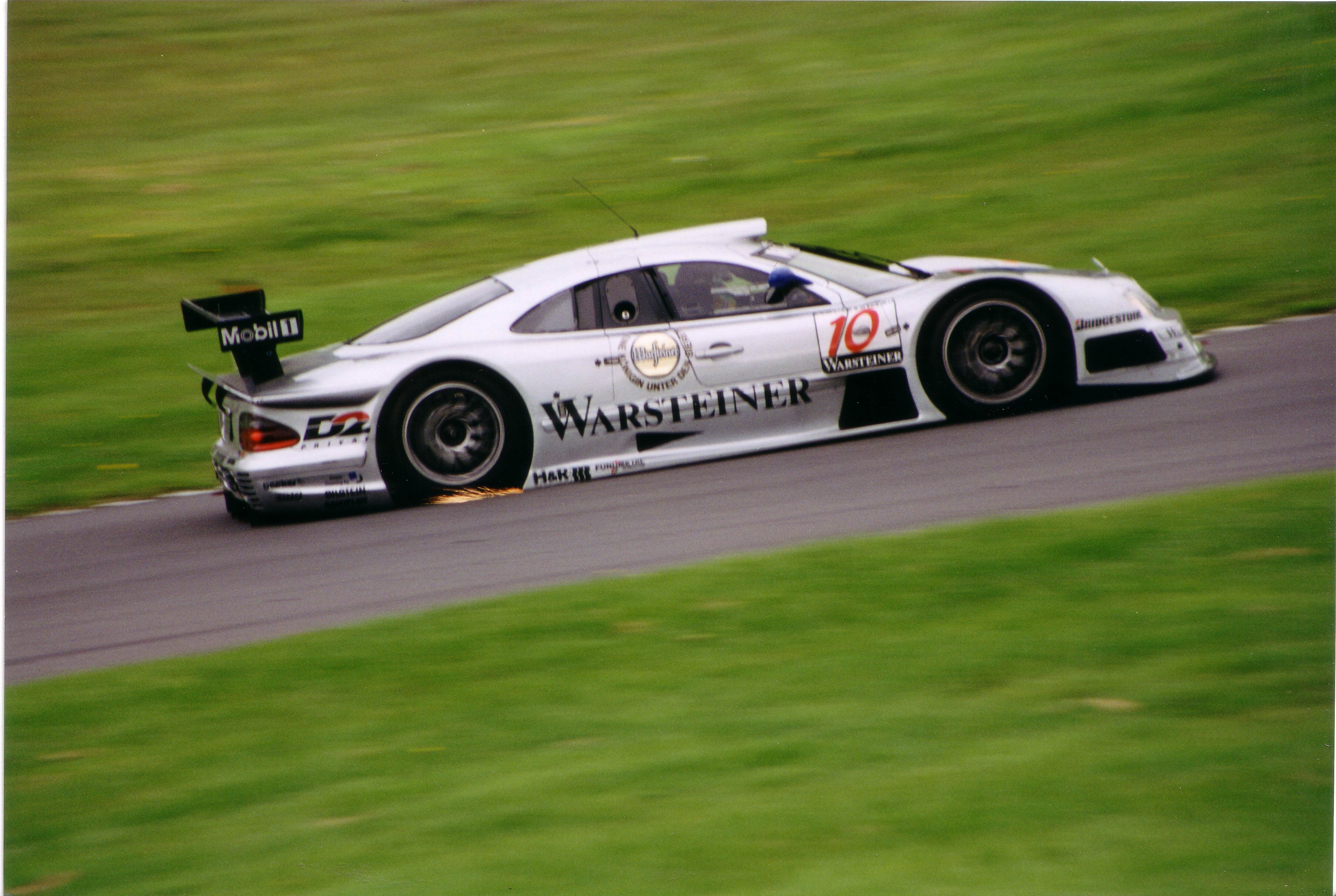
The No. 10 CLK GTR at the 1997 FIA GT Donington 4 Hours

The CLK GTR debuted at Mercedes' home track, the Hockenheimring, at the 1997 FIA GT Hockenheim 4 Hours. Bernd Schneider qualified on pole and took the fastest lap, but had to retire due to braking problems. The sister No. 10 CLK GTR only mustered a 27th-place finish, also battling mechanical woes. Still, the pace of the car was promising, and after intense development over the summer break, Mercedes would score their first 1–2 finish at the 1997 FIA GT Nürburgring 4 Hours with Schneider and Klaus Ludwig taking the win.

The rest of the season saw the CLK GTR take three more 1–2 finishes, and wins at the 1997 FIA GT Sebring 3 Hours and 1997 FIA GT Laguna Seca 3 Hours would secure Mercedes the constructors' and drivers' championship with Schneider in their maiden season. Mercedes opted not to enter that year's 24 Hours of Le Mans, as AMG understood that the V12 in the CLK GTR was better tailored to the 4-hour sprints of the FIA GT Championship rather than the 24-hour gruel of the Circuit de la Sarthe. Instead, Mercedes and AMG decided to develop a bespoke car for next year's 24 Hours of Le Mans, an evolution of the CLK GTR dubbed the CLK LM, LM for Le Mans.

== Straßenversion ==
Mercedes-Benz CLK GTR Straßenversion
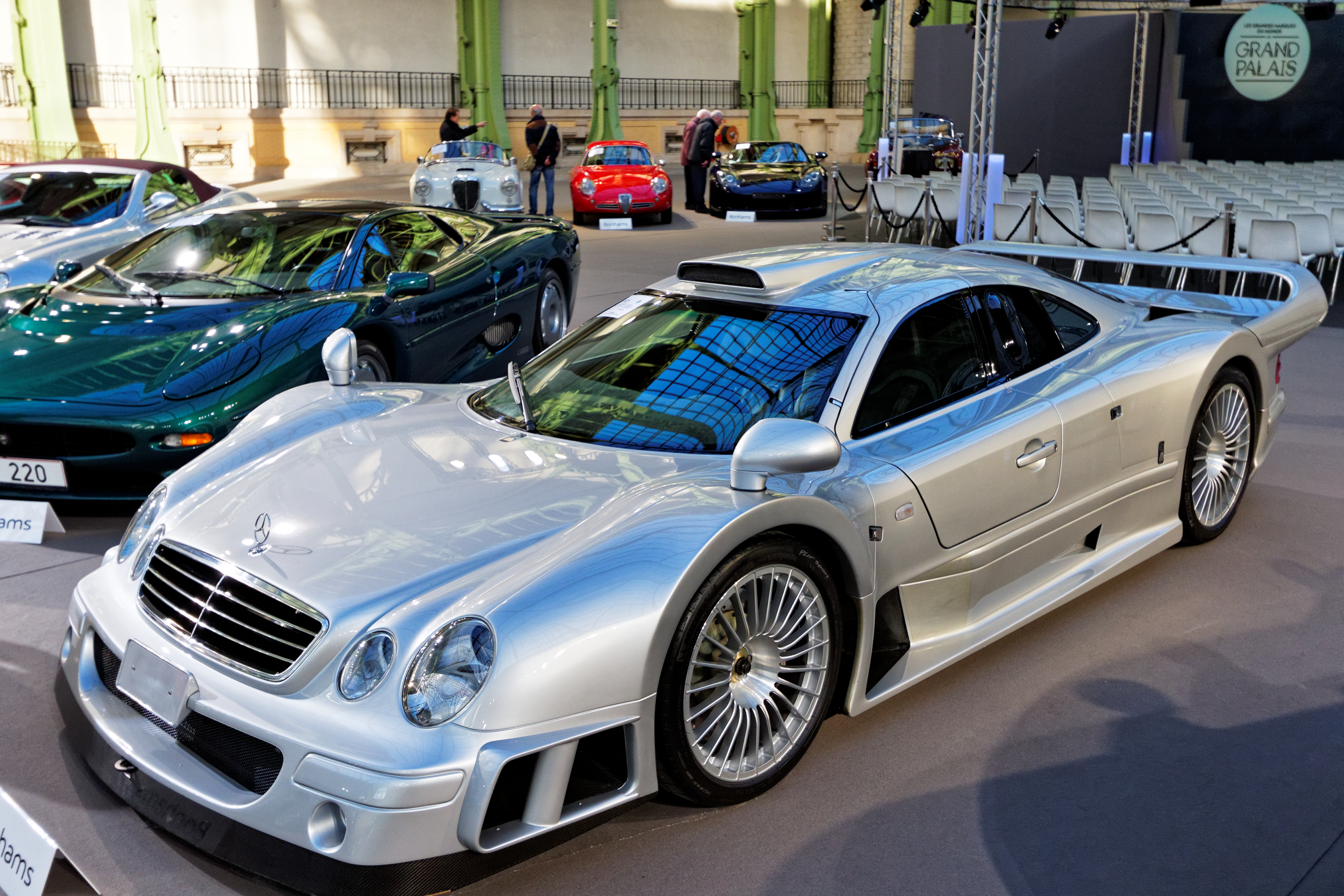
- The CLK GTR Straßenversion at the Grand Palais in 2010

Overview
- Manufacturer: Mercedes-AMG, with HWA AG
- Production: 1998–1999 (28 produced); 2 prototypes; 20 coupés; 6 roadsters
- Assembly: Affalterbach, Germany

Body and chassis
- Class: Sports car (S)
- Body style: 2-door coupé 2-door roadster
- Layout: Rear mid-engine, rear-wheel-drive
- Doors: Dihedral

Powertrain
- Engine: 6,898 / 7,291 cc (420.9 / 444.9 cu in) M297 E69/E73 V12
- Power output: Coupé: 631 PS (464 kW; 622 hp), 731 N⋅m (539 lbf⋅ft); Roadster: 612 PS (450 kW; 604 hp), 775 N⋅m (572 lbf⋅ft); SuperSport: 664 PS (488 kW; 655 hp), 786 N⋅m (580 lbf⋅ft)
- Transmission: 6-speed sequential manual transmission

Dimensions
- Wheelbase: 2,670 mm (105.1 in)
- Length: 4,854 mm (191.1 in)
- Width: 1,951 mm (76.8 in)
- Height: 1,164 mm (45.8 in); 1,100 mm (43.3 in) (roadster)
- Kerb weight: 1,440 kg (3,175 lb); 1,410 kg (3,109 lb) (roadster)

Chronology
- Predecessor: Mercedes-Benz C112 (spiritual)
- Successor: Mercedes-Benz CLK LM Straßenversion

The road-legal homologated version of the CLK-GTR would simply gain the suffix Straßenversion, German for "Street version". Many components of the road car were lifted directly from the racecar, including the suspension, the sequential transmission, and the carbon-fibre monocoque.

In a similar fashion to the Porsche 911 GT1 in 1996, only a singular road car was completed in 1997 and was shown in that year's Frankfurt Motor Show. The rest of the road cars were built at Affalterbach by AMG in collaboration with HWA over 1998, and production ceased in mid-1999. Of the 28 units produced, 2 were prototypes, 6 were roadsters, and 20 were coupés, 2 of which left the factory in "SuperSport" specification. Two cars, one coupé and one roadster, also left the factory as right-hand drive for the 29th Sultan of Brunei, Hassanal Bolkiah.

Former racing driver and motoring journalist Paul Frère test drove the CLK GTR around the Hockenheimring. Writing for Road & Track magazine, he praised the car's tractability, despite its immense power. He also applauded the effort put in by Mercedes-Benz to make the car more user-friendly, including large amounts of soundproofing to reduce the mechanical noise from the transmission and engine. Frère critiqued the cramped cockpit space despite the large width of the car, and its driveability in city conditions, due to its non-synchronous transmission and large amount of torque available from low rpm. He ended his review describing the car as a "real work of art".

=== Specifications ===
The engine was stroked out to 6,898 cc (420.9 cu in) by Ilmor, resulting in a power and torque bump to 622 hp (464 kW; 631 PS) at 6,500 rpm and 731 N⋅m (539 lb⋅ft) at 5,250 rpm. Sending this power to the rear wheels was a 6-speed sequential manual transmission with a four-plate carbon fibre clutch. This gave the GTR a 0–100 km/h (0–62 mph) of 3.8 seconds, and a claimed top speed of over 320 km/h (199 mph), depending on gearing.

The 18-inch centrelocking wheels were fitted with 295/35 ZR18 Bridgestone tyres at the front and 345/35 ZR18 at the rear. Stopping power was provided by 6-piston calipers and carbon-composite rotors measuring 380 mm (15.0 in) at the front and 335 mm (13.2 in) at the rear, with an anti-lock braking system.

The road car received several amenities such as air-conditioning and an audio system. Bins for luggage were located under each door, as was the control for the fire suppression system on the driver side. Owners had the option of fitting their seats with tartan, leather, or Alcantara, with four-point harnesses for safety.

Like the race car, the CLK GTR only shared the headlights, taillights and grille with the roadgoing CLK, and many exterior design elements such as the roof-mounted air dams, and NACA ducts on the sills were retained. Mercedes decided not to modify the CLK GTR to comply with United States safety regulations, and all examples imported to the U.S. were under Show or Display exemptions.

=== Roadster ===
When the first production run of 20 CLK GTR coupés ended in 1999, one roadster was also produced and held onto by AMG until 2002, when it was purchased by Mark Johnston. Johnston attempted to sue DaimlerChrysler in 2006, claiming that when he had taken it for a test drive with a customer, the oil gauge lit up and the transmission promptly failed. The next five would be converted from coupés to roadsters based on existing GTR chassis by HWA, and were made available in 2006.

Modifications to the coupé included moving the engine intake from the roof to the sides, door-mounted mirrors, an integrated rollbar behind the seats, a revised front grille and rear wing which resembled the fixed rear wing of the race cars. Of the six roadsters built, one was painted black and sold in 2015 by Bonhams, and now resides at Dutton Garage in Melbourne. Another was painted dark silver with a purple interior, for the Sultan of Brunei, and was sold to Indian businessman Vijay Mallya in 2009. The chassis is the only right-hand-drive example.

In November 2025, a CLK GTR Roadster (chassis no. 5) owned by Ryan Wedding was seized by Federal Bureau of Investigation as part of the Giant Slalom investigative.

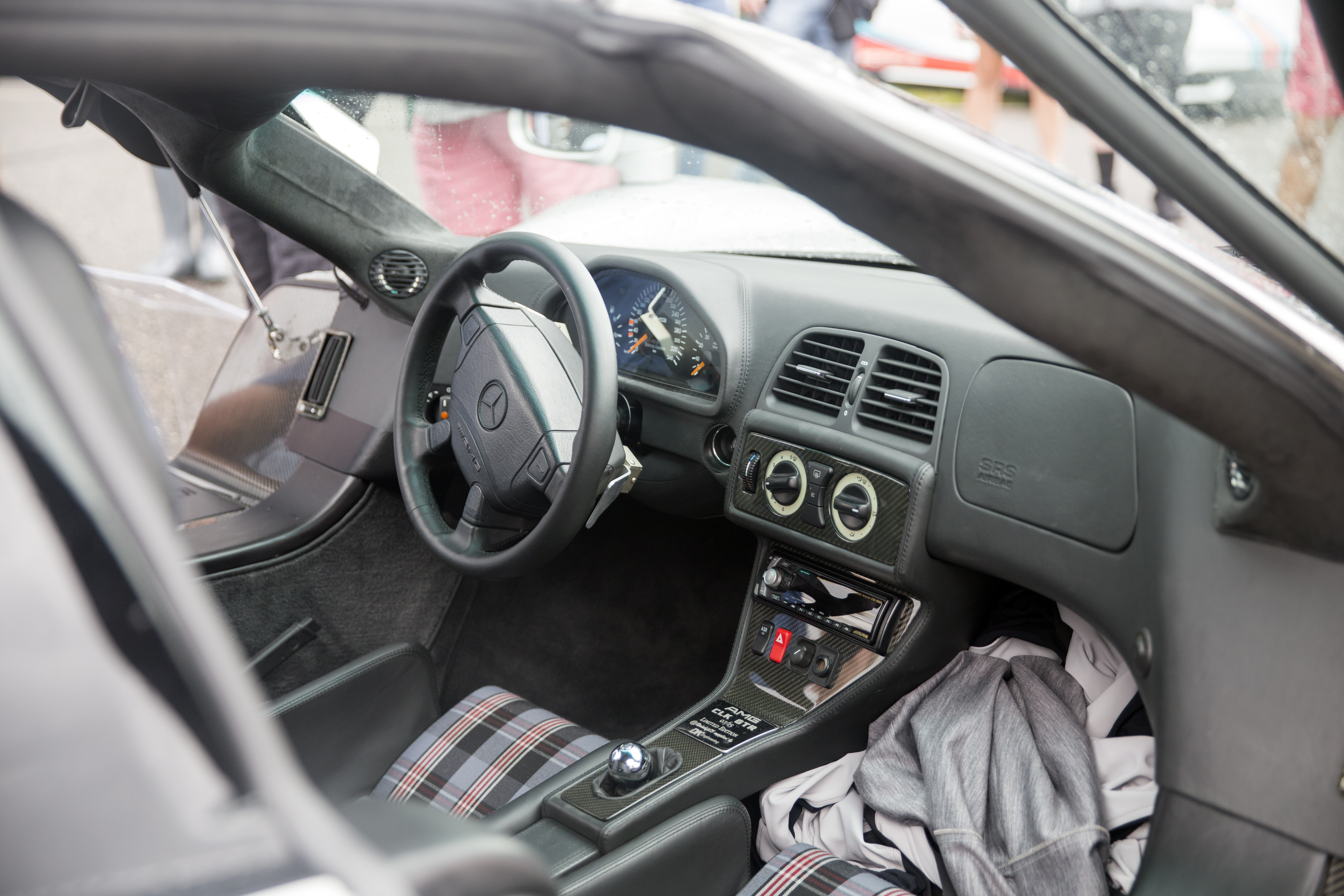
Interior

=== SuperSport ===
Two chassis would also leave the AMG factory in SuperSport specification. The original 6,898 cc (420.9 cu in) E69 engine was superseded with the larger, more powerful 7,291 cc (444.9 cu in) E73 M297. This same engine was also found in the Pagani Zonda and Mercedes-Benz R129, albeit now producing 664 PS (488 kW; 655 hp) at 6,500 rpm and 786 N⋅m (580 lb⋅ft) at 5,250 rpm.

Visual changes included a speedometer that was etched to 400 km/h (249 mph) and a redesigned front splitter. The increased power and torque figures lowered the 0–100 km/h (0–62 mph) to 3.5 seconds. Three other chassis later received the E73 engine and SuperSport package, with the later models having higher power figures at 711 hp (721 PS; 530 kW).

=== Legacy ===
At the time of manufacture, Guinness World Records named the CLK Straßenversion and its siblings the world's most expensive production car, retailing for US$1,547,620 ($2,572,940 in 2021). This record stood until the introduction of the Ferrari FXX-K in 2015.

Along with its GT1 siblings, the Porsche 911 GT1 and McLaren F1 GTR, the trio were known as the "holy trinity" of Group GT1, and formed what several publications deemed a "golden era" or "pinnacle" of 90s sportscar racing.

== Racing results ==
=== Complete FIA GT Championship results ===
| Year | Entrant | Class | Drivers | No. | Rds. | Rounds | | | | | | | | | | | Pts. | Pos. |
| Year | Entrant | Class | Drivers | No. | Rds. | 1 | 2 | 3 | 4 | 5 | 6 | 7 | 8 | 9 | 10 | 11 | Pts. | Pos. |
|---|---|---|---|---|---|---|---|---|---|---|---|---|---|---|---|---|---|---|
| 1997 | (Germany) Team AMG-Mercedes | GT1 | (Italy) Alessandro Nannini (Germany) Marcel Tiemann (Germany) Klaus Ludwig (Germany) Bernd Schneider | 10 | 1–10; 1–2, 4–10; 3; 7 | HOC; 13 | SIL; 13 | HEL; 11 | NÜR; 2 | SPA; 11 | **ZEL**; 2 | SUZ; 1 | DON; 2 | MUG; 2 | SEB; Ret | LAG; 8 | 110 | 1st |
| 1997 | (Germany) Team AMG-Mercedes | GT1 | (Germany) Bernd Schneider (Austria) Alexander Wurz (Germany) Klaus Ludwig (Japan) Aguri Suzuki | 11 | 1–11; 1–3, 5–9; 4, 10–11; 7 | **HOC**; Ret | **SIL**; 2 | HEL; 8 | **NÜR**; 1 | SPA; 2 | ZEL; 4 | SUZ; 7 | **DON**; 1 | **MUG**; Ret | SEB; 1 | LAG; 1 | 110 | 1st |
| 1997 | (Germany) Team AMG-Mercedes | GT1 | (Germany) Klaus Ludwig (Germany) Bernd Mayländer (Germany) Ralf Schumacher (Austria) Alexander Wurz (Canada) Greg Moore | 12 | 4–9; 4, 6–9; 5; 10–11; 10–11 | | | | NÜR; Ret | SPA; 5 | ZEL; 1 | **SUZ**; 2 | DON; 4 | MUG; 9 | SEB; 7 | **LAG**; 7 | 110 | 1st |
| 1998 | (Germany) Team AMG-Mercedes | GT1 | (Germany) Bernd Schneider (Australia) Mark Webber | 1 | All; All | OSC; 3 | SIL; 1 | | | | | | | | | | 146 | 1st |
| 1998 | (Germany) Team AMG-Mercedes | GT1 | (Brazil) Ricardo Zonta (Germany) Klaus Ludwig | 2 | All; All | OSC; 1 | SIL; 4 | | | | | | | | | | 146 | 1st |
| 1998 | (Germany) Team Persson Motorsport | GT1 | (France) Christophe Bouchut (Germany) Bernd Mayländer | 11 | All; All | OSC; Ret | SIL; 7 | HOC; 10 | DIJ; 4 | HUN; DNS | SUZ; 4 | DON; 8 | A1R; 10 | HOM; Ret | LAG; 6 | | 24 | 3rd |
| 1998 | (Germany) Team Persson Motorsport | GT1 | (Germany) Marcel Tiemann (France) Jean-Marc Gounon | 12 | All; All | OSC; 2 | SIL; Ret | HOC; 4 | DIJ; 5 | HUN; Ret | SUZ; 7 | DON; 5 | A1R; 5 | HOM; 5 | LAG; 7 | | 24 | 3rd |

| Colour | Result |
|---|---|
| Gold | Winner |
| Silver | Second place |
| Bronze | Third place |
| Green | Points classification |
| Blue | Non-points classification |
| Blue | Non-classified finish (NC) |
| Purple | Retired, not classified (Ret) |
| Red | Did not qualify (DNQ) |
| Red | Did not pre-qualify (DNPQ) |
| Black | Disqualified (DSQ) |
| White | Did not start (DNS) |
| White | Withdrew (WD) |
| White | Race cancelled (C) |
| Blank | Did not practice (DNP) |
| Blank | Did not arrive (DNA) |
| Blank | Excluded (EX) |

**Bold** – Pole position
Italics – Fastest lap

== See also ==
- Mercedes-Benz in motorsport
