= 1997 FIA GT Laguna Seca 3 Hours =

Layout of the Laguna Seca Raceway

The 1997 FIA GT Laguna Seca 3 Hours was the eleventh and final race of the 1997 FIA GT Championship season. It was run at Laguna Seca Raceway, United States on October 26, 1997.

== Official results ==
Class winners in bold. Cars failing to complete 75% of winner's distance marked as Not Classified (NC).

Pos	Class	No	Team	Drivers	Chassis	Tyre	Laps
Pos	Class	No	Team	Drivers	Engine	Tyre	Laps
1	**GT1**	**11**	**(Germany) AMG-Mercedes**	**(Germany) Bernd Schneider (Germany) Klaus Ludwig**	**Mercedes-Benz CLK GTR**	**B**	**130**
1	**GT1**	**11**	**(Germany) AMG-Mercedes**	**(Germany) Bernd Schneider (Germany) Klaus Ludwig**	**Mercedes-Benz LS600 6.0L V12**	**B**	**130**
2	GT1	7	(Germany) Porsche AG	(France) Bob Wollek (France) Yannick Dalmas	Porsche 911 GT1 Evo	**MI**	130
2	GT1	7	(Germany) Porsche AG	(France) Bob Wollek (France) Yannick Dalmas	Porsche 3.2L Turbo Flat-6	**MI**	130
3	GT1	47	(Germany) Porsche AG	(United Kingdom) Allan McNish (Germany) Ralf Kelleners	Porsche 911 GT1 Evo	**MI**	130
3	GT1	47	(Germany) Porsche AG	(United Kingdom) Allan McNish (Germany) Ralf Kelleners	Porsche 3.2L Turbo Flat-6	**MI**	130
4	GT1	3	(United Kingdom) Gulf Team Davidoff (United Kingdom) GTC Racing	(France) Pierre-Henri Raphanel (France) Jean-Marc Gounon	McLaren F1 GTR	**MI**	130
4	GT1	3	(United Kingdom) Gulf Team Davidoff (United Kingdom) GTC Racing	(France) Pierre-Henri Raphanel (France) Jean-Marc Gounon	BMW S70 6.0L V12	**MI**	130
5	GT1	6	(Germany) Porsche AG	(Belgium) Thierry Boutsen (Germany) Hans Joachim Stuck	Porsche 911 GT1 Evo	**MI**	129
5	GT1	6	(Germany) Porsche AG	(Belgium) Thierry Boutsen (Germany) Hans Joachim Stuck	Porsche 3.2L Turbo Flat-6	**MI**	129
6	GT1	1	(United Kingdom) Gulf Team Davidoff (United Kingdom) GTC Racing	(United Kingdom) Geoff Lees (Sweden) Anders Olofsson	McLaren F1 GTR	**MI**	128
6	GT1	1	(United Kingdom) Gulf Team Davidoff (United Kingdom) GTC Racing	(United Kingdom) Geoff Lees (Sweden) Anders Olofsson	BMW S70 6.0L V12	**MI**	128
7	GT1	12	(Germany) AMG-Mercedes	(Austria) Alexander Wurz (Canada) Greg Moore	Mercedes-Benz CLK GTR	**B**	127
7	GT1	12	(Germany) AMG-Mercedes	(Austria) Alexander Wurz (Canada) Greg Moore	Mercedes-Benz LS600 6.0L V12	**B**	127
8	GT1	10	(Germany) AMG-Mercedes	(Germany) Marcel Tiemann (Italy) Alessandro Nannini	Mercedes-Benz CLK GTR	**B**	127
8	GT1	10	(Germany) AMG-Mercedes	(Germany) Marcel Tiemann (Italy) Alessandro Nannini	Mercedes-Benz LS600 6.0L V12	**B**	127
9	GT1	14	(United Kingdom) GT1 Lotus Racing	(Netherlands) Jan Lammers (Netherlands) Mike Hezemans (Italy) Max Angelelli	Lotus Elise GT1	**MI**	127
9	GT1	14	(United Kingdom) GT1 Lotus Racing	(Netherlands) Jan Lammers (Netherlands) Mike Hezemans (Italy) Max Angelelli	Chevrolet 6.0L V8	**MI**	127
10	GT1	2	(United Kingdom) Gulf Team Davidoff (United Kingdom) GTC Racing	(Denmark) John Nielsen (Germany) Thomas Bscher	McLaren F1 GTR	**MI**	127
10	GT1	2	(United Kingdom) Gulf Team Davidoff (United Kingdom) GTC Racing	(Denmark) John Nielsen (Germany) Thomas Bscher	BMW S70 6.0L V12	**MI**	127
11	GT1	8	(Germany) BMW Motorsport (Germany) Schnitzer Motorsport	(Italy) Roberto Ravaglia (United Kingdom) Steve Soper	McLaren F1 GTR	**MI**	125
11	GT1	8	(Germany) BMW Motorsport (Germany) Schnitzer Motorsport	(Italy) Roberto Ravaglia (United Kingdom) Steve Soper	BMW S70 6.0L V12	**MI**	125
12	GT1	30	(United Kingdom) G-Force Strandell	(United Kingdom) Geoff Lister (United Kingdom) John Greasley (Sweden) Magnus Wallinder	Porsche 911 GT1	**D**	124
12	GT1	30	(United Kingdom) G-Force Strandell	(United Kingdom) Geoff Lister (United Kingdom) John Greasley (Sweden) Magnus Wallinder	Porsche 3.2L Turbo Flat-6	**D**	124
13	GT1	17	(France) JB Racing	(France) Emmanuel Collard (Italy) Mauro Baldi	Porsche 911 GT1 Evo	**MI**	123
13	GT1	17	(France) JB Racing	(France) Emmanuel Collard (Italy) Mauro Baldi	Porsche 3.2L Turbo Flat-6	**MI**	123
14	**GT2**	**56**	**(Germany) Roock Racing**	**(Switzerland) Bruno Eichmann (France) Stéphane Ortelli**	**Porsche 911 GT2**	**MI**	**121**
14	**GT2**	**56**	**(Germany) Roock Racing**	**(Switzerland) Bruno Eichmann (France) Stéphane Ortelli**	**Porsche 3.6L Turbo Flat-6**	**MI**	**121**
15	GT2	52	(France) Viper Team Oreca	(United Kingdom) Justin Bell (United States) Tommy Archer	Chrysler Viper GTS-R	**MI**	120
15	GT2	52	(France) Viper Team Oreca	(United Kingdom) Justin Bell (United States) Tommy Archer	Chrysler 8.0L V10	**MI**	120
16	GT2	51	(France) Viper Team Oreca	(Monaco) Olivier Beretta (France) Philippe Gache	Chrysler Viper GTS-R	**MI**	120
16	GT2	51	(France) Viper Team Oreca	(Monaco) Olivier Beretta (France) Philippe Gache	Chrysler 8.0L V10	**MI**	120
17	GT2	54	(United Kingdom) Chamberlain Engineering	(Republic of Ireland) Tim O'Kennedy (United Kingdom) Richard Dean	Chrysler Viper GTS-R	**G**	116
17	GT2	54	(United Kingdom) Chamberlain Engineering	(Republic of Ireland) Tim O'Kennedy (United Kingdom) Richard Dean	Chrysler 8.0L V10	**G**	116
18	GT2	63	(Germany) Krauss Motorsport	(Germany) Michael Trunk (Germany) Bernhard Müller	Porsche 911 GT2	**P**	115
18	GT2	63	(Germany) Krauss Motorsport	(Germany) Michael Trunk (Germany) Bernhard Müller	Porsche 3.6L Turbo Flat-6	**P**	115
19	GT2	70	(Germany) Dellenbach Motorsport	(Germany) Klaus Horn (Germany) Rainer Bonnetmsüller	Porsche 911 GT2	**D**	115
19	GT2	70	(Germany) Dellenbach Motorsport	(Germany) Klaus Horn (Germany) Rainer Bonnetmsüller	Porsche 3.6L Turbo Flat-6	**D**	115
20	GT2	58	(France) Estoril Racing Team	(France) Michel Monteiro (Portugal) Manuel Monteiro	Porsche 911 GT2	?	114
20	GT2	58	(France) Estoril Racing Team	(France) Michel Monteiro (Portugal) Manuel Monteiro	Porsche 3.6L Turbo Flat-6	?	114
21	GT2	53	(United Kingdom) Chamberlain Engineering	(United States) Tim Moser (United States) Shane Lewis (France) Patrick Vuillaume	Chrysler Viper GTS-R	**G**	114
21	GT2	53	(United Kingdom) Chamberlain Engineering	(United States) Tim Moser (United States) Shane Lewis (France) Patrick Vuillaume	Chrysler 8.0L V10	**G**	114
22	GT2	97	(United States) GMB Motorsports	(United States) Cort Wagner (United States) Dirk Layer (United States) Kelly Collins	Porsche 911 GT2	?	113
22	GT2	97	(United States) GMB Motorsports	(United States) Cort Wagner (United States) Dirk Layer (United States) Kelly Collins	Porsche 3.6L Turbo Flat-6	?	113
23	GT2	72	(Switzerland) Elf Haberthur Racing	(Belgium) Michel Neugarten (Belgium) Stéphane de Groodt	Porsche 911 GT2	**D**	108
23	GT2	72	(Switzerland) Elf Haberthur Racing	(Belgium) Michel Neugarten (Belgium) Stéphane de Groodt	Porsche 3.6L Turbo Flat-6	**D**	108
24 DNF	GT2	77	(United States) Saleen-Allen Speedlab (United Kingdom) Cirtek Motorsport	(United Kingdom) Robert Schirle (United Kingdom) Christian Vann	Saleen Mustang RRR	**D**	107
24 DNF	GT2	77	(United States) Saleen-Allen Speedlab (United Kingdom) Cirtek Motorsport	(United Kingdom) Robert Schirle (United Kingdom) Christian Vann	Ford 5.9L V8	**D**	107
25	GT2	60	(Netherlands) Marcos Racing International	(New Zealand) Rob Wilson (Netherlands) Martijn Koene	Marcos LM600	**D**	106
25	GT2	60	(Netherlands) Marcos Racing International	(New Zealand) Rob Wilson (Netherlands) Martijn Koene	Chevrolet 5.9L V8	**D**	106
26 DNF	GT2	57	(Germany) Roock Racing	(Germany) Uwe Alzen (Germany) Claudia Hürtgen	Porsche 911 GT2	**MI**	66
26 DNF	GT2	57	(Germany) Roock Racing	(Germany) Uwe Alzen (Germany) Claudia Hürtgen	Porsche 3.6L Turbo Flat-6	**MI**	66
27 DNF	GT1	29	(United Kingdom) Newcastle United Lister	(United Kingdom) Julian Bailey (Belgium) Eric van de Poele	Lister Storm GTL	**D**	103
27 DNF	GT1	29	(United Kingdom) Newcastle United Lister	(United Kingdom) Julian Bailey (Belgium) Eric van de Poele	Jaguar 7.0L V12	**D**	103
28	GT2	69	(Germany) Proton Competition	(Germany) Gerold Ried (Austria) Manfred Jurasz	Porsche 911 GT2	**P**	98
28	GT2	69	(Germany) Proton Competition	(Germany) Gerold Ried (Austria) Manfred Jurasz	Porsche 3.6L Turbo Flat-6	**P**	98
29 DNF	GT2	62	(Switzerland) Stadler Motorsport	(Switzerland) Uwe Sick (Switzerland) Denis Lay	Porsche 911 GT2	**P**	96
29 DNF	GT2	62	(Switzerland) Stadler Motorsport	(Switzerland) Uwe Sick (Switzerland) Denis Lay	Porsche 3.6L Turbo Flat-6	**P**	96
30 DNF	GT2	87	(Germany) Roock Racing	(United Kingdom) Hugh Price (United Kingdom) John Robinson (Germany) André Ahrlé	Porsche 911 GT2	**MI**	91
30 DNF	GT2	87	(Germany) Roock Racing	(United Kingdom) Hugh Price (United Kingdom) John Robinson (Germany) André Ahrlé	Porsche 3.6L Turbo Flat-6	**MI**	91
31 DNF	GT1	27	(United Kingdom) Parabolica Motorsport	(United Kingdom) Gary Ayles (United Kingdom) Chris Goodwin	McLaren F1 GTR	**MI**	82
31 DNF	GT1	27	(United Kingdom) Parabolica Motorsport	(United Kingdom) Gary Ayles (United Kingdom) Chris Goodwin	BMW S70 6.0L V12	**MI**	82
32 DNF	GT2	61	(Switzerland) Stadler Motorsport	(Switzerland) Enzo Calderari (Switzerland) Lilian Bryner (Germany) Ulli Richter	Porsche 911 GT2	**P**	51
32 DNF	GT2	61	(Switzerland) Stadler Motorsport	(Switzerland) Enzo Calderari (Switzerland) Lilian Bryner (Germany) Ulli Richter	Porsche 3.6L Turbo Flat-6	**P**	51
33 DNF	GT2	66	(Germany) Konrad Motorsport	(Austria) Franz Konrad (Switzerland) Toni Seiler (United States) Nick Ham	Porsche 911 GT2	**P**	37
33 DNF	GT2	66	(Germany) Konrad Motorsport	(Austria) Franz Konrad (Switzerland) Toni Seiler (United States) Nick Ham	Porsche 3.6L Turbo Flat-6	**P**	37
34 DNF	GT2	95	(United States) Saleen-Allen Speedlab (United Kingdom) Cirtek Motorsport	(United States) Steve Saleen (Spain) Carlos Palau	Saleen Mustang RRR	**D**	22
34 DNF	GT2	95	(United States) Saleen-Allen Speedlab (United Kingdom) Cirtek Motorsport	(United States) Steve Saleen (Spain) Carlos Palau	Ford 5.9L V8	**D**	22
35 DNF	GT2	59	(Netherlands) Marcos Racing International	(Netherlands) Cor Euser (Germany) Harald Becker	Marcos LM600	**D**	65
35 DNF	GT2	59	(Netherlands) Marcos Racing International	(Netherlands) Cor Euser (Germany) Harald Becker	Chevrolet 5.9L V8	**D**	65
36 DNF	GT1	9	(Germany) BMW Motorsport (Germany) Schnitzer Motorsport	(Netherlands) Peter Kox (Finland) JJ Lehto	McLaren F1 GTR	**MI**	12
36 DNF	GT1	9	(Germany) BMW Motorsport (Germany) Schnitzer Motorsport	(Netherlands) Peter Kox (Finland) JJ Lehto	BMW S70 6.0L V12	**MI**	12
37 DNF	GT2	55	(Austria) Augustin Motorsport	(Germany) Wido Rössler (Germany) Wolfgang Kaufmann	Porsche 911 GT2	**G**	11
37 DNF	GT2	55	(Austria) Augustin Motorsport	(Germany) Wido Rössler (Germany) Wolfgang Kaufmann	Porsche 3.6L Turbo Flat-6	**G**	11
38 DNF	GT1	20	(France) DAMS Panoz	(France) Éric Bernard (France) Franck Lagorce	Panoz Esperante GTR-1	**MI**	10
38 DNF	GT1	20	(France) DAMS Panoz	(France) Éric Bernard (France) Franck Lagorce	Ford (Roush) 6.0L V8	**MI**	10
39 DNF	GT1	13	(United Kingdom) GT1 Lotus Racing	(France) Fabien Giroix (Switzerland) Jean-Denis Délétraz	Lotus Elise GT1	**MI**	7
39 DNF	GT1	13	(United Kingdom) GT1 Lotus Racing	(France) Fabien Giroix (Switzerland) Jean-Denis Délétraz	Chevrolet LT5 6.0L V8	**MI**	7
40 DNF	GT2	80	(United Kingdom) Morgan Motor Company	(United Kingdom) Mark Hales (United Kingdom) William Wykeham (United Kingdom) David Vegher	Morgan Plus 8 GTR	**D**	2
40 DNF	GT2	80	(United Kingdom) Morgan Motor Company	(United Kingdom) Mark Hales (United Kingdom) William Wykeham (United Kingdom) David Vegher	Rover 5.0L V8	**D**	2
DSQ^{†}	GT1	5	(United Kingdom) David Price Racing	(Australia) David Brabham (United Kingdom) Andy Wallace	Panoz Esperante GTR-1	**G**	128
DSQ^{†}	GT1	5	(United Kingdom) David Price Racing	(Australia) David Brabham (United Kingdom) Andy Wallace	Ford (Roush) 6.0L V8	**G**	128
DSQ^{†}	GT1	4	(United Kingdom) David Price Racing	(United Kingdom) Perry McCarthy (France) Olivier Grouillard	Panoz Esperante GTR-1	**G**	124
DSQ^{†}	GT1	4	(United Kingdom) David Price Racing	(United Kingdom) Perry McCarthy (France) Olivier Grouillard	Ford (Roush) 6.0L V8	**G**	124

† – #4 and #5 David Price Racing entries were disqualified due to failing post-race technical inspection. Both cars have front brake ducts larger than those allowed by the rules.

== Statistics ==
- Pole Position – #12 AMG-Mercedes – 1:17.941
- Fastest Lap – #7 Porsche AG – 1:19.713
- Distance – 468.223 km
- Average Speed – 155.398 km/h

FIA GT Championship
Previous race: 1997 FIA GT Sebring 3 Hours	1997 season	Next race: None
