= 1997 FIA GT Spa 4 Hours =

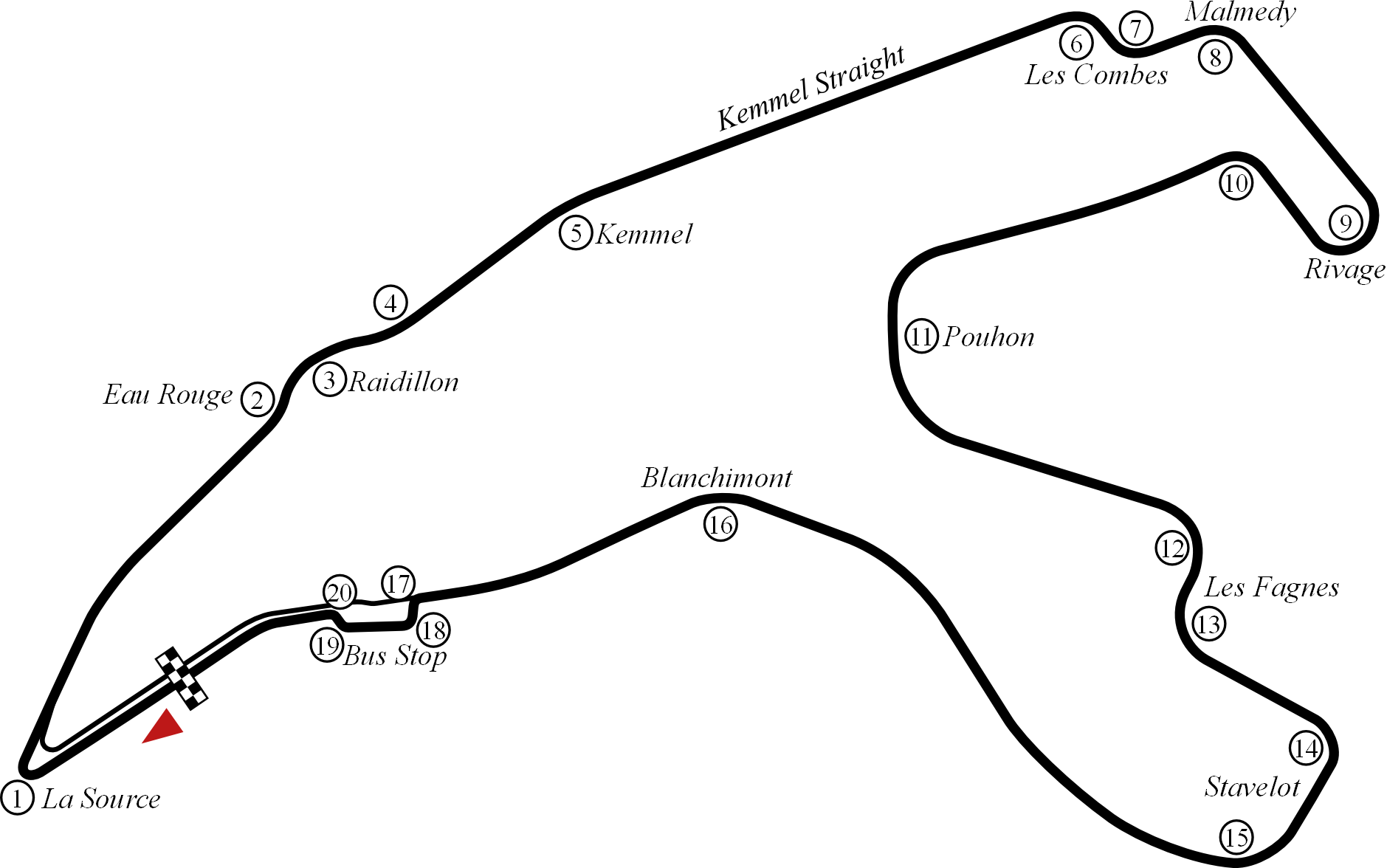
Layout of the Circuit de Spa-Francorchamps (1995-2003)

The 1997 FIA GT Spa 4 Hours was the fifth race of the 1997 FIA GT Championship season. It was run at Circuit de Spa-Francorchamps, Belgium on July 20, 1997.

== Official results ==
Class winners in bold. Cars failing to complete 75% of winner's distance marked as Not Classified (NC).

Pos	Class	No	Team	Drivers	Chassis	Tyre	Laps
Pos	Class	No	Team	Drivers	Engine	Tyre	Laps
1	**GT1**	**8**	**(Germany) BMW Motorsport (Germany) Schnitzer Motorsport**	**(Finland) JJ Lehto (United Kingdom) Steve Soper**	**McLaren F1 GTR**	**MI**	**101**
1	**GT1**	**8**	**(Germany) BMW Motorsport (Germany) Schnitzer Motorsport**	**(Finland) JJ Lehto (United Kingdom) Steve Soper**	**BMW S70 6.0L V12**	**MI**	**101**
2	GT1	11	(Germany) AMG-Mercedes	(Germany) Bernd Schneider (Austria) Alexander Wurz	Mercedes-Benz CLK GTR	**B**	101
2	GT1	11	(Germany) AMG-Mercedes	(Germany) Bernd Schneider (Austria) Alexander Wurz	Mercedes-Benz LS600 6.0L V12	**B**	101
3	GT1	7	(Germany) Porsche AG	(France) Bob Wollek (France) Yannick Dalmas	Porsche 911 GT1 Evo	**MI**	99
3	GT1	7	(Germany) Porsche AG	(France) Bob Wollek (France) Yannick Dalmas	Porsche 3.2L Turbo Flat-6	**MI**	99
4	GT1	9	(Germany) BMW Motorsport (Germany) Schnitzer Motorsport	(Netherlands) Peter Kox (Italy) Roberto Ravaglia	McLaren F1 GTR	**MI**	99
4	GT1	9	(Germany) BMW Motorsport (Germany) Schnitzer Motorsport	(Netherlands) Peter Kox (Italy) Roberto Ravaglia	BMW S70 6.0L V12	**MI**	99
5	GT1	12	(Germany) AMG-Mercedes	(Germany) Klaus Ludwig (Germany) Ralf Schumacher	Mercedes-Benz CLK GTR	**B**	99
5	GT1	12	(Germany) AMG-Mercedes	(Germany) Klaus Ludwig (Germany) Ralf Schumacher	Mercedes-Benz LS600 6.0L V12	**B**	99
6	GT1	27	(United Kingdom) Parabolica Motorsport	(United Kingdom) Gary Ayles (United Kingdom) Chris Goodwin	McLaren F1 GTR	**MI**	98
6	GT1	27	(United Kingdom) Parabolica Motorsport	(United Kingdom) Gary Ayles (United Kingdom) Chris Goodwin	BMW S70 6.0L V12	**MI**	98
7	GT1	16	(Germany) Roock Racing	(Germany) Ralf Kelleners (France) Stéphane Ortelli (Portugal) Pedro Chaves	Porsche 911 GT1	**MI**	98
7	GT1	16	(Germany) Roock Racing	(Germany) Ralf Kelleners (France) Stéphane Ortelli (Portugal) Pedro Chaves	Porsche 3.2L Turbo Flat-6	**MI**	98
8	GT1	13	(United Kingdom) GT1 Racing Franck Muller	(France) Fabien Giroix (Switzerland) Jean-Denis Délétraz	Lotus Elise GT1	**P**	96
8	GT1	13	(United Kingdom) GT1 Racing Franck Muller	(France) Fabien Giroix (Switzerland) Jean-Denis Délétraz	Chevrolet LT5 6.0L V8	**P**	96
9	GT1	4	(United Kingdom) David Price Racing	(United Kingdom) Andy Wallace (United Kingdom) James Weaver	Panoz Esperante GTR-1	**G**	96
9	GT1	4	(United Kingdom) David Price Racing	(United Kingdom) Andy Wallace (United Kingdom) James Weaver	Ford (Roush) 6.0L V8	**G**	96
10	GT1	22	(Italy) BMS Scuderia Italia	(Italy) Christian Pescatori (Italy) Pierluigi Martini	Porsche 911 GT1	**P**	94
10	GT1	22	(Italy) BMS Scuderia Italia	(Italy) Christian Pescatori (Italy) Pierluigi Martini	Porsche 3.2L Turbo Flat-6	**P**	94
11	**GT2**	**52**	**(France) Viper Team Oreca**	**(United Kingdom) Justin Bell (Belgium) Marc Duez**	**Chrysler Viper GTS-R**	**MI**	**93**
11	**GT2**	**52**	**(France) Viper Team Oreca**	**(United Kingdom) Justin Bell (Belgium) Marc Duez**	**Chrysler 8.0L V10**	**MI**	**93**
12	GT2	51	(France) Viper Team Oreca	(Monaco) Olivier Beretta (France) Philippe Gache	Chrysler Viper GTS-R	**MI**	92
12	GT2	51	(France) Viper Team Oreca	(Monaco) Olivier Beretta (France) Philippe Gache	Chrysler 8.0L V10	**MI**	92
13	GT2	59	(Netherlands) Marcos Racing International	(Netherlands) Cor Euser (Germany) Harald Becker	Marcos LM600	**D**	92
13	GT2	59	(Netherlands) Marcos Racing International	(Netherlands) Cor Euser (Germany) Harald Becker	Chevrolet 5.9L V8	**D**	92
14	GT2	75	(United Kingdom) G-Force Strandell	(United Kingdom) Geoff Lister (United Kingdom) John Greasley (Sweden) Magnus Wallinder	Porsche 911 GT2	**D**	90
14	GT2	75	(United Kingdom) G-Force Strandell	(United Kingdom) Geoff Lister (United Kingdom) John Greasley (Sweden) Magnus Wallinder	Porsche 3.6L Turbo Flat-6	**D**	90
15	GT2	50	(United Kingdom) Agusta Racing Team	(Italy) Rocky Agusta (Belgium) Michel Neugarten (Belgium) Bernard de Dryver	Porsche 911 GT2	**D**	89
15	GT2	50	(United Kingdom) Agusta Racing Team	(Italy) Rocky Agusta (Belgium) Michel Neugarten (Belgium) Bernard de Dryver	Porsche 3.6L Turbo Flat-6	**D**	89
16	GT2	56	(Germany) Roock Racing	(Germany) Claudia Hürtgen (Switzerland) Bruno Eichmann (Portugal) Ni Amorim	Porsche 911 GT2	**MI**	89
16	GT2	56	(Germany) Roock Racing	(Germany) Claudia Hürtgen (Switzerland) Bruno Eichmann (Portugal) Ni Amorim	Porsche 3.6L Turbo Flat-6	**MI**	89
17	GT1	10	(Germany) AMG-Mercedes	(Germany) Marcel Tiemann (Italy) Alessandro Nannini	Mercedes-Benz CLK GTR	**B**	89
17	GT1	10	(Germany) AMG-Mercedes	(Germany) Marcel Tiemann (Italy) Alessandro Nannini	Mercedes-Benz LS600 6.0L V12	**B**	89
18	GT2	66	(Germany) Konrad Motorsport	(Austria) Franz Konrad (Switzerland) Toni Seiler (Germany) Gerd Ruch	Porsche 911 GT2	**P**	89
18	GT2	66	(Germany) Konrad Motorsport	(Austria) Franz Konrad (Switzerland) Toni Seiler (Germany) Gerd Ruch	Porsche 3.6L Turbo Flat-6	**P**	89
19	GT2	57	(Germany) Roock Racing	(France) Stéphane Ortelli (France) François Lafon (France) Jean-Marc Smadja	Porsche 911 GT2	**MI**	89
19	GT2	57	(Germany) Roock Racing	(France) Stéphane Ortelli (France) François Lafon (France) Jean-Marc Smadja	Porsche 3.6L Turbo Flat-6	**MI**	89
20	GT2	65	(Germany) RWS	(Italy) Luca Riccitelli (Italy) Raffaele Sangiuolo (Germany) Benno Rottenfusser	Porsche 911 GT2	?	88
20	GT2	65	(Germany) RWS	(Italy) Luca Riccitelli (Italy) Raffaele Sangiuolo (Germany) Benno Rottenfusser	Porsche 3.6L Turbo Flat-6	?	88
21	GT2	71	(Italy) GT Racing Team	(Italy) Luca Drudi (Italy) Luigino Pagotto	Porsche 911 GT2	?	88
21	GT2	71	(Italy) GT Racing Team	(Italy) Luca Drudi (Italy) Luigino Pagotto	Porsche 3.6L Turbo Flat-6	?	88
22	GT1	25	(France) BBA Compétition	(France) David Velay (France) Jean-Luc Maury-Laribière (France) Bernard Chauvin	McLaren F1 GTR	**D**	87
22	GT1	25	(France) BBA Compétition	(France) David Velay (France) Jean-Luc Maury-Laribière (France) Bernard Chauvin	BMW S70 6.1L V12	**D**	87
23	GT2	70	(Germany) Dellenbach Motorsport	(Germany) Güther Blieninger (Austria) Wolfgang Treml (Germany) Klaus Horn	Porsche 911 GT2	**D**	87
23	GT2	70	(Germany) Dellenbach Motorsport	(Germany) Güther Blieninger (Austria) Wolfgang Treml (Germany) Klaus Horn	Porsche 3.6L Turbo Flat-6	**D**	87
24	GT2	53	(United Kingdom) Chamberlain Engineering	(Republic of Ireland) Tim O'Kennedy (Netherlands) Hans Hugenholtz	Chrysler Viper GTS-R	**G**	87
24	GT2	53	(United Kingdom) Chamberlain Engineering	(Republic of Ireland) Tim O'Kennedy (Netherlands) Hans Hugenholtz	Chrysler 8.0L V10	**G**	87
25	GT2	77	(United States) Saleen-Allen Speedlab (United Kingdom) Cirtek Motorsport	(United Kingdom) James Kaye (United Kingdom) Peter Owen (United Kingdom) Guy Smith	Saleen Mustang RRR	**D**	86
25	GT2	77	(United States) Saleen-Allen Speedlab (United Kingdom) Cirtek Motorsport	(United Kingdom) James Kaye (United Kingdom) Peter Owen (United Kingdom) Guy Smith	Ford 5.9L V8	**D**	86
26	GT2	58	(France) Estoril Racing	(France) Michel Monteiro (Portugal) Manuel Monteiro	Porsche 911 GT2	?	86
26	GT2	58	(France) Estoril Racing	(France) Michel Monteiro (Portugal) Manuel Monteiro	Porsche 3.6L Turbo Flat-6	?	86
27	GT2	63	(Germany) Krauss Motorsport	(Germany) Michael Trunk (Germany) Bernhard Müller	Porsche 911 GT2	**P**	86
27	GT2	63	(Germany) Krauss Motorsport	(Germany) Michael Trunk (Germany) Bernhard Müller	Porsche 3.6L Turbo Flat-6	**P**	86
28	GT2	62	(Switzerland) Stadler Motorsport	(Switzerland) Denis Lay (Switzerland) Uwe Sick (Germany) Axel Röhr	Porsche 911 GT2	**P**	86
28	GT2	62	(Switzerland) Stadler Motorsport	(Switzerland) Denis Lay (Switzerland) Uwe Sick (Germany) Axel Röhr	Porsche 3.6L Turbo Flat-6	**P**	86
29	GT1	31	(Austria) Augustin Motorsport	(Austria) Hans-Jörg Hofer (Italy) Stefano Buttiero (Austria) Horst Felbermayr	Porsche 911 GT2 Evo	**G**	86
29	GT1	31	(Austria) Augustin Motorsport	(Austria) Hans-Jörg Hofer (Italy) Stefano Buttiero (Austria) Horst Felbermayr	Porsche 3.6L Turbo Flat-6	**G**	86
30	GT2	69	(Germany) Proton Motorsport	(Germany) Gerold Ried (France) Patrick Vuillaume	Porsche 911 GT2	**P**	85
30	GT2	69	(Germany) Proton Motorsport	(Germany) Gerold Ried (France) Patrick Vuillaume	Porsche 3.6L Turbo Flat-6	**P**	85
31 DNF	GT1	15	(France) First Racing Project (United Kingdom) Lotus Racing	(Thailand) Ratanakul Prutirat (France) Jérôme Policand	Lotus Elise GT1	**P**	63
31 DNF	GT1	15	(France) First Racing Project (United Kingdom) Lotus Racing	(Thailand) Ratanakul Prutirat (France) Jérôme Policand	Chevrolet LT5 6.0L V8	**P**	63
32 DNF	GT2	68	(Italy) Rennsport Italia	(Italy) Angelo Zadra (Italy) Leonardo Maddalena (Italy) Renato Mastropietro	Porsche 911 GT2	?	46
32 DNF	GT2	68	(Italy) Rennsport Italia	(Italy) Angelo Zadra (Italy) Leonardo Maddalena (Italy) Renato Mastropietro	Porsche 3.6L Turbo Flat-6	?	46
33 DNF	GT1	17	(France) JB Racing	(Germany) Jürgen von Gartzen (France) Emmanuel Collard	Porsche 911 GT1	**MI**	45
33 DNF	GT1	17	(France) JB Racing	(Germany) Jürgen von Gartzen (France) Emmanuel Collard	Porsche 3.2L Turbo Flat-6	**MI**	45
34 DNF	GT2	80	(United Kingdom) Morgan Motor Company	(United Kingdom) Charles Morgan (United Kingdom) William Wykeham	Morgan Plus 8 GTR	**D**	42
34 DNF	GT2	80	(United Kingdom) Morgan Motor Company	(United Kingdom) Charles Morgan (United Kingdom) William Wykeham	Rover 3.9L V8	**D**	42
35 DNF	GT2	78	(United States) Saleen-Allen Speedlab (United Kingdom) Cirtek Motorsport	(United Kingdom) Allen Lloyd (Brazil) Thomas Erdos	Saleen Mustang RRR	**D**	37
35 DNF	GT2	78	(United States) Saleen-Allen Speedlab (United Kingdom) Cirtek Motorsport	(United Kingdom) Allen Lloyd (Brazil) Thomas Erdos	Ford 5.9L V8	**D**	37
36 DNF	GT2	67	(Germany) Konrad Motorsport	(Italy) Marco Spinelli (United States) Kelly Collins (United States) Barry Waddell	Porsche 911 GT2	**P**	36
36 DNF	GT2	67	(Germany) Konrad Motorsport	(Italy) Marco Spinelli (United States) Kelly Collins (United States) Barry Waddell	Porsche 3.6L Turbo Flat-6	**P**	36
37 DNF	GT1	21	(Germany) Kremer Racing	(France) Christophe Bouchut (Sweden) Carl Rosenblad	Porsche 911 GT1	**G**	27
37 DNF	GT1	21	(Germany) Kremer Racing	(France) Christophe Bouchut (Sweden) Carl Rosenblad	Porsche 3.2L Turbo Flat-6	**G**	27
38 DNF	GT2	55	(Austria) Augustin Motorsport	(Austria) Manfred Jurasz (Germany) Helmut Reis (Germany) Wido Rössler	Porsche 911 GT2	**G**	23
38 DNF	GT2	55	(Austria) Augustin Motorsport	(Austria) Manfred Jurasz (Germany) Helmut Reis (Germany) Wido Rössler	Porsche 3.6L Turbo Flat-6	**G**	23
39 DNF	GT1	19	(Germany) Martin Veyhle Racing (MVR)	(Germany) Alexander Grau (Denmark) Kurt Thiim	Lotus Elise GT1	?	22
39 DNF	GT1	19	(Germany) Martin Veyhle Racing (MVR)	(Germany) Alexander Grau (Denmark) Kurt Thiim	Lotus 3.5L Turbo V8	?	22
40 DNF	GT1	14	(United Kingdom) GT1 Racing Franck Muller	(Netherlands) Jan Lammers (Netherlands) Mike Hezemans	Lotus Elise GT1	**P**	20
40 DNF	GT1	14	(United Kingdom) GT1 Racing Franck Muller	(Netherlands) Jan Lammers (Netherlands) Mike Hezemans	Chevrolet LT5 6.0L V8	**P**	20
41 DNF	GT1	20	(France) DAMS Panoz	(France) Éric Bernard (France) Franck Lagorce	Panoz Esperante GTR-1	**MI**	11
41 DNF	GT1	20	(France) DAMS Panoz	(France) Éric Bernard (France) Franck Lagorce	Ford (Roush) 6.0L V8	**MI**	11
42 DNF	GT1	6	(Germany) Porsche AG	(Germany) Hans-Joachim Stuck (Belgium) Thierry Boutsen	Porsche 911 GT1 Evo	**MI**	10
42 DNF	GT1	6	(Germany) Porsche AG	(Germany) Hans-Joachim Stuck (Belgium) Thierry Boutsen	Porsche 3.2L Turbo Flat-6	**MI**	10
43 DNF	GT1	26	(Germany) Konrad Motorsport	(Italy) Mauro Baldi (Italy) Max Angelelli	Porsche 911 GT1	**P**	3
43 DNF	GT1	26	(Germany) Konrad Motorsport	(Italy) Mauro Baldi (Italy) Max Angelelli	Porsche 3.2L Turbo Flat-6	**P**	3
44 DNF	GT1	1	(United Kingdom) Gulf Team Davidoff (United Kingdom) GTC Racing	(United Kingdom) Andrew Gilbert-Scott (Sweden) Anders Olofsson	McLaren F1 GTR	**MI**	0
44 DNF	GT1	1	(United Kingdom) Gulf Team Davidoff (United Kingdom) GTC Racing	(United Kingdom) Andrew Gilbert-Scott (Sweden) Anders Olofsson	BMW S70 6.0L V12	**MI**	0
45 DNF	GT1	2	(United Kingdom) Gulf Team Davidoff (United Kingdom) GTC Racing	(Denmark) John Nielsen (Germany) Thomas Bscher	McLaren F1 GTR	**MI**	0
45 DNF	GT1	2	(United Kingdom) Gulf Team Davidoff (United Kingdom) GTC Racing	(Denmark) John Nielsen (Germany) Thomas Bscher	BMW S70 6.0L V12	**MI**	0
46 DNF	GT1	3	(United Kingdom) Gulf Team Davidoff (United Kingdom) GTC Racing	(France) Jean-Marc Gounon (France) Pierre-Henri Raphanel	McLaren F1 GTR	**MI**	0
46 DNF	GT1	3	(United Kingdom) Gulf Team Davidoff (United Kingdom) GTC Racing	(France) Jean-Marc Gounon (France) Pierre-Henri Raphanel	BMW S70 6.0L V12	**MI**	0
DNS	GT1	5	(United Kingdom) David Price Racing	(Australia) David Brabham (United Kingdom) Perry McCarthy	Panoz Esperante GTR-1	**G**	–
DNS	GT1	5	(United Kingdom) David Price Racing	(Australia) David Brabham (United Kingdom) Perry McCarthy	Ford (Roush) 6.0L V8	**G**	–

== Statistics ==
- Pole Position – #8 BMW Motorsport – 2:08.984
- Fastest Lap – #11 AMG-Mercedes – 2:12.058
- Distance – 704.374 km
- Average Speed – 174.701 km/h

FIA GT Championship
Previous race: 1997 FIA GT Nürburgring 4 Hours	1997 season	Next race: 1997 FIA GT Zeltweg 4 Hours
