= BMW M70 =

BMW M70 engine
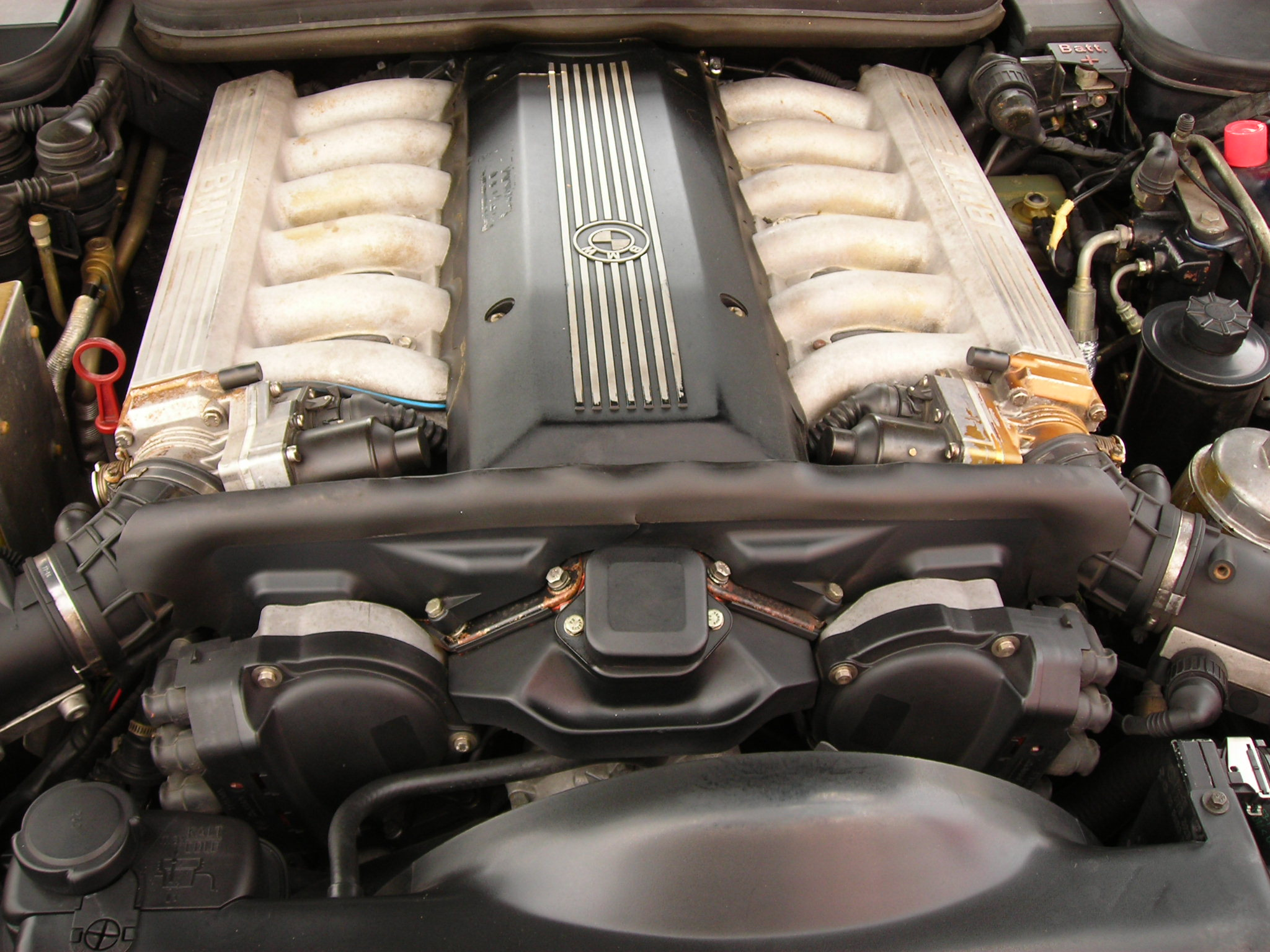

Overview
- Production: 1987–1994

Layout
- Configuration: 60° V12
- Displacement: 5.0 L (4,988 cc)
- Cylinder bore: 84 mm (3.31 in)
- Piston stroke: 75 mm (2.95 in)
- Cylinder block material: Aluminium
- Cylinder head material: Aluminium
- Valvetrain: SOHC

Combustion
- Fuel type: Petrol

Output
- Power output: 220 kW (295 hp)
- Torque output: 450 N⋅m (332 lb⋅ft)

Chronology
- Predecessor: None
- Successor: BMW M73

The BMW M70 is a naturally-aspirated, SOHC, V12 petrol engine, which was BMW's first production V12 and was produced from 1987 to 1996. It was also the first German 12-cylinder post-war automobile engine, predating Mercedes-Benz's M120 by four years and VW's W12 by fourteen.

The BMW S70/2 engine, largely unrelated to the M70 and S70B56 engines, is a naturally-aspirated, DOHC, V12 petrol engine, which powered the 1993 to 1998 McLaren F1.

== Design ==
The M70's design is similar to that of two 2.5 L M20 straight-six engines joined at a 60-degree angle, due to the following features: single overhead camshaft valvetrain, bore spacing of 91 mm (3.6 in), bore of 84 mm (3.31 in), stroke of 75 mm (2.95 in), and a compression ratio of 8.8:1.

The M70 has the following differences with the M20 engine:

- Aluminium alloy engine block (AluSil) instead of cast-iron (both engines have an aluminium cylinder head), to reduce weight.
- Airflow measurement using Mass air flow sensors (MAFs) instead of Air flow meters (AFMs) to improve fuel economy.
- Electronic Throttle Control instead of a mechanical throttle cable.
- A timing chain was used instead of a timing belt, to reduce servicing requirements.
- Hydraulic valve lifters instead of mechanically adjusted tappets, to reduce servicing requirements.

The M70 has two Motronic 1.3 ECUs (one for each cylinder bank). To provide redundancy, the M70 also has two fuel pumps, fuel rails, distributors, mass air flow sensors, crankshaft position sensors, coolant temperature sensors and throttle bodies.

Some M70 engines (such as fitted to the E32 750iL Highline) are fitted with two alternators. The second alternator is smaller and is used to charge an auxiliary battery and power equipment in the rear passenger compartment, such as a telephone, fax machine, wine cooler, independent climate control and power sun shields.

== Versions ==
Version	Displacement	Power	Torque	Redline	Years
M70B50	4,988 cc (304.4 cu in)	220 kW (295 hp) at 5,200 rpm	450 N⋅m (332 lb⋅ft) at 4,100 rpm	6,000	1987–1994
S70B56	5,576 cc (340.3 cu in)	280 kW (375 hp) at 5,300 rpm	550 N⋅m (406 lb⋅ft) at 4,000 rpm	6,400	1992–1996
S70/2	6,064 cc (370.0 cu in)	461 kW (618 hp) at 7,400 rpm	617 or 651 N⋅m (455 or 480 lb⋅ft) at 6,700 rpm	7,500	1993–1998
S70/3	5,990 cc (365.5 cu in)	467 kW (626 hp) at 6,500 rpm (Note: S70/3 specifications are for the race car with twin 32.9 mm (1.30 in) air restrictors, as required by 24 Hours of Le Mans rules at the time.)	670 N⋅m (494 lb⋅ft) at 4,500 rpm	8,000	1998–2000

=== M70B50 ===
Applications:

- 1987–1994 E32 750i/750iL – this was mated primarily to an automatic ZF 4HP24 transmission
- 1989–1994 E31 850i/850Ci – this was mated to either the automatic ZF 4HP24 transmission or the optional Getrag 560G
- 1988 Alpina B12
- 1991 BMW Nazca M12
- 1992 BMW Nazca C2

== S70 engine ==
BMW S70 engine
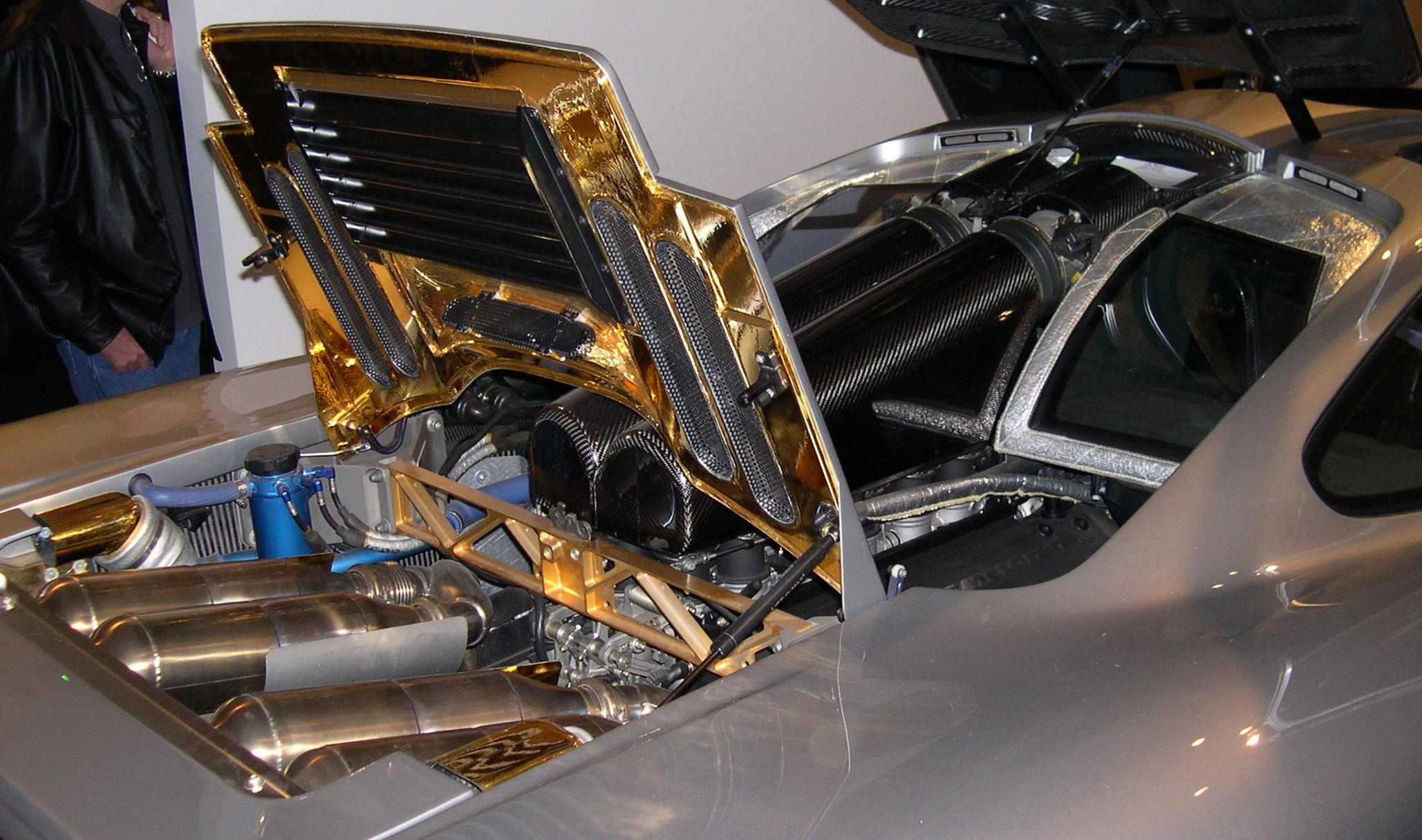
- Engine bay of a McLaren F1

Overview
- Production: 1992–2000

Layout
- Configuration: 60° V12
- Displacement: 5.6 L (5,576 cc); 6.1 L (6,064 cc); 6.0 L (5,990 cc)
- Cylinder bore: 86 mm (3.39 in)
- Piston stroke: 80 mm (3.15 in); 87 mm (3.43 in); 85.9 mm (3.38 in)
- Cylinder block material: Aluminium
- Cylinder head material: Aluminium
- Valvetrain: DOHC, with VVT
- Compression ratio: 11:1

Combustion
- Fuel type: Petrol
- Cooling system: Water-cooled

Output
- Power output: 280–500 kW (375–671 hp)
- Torque output: 550–705 N⋅m (406–520 lb⋅ft)

Dimensions
- Dry weight: 265 kg (584 lb)

Chronology
- Predecessor: None
- Successor: None

=== S70B56 ===
The first engine to use the S70 name is a 5,576 cc (340.3 cu in) variant of the M70 engine fitted only to the E31 850CSi. With 1,510 units produced, this is the lowest production number BMW-engine, for a BMW-car to date.

Three prototype dual overhead camshaft S70 engines were constructed, prior to the decision to not produce an E31 M8 model.

Applications:

- 1992–1996 E31 850CSi
- 1993 BMW Nazca C2 Spider
- 2011 Simbol Design Lavazza GTX-R (twin-turbo version)

=== S70/2 ===
The S70/2, while sharing the same 12 cylinder layout, bore spacing and design principle as the S70B56, is essentially a new design with the heads based on the European market S50B30, and thus featuring 4 valves per cylinder and variable valve timing (called VANOS by BMW) and individual throttle bodies. A dry sump oiling system is used. The weight of the S70/2, plus ancillaries and full exhaust, is 265 kg (584 lb).

Applications:

- 1993–1998 McLaren F1

=== S70/3 ===
The S70/3 is a racing engine based on the S70/2.

Applications

- 1998–1999 BMW V12 LM racing car
- 1999–2000 BMW V12 LMR racing car
- 2000 BMW X5 LM concept car

== See also ==
- BMW Goldfisch V16
