= 1997 FIA GT Helsinki 3 Hours =

Layout of the Helsinki Thunder street circuit for 1997

The 1997 FIA GT Helsinki 3 Hours was the third race of the 1997 FIA GT Championship season. It was run at a temporary street circuit in Helsinki, Finland on May 25, 1997, jointly with the Formula 3000.

Due to the upcoming of the Le Mans 24 hours race, many teams opted not to participate in this event. This included the factory Porsche, Lotus and Chrysler squads.

== Official results ==
Class winners in bold. Cars failing to complete 75% of winner's distance marked as Not Classified (NC).

Pos	Class	No	Team	Drivers	Chassis	Tyre	Laps
Pos	Class	No	Team	Drivers	Engine	Tyre	Laps
1	**GT1**	**8**	**(Germany) BMW Motorsport (Germany) Schnitzer Motorsport**	**(Finland) JJ Lehto (United Kingdom) Steve Soper**	**McLaren F1 GTR**	MI	**113**
1	**GT1**	**8**	**(Germany) BMW Motorsport (Germany) Schnitzer Motorsport**	**(Finland) JJ Lehto (United Kingdom) Steve Soper**	**BMW S70 6.0L V12**	MI	**113**
2	GT1	16	(Germany) Roock Racing	(Germany) Ralf Kelleners (France) Stéphane Ortelli	Porsche 911 GT1	MI	110
2	GT1	16	(Germany) Roock Racing	(Germany) Ralf Kelleners (France) Stéphane Ortelli	Porsche 3.2L Turbo Flat-6	MI	110
3	GT1	2	(United Kingdom) Gulf Team Davidoff (United Kingdom) GTC Racing	(Germany) Thomas Bscher (Denmark) John Nielsen	McLaren F1 GTR	MI	110
3	GT1	2	(United Kingdom) Gulf Team Davidoff (United Kingdom) GTC Racing	(Germany) Thomas Bscher (Denmark) John Nielsen	BMW S70 6.0L V12	MI	110
4	GT1	1	(United Kingdom) Gulf Team Davidoff (United Kingdom) GTC Racing	(United Kingdom) Andrew Gilbert-Scott (France) Jean-Marc Gounon (France) Pierre-Henri Raphanel	McLaren F1 GTR	MI	109
4	GT1	1	(United Kingdom) Gulf Team Davidoff (United Kingdom) GTC Racing	(United Kingdom) Andrew Gilbert-Scott (France) Jean-Marc Gounon (France) Pierre-Henri Raphanel	BMW S70 6.0L V12	MI	109
5	GT1	24	(United Kingdom) GBF UK Ltd.	(Italy) Mauro Martini (Italy) Andrea Boldrini	Lotus Elise GT1	MI	109
5	GT1	24	(United Kingdom) GBF UK Ltd.	(Italy) Mauro Martini (Italy) Andrea Boldrini	Lotus 3.5L Turbo V8	MI	109
6	GT1	22	(Italy) BMS Scuderia Italia	(Italy) Pierluigi Martini (Italy) Christian Pescatori	Porsche 911 GT1	P	108
6	GT1	22	(Italy) BMS Scuderia Italia	(Italy) Pierluigi Martini (Italy) Christian Pescatori	Porsche 3.2L Turbo Flat-6	P	108
7	GT1	26	(Germany) Konrad Motorsport	(Austria) Franz Konrad (Italy) Mauro Baldi (Italy) Max Angelelli	Porsche 911 GT1	P	108
7	GT1	26	(Germany) Konrad Motorsport	(Austria) Franz Konrad (Italy) Mauro Baldi (Italy) Max Angelelli	Porsche 3.2L Turbo Flat-6	P	108
8	GT1	11	(Germany) AMG-Mercedes	(Germany) Bernd Schneider (Austria) Alexander Wurz	Mercedes-Benz CLK GTR	B	107
8	GT1	11	(Germany) AMG-Mercedes	(Germany) Bernd Schneider (Austria) Alexander Wurz	Mercedes-Benz LS600 6.0L V12	B	107
9	**GT2**	**56**	**(Germany) Roock Racing**	**(Germany) Claudia Hürtgen (Switzerland) Bruno Eichmann (Portugal) Ni Amorim**	**Porsche 911 GT2**	MI	**106**
9	**GT2**	**56**	**(Germany) Roock Racing**	**(Germany) Claudia Hürtgen (Switzerland) Bruno Eichmann (Portugal) Ni Amorim**	**Porsche 3.6L Turbo Flat-6**	MI	**106**
10	GT2	59	(Netherlands) Marcos Racing International	(Netherlands) Cor Euser (Germany) Harald Becker	Marcos LM600	D	106
10	GT2	59	(Netherlands) Marcos Racing International	(Netherlands) Cor Euser (Germany) Harald Becker	Chevrolet 5.9L V8	D	106
11	GT1	31	(Austria) Augustin Motorsport	(Austria) Karl Augustin (Austria) Horst Felbermayr (Italy) Stefano Buttiero	Porsche 911 GT2 Evo	G	103
11	GT1	31	(Austria) Augustin Motorsport	(Austria) Karl Augustin (Austria) Horst Felbermayr (Italy) Stefano Buttiero	Porsche 3.6L Turbo Flat-6	G	103
12	GT2	63	(Germany) Krauss Motorsport	(Germany) Michael Trunk (Germany) Bernhard Müller	Porsche 911 GT2	P	103
12	GT2	63	(Germany) Krauss Motorsport	(Germany) Michael Trunk (Germany) Bernhard Müller	Porsche 3.6L Turbo Flat-6	P	103
13	GT1	9	(Germany) BMW Motorsport (Germany) Schnitzer Motorsport	(Netherlands) Peter Kox (Italy) Roberto Ravaglia	McLaren F1 GTR	MI	101
13	GT1	9	(Germany) BMW Motorsport (Germany) Schnitzer Motorsport	(Netherlands) Peter Kox (Italy) Roberto Ravaglia	BMW S70 6.0L V12	MI	101
14	GT2	53	(United Kingdom) Chamberlain Engineering	(Finland) Pertti Lievonen (Finland) Jari Nurminen	Chrysler Viper GTS-R	G	100
14	GT2	53	(United Kingdom) Chamberlain Engineering	(Finland) Pertti Lievonen (Finland) Jari Nurminen	Chrysler 8.0L V10	G	100
15	GT2	55	(Austria) Augustin Motorsport	(Austria) Manfred Jurasz (Germany) Helmut Reis (Germany) Wido Rössler	Porsche 911 GT2	G	100
15	GT2	55	(Austria) Augustin Motorsport	(Austria) Manfred Jurasz (Germany) Helmut Reis (Germany) Wido Rössler	Porsche 3.6L Turbo Flat-6	G	100
16	GT1	10	(Germany) AMG-Mercedes	(Germany) Klaus Ludwig (Italy) Alessandro Nannini	Mercedes-Benz CLK GTR	B	98
16	GT1	10	(Germany) AMG-Mercedes	(Germany) Klaus Ludwig (Italy) Alessandro Nannini	Mercedes-Benz LS600 6.0L V12	B	98
17	GT1	15	(United Kingdom) Lotus Racing Franck Muller (France) Giroix Racing	(France) Fabien Giroix (Thailand) Ratanakul Prutirat (Switzerland) Jean-Denis Délétraz	Lotus Elise GT1	P	97
17	GT1	15	(United Kingdom) Lotus Racing Franck Muller (France) Giroix Racing	(France) Fabien Giroix (Thailand) Ratanakul Prutirat (Switzerland) Jean-Denis Délétraz	Chevrolet LT5 6.0L V8	P	97
18	GT2	69	(Germany) Proton Competition	(Germany) Gerold Ried (France) Patrick Vuillaume	Porsche 911 GT2	P	94
18	GT2	69	(Germany) Proton Competition	(Germany) Gerold Ried (France) Patrick Vuillaume	Porsche 3.6L Turbo Flat-6	P	94
19	GT2	60	(Netherlands) Marcos Racing International	(Finland) Ville-Pertti Teuronen (Finland) Teijo Lahti	Marcos LM600	D	93
19	GT2	60	(Netherlands) Marcos Racing International	(Finland) Ville-Pertti Teuronen (Finland) Teijo Lahti	Chevrolet 5.9L V8	D	93
20	GT1	23	(United Kingdom) GBF UK Ltd.	(Italy) Luca Badoer (Italy) Mimmo Schiattarella	Lotus Elise GT1	MI	83
20	GT1	23	(United Kingdom) GBF UK Ltd.	(Italy) Luca Badoer (Italy) Mimmo Schiattarella	Lotus 3.5L Turbo V8	MI	83
21 DNF	GT2	57	(Germany) Roock Racing	(France) François Lafon (France) Jean-Pierre Jarier	Porsche 911 GT2	MI	65
21 DNF	GT2	57	(Germany) Roock Racing	(France) François Lafon (France) Jean-Pierre Jarier	Porsche 3.6L Turbo Flat-6	MI	65
22 DNF	GT2	80	(United Kingdom) Morgan Motor Company	(United Kingdom) Charles Morgan (United Kingdom) William Wykeham	Morgan Plus 8 GTR	D	31
22 DNF	GT2	80	(United Kingdom) Morgan Motor Company	(United Kingdom) Charles Morgan (United Kingdom) William Wykeham	Rover V8 3.9L V8	D	31
23 DNF	GT2	66	(Germany) Konrad Motorsport	(France) Michel Ligonnet (Italy) Marco Spinelli (Switzerland) Toni Seiler	Porsche 911 GT2	P	30
23 DNF	GT2	66	(Germany) Konrad Motorsport	(France) Michel Ligonnet (Italy) Marco Spinelli (Switzerland) Toni Seiler	Porsche 3.6L Turbo Flat-6	P	30

== Statistics ==
- Pole Position – #8 BMW Motorsport – 1:26.097
- Fastest Lap – #11 AMG-Mercedes – 1:27.901
- Distance – 359.341 km
- Average Speed – 119.420 km/h

FIA GT Championship
Previous race: 1997 FIA GT Silverstone 4 Hours	1997 season	Next race: 1997 FIA GT Nürburgring 4 Hours
