= 1997 FIA GT Championship =

Inaugural auto racing series

Seasons
- ← 1996 (BPR) 1998 →

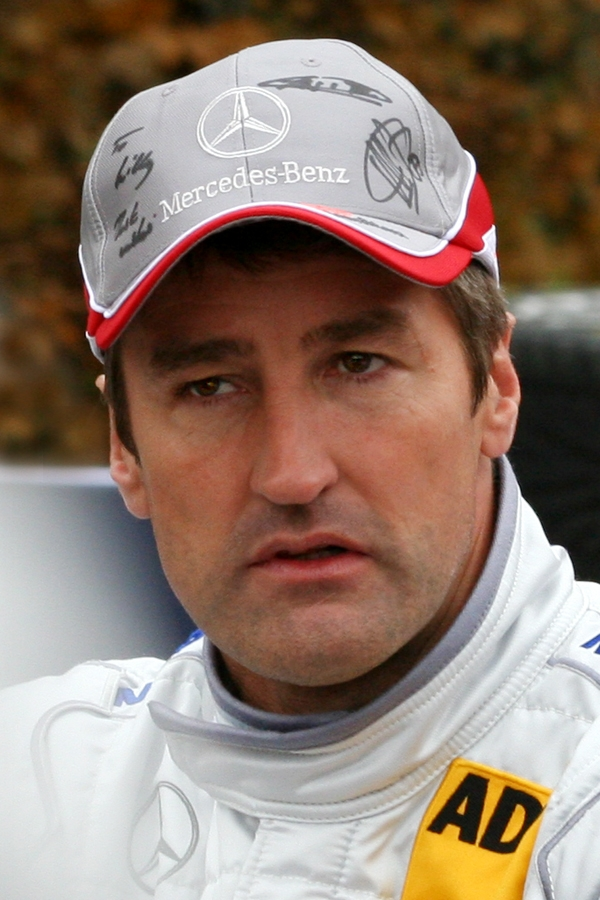
Bernd Schneider won the inaugural FIA GT Championship for the GT1 category

The 1997 FIA GT Championship was the inaugural season of FIA GT Championship, an auto racing series endorsed by the Fédération Internationale de l'Automobile (FIA) and organized by the Stéphane Ratel Organisation (SRO). The FIA GT Championship replaced the BPR Global GT Series which had been held races and championships from 1994 to 1996 after the series was promoted by the FIA, while Stéphane Ratel took over as promoter and organizer of the new championship, replaced the former BPR Organisation after the departure of partners Jürgen Barth and Patrick Peter. The races featured grand touring cars conforming to two categories of regulations, GT1 and GT2, and awarded driver and team championships in each category. The season began on 13 April 1997 and ended on 26 October 1997 after 11 rounds, visiting Europe, Japan, and the United States.

Bernd Schneider and his AMG Mercedes team won the GT1 Drivers' and Teams' Championships, while Justin Bell and Viper Team Oreca secured the GT2 titles.

== Schedule ==
For the new international championship, much of the calendar was new. The Nürburgring, Spa, Silverstone, and Suzuka's endurance event were all retained, but much of the European calendar was new to the series. Donington Park replaced Brands Hatch as the second British round, while Hockenheimring was added as a second German event. Mugello took over from Monza in Italy, and A1-Ring also brought the series to Austria for the first time. A street circuit in Helsinki was unique to the calendar, and served as the first race of a shorter three-hour duration. Two American events of a three-hour duration replaced the former season-ending fly-away race in China, visiting Sebring and Laguna Seca.

Rnd	Race	Circuit	Date
1	Hockenheim 4 Hours	Hockenheimring, Hockenheim, Germany	13 April
2	British Empire Trophy	Silverstone Circuit, Silverstone, United Kingdom	11 May
3	Helsinki 3 Hours	Helsinki Thunder, Helsinki, Finland	25 May
4	Nürburgring 4 Hours	Nürburgring, Nürburg, Germany	29 June
5	Spa 4 Hours	Circuit de Spa-Francorchamps, Spa, Belgium	20 July
6	Zeltweg 4 Hours	A1-Ring, Spielberg, Austria	3 August
7	POKKA Suzuka 1000 km	Suzuka Circuit, Suzuka, Japan	24 August
8	Donington 4 Hours	Donington Park, Leicestershire, United Kingdom	14 September
9	Mugello 4 Hours	Mugello Circuit, Scarperia e San Piero, Italy	28 September
10	Sebring 3 Hours	Sebring International Raceway, Florida, United States	18 October
11	Laguna Seca 3 Hours	Laguna Seca Raceway, California, United States	26 October

== Entries ==
=== GT1 ===
Entrant	Car	Engine	Tyre	No.	Drivers	Rounds
(United Kingdom) Gulf Team Davidoff	McLaren F1 GTR	BMW S70/2 6.0 L V12	M	1	(United Kingdom) Andrew Gilbert-Scott	1–7
(United Kingdom) Gulf Team Davidoff	McLaren F1 GTR	BMW S70/2 6.0 L V12	M	1	(United Kingdom) Ray Bellm	1–2
(United Kingdom) Gulf Team Davidoff	McLaren F1 GTR	BMW S70/2 6.0 L V12	M	1	(France) Pierre-Henri Raphanel	2–3
(United Kingdom) Gulf Team Davidoff	McLaren F1 GTR	BMW S70/2 6.0 L V12	M	1	(France) Jean-Marc Gounon	3
(United Kingdom) Gulf Team Davidoff	McLaren F1 GTR	BMW S70/2 6.0 L V12	M	1	(Sweden) Anders Olofsson	4–5, 8–11
(United Kingdom) Gulf Team Davidoff	McLaren F1 GTR	BMW S70/2 6.0 L V12	M	1	(United Kingdom) Geoff Lees	6–11
(United Kingdom) Gulf Team Davidoff	McLaren F1 GTR	BMW S70/2 6.0 L V12	M	1	(Denmark) John Nielsen	7
(United Kingdom) Gulf Team Davidoff	McLaren F1 GTR	BMW S70/2 6.0 L V12	M	2	(Germany) Thomas Bscher	1–7, 9–11
(United Kingdom) Gulf Team Davidoff	McLaren F1 GTR	BMW S70/2 6.0 L V12	M	2	(Denmark) John Nielsen	1–7, 9–11
(United Kingdom) Gulf Team Davidoff	McLaren F1 GTR	BMW S70/2 6.0 L V12	M	3	(France) Pierre-Henri Raphanel	1–2, 4–11
(United Kingdom) Gulf Team Davidoff	McLaren F1 GTR	BMW S70/2 6.0 L V12	M	3	(France) Jean-Marc Gounon	1–2, 4–5, 7–11
(United Kingdom) Gulf Team Davidoff	McLaren F1 GTR	BMW S70/2 6.0 L V12	M	3	(Sweden) Anders Olofsson	6–7
(United Kingdom) David Price Racing	Panoz GTR-1	Ford-Roush 6.0 L V8	G	4	(United Kingdom) Andy Wallace	1–2, 4–10
(United Kingdom) David Price Racing	Panoz GTR-1	Ford-Roush 6.0 L V8	G	4	(United Kingdom) James Weaver	1–2, 4–8
(United Kingdom) David Price Racing	Panoz GTR-1	Ford-Roush 6.0 L V8	G	4	(United States) Butch Leitzinger	7
(United Kingdom) David Price Racing	Panoz GTR-1	Ford-Roush 6.0 L V8	G	4	(France) Olivier Grouillard	9–11
(United Kingdom) David Price Racing	Panoz GTR-1	Ford-Roush 6.0 L V8	G	4	(United Kingdom) Perry McCarthy	11
(United Kingdom) David Price Racing	Panoz GTR-1	Ford-Roush 6.0 L V8	G	5	(Australia) David Brabham	1–2, 4–11
(United Kingdom) David Price Racing	Panoz GTR-1	Ford-Roush 6.0 L V8	G	5	(United Kingdom) Perry McCarthy	1–2, 4–10
(United Kingdom) David Price Racing	Panoz GTR-1	Ford-Roush 6.0 L V8	G	5	(France) Olivier Grouillard	7
(United Kingdom) David Price Racing	Panoz GTR-1	Ford-Roush 6.0 L V8	G	5	(United Kingdom) Andy Wallace	11
(Germany) Porsche AG	Porsche 911 GT1; Porsche 911 GT1 Evo	Porsche 3.2 L Turbo Flat-6	M	6	(Belgium) Thierry Boutsen	1–2, 4–11
(Germany) Porsche AG	Porsche 911 GT1; Porsche 911 GT1 Evo	Porsche 3.2 L Turbo Flat-6	M	6	(Germany) Hans-Joachim Stuck	1–2, 4–5, 7–8, 10–11
(Germany) Porsche AG	Porsche 911 GT1; Porsche 911 GT1 Evo	Porsche 3.2 L Turbo Flat-6	M	6	(France) Bob Wollek	6–7
(Germany) Porsche AG	Porsche 911 GT1; Porsche 911 GT1 Evo	Porsche 3.2 L Turbo Flat-6	M	6	(Germany) Ralf Kelleners	9
(Germany) Porsche AG	Porsche 911 GT1; Porsche 911 GT1 Evo	Porsche 3.2 L Turbo Flat-6	M	7	(France) Yannick Dalmas	4–11
(Germany) Porsche AG	Porsche 911 GT1; Porsche 911 GT1 Evo	Porsche 3.2 L Turbo Flat-6	M	7	(France) Bob Wollek	4–5, 8–11
(Germany) Porsche AG	Porsche 911 GT1; Porsche 911 GT1 Evo	Porsche 3.2 L Turbo Flat-6	M	7	(Belgium) Thierry Boutsen	5
(Germany) Porsche AG	Porsche 911 GT1; Porsche 911 GT1 Evo	Porsche 3.2 L Turbo Flat-6	M	7	(United Kingdom) Allan McNish	6–7
(Germany) Porsche AG	Porsche 911 GT1; Porsche 911 GT1 Evo	Porsche 3.2 L Turbo Flat-6	M	7	(Portugal) Pedro Lamy	7
(Germany) Porsche AG	Porsche 911 GT1; Porsche 911 GT1 Evo	Porsche 3.2 L Turbo Flat-6	M	47	(Germany) Ralf Kelleners	11
(Germany) Porsche AG	Porsche 911 GT1; Porsche 911 GT1 Evo	Porsche 3.2 L Turbo Flat-6	M	47	(United Kingdom) Allan McNish	11
(Germany) Team BMW Motorsport	McLaren F1 GTR	BMW S70/2 6.0 L V12	M	8	(United Kingdom) Steve Soper	All
(Germany) Team BMW Motorsport	McLaren F1 GTR	BMW S70/2 6.0 L V12	M	8	(Finland) JJ Lehto	1–10
(Germany) Team BMW Motorsport	McLaren F1 GTR	BMW S70/2 6.0 L V12	M	8	(Italy) Roberto Ravaglia	11
(Germany) Team BMW Motorsport	McLaren F1 GTR	BMW S70/2 6.0 L V12	M	9	(Netherlands) Peter Kox	All
(Germany) Team BMW Motorsport	McLaren F1 GTR	BMW S70/2 6.0 L V12	M	9	(Italy) Roberto Ravaglia	1–10
(Germany) Team BMW Motorsport	McLaren F1 GTR	BMW S70/2 6.0 L V12	M	9	(Finland) JJ Lehto	11
(Germany) AMG-Mercedes	Mercedes-Benz CLK GTR	Mercedes-Benz GT112 6.0 L V12	B	10	(Italy) Alessandro Nannini	All
(Germany) AMG-Mercedes	Mercedes-Benz CLK GTR	Mercedes-Benz GT112 6.0 L V12	B	10	(Germany) Marcel Tiemann	1–2, 4–11
(Germany) AMG-Mercedes	Mercedes-Benz CLK GTR	Mercedes-Benz GT112 6.0 L V12	B	10	(Germany) Klaus Ludwig	3
(Germany) AMG-Mercedes	Mercedes-Benz CLK GTR	Mercedes-Benz GT112 6.0 L V12	B	10	(Germany) Bernd Schneider	7
(Germany) AMG-Mercedes	Mercedes-Benz CLK GTR	Mercedes-Benz GT112 6.0 L V12	B	11	(Germany) Bernd Schneider	All
(Germany) AMG-Mercedes	Mercedes-Benz CLK GTR	Mercedes-Benz GT112 6.0 L V12	B	11	(Austria) Alexander Wurz	1–3, 5–9
(Germany) AMG-Mercedes	Mercedes-Benz CLK GTR	Mercedes-Benz GT112 6.0 L V12	B	11	(Germany) Klaus Ludwig	4, 10–11
(Germany) AMG-Mercedes	Mercedes-Benz CLK GTR	Mercedes-Benz GT112 6.0 L V12	B	11	(Japan) Aguri Suzuki	7
(Germany) AMG-Mercedes	Mercedes-Benz CLK GTR	Mercedes-Benz GT112 6.0 L V12	B	12	(Germany) Bernd Mayländer	4, 6–9
(Germany) AMG-Mercedes	Mercedes-Benz CLK GTR	Mercedes-Benz GT112 6.0 L V12	B	12	(Germany) Klaus Ludwig	4–9
(Germany) AMG-Mercedes	Mercedes-Benz CLK GTR	Mercedes-Benz GT112 6.0 L V12	B	12	(Germany) Ralf Schumacher	5
(Germany) AMG-Mercedes	Mercedes-Benz CLK GTR	Mercedes-Benz GT112 6.0 L V12	B	12	(Germany) Bernd Schneider	6
(Germany) AMG-Mercedes	Mercedes-Benz CLK GTR	Mercedes-Benz GT112 6.0 L V12	B	12	(Austria) Alexander Wurz	10–11
(Germany) AMG-Mercedes	Mercedes-Benz CLK GTR	Mercedes-Benz GT112 6.0 L V12	B	12	(Canada) Greg Moore	10–11
(United Kingdom) GT1 Lotus Racing Franck Muller	Lotus GT1	Chevrolet LT5 6.0 L V8	M	13	(France) Fabien Giroix	1–2, 4–6, 8, 10–11
(United Kingdom) GT1 Lotus Racing Franck Muller	Lotus GT1	Chevrolet LT5 6.0 L V8	M	13	(Switzerland) Jean-Denis Délétraz	1–2, 4–6, 8, 10–11
(United Kingdom) GT1 Lotus Racing Franck Muller	Lotus GT1	Chevrolet LT5 6.0 L V8	M	14	(Netherlands) Jan Lammers	1–2, 4–6, 8–11
(United Kingdom) GT1 Lotus Racing Franck Muller	Lotus GT1	Chevrolet LT5 6.0 L V8	M	14	(Netherlands) Mike Hezemans	1–2, 4–6, 8–11
(United Kingdom) GT1 Lotus Racing Franck Muller	Lotus GT1	Chevrolet LT5 6.0 L V8	M	14	(Italy) Max Angelelli	10–11
(United Kingdom) GT1 Lotus Racing Franck Muller (United Kingdom) First Racing Project (Note: Lotus No. 15 was entered by GT1 Lotus Racing Franck Muller for the first event of the season before switching to First Racing Project for the rest of the season.)	Lotus GT1	Chevrolet LT5 6.0 L V8	P	15	(Brazil) Maurizio Sandro Sala	1–2
(United Kingdom) GT1 Lotus Racing Franck Muller (United Kingdom) First Racing Project	Lotus GT1	Chevrolet LT5 6.0 L V8	P	15	(France) Jérôme Policand	1, 5, 7
(United Kingdom) GT1 Lotus Racing Franck Muller (United Kingdom) First Racing Project	Lotus GT1	Chevrolet LT5 6.0 L V8	P	15	(Thailand) Ratanakul Prutirat	2–5, 7
(United Kingdom) GT1 Lotus Racing Franck Muller (United Kingdom) First Racing Project	Lotus GT1	Chevrolet LT5 6.0 L V8	P	15	(France) Fabien Giroix	3, 7
(United Kingdom) GT1 Lotus Racing Franck Muller (United Kingdom) First Racing Project	Lotus GT1	Chevrolet LT5 6.0 L V8	P	15	(Switzerland) Jean-Denis Délétraz	3
(United Kingdom) GT1 Lotus Racing Franck Muller (United Kingdom) First Racing Project	Lotus GT1	Chevrolet LT5 6.0 L V8	P	15	(Germany) Alexander Grau	4
(Germany) Roock Racing	Porsche 911 GT1	Porsche 3.2 L Turbo Flat-6	M	16	(Germany) Ralf Kelleners	1–7
(Germany) Roock Racing	Porsche 911 GT1	Porsche 3.2 L Turbo Flat-6	M	16	(France) Yannick Dalmas	1–2
(Germany) Roock Racing	Porsche 911 GT1	Porsche 3.2 L Turbo Flat-6	M	16	(Monaco) Stéphane Ortelli	3–5
(Germany) Roock Racing	Porsche 911 GT1	Porsche 3.2 L Turbo Flat-6	M	16	(Portugal) Pedro Chaves	4–6
(Germany) Roock Racing	Porsche 911 GT1	Porsche 3.2 L Turbo Flat-6	M	16	(France) Christophe Bouchut	7
(Germany) Roock Racing	Porsche 911 GT1	Porsche 3.2 L Turbo Flat-6	M	16	(Sweden) Carl Rosenblad	7
(France) JB Racing	Porsche 911 GT1	Porsche 3.2 L Turbo Flat-6	M	17	(France) Emmanuel Collard	1–2, 4–7, 9–11
(France) JB Racing	Porsche 911 GT1	Porsche 3.2 L Turbo Flat-6	M	17	(Germany) Jürgen von Gartzen	1–2, 4–5
(France) JB Racing	Porsche 911 GT1	Porsche 3.2 L Turbo Flat-6	M	17	(Italy) Mauro Baldi	6–7, 9–11
(France) JB Racing	Porsche 911 GT1	Porsche 3.2 L Turbo Flat-6	M	17	(France) Alain Ferté	7
(Germany) Schübel Rennsport	Porsche 911 GT1	Porsche 3.2 L Turbo Flat-6	M	18	(Portugal) Pedro Lamy	1–2
(Germany) Schübel Rennsport	Porsche 911 GT1	Porsche 3.2 L Turbo Flat-6	M	18	(France) Bob Wollek	1–2
(Germany) Martin Veyhle Racing	McLaren F1 GTR; Lotus GT1 (Note: Martin Veyhle Racing entered the first two rounds of the season with a McLaren before switching to a Lotus from round five onwards.)	BMW S70/2 6.1 L V12; Lotus Type-918 3.5 L Turbo V8	G	19	(Germany) Alexander Grau	1–2, 5–6, 8–9
(Germany) Martin Veyhle Racing	McLaren F1 GTR; Lotus GT1	BMW S70/2 6.1 L V12; Lotus Type-918 3.5 L Turbo V8	G	19	(Germany) Gerd Ruch	1–2
(Germany) Martin Veyhle Racing	McLaren F1 GTR; Lotus GT1	BMW S70/2 6.1 L V12; Lotus Type-918 3.5 L Turbo V8	G	19	(Germany) Alexander Burgstaller	1
(Germany) Martin Veyhle Racing	McLaren F1 GTR; Lotus GT1	BMW S70/2 6.1 L V12; Lotus Type-918 3.5 L Turbo V8	G	19	(Denmark) Kurt Thiim	5–6
(Germany) Martin Veyhle Racing	McLaren F1 GTR; Lotus GT1	BMW S70/2 6.1 L V12; Lotus Type-918 3.5 L Turbo V8	G	19	(Germany) Marco Werner	8–9
(France) DAMS Panoz	Panoz GTR-1	Ford-Roush 6.0 L V8	M	20	(France) Éric Bernard	1–2, 4–11
(France) DAMS Panoz	Panoz GTR-1	Ford-Roush 6.0 L V8	M	20	(France) Franck Lagorce	1–2, 4–11
(Germany) Kremer Racing	Porsche 911 GT1	Porsche 3.2 L Turbo Flat-6	G	21	(France) Christophe Bouchut	1, 4–5, 8–9
(Germany) Kremer Racing	Porsche 911 GT1	Porsche 3.2 L Turbo Flat-6	G	21	(Sweden) Carl Rosenblad	1, 4–5, 8–9
(Germany) Kremer Racing	Porsche 911 GT1	Porsche 3.2 L Turbo Flat-6	G	21	(Germany) Klaus Ludwig	1
(Italy) BMS Scuderia Italia	Porsche 911 GT1	Porsche 3.2 L Turbo Flat-6	P	22	(Italy) Pierluigi Martini	1–6, 8–9
(Italy) BMS Scuderia Italia	Porsche 911 GT1	Porsche 3.2 L Turbo Flat-6	P	22	(Italy) Christian Pescatori	1–6, 8–9
(United Kingdom) GBF UK Ltd.	Lotus GT1	Lotus Type-918 3.5 L Turbo V8	M	23	(Italy) Mimmo Schiattarella	1–4, 6, 8–9
(United Kingdom) GBF UK Ltd.	Lotus GT1	Lotus Type-918 3.5 L Turbo V8	M	23	(Italy) Luca Badoer	1–4, 6, 8–9
(United Kingdom) GBF UK Ltd.	Lotus GT1	Lotus Type-918 3.5 L Turbo V8	M	23	(Italy) Mauro Martini	1
(United Kingdom) GBF UK Ltd.	Lotus GT1	Lotus Type-918 3.5 L Turbo V8	M	24	(Italy) Andrea Boldrini	2–4, 6
(United Kingdom) GBF UK Ltd.	Lotus GT1	Lotus Type-918 3.5 L Turbo V8	M	24	(Italy) Mauro Martini	2–3
(United Kingdom) GBF UK Ltd.	Lotus GT1	Lotus Type-918 3.5 L Turbo V8	M	24	(United Kingdom) Martin Stretton	4
(United Kingdom) GBF UK Ltd.	Lotus GT1	Lotus Type-918 3.5 L Turbo V8	M	24	(Austria) Ralf Kalaschek	6, 8–9
(United Kingdom) GBF UK Ltd.	Lotus GT1	Lotus Type-918 3.5 L Turbo V8	M	24	(Italy) Max Angelelli	8–9
(United Kingdom) GBF UK Ltd.	Lotus GT1	Lotus Type-918 3.5 L Turbo V8	M	24	(United Kingdom) Jason Yeomans	8
(United Kingdom) GBF UK Ltd.	Lotus GT1	Lotus Type-918 3.5 L Turbo V8	M	24	(Italy) Davide Campana	9
(France) BBA Compétition	McLaren F1 GTR	BMW S70/2 6.1 L V12	D	25	(France) Jean-Luc Maury-Laribière	1, 4–5, 7
(France) BBA Compétition	McLaren F1 GTR	BMW S70/2 6.1 L V12	D	25	(France) Olivier Thévenin	1
(France) BBA Compétition	McLaren F1 GTR	BMW S70/2 6.1 L V12	D	25	(France) David Velay	4–5
(France) BBA Compétition	McLaren F1 GTR	BMW S70/2 6.1 L V12	D	25	(France) Bernard Chauvin	5
(France) BBA Compétition	McLaren F1 GTR	BMW S70/2 6.1 L V12	D	25	(Japan) Jun Harada	7
(France) BBA Compétition	McLaren F1 GTR	BMW S70/2 6.1 L V12	D	25	(Japan) Tomiko Yoshikawa	7
(Germany) Konrad Motorsport	Porsche 911 GT1	Porsche 3.2 L Turbo Flat-6	P	26	(Italy) Mauro Baldi	2–5
(Germany) Konrad Motorsport	Porsche 911 GT1	Porsche 3.2 L Turbo Flat-6	P	26	(Austria) Franz Konrad	2–3
(Germany) Konrad Motorsport	Porsche 911 GT1	Porsche 3.2 L Turbo Flat-6	P	26	(Italy) Max Angelelli	3, 5
(Germany) Konrad Motorsport	Porsche 911 GT1	Porsche 3.2 L Turbo Flat-6	P	26	(Germany) Gerd Ruch	4
(Germany) Konrad Motorsport	Porsche 911 GT1	Porsche 3.2 L Turbo Flat-6	P	26	(Italy) Ivan Capelli	4
(United Kingdom) Parabolica Motorsport	McLaren F1 GTR	BMW S70/2 6.0 L V12	M	27	(United Kingdom) Chris Goodwin	2, 4–9, 11
(United Kingdom) Parabolica Motorsport	McLaren F1 GTR	BMW S70/2 6.0 L V12	M	27	(United Kingdom) Gary Ayles	2, 4–9, 11
(United Kingdom) Parabolica Motorsport	McLaren F1 GTR	BMW S70/2 6.0 L V12	M	27	(Sweden) Stefan Johansson	7
(United Kingdom) Newcastle United Lister	Lister Storm GTL	Jaguar 7.0 L V12	D	29	(Belgium) Eric van de Poele	10–11
(United Kingdom) Newcastle United Lister	Lister Storm GTL	Jaguar 7.0 L V12	D	29	(United Kingdom) Julian Bailey	10–11
(United Kingdom) G-Force Strandell	Porsche 911 GT1	Porsche 3.2 L Turbo Flat-6	D	30	(United Kingdom) Geoff Lister	8, 10–11
(United Kingdom) G-Force Strandell	Porsche 911 GT1	Porsche 3.2 L Turbo Flat-6	D	30	(United Kingdom) John Greasley	8, 10–11
(United Kingdom) G-Force Strandell	Porsche 911 GT1	Porsche 3.2 L Turbo Flat-6	D	30	(Sweden) Magnus Wallinder	8, 10–11
(Austria) Karl Augustin	Porsche 911 GT2 Evo	Porsche 3.6 L Turbo Flat-6	G	31	(Italy) Stefano Buttiero	1–6, 8–9
(Austria) Karl Augustin	Porsche 911 GT2 Evo	Porsche 3.6 L Turbo Flat-6	G	31	(Austria) Horst Felbermayr	1–3, 5–6, 8–9
(Austria) Karl Augustin	Porsche 911 GT2 Evo	Porsche 3.6 L Turbo Flat-6	G	31	(Austria) Karl Augustin	1–3
(Austria) Karl Augustin	Porsche 911 GT2 Evo	Porsche 3.6 L Turbo Flat-6	G	31	(Austria) Hans-Jörg Hofer	4–5, 9
(Austria) Karl Augustin	Porsche 911 GT2 Evo	Porsche 3.6 L Turbo Flat-6	G	31	(Germany) Stefan Roitmayer	4
(Austria) Karl Augustin	Porsche 911 GT2 Evo	Porsche 3.6 L Turbo Flat-6	G	31	(Austria) Horst Felbermayr Jr.	6, 8
(France) Graham Racing	Venturi 600LM	Renault PRV 3.0 L Turbo V6		32	(France) Éric Graham	1
(France) Graham Racing	Venturi 600LM	Renault PRV 3.0 L Turbo V6		32	(France) David Velay	1
(Japan) IDC Ootsukakagu SARD	SARD MC8-R	Toyota 1UZ-FE 4.0 L Turbo V8	Y	39	(Japan) Tatsuya Tanigawa	7
(Japan) IDC Ootsukakagu SARD	SARD MC8-R	Toyota 1UZ-FE 4.0 L Turbo V8	Y	39	(Japan) Yuji Tachikawa	7
(Japan) IDC Ootsukakagu SARD	SARD MC8-R	Toyota 1UZ-FE 4.0 L Turbo V8	Y	39	(Japan) Yasutaki Hinoi	7
(Japan) Team Menicon SARD	SARD MC8-R	Toyota 1UZ-FE 4.0 L Turbo V8	Y	46	(Japan) Masami Kageyama	7
(Japan) Team Menicon SARD	SARD MC8-R	Toyota 1UZ-FE 4.0 L Turbo V8	Y	46	(Japan) Tetsuya Tanaka	7
(Japan) Team Lark McLaren	McLaren F1 GTR	BMW S70/2 6.0 L V12	M	44	(Japan) Keiichi Tsuchiya	7
(Japan) Team Lark McLaren	McLaren F1 GTR	BMW S70/2 6.0 L V12	M	44	(Japan) Masanori Sekiya	7
(Japan) Team Lark McLaren	McLaren F1 GTR	BMW S70/2 6.0 L V12	M	44	(Japan) Akihiko Nakaya	7

=== GT2 ===
Entrant	Car	Engine	Tyre	No.	Drivers	Rounds
(United Kingdom) Agusta Racing Team	Callaway Corvette GT2 LM; Porsche 911 GT2 (Note: Agusta Racing Team entered a Callaway for the first four rounds of the championship, before switching to a Porsche for the rest of the season.)	Chevrolet 6.0 L V8; Porsche 3.6 L Turbo Flat-6	D	50	(Italy) Rocky Agusta	1–2, 4–5
(United Kingdom) Agusta Racing Team	Callaway Corvette GT2 LM; Porsche 911 GT2	Chevrolet 6.0 L V8; Porsche 3.6 L Turbo Flat-6	D	50	(Italy) Almo Coppelli	1–2, 4
(United Kingdom) Agusta Racing Team	Callaway Corvette GT2 LM; Porsche 911 GT2	Chevrolet 6.0 L V8; Porsche 3.6 L Turbo Flat-6	D	50	(Belgium) Michel Neugarten	5, 8
(United Kingdom) Agusta Racing Team	Callaway Corvette GT2 LM; Porsche 911 GT2	Chevrolet 6.0 L V8; Porsche 3.6 L Turbo Flat-6	D	50	(Belgium) Bernard de Dryver	5
(United Kingdom) Agusta Racing Team	Callaway Corvette GT2 LM; Porsche 911 GT2	Chevrolet 6.0 L V8; Porsche 3.6 L Turbo Flat-6	D	50	(France) Michel Ligonnet	7
(United Kingdom) Agusta Racing Team	Callaway Corvette GT2 LM; Porsche 911 GT2	Chevrolet 6.0 L V8; Porsche 3.6 L Turbo Flat-6	D	50	(Italy) Luca Drudi	7
(United Kingdom) Agusta Racing Team	Callaway Corvette GT2 LM; Porsche 911 GT2	Chevrolet 6.0 L V8; Porsche 3.6 L Turbo Flat-6	D	50	(Japan) Masahiro Kimoto	7
(United Kingdom) Agusta Racing Team	Callaway Corvette GT2 LM; Porsche 911 GT2	Chevrolet 6.0 L V8; Porsche 3.6 L Turbo Flat-6	D	50	(France) Patrice Goueslard	8
(United Kingdom) Agusta Racing Team	Callaway Corvette GT2 LM; Porsche 911 GT2	Chevrolet 6.0 L V8; Porsche 3.6 L Turbo Flat-6	D	50	(Italy) Luigino Pagotto	8
(France) Viper Team Oreca	Chrysler Viper GTS-R	Chrysler 356-T6 8.0 L V10	M	51	(Monaco) Olivier Beretta	1–2, 4–11
(France) Viper Team Oreca	Chrysler Viper GTS-R	Chrysler 356-T6 8.0 L V10	M	51	(France) Philippe Gache	1–2, 4–11
(France) Viper Team Oreca	Chrysler Viper GTS-R	Chrysler 356-T6 8.0 L V10	M	52	(United Kingdom) Justin Bell	1–2, 4–11
(France) Viper Team Oreca	Chrysler Viper GTS-R	Chrysler 356-T6 8.0 L V10	M	52	(United States) Tommy Archer	1–2, 7, 10–11
(France) Viper Team Oreca	Chrysler Viper GTS-R	Chrysler 356-T6 8.0 L V10	M	52	(Belgium) Marc Duez	4–5
(France) Viper Team Oreca	Chrysler Viper GTS-R	Chrysler 356-T6 8.0 L V10	M	52	(Austria) Dieter Quester	6
(France) Viper Team Oreca	Chrysler Viper GTS-R	Chrysler 356-T6 8.0 L V10	M	52	(Japan) Hideshi Matsuda	7
(France) Viper Team Oreca	Chrysler Viper GTS-R	Chrysler 356-T6 8.0 L V10	M	52	(Italy) Luca Drudi	8–9
(United Kingdom) Chamberlain Engineering	Chrysler Viper GTS-R	Chrysler 356-T6 8.0 L V10	G	53	(Finland) Jari Nurminen	1–3
(United Kingdom) Chamberlain Engineering	Chrysler Viper GTS-R	Chrysler 356-T6 8.0 L V10	G	53	(Netherlands) Hans Hugenholtz Jr.	1–2, 4–5
(United Kingdom) Chamberlain Engineering	Chrysler Viper GTS-R	Chrysler 356-T6 8.0 L V10	G	53	(Finland) Pertti Lievonen	3
(United Kingdom) Chamberlain Engineering	Chrysler Viper GTS-R	Chrysler 356-T6 8.0 L V10	G	53	(Republic of Ireland) Tim O'Kennedy	4–5
(United Kingdom) Chamberlain Engineering	Chrysler Viper GTS-R	Chrysler 356-T6 8.0 L V10	G	53	(United Kingdom) David Goode	4, 8
(United Kingdom) Chamberlain Engineering	Chrysler Viper GTS-R	Chrysler 356-T6 8.0 L V10	G	53	(Germany) Gerd Ruch	6
(United Kingdom) Chamberlain Engineering	Chrysler Viper GTS-R	Chrysler 356-T6 8.0 L V10	G	53	(Italy) Almo Coppelli	6
(United Kingdom) Chamberlain Engineering	Chrysler Viper GTS-R	Chrysler 356-T6 8.0 L V10	G	53	(Italy) Leonardo Maddelena	6, 8–9
(United Kingdom) Chamberlain Engineering	Chrysler Viper GTS-R	Chrysler 356-T6 8.0 L V10	G	53	(Japan) Manabu Orido	7
(United Kingdom) Chamberlain Engineering	Chrysler Viper GTS-R	Chrysler 356-T6 8.0 L V10	G	53	(Japan) Naohiro Kawano	7
(United Kingdom) Chamberlain Engineering	Chrysler Viper GTS-R	Chrysler 356-T6 8.0 L V10	G	53	(Japan) Yukihiro Hane	7
(United Kingdom) Chamberlain Engineering	Chrysler Viper GTS-R	Chrysler 356-T6 8.0 L V10	G	53	(Australia) Paul Thomas	8
(United Kingdom) Chamberlain Engineering	Chrysler Viper GTS-R	Chrysler 356-T6 8.0 L V10	G	53	(Italy) Renato Mastropietro	9
(United Kingdom) Chamberlain Engineering	Chrysler Viper GTS-R	Chrysler 356-T6 8.0 L V10	G	53	(Italy) Piergiuseppe Pironi	9
(United Kingdom) Chamberlain Engineering	Chrysler Viper GTS-R	Chrysler 356-T6 8.0 L V10	G	53	(United States) Zak Brown	10
(United Kingdom) Chamberlain Engineering	Chrysler Viper GTS-R	Chrysler 356-T6 8.0 L V10	G	53	(United States) Chris Gleason	10
(United Kingdom) Chamberlain Engineering	Chrysler Viper GTS-R	Chrysler 356-T6 8.0 L V10	G	53	(United States) Rick Fairbanks	10
(United Kingdom) Chamberlain Engineering	Chrysler Viper GTS-R	Chrysler 356-T6 8.0 L V10	G	53	(United States) Shane Lewis	11
(United Kingdom) Chamberlain Engineering	Chrysler Viper GTS-R	Chrysler 356-T6 8.0 L V10	G	53	(United States) Tim Moser	11
(United Kingdom) Chamberlain Engineering	Chrysler Viper GTS-R	Chrysler 356-T6 8.0 L V10	G	53	(France) Patrick Vuillaume	11
(United Kingdom) Chamberlain Engineering	Chrysler Viper GTS-R	Chrysler 356-T6 8.0 L V10	G	54	(United Kingdom) Peter Hardman	2
(United Kingdom) Chamberlain Engineering	Chrysler Viper GTS-R	Chrysler 356-T6 8.0 L V10	G	54	(United Kingdom) Richard Dean	2, 11
(United Kingdom) Chamberlain Engineering	Chrysler Viper GTS-R	Chrysler 356-T6 8.0 L V10	G	54	(Republic of Ireland) Tim O'Kennedy	8, 10–11
(United Kingdom) Chamberlain Engineering	Chrysler Viper GTS-R	Chrysler 356-T6 8.0 L V10	G	54	(Netherlands) Hans Hugenholtz Jr.	8
(United Kingdom) Chamberlain Engineering	Chrysler Viper GTS-R	Chrysler 356-T6 8.0 L V10	G	54	(Germany) Wido Rössler	8
(United Kingdom) Chamberlain Engineering	Chrysler Viper GTS-R	Chrysler 356-T6 8.0 L V10	G	54	(United States) Peter Halsmer	10
(United Kingdom) Chamberlain Engineering	Chrysler Viper GTS-R	Chrysler 356-T6 8.0 L V10	G	54	(United States) Matthew Cohen	10
(Austria) Karl Augustin	Porsche 911 GT2	Porsche 3.6 L Turbo Flat-6	G	55	(Germany) Helmut Reis	1–7
(Austria) Karl Augustin	Porsche 911 GT2	Porsche 3.6 L Turbo Flat-6	G	55	(Austria) Hans-Jörg Hofer	1–2
(Austria) Karl Augustin	Porsche 911 GT2	Porsche 3.6 L Turbo Flat-6	G	55	(Germany) Wido Rössler	1, 3–7, 10–11
(Austria) Karl Augustin	Porsche 911 GT2	Porsche 3.6 L Turbo Flat-6	G	55	(Austria) Manfred Jurasz	3–6
(Austria) Karl Augustin	Porsche 911 GT2	Porsche 3.6 L Turbo Flat-6	G	55	(Germany) Ernst Gschwender	7, 9
(Austria) Karl Augustin	Porsche 911 GT2	Porsche 3.6 L Turbo Flat-6	G	55	(Germany) Wolfgang Kaufmann	9–11
(Germany) Roock Racing	Porsche 911 GT2	Porsche 3.6 L Turbo Flat-6	M	56	(Switzerland) Bruno Eichmann	All
(Germany) Roock Racing	Porsche 911 GT2	Porsche 3.6 L Turbo Flat-6	M	56	(Portugal) Ni Amorim	1–7
(Germany) Roock Racing	Porsche 911 GT2	Porsche 3.6 L Turbo Flat-6	M	56	(Germany) Claudia Hürtgen	1–5, 7–10
(Germany) Roock Racing	Porsche 911 GT2	Porsche 3.6 L Turbo Flat-6	M	56	(Monaco) Stéphane Ortelli	8–9, 11
(Germany) Roock Racing	Porsche 911 GT2	Porsche 3.6 L Turbo Flat-6	M	57	(France) François Lefon	1–3, 5, 8
(Germany) Roock Racing	Porsche 911 GT2	Porsche 3.6 L Turbo Flat-6	M	57	(France) Jean-Marc Smadja	1–2, 5
(Germany) Roock Racing	Porsche 911 GT2	Porsche 3.6 L Turbo Flat-6	M	57	(Monaco) Stéphane Ortelli	1–2, 4–6
(Germany) Roock Racing	Porsche 911 GT2	Porsche 3.6 L Turbo Flat-6	M	57	(France) Jean-Pierre Jarier	3
(Germany) Roock Racing	Porsche 911 GT2	Porsche 3.6 L Turbo Flat-6	M	57	(United Kingdom) Hugh Price	4
(Germany) Roock Racing	Porsche 911 GT2	Porsche 3.6 L Turbo Flat-6	M	57	(United Kingdom) John Robinson	4
(Germany) Roock Racing	Porsche 911 GT2	Porsche 3.6 L Turbo Flat-6	M	57	(Switzerland) Bruno Eichmann	6
(Germany) Roock Racing	Porsche 911 GT2	Porsche 3.6 L Turbo Flat-6	M	57	(Germany) Claudia Hürtgen	6, 11
(Germany) Roock Racing	Porsche 911 GT2	Porsche 3.6 L Turbo Flat-6	M	57	(Portugal) Pedro Chaves	7–9
(Germany) Roock Racing	Porsche 911 GT2	Porsche 3.6 L Turbo Flat-6	M	57	(United Kingdom) Robert Nearn	7
(Germany) Roock Racing	Porsche 911 GT2	Porsche 3.6 L Turbo Flat-6	M	57	(Japan) Hisashi Wada	7
(Germany) Roock Racing	Porsche 911 GT2	Porsche 3.6 L Turbo Flat-6	M	57	(Portugal) Ni Amorim	8–10
(Germany) Roock Racing	Porsche 911 GT2	Porsche 3.6 L Turbo Flat-6	M	57	(France) Patrice Goueslard	9
(Germany) Roock Racing	Porsche 911 GT2	Porsche 3.6 L Turbo Flat-6	M	57	(Germany) Uwe Alzen	10–11
(Germany) Roock Racing	Porsche 911 GT2	Porsche 3.6 L Turbo Flat-6	M	87	(United Kingdom) John Robinson	8–9, 11
(Germany) Roock Racing	Porsche 911 GT2	Porsche 3.6 L Turbo Flat-6	M	87	(United Kingdom) Richard Nearn	8
(Germany) Roock Racing	Porsche 911 GT2	Porsche 3.6 L Turbo Flat-6	M	87	(France) Michel Ligonnet	8
(Germany) Roock Racing	Porsche 911 GT2	Porsche 3.6 L Turbo Flat-6	M	87	(United Kingdom) Hugh Price	9, 11
(Germany) Roock Racing	Porsche 911 GT2	Porsche 3.6 L Turbo Flat-6	M	87	(Germany) Mike Martin	9
(Germany) Roock Racing	Porsche 911 GT2	Porsche 3.6 L Turbo Flat-6	M	87	(Germany) André Ahrlé	10–11
(Germany) Roock Racing	Porsche 911 GT2	Porsche 3.6 L Turbo Flat-6	M	87	(Portugal) Pedro Chaves	10
(Portugal) Estoril Racing Team	Porsche 911 GT2	Porsche 3.6 L Turbo Flat-6		58	(France) Manuel Monteiro	1–2, 4–5, 7, 9–11
(Portugal) Estoril Racing Team	Porsche 911 GT2	Porsche 3.6 L Turbo Flat-6		58	(France) Michel Monteiro	1–2, 4–5, 7, 9–11
(Portugal) Estoril Racing Team	Porsche 911 GT2	Porsche 3.6 L Turbo Flat-6		58	(Switzerland) Henri-Louis Maunoir	7
(Netherlands) Marcos Racing International	Marcos LM600	Chevrolet 5.9 L V8	D	59	(Netherlands) Cor Euser	All
(Netherlands) Marcos Racing International	Marcos LM600	Chevrolet 5.9 L V8	D	59	(Germany) Harald Becker	All
(Netherlands) Marcos Racing International	Marcos LM600	Chevrolet 5.9 L V8	D	59	(Netherlands) Herman Buurman	7
(Netherlands) Marcos Racing International	Marcos LM600	Chevrolet 5.9 L V8	D	60	(Netherlands) Toon van de Haterd	1
(Netherlands) Marcos Racing International	Marcos LM600	Chevrolet 5.9 L V8	D	60	(Netherlands) Bert Ploeg	1
(Netherlands) Marcos Racing International	Marcos LM600	Chevrolet 5.9 L V8	D	60	(United Kingdom) Christian Vann	2, 8
(Netherlands) Marcos Racing International	Marcos LM600	Chevrolet 5.9 L V8	D	60	(Netherlands) John Schumann	2
(Netherlands) Marcos Racing International	Marcos LM600	Chevrolet 5.9 L V8	D	60	(Finland) Ville-Pertti Teuronen	3
(Netherlands) Marcos Racing International	Marcos LM600	Chevrolet 5.9 L V8	D	60	(Finland) Teijo Lahti	3
(Netherlands) Marcos Racing International	Marcos LM600	Chevrolet 5.9 L V8	D	60	(Brazil) Thomas Erdos	8
(Netherlands) Marcos Racing International	Marcos LM600	Chevrolet 5.9 L V8	D	60	(Italy) Marco Simoncini	9
(Netherlands) Marcos Racing International	Marcos LM600	Chevrolet 5.9 L V8	D	60	(Belgium) Alfons Taels	9
(Netherlands) Marcos Racing International	Marcos LM600	Chevrolet 5.9 L V8	D	60	(Netherlands) Martijn Koene	10–11
(Netherlands) Marcos Racing International	Marcos LM600	Chevrolet 5.9 L V8	D	60	(Italy) Angelo Zadra	10
(Netherlands) Marcos Racing International	Marcos LM600	Chevrolet 5.9 L V8	D	60	(New Zealand) Rob Wilson	11
(Switzerland) Stadler Motorsport	Porsche 911 GT2	Porsche 3.6 L Turbo Flat-6	P	61	(Switzerland) Enzo Calderari	1, 4, 10–11
(Switzerland) Stadler Motorsport	Porsche 911 GT2	Porsche 3.6 L Turbo Flat-6	P	61	(Switzerland) Lilian Bryner	1, 4, 10–11
(Switzerland) Stadler Motorsport	Porsche 911 GT2	Porsche 3.6 L Turbo Flat-6	P	61	(Germany) Ulli Richter	4, 11
(Switzerland) Stadler Motorsport	Porsche 911 GT2	Porsche 3.6 L Turbo Flat-6	P	62	(Switzerland) Denis Lay	1–2, 4–5, 7, 9–11
(Switzerland) Stadler Motorsport	Porsche 911 GT2	Porsche 3.6 L Turbo Flat-6	P	62	(Germany) Axel Röhr	1–2, 4–5, 9
(Switzerland) Stadler Motorsport	Porsche 911 GT2	Porsche 3.6 L Turbo Flat-6	P	62	(Switzerland) Uwe Sick	1–2, 5, 7, 9–11
(Switzerland) Stadler Motorsport	Porsche 911 GT2	Porsche 3.6 L Turbo Flat-6	P	62	(Switzerland) Bruno Michelotti	4
(Switzerland) Stadler Motorsport	Porsche 911 GT2	Porsche 3.6 L Turbo Flat-6	P	62	(Switzerland) Franz Hunkeler	7
(Germany) Krauss Motorsport	Porsche 911 GT2	Porsche 3.6 L Turbo Flat-6	P	63	(Germany) Bernhard Müller	1–6, 8–11
(Germany) Krauss Motorsport	Porsche 911 GT2	Porsche 3.6 L Turbo Flat-6	P	63	(Germany) Michael Trunk	1–6, 8–11
(Germany) Krauss Motorsport	Porsche 911 GT2	Porsche 3.6 L Turbo Flat-6	P	63	(United Kingdom) Nigel Smith	7
(Germany) Krauss Motorsport	Porsche 911 GT2	Porsche 3.6 L Turbo Flat-6	P	63	(Japan) Takashi Suzuki	7
(Germany) Krauss Motorsport	Porsche 911 GT2	Porsche 3.6 L Turbo Flat-6	P	63	(Japan) Sumio Sakurai	7
(Germany) Kremer Racing	Porsche 911 GT2	Porsche 3.6 L Turbo Flat-6	G	64	(Spain) Tomás Saldaña	1–2, 6, 8–9
(Germany) Kremer Racing	Porsche 911 GT2	Porsche 3.6 L Turbo Flat-6	G	64	(Spain) Alfonso de Orléans-Borbón	1–2, 6, 8–9
(Germany) Kremer Racing	Porsche 911 GT2	Porsche 3.6 L Turbo Flat-6	G	64	(Sweden) Carl Rosenblad	2
(Germany) Kremer Racing	Porsche 911 GT2	Porsche 3.6 L Turbo Flat-6	G	64	(France) Christophe Bouchut	6
(Germany) RWS	Porsche 911 GT2	Porsche 3.6 L Turbo Flat-6		65	(Italy) Raffaele Sangiuolo	1–2, 4–6, 9
(Germany) RWS	Porsche 911 GT2	Porsche 3.6 L Turbo Flat-6		65	(Italy) Luca Riccitelli	1–2, 4–6, 9
(Germany) RWS	Porsche 911 GT2	Porsche 3.6 L Turbo Flat-6		65	(Germany) Wolfgang Münster	1
(Germany) RWS	Porsche 911 GT2	Porsche 3.6 L Turbo Flat-6		65	(Switzerland) Charles Margueron	2
(Germany) RWS	Porsche 911 GT2	Porsche 3.6 L Turbo Flat-6		65	(Germany) Benno Rottenfusser	5–6
(Germany) RWS	Porsche 911 GT2	Porsche 3.6 L Turbo Flat-6		65	(Italy) Mario Spagnoli	9
(Germany) Konrad Motorsport	Porsche 911 GT2	Porsche 3.6 L Turbo Flat-6	P	66	(Austria) Franz Konrad	1, 4–8, 10–11
(Germany) Konrad Motorsport	Porsche 911 GT2	Porsche 3.6 L Turbo Flat-6	P	66	(Austria) Philipp Peter	1
(Germany) Konrad Motorsport	Porsche 911 GT2	Porsche 3.6 L Turbo Flat-6	P	66	(Germany) Uwe Alzen	1
(Germany) Konrad Motorsport	Porsche 911 GT2	Porsche 3.6 L Turbo Flat-6	P	66	(Switzerland) Toni Seiler	2–6, 8–11
(Germany) Konrad Motorsport	Porsche 911 GT2	Porsche 3.6 L Turbo Flat-6	P	66	(Italy) Marco Spinelli	2–3, 9
(Germany) Konrad Motorsport	Porsche 911 GT2	Porsche 3.6 L Turbo Flat-6	P	66	(United Kingdom) Richard Nearn	2
(Germany) Konrad Motorsport	Porsche 911 GT2	Porsche 3.6 L Turbo Flat-6	P	66	(France) Michel Ligonnet	3
(Germany) Konrad Motorsport	Porsche 911 GT2	Porsche 3.6 L Turbo Flat-6	P	66	(Netherlands) Bert Ploeg	4
(Germany) Konrad Motorsport	Porsche 911 GT2	Porsche 3.6 L Turbo Flat-6	P	66	(Germany) Gerd Ruch	5
(Germany) Konrad Motorsport	Porsche 911 GT2	Porsche 3.6 L Turbo Flat-6	P	66	(Germany) Wolfgang Kaufmann	7
(Germany) Konrad Motorsport	Porsche 911 GT2	Porsche 3.6 L Turbo Flat-6	P	66	(Japan) Seiichi Sodeyama	7
(Germany) Konrad Motorsport	Porsche 911 GT2	Porsche 3.6 L Turbo Flat-6	P	66	(Germany) André Ahrlé	8
(Germany) Konrad Motorsport	Porsche 911 GT2	Porsche 3.6 L Turbo Flat-6	P	66	(United States) Nick Ham	11
(Germany) Konrad Motorsport	Porsche 911 GT2	Porsche 3.6 L Turbo Flat-6	P	67	(Italy) Marco Spinelli	1, 5
(Germany) Konrad Motorsport	Porsche 911 GT2	Porsche 3.6 L Turbo Flat-6	P	67	(France) Michel Ligonnet	1
(Germany) Konrad Motorsport	Porsche 911 GT2	Porsche 3.6 L Turbo Flat-6	P	67	(Switzerland) Toni Seiler	1
(Germany) Konrad Motorsport	Porsche 911 GT2	Porsche 3.6 L Turbo Flat-6	P	67	(United States) Kelly Collins	5
(Germany) Konrad Motorsport	Porsche 911 GT2	Porsche 3.6 L Turbo Flat-6	P	67	(United States) Barry Waddell	5
(Germany) Konrad Motorsport	Porsche 911 GT2	Porsche 3.6 L Turbo Flat-6	P	67	(United States) Martin Snow	10
(Germany) Konrad Motorsport	Porsche 911 GT2	Porsche 3.6 L Turbo Flat-6	P	67	(Czech Republic) Karel Dolejší	10
(Italy) Angelo Zadra	Porsche 911 GT2	Porsche 3.6 L Turbo Flat-6	P	68	(Italy) Angelo Zadra	1–2, 4–5, 9
(Italy) Angelo Zadra	Porsche 911 GT2	Porsche 3.6 L Turbo Flat-6	P	68	(Italy) Leonardo Maddalena	1–2, 4–5
(Italy) Angelo Zadra	Porsche 911 GT2	Porsche 3.6 L Turbo Flat-6	P	68	(Italy) Marco Brand	1
(Italy) Angelo Zadra	Porsche 911 GT2	Porsche 3.6 L Turbo Flat-6	P	68	(Italy) Renato Mastropietro	2, 4–5
(Italy) Angelo Zadra	Porsche 911 GT2	Porsche 3.6 L Turbo Flat-6	P	68	(Austria) Philipp Peter	9
(Germany) Proton Competition	Porsche 911 GT2	Porsche 3.6 L Turbo Flat-6	P	69	(Germany) Gerold Ried	All
(Germany) Proton Competition	Porsche 911 GT2	Porsche 3.6 L Turbo Flat-6	P	69	(France) Patrick Vuillaume	1–10
(Germany) Proton Competition	Porsche 911 GT2	Porsche 3.6 L Turbo Flat-6	P	69	(Germany) Ernst Gschwinder	1
(Germany) Proton Competition	Porsche 911 GT2	Porsche 3.6 L Turbo Flat-6	P	69	(Austria) Manfred Jurasz	7–11
(Germany) Dellenbach Motorsport	Porsche 911 GT2	Porsche 3.6 L Turbo Flat-6	D	70	(Germany) Rainer Bonnetsmüller	1–2, 4, 6, 8–11
(Germany) Dellenbach Motorsport	Porsche 911 GT2	Porsche 3.6 L Turbo Flat-6	D	70	(Austria) Manfred Jurasz	1–2
(Germany) Dellenbach Motorsport	Porsche 911 GT2	Porsche 3.6 L Turbo Flat-6	D	70	(Germany) Günther Blieninger	1, 4–6, 8–9
(Germany) Dellenbach Motorsport	Porsche 911 GT2	Porsche 3.6 L Turbo Flat-6	D	70	(Austria) Wolfgang Treml	4–5
(Germany) Dellenbach Motorsport	Porsche 911 GT2	Porsche 3.6 L Turbo Flat-6	D	70	(Germany) Klaus Horn	5–6, 8–11
(Switzerland) GT Racing Team	Porsche 911 GT2	Porsche 3.6 L Turbo Flat-6		71	(Italy) Luca Drudi	1, 4–6
(Switzerland) GT Racing Team	Porsche 911 GT2	Porsche 3.6 L Turbo Flat-6		71	(Italy) Luigino Pagotto	1, 4–6
(Switzerland) Elf Haberthur Racing	Porsche 911 GT2	Porsche 3.6 L Turbo Flat-6	D	72	(France) Jean-Claude Lagniez	1
(Switzerland) Elf Haberthur Racing	Porsche 911 GT2	Porsche 3.6 L Turbo Flat-6	D	72	(France) Guy Martinolle	1
(Switzerland) Elf Haberthur Racing	Porsche 911 GT2	Porsche 3.6 L Turbo Flat-6	D	72	(Belgium) Michel Neugarten	10–11
(Switzerland) Elf Haberthur Racing	Porsche 911 GT2	Porsche 3.6 L Turbo Flat-6	D	72	(France) Guy Ligonnet	10
(Switzerland) Elf Haberthur Racing	Porsche 911 GT2	Porsche 3.6 L Turbo Flat-6	D	72	(United States) Will Pace	10
(Switzerland) Elf Haberthur Racing	Porsche 911 GT2	Porsche 3.6 L Turbo Flat-6	D	72	(Belgium) Stéphane de Groodt	11
(Germany) Seikel Motorsport	Porsche 911 GT2	Porsche 3.6 L Turbo Flat-6		73	(Germany) Fred Rosterg	1, 4
(Germany) Seikel Motorsport	Porsche 911 GT2	Porsche 3.6 L Turbo Flat-6		73	(Italy) Ruggero Grassi	1
(Germany) Seikel Motorsport	Porsche 911 GT2	Porsche 3.6 L Turbo Flat-6		73	(Italy) Renato Mastropietro	1
(Germany) Seikel Motorsport	Porsche 911 GT2	Porsche 3.6 L Turbo Flat-6		73	(Germany) Wolfgang Haugg	4
(Germany) Seikel Motorsport	Porsche 911 GT2	Porsche 3.6 L Turbo Flat-6		73	(Italy) Giuseppe Quargenten	4
(Germany) Seikel Motorsport	Porsche 911 GT2	Porsche 3.6 L Turbo Flat-6		73	(Switzerland) Bruno Michelotti	9
(Germany) Seikel Motorsport	Porsche 911 GT2	Porsche 3.6 L Turbo Flat-6		73	(France) Jacques Corbet	9
(Germany) Seikel Motorsport	Porsche 911 GT2	Porsche 3.6 L Turbo Flat-6		73	(New Zealand) Andrew Bagnall	9
(United Kingdom) G-Force Strandell	Porsche 911 GT2	Porsche 3.6 L Turbo Flat-6	D	75	(United Kingdom) Geoff Lister	2, 4–5
(United Kingdom) G-Force Strandell	Porsche 911 GT2	Porsche 3.6 L Turbo Flat-6	D	75	(United Kingdom) John Greasley	2, 4–5
(United Kingdom) G-Force Strandell	Porsche 911 GT2	Porsche 3.6 L Turbo Flat-6	D	75	(Sweden) Magnus Wallinder	4–5
(United Kingdom) G-Force Strandell	Porsche 911 GT2	Porsche 3.6 L Turbo Flat-6	D	75	(United Kingdom) Nigel Barrett	8
(United Kingdom) G-Force Strandell	Porsche 911 GT2	Porsche 3.6 L Turbo Flat-6	D	75	(Sweden) Koit Veertee	8
(United Kingdom) Steve O'Rourke	Porsche 911 GT2	Porsche 3.6 L Flat-6	D	76	(United Kingdom) Steve O'Rourke	2
(United Kingdom) Steve O'Rourke	Porsche 911 GT2	Porsche 3.6 L Flat-6	D	76	(United Kingdom) Win Percy	2
(United Kingdom) Steve O'Rourke	Porsche 911 GT2	Porsche 3.6 L Flat-6	D	76	(United Kingdom) Tim Sugden	2
(United States) Saleen-Allen Speedlab (United Kingdom) Cirtek (Note: The No. 77, 78, and 79 Mustangs were entered by Saleen-Allen Speedlab for the start of the season before switching to Cirtek from round 8 onward. Saleen-Allen Speedlab later reentered the series with No. 95 for round 11.)	Saleen Mustang SR	Ford 5.9 L V8	D	77	(United States) Steve Saleen	2
(United States) Saleen-Allen Speedlab (United Kingdom) Cirtek	Saleen Mustang SR	Ford 5.9 L V8	D	77	(United States) Price Cobb	2
(United States) Saleen-Allen Speedlab (United Kingdom) Cirtek	Saleen Mustang SR	Ford 5.9 L V8	D	77	(Spain) Carlos Palau	2
(United States) Saleen-Allen Speedlab (United Kingdom) Cirtek	Saleen Mustang SR	Ford 5.9 L V8	D	77	(United Kingdom) Peter Owen	5, 8–10
(United States) Saleen-Allen Speedlab (United Kingdom) Cirtek	Saleen Mustang SR	Ford 5.9 L V8	D	77	(United Kingdom) James Kaye	5
(United States) Saleen-Allen Speedlab (United Kingdom) Cirtek	Saleen Mustang SR	Ford 5.9 L V8	D	77	(United Kingdom) Guy Smith	5
(United States) Saleen-Allen Speedlab (United Kingdom) Cirtek	Saleen Mustang SR	Ford 5.9 L V8	D	77	(United Kingdom) Mark Peters	8–9
(United States) Saleen-Allen Speedlab (United Kingdom) Cirtek	Saleen Mustang SR	Ford 5.9 L V8	D	77	(United Kingdom) Jonathan Baker	8
(United States) Saleen-Allen Speedlab (United Kingdom) Cirtek	Saleen Mustang SR	Ford 5.9 L V8	D	77	(United Kingdom) Robert Schirle	9–11
(United States) Saleen-Allen Speedlab (United Kingdom) Cirtek	Saleen Mustang SR	Ford 5.9 L V8	D	77	(United Kingdom) Christian Vann	10–11
(United States) Saleen-Allen Speedlab (United Kingdom) Cirtek	Saleen Mustang SR	Ford 5.9 L V8	D	78	(United Kingdom) Allen Lloyd	2, 5
(United States) Saleen-Allen Speedlab (United Kingdom) Cirtek	Saleen Mustang SR	Ford 5.9 L V8	D	78	(United Kingdom) Robert Schirle	2, 8
(United States) Saleen-Allen Speedlab (United Kingdom) Cirtek	Saleen Mustang SR	Ford 5.9 L V8	D	78	(United Kingdom) James Warnock	2, 8
(United States) Saleen-Allen Speedlab (United Kingdom) Cirtek	Saleen Mustang SR	Ford 5.9 L V8	D	78	(Brazil) Thomas Erdos	5
(United States) Saleen-Allen Speedlab (United Kingdom) Cirtek	Saleen Mustang SR	Ford 5.9 L V8	D	78	(United Kingdom) Richard Dean	8
(United States) Saleen-Allen Speedlab (United Kingdom) Cirtek	Saleen Mustang SR	Ford 5.9 L V8	D	79	(United Kingdom) Peter Owen	2
(United States) Saleen-Allen Speedlab (United Kingdom) Cirtek	Saleen Mustang SR	Ford 5.9 L V8	D	79	(United Kingdom) James Kaye	2
(United States) Saleen-Allen Speedlab (United Kingdom) Cirtek	Saleen Mustang SR	Ford 5.9 L V8	D	79	(United Kingdom) Richard Piper	2
(United Kingdom) Charles Morgan	Morgan Plus 8 GTR	Rover 3.9 L V8	D	80	(United Kingdom) William Wykeham	2–3, 5, 8, 10–11
(United Kingdom) Charles Morgan	Morgan Plus 8 GTR	Rover 3.9 L V8	D	80	(United Kingdom) Charles Morgan	2–3, 5, 8
(United Kingdom) Charles Morgan	Morgan Plus 8 GTR	Rover 3.9 L V8	D	80	(United Kingdom) Tony Dron	10
(United Kingdom) Charles Morgan	Morgan Plus 8 GTR	Rover 3.9 L V8	D	80	(United Kingdom) Mark Hales	11
(United Kingdom) Charles Morgan	Morgan Plus 8 GTR	Rover 3.9 L V8	D	80	(United Kingdom) David Vegher	11
(Germany) Michael Eschmann	Porsche 911 GT2	Porsche 3.6 L Turbo Flat-6		81	(Germany) Michael Eschmann	4
(Germany) Michael Eschmann	Porsche 911 GT2	Porsche 3.6 L Turbo Flat-6		81	(Germany) Paul Hulverscheid	4
(Germany) Michael Eschmann	Porsche 911 GT2	Porsche 3.6 L Turbo Flat-6		81	(Germany) Gunter Döbler	4
(United Kingdom) TVR	TVR Cerbera	TVR Speed Six 4.5 L I6	D	82	(United Kingdom) Colin Blower	8
(United Kingdom) TVR	TVR Cerbera	TVR Speed Six 4.5 L I6	D	82	(United Kingdom) Jamie Campbell-Walter	8
(France) Larbre Compétition	Porsche 911 GT2	Porsche 3.6 L Turbo Flat-6		83	(France) Patrice Goueslard	7
(France) Larbre Compétition	Porsche 911 GT2	Porsche 3.6 L Turbo Flat-6		83	(France) Jean-Luc Chéreau	7
(France) Larbre Compétition	Porsche 911 GT2	Porsche 3.6 L Turbo Flat-6		83	(France) Jack Leconte	7
(Japan) NSX Dream 28 Competition	Honda NSX	Honda 3.2 L V6		84	(Japan) Hajime Ooshiro	7
(Japan) NSX Dream 28 Competition	Honda NSX	Honda 3.2 L V6		84	(Japan) Masayoshi Furuya	7
(Japan) NSX Dream 28 Competition	Honda NSX	Honda 3.2 L V6		84	(Japan) Shigekazu Saeki	7
(Japan) Team Signal	Nissan Silvia	Nissan SR20DET 2.0 L Turbo I4		85	(Japan) Takeshi Yuasa	7
(Japan) Team Signal	Nissan Silvia	Nissan SR20DET 2.0 L Turbo I4		85	(Japan) Kiyoaki Hanai	7
(Japan) Team Signal	Nissan Silvia	Nissan SR20DET 2.0 L Turbo I4		85	(Japan) Akio Tomita	7
(United Kingdom) Millennium Motorsport	Marcos LM600	Chevrolet 5.9 L V8	D	86	(United Kingdom) Nick Car	8
(United Kingdom) Millennium Motorsport	Marcos LM600	Chevrolet 5.9 L V8	D	86	(United Kingdom) Ian Astley	8
(United Kingdom) Millennium Motorsport	Marcos LM600	Chevrolet 5.9 L V8	D	86	(United Kingdom) Andy Purvis	8
(Canada) Prova Motorsport	Porsche 911 GT2	Porsche 3.6 L Turbo Flat-6		88	(Canada) Scott Maxwell	10
(Canada) Prova Motorsport	Porsche 911 GT2	Porsche 3.6 L Turbo Flat-6		88	(United States) Scott Peeler	10
(United States) Saleen-Allen Speedlab	Saleen Mustang SR	Ford 5.9 L V8		95	(United States) Steve Saleen	11
(United States) Saleen-Allen Speedlab	Saleen Mustang SR	Ford 5.9 L V8		95	(Spain) Carlos Palau	11
(United States) GMB Motorsport	Porsche 911 GT2	Porsche 3.6 L Turbo Flat-6		97	(United States) Dirk Layer	11
(United States) GMB Motorsport	Porsche 911 GT2	Porsche 3.6 L Turbo Flat-6		97	(United States) Cort Wagner	11
(United States) GMB Motorsport	Porsche 911 GT2	Porsche 3.6 L Turbo Flat-6		97	(United States) Kelly Collins	11

== Results and standings ==
=== Race results ===
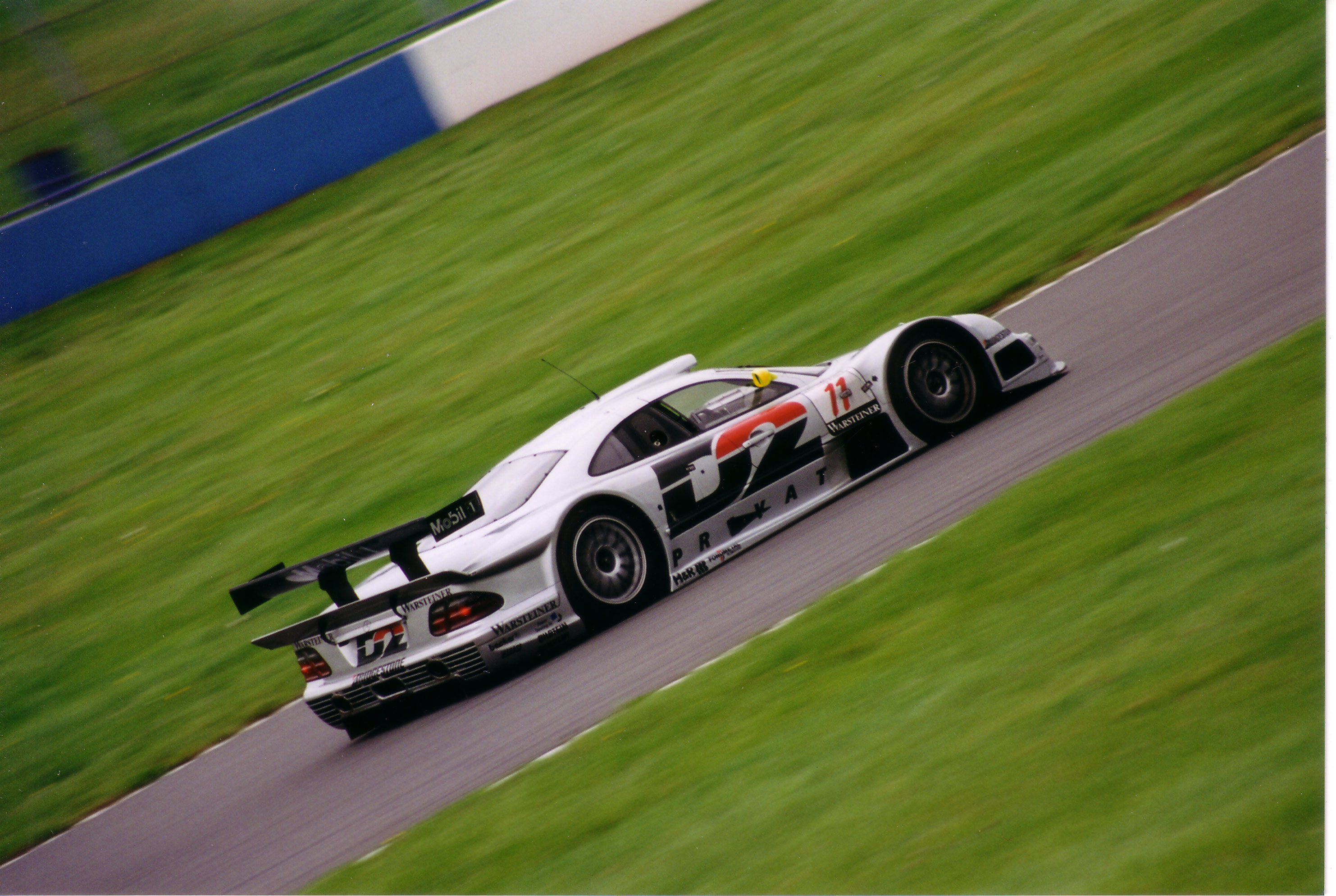
The No. 11 Mercedes-Benz CLK GTR of Bernd Schneider and Alexander Wurz en route to victory at Donington Park

Rnd	Circuit	GT1 Winning Team	GT2 Winning Team	Report
Rnd	Circuit	GT1 Winning Drivers	GT2 Winning Drivers	Report
1	Hockenheimring	(Germany) No. 8 Team BMW Motorsport	(France) No. 51 Viper Team Oreca	Report
1	Hockenheimring	(Finland) JJ Lehto (United Kingdom) Steve Soper	(Monaco) Olivier Beretta (France) Philippe Gache	Report
2	Silverstone	(Germany) No. 9 Team BMW Motorsport	(France) No. 52 Viper Team Oreca	Report
2	Silverstone	(Netherlands) Peter Kox (Italy) Roberto Ravaglia	(United Kingdom) Justin Bell (United States) Tommy Archer	Report
3	Helsinki	(Germany) No. 8 Team BMW Motorsport	(Germany) No. 56 Roock Racing	Report
3	Helsinki	(Finland) JJ Lehto (United Kingdom) Steve Soper	(Germany) Claudia Hürtgen (Switzerland) Bruno Eichmann (Portugal) Ni Amorim	Report
4	Nürburgring	(Germany) No. 11 AMG-Mercedes	(Germany) No. 56 Roock Racing	Report
4	Nürburgring	(Germany) Bernd Schneider (Germany) Klaus Ludwig	(Germany) Claudia Hürtgen (Switzerland) Bruno Eichmann (Portugal) Ni Amorim	Report
5	Spa	(Germany) No. 8 BMW Motorsport	(France) No. 52 Viper Team Oreca	Report
5	Spa	(Finland) JJ Lehto (United Kingdom) Steve Soper	(United Kingdom) Justin Bell (Belgium) Marc Duez	Report
6	A1-Ring	(Germany) No. 12 AMG-Mercedes	(Germany) No. 57 Roock Racing	Report
6	A1-Ring	(Germany) Klaus Ludwig (Germany) Bernd Mayländer (Germany) Bernd Schneider	(Monaco) Stéphane Ortelli (Germany) Claudia Hürtgen (Switzerland) Bruno Eichmann	Report
7	Suzuka	(Germany) No. 10 AMG-Mercedes	(France) No. 51 Viper Team Oreca	Report
7	Suzuka	(Italy) Alessandro Nannini (Germany) Marcel Tiemann (Germany) Bernd Schneider	(Monaco) Olivier Beretta (France) Philippe Gache	Report
8	Donington	(Germany) No. 11 AMG-Mercedes	(France) No. 51 Viper Team Oreca	Report
8	Donington	(Germany) Bernd Schneider (Austria) Alexander Wurz	(Monaco) Olivier Beretta (France) Philippe Gache	Report
9	Mugello	(Germany) No. 8 Team BMW Motorsport	(France) No. 52 Viper Team Oreca	Report
9	Mugello	(Finland) JJ Lehto (United Kingdom) Steve Soper	(United Kingdom) Justin Bell (Italy) Luca Drudi	Report
10	Sebring	(Germany) No. 11 AMG-Mercedes	(France) No. 51 Viper Team Oreca	Report
10	Sebring	(Germany) Bernd Schneider (Germany) Klaus Ludwig	(Monaco) Olivier Beretta (France) Philippe Gache	Report
11	Laguna Seca	(Germany) No. 11 AMG-Mercedes	(Germany) No. 56 Roock Racing	Report
11	Laguna Seca	(Germany) Bernd Schneider (Germany) Klaus Ludwig	(Monaco) Stéphane Ortelli (Switzerland) Bruno Eichmann	Report

Points were awarded to the top six finishers in each category. Entries were required to complete 75% of the race distance in order to be classified.

Points system
1st	2nd	3rd	4th	5th	6th
10	6	4	3	2	1

=== Driver championships ===
==== GT1 ====
Pos.	Driver	Team	HOC (Germany)	SIL (United Kingdom)	HEL (Finland)	NUR (Germany)	SPA (Belgium)	ZEL (Austria)	SUZ (Japan)	DON (United Kingdom)	MUG (Italy)	SEB (United States)	LAG (United States)	Total points
1	(Germany) Bernd Schneider	(Germany) AMG-Mercedes	Ret	2	8	1	2	1	1	1	Ret	1	1	72
2	(United Kingdom) Steve Soper	(Germany) Team BMW Motorsport	1	3	1	3	1	3	4	3	1	14	11	59
3	(Finland) JJ Lehto	(Germany) Team BMW Motorsport	1	3	1	3	1	3	4	3	1	14	Ret	59
4	(Germany) Klaus Ludwig	(Germany) Kremer Racing	8											51
4	(Germany) Klaus Ludwig	(Germany) AMG-Mercedes			11	1	5	1	2	4	9	1	1	51
5	(Italy) Alessandro Nannini	(Germany) AMG-Mercedes	13	13	11	2	11	2	1	2	2	Ret	8	34
6	(Germany) Marcel Tiemann	(Germany) AMG-Mercedes	13	13		2	11	2	1	2	2	Ret	8	34
7	(France) Pierre-Henri Raphanel	(United Kingdom) Gulf Team Davidoff	2	4	4	5	Ret	5	3	6	6	5	4	27
8	(Italy) Roberto Ravaglia	(Germany) Team BMW Motorsport	Ret	1	10	4	4	Ret	8	5	5	2	11	26
9	(Netherlands) Peter Kox	(Germany) Team BMW Motorsport	Ret	1	10	4	4	Ret	8	5	5	2	Ret	26
10	(Austria) Alexander Wurz	(Germany) AMG-Mercedes	Ret	2	8		2	4	7	1	Ret	7	7	25
11	(France) Jean-Marc Gounon	(United Kingdom) Gulf Team Davidoff	2	DNS	4	5	Ret		3	6	6	5	4	22
12	(France) Bob Wollek	(Germany) Schübel Rennsport	6	7										21
12	(France) Bob Wollek	(Germany) Porsche AG				17	3	6	5	15	3	4	2	21
13	(Germany) Bernd Mayländer	(Germany) AMG-Mercedes				Ret		1	2	4	9			19
14	(France) Yannick Dalmas	(Germany) Roock Racing	5	Ret										19
14	(France) Yannick Dalmas	(Germany) Porsche AG				17	3	7	10	15	3	4	2	19
15	(Belgium) Thierry Boutsen	(Germany) Porsche AG	4	5		10	3	6	5	11	4	6	5	18
16	(Germany) Ralf Kelleners	(Germany) Roock Racing	5	Ret	2	Ret	7	13	13					15
16	(Germany) Ralf Kelleners	(Germany) Porsche AG									4		3	15
17	(Germany) Hans-Joachim Stuck	(Germany) Porsche AG	4	5		10	Ret		5	11		6	5	10
18	(Denmark) John Nielsen	(United Kingdom) Gulf Team Davidoff	3	8	3	7	Ret	Ret	6		14	12	10	9
19	(Germany) Thomas Bscher	(United Kingdom) Gulf Team Davidoff	3	8	3	7	Ret	Ret	DNS		14	12	10	8
20	(Sweden) Anders Olofsson	(United Kingdom) Gulf Team Davidoff				Ret	Ret	5	3	7	8	10	6	7
21	(United Kingdom) Andrew Gilbert-Scott	(United Kingdom) Gulf Team Davidoff	Ret	4	4	Ret	Ret	Ret	6					7
22	(Monaco) Stéphane Ortelli	(Germany) Roock Racing			2	Ret	7							6
23	(United Kingdom) Allan McNish	(Germany) Porsche AG						7	10				3	4
24	(Australia) David Brabham	(United Kingdom) David Price Racing	DNS	10		13	DNS	11	12	8	10	3	DSQ	4
24	(United Kingdom) Perry McCarthy	(United Kingdom) David Price Racing	DNS	10		13	DNS	11	12	8	10	3	DSQ	4
25	(United Kingdom) Ray Bellm	(United Kingdom) Gulf Team Davidoff	Ret	4										3
26	(United Kingdom) Gary Ayles	(United Kingdom) Parabolica Motorsport		6		6	6	Ret	Ret	13	13		Ret	3
26	(United Kingdom) Chris Goodwin	(United Kingdom) Parabolica Motorsport		6		6	6	Ret	Ret	13	13		Ret	3
27	(Italy) Andrea Boldrini	(United Kingdom) GBF UK Ltd.		14	5	15		Ret						2
28	(Italy) Mauro Martini	(United Kingdom) GBF UK Ltd.	Ret	14	5									2
29	(Germany) Ralf Schumacher	(Germany) AMG-Mercedes					5							2
30	(United Kingdom) Geoff Lees	(United Kingdom) Gulf Team Davidoff						Ret	6	7	8	10	6	2
32	(Italy) Christian Pescatori	(Italy) BMS Scuderia Italia	7	Ret	6	12	10	8		10	Ret			1
32	(Italy) Pierluigi Martini	(Italy) BMS Scuderia Italia	7	Ret	6	12	10	8		10	Ret			1
31	(Portugal) Pedro Lamy	(Germany) Schübel Rennsport	6	7										1
31	(Portugal) Pedro Lamy	(Germany) Porsche AG							10					1
Pos.	Driver	Team	HOC (Germany)	SIL (United Kingdom)	HEL (Finland)	NUR (Germany)	SPA (Belgium)	ZEL (Austria)	SUZ (Japan)	DON (United Kingdom)	MUG (Italy)	SEB (United States)	LAG (United States)	Total points

Colour	Result
Gold	Winner
Silver	Second place
Bronze	Third place
Green	Points classification
Blue	Non-points classification
Blue	Non-classified finish (NC)
Purple	Retired, not classified (Ret)
Red	Did not qualify (DNQ)
Red	Did not pre-qualify (DNPQ)
Black	Disqualified (DSQ)
White	Did not start (DNS)
White	Withdrew (WD)
White	Race cancelled (C)
Blank	Did not practice (DNP)
Blank	Did not arrive (DNA)
Blank	Excluded (EX)

==== GT2 ====
Pos.	Driver	Team	HOC (Germany)	SIL (United Kingdom)	HEL (Finland)	NUR (Germany)	SPA (Belgium)	ZEL (Austria)	SUZ (Japan)	DON (United Kingdom)	MUG (Italy)	SEB (United States)	LAG (United States)	Total points
1	(United Kingdom) Justin Bell	(France) Viper Team Oreca	2	1		2	1	3	3	3	1	2	2	66
2	(Switzerland) Bruno Eichmann	(Germany) Roock Racing	3	2	1	1	6	1	5	2	2	Ret	1	65
3	(France) Philippe Gache	(France) Viper Team Oreca	1	3		17	2	2	1	1	Ret	1	3	60
3	(Monaco) Olivier Beretta	(France) Viper Team Oreca	1	3		17	2	2	1	1	Ret	1	3	60
4	(Germany) Claudia Hürtgen	(Germany) Roock Racing	3	2	1	1	6	1	5	2	2	Ret	Ret	55
5	(Portugal) Ni Amorim	(Germany) Roock Racing	3	2	1	1	6	Ret	5	4	3	3		44
6	(Monaco) Stéphane Ortelli	(Germany) Roock Racing	13	8		10	8	1		2	2		1	32
7	(United States) Tommy Archer	(France) Viper Team Oreca	2	1					3			2	2	32
8	(Belgium) Marc Duez	(France) Viper Team Oreca				2	1							16
9	(Italy) Luca Drudi	(Switzerland) GT Racing Team	DNS			13	10	DNS						14
9	(Italy) Luca Drudi	(United Kingdom) Agusta Racing Team							Ret					14
9	(Italy) Luca Drudi	(France) Viper Team Oreca								3	1			14
10	(Netherlands) Cor Euser	(Netherlands) Marcos Racing International	Ret	Ret	2	Ret	3	8	10	Ret	Ret	4	Ret	13
10	(Germany) Harald Becker	(Netherlands) Marcos Racing International	Ret	Ret	2	Ret	3	8	10	Ret	Ret	4	Ret	13
11	(Portugal) Pedro Chaves	(Germany) Roock Racing							2	4	3	Ret		13
12	(Germany) Bernhard Müller	(Germany) Krauss Motorsport	6	15	3	4	15	4		7	Ret	8	5	13
12	(Germany) Michael Trunk	(Germany) Krauss Motorsport	6	15	3	4	15	4		7	Ret	8	5	13
13	(Switzerland) Toni Seiler	(Germany) Konrad Motorsport	5	9	Ret	3	7	Ret		5	4	6	Ret	12
14	(Austria) Franz Konrad	(Germany) Konrad Motorsport	NC			3	7	Ret	4	5		6	Ret	10
15	(Germany) Wolfgang Kaufmann	(Germany) Konrad Motorsport							4					7
15	(Germany) Wolfgang Kaufmann	(Austria) Karl Augustin									5	5	Ret	7
16	(United Kingdom) Richard Nearn	(Germany) Konrad Motorsport		9										6
16	(United Kingdom) Richard Nearn	(Germany) Roock Racing							2	DNS				6
17	(Japan) Hisashi Wada	(Germany) Roock Racing							2					6
18	(France) Patrice Goueslard	(France) Larbre Compétition							6					6
18	(France) Patrice Goueslard	(United Kingdom) Agusta Racing Team								6				6
18	(France) Patrice Goueslard	(Germany) Roock Racing									3			6
19	(Germany) Wido Rössler	(Austria) Karl Augustin	Ret		5	Ret	Ret	5	7			5	Ret	6
19	(Germany) Wido Rössler	(United Kingdom) Chamberlain Engineering								Ret				6
20	(Italy) Marco Spinelli	(Germany) Konrad Motorsport	5	9	Ret		Ret				4			5
21	(Germany) Uwe Alzen	(Germany) Konrad Motorsport	NC											4
21	(Germany) Uwe Alzen	(Germany) Roock Racing										3	Ret	4
22	(Netherlands) Bert Ploeg	(Netherlands) Marcos Racing International	Ret											4
22	(Netherlands) Bert Ploeg	(Germany) Konrad Motorsport				3								4
23	(Austria) Dieter Quester	(France) Viper Team Oreca						3						4
23	(Japan) Hideshi Matsuda	(France) Viper Team Oreca							3					4
24	(Italy) Angelo Zadra	(Italy) Angelo Zadra	4	6		7	Ret				8			4
24	(Italy) Angelo Zadra	(Netherlands) Marcos Racing International										9		4
25	(Italy) Leonardo Maddalena	(Italy) Angelo Zadra	4	6		7	Ret							4
25	(Italy) Leonardo Maddalena	(United Kingdom) Chamberlain Engineering						Ret		12	10			4
26	(Spain) Alfonso de Orléans-Borbón	(Germany) Kremer Racing	8	4				6		8	Ret			4
26	(Spain) Tomás Saldaña	(Germany) Kremer Racing	8	4				6		8	Ret			4
27	(Germany) Helmut Reis	(Austria) Karl Augustin	Ret	14	5	Ret	Ret	5	7					4
28	(Austria) Manfred Jurasz	(Germany) Dellenbach Motorsport	14	Ret										4
28	(Austria) Manfred Jurasz	(Austria) Karl Augustin			5	Ret	Ret	5						4
28	(Austria) Manfred Jurasz	(Germany) Proton Competition							Ret	10	Ret	DNS	12	4
29	(Finland) Jari Nurminen	(United Kingdom) Chamberlain Engineering	15	10	4									3
30	(United Kingdom) Richard Dean	(United Kingdom) Chamberlain Engineering		11									4	3
30	(United Kingdom) Richard Dean	(United Kingdom) Cirtek								Ret				3
31	(Republic of Ireland) Tim O'Kennedy	(United Kingdom) Chamberlain Engineering				15	12			Ret		DNS	4	3
32	(United Kingdom) Geoff Lister	(United Kingdom) G-Force Strandell		16		16	4							3
32	(United Kingdom) John Greasley	(United Kingdom) G-Force Strandell		16		16	4							3
33	(Sweden) Magnus Wallinder	(United Kingdom) G-Force Strandell				16	4							3
34	(Italy) Marco Brand	(Italy) Angelo Zadra	4											3
34	(Sweden) Carl Rosenblad	(Germany) Kremer Racing		4										3
34	(Finland) Pertti Liovenen	(United Kingdom) Chamberlain Engineering			4									3
34	(Japan) Seiichi Sodeyama	(Germany) Konrad Motorsport							4					3
35	(Belgium) Michel Neugarten	(United Kingdom) Agusta Racing Team					5			6				3
35	(Belgium) Michel Neugarten	(Switzerland) Elf Haberthur Racing										14	10	3
Pos.	Driver	Team	HOC (Germany)	SIL (United Kingdom)	HEL (Finland)	NUR (Germany)	SPA (Belgium)	ZEL (Austria)	SUZ (Japan)	DON (United Kingdom)	MUG (Italy)	SEB (United States)	LAG (United States)	

=== Team championships ===
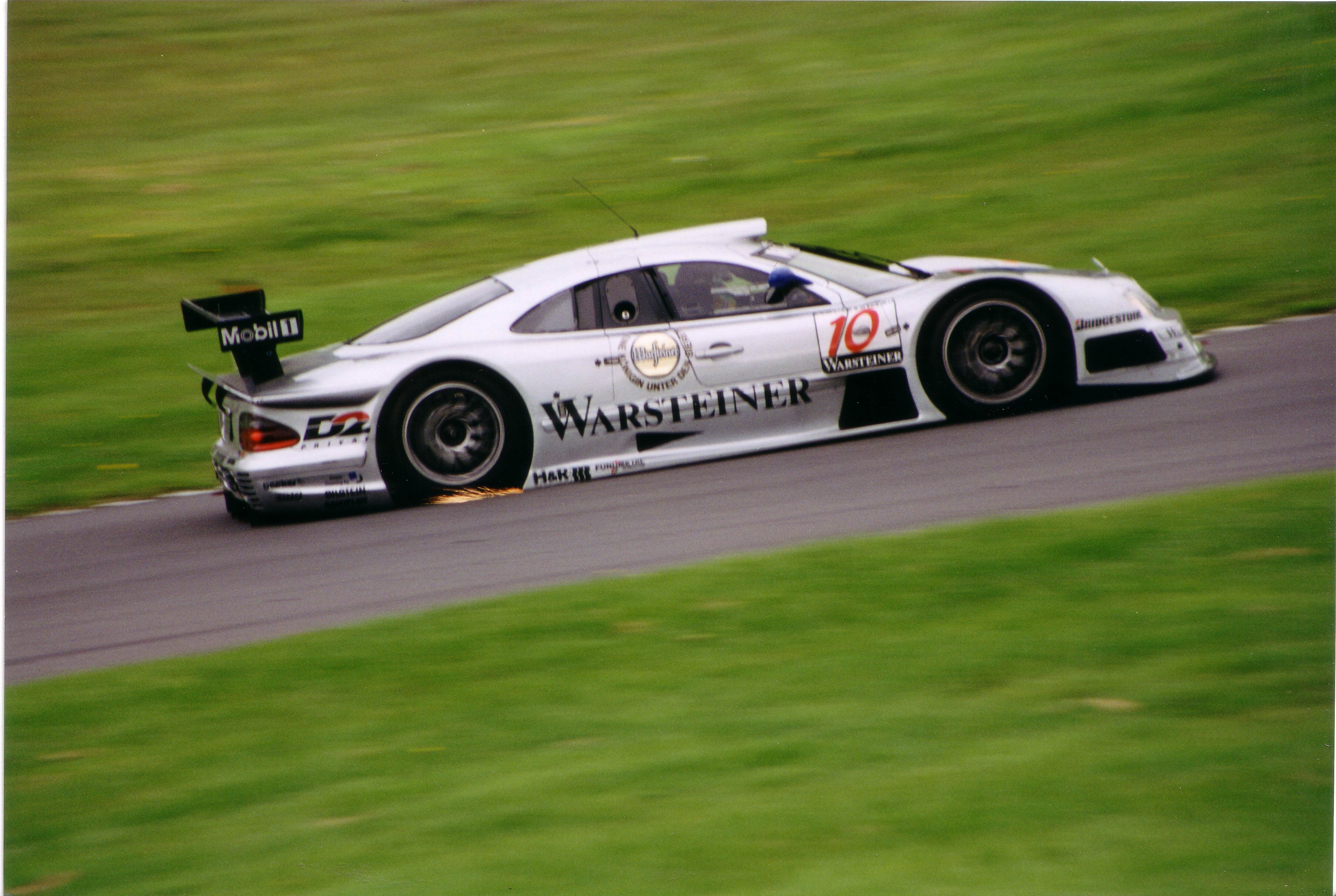
AMG-Mercedes won the GT1 Teams Championship

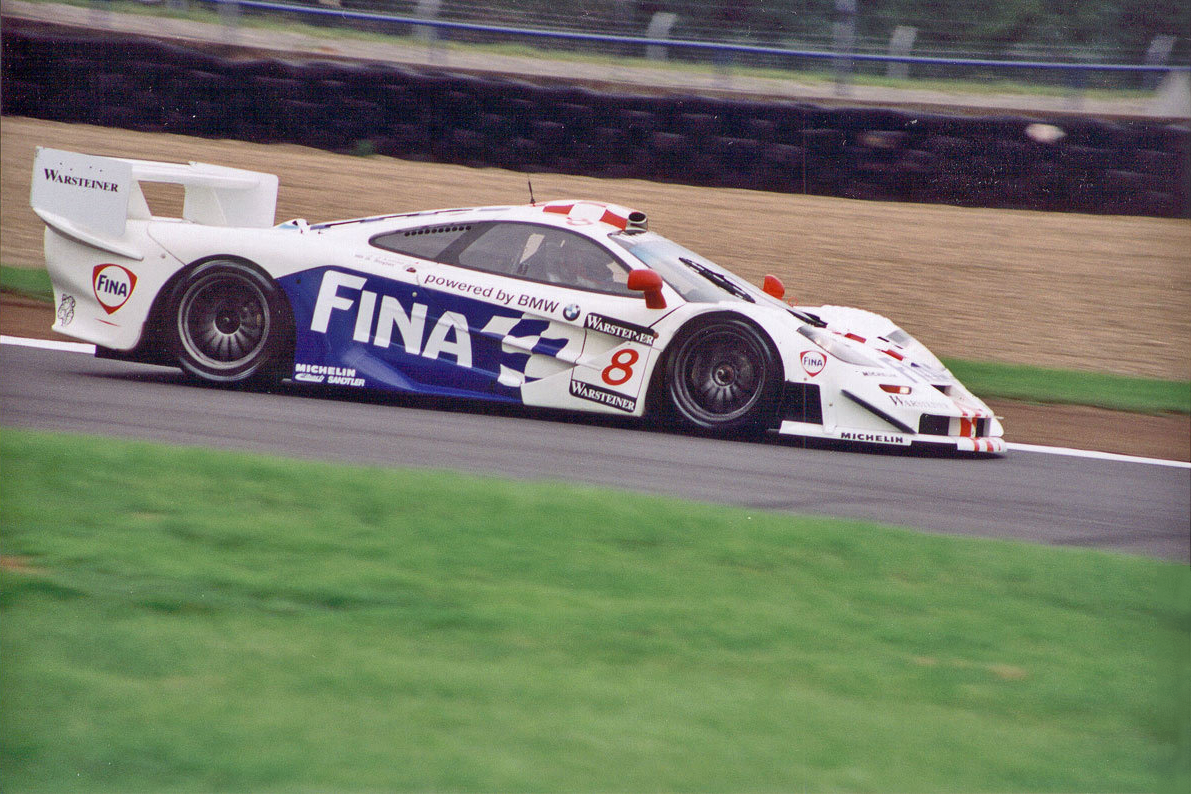
Team BMW Motorsport placed second in the GT1 Teams Championship

Teams score points for all cars that finish each round of the championship. Cars must complete at least 75% of the race distance to be classified.

==== GT1 ====
Pos.	Team	HOC (Germany)	SIL (United Kingdom)	HEL (Finland)	NUR (Germany)	SPA (Belgium)	ZEL (Austria)	SUZ (Japan)	DON (United Kingdom)	MUG (Italy)	SEB (United States)	LAG (United States)	Total points
1	(Germany) AMG-Mercedes	13	2	8	1	2	1	1	1	2	1	1	110
1	(Germany) AMG-Mercedes	Ret	13	11	2	5	2	2	2	9	7	7	110
1	(Germany) AMG-Mercedes				Ret	11	4	7	4	Ret	Ret	8	110
2	(Germany) Team BMW Motorsport	1	1	1	3	1	3	4	3	1	2	11	85
2	(Germany) Team BMW Motorsport	Ret	3	10	4	4	Ret	8	5	5	14	Ret	85
3	(United Kingdom) Gulf Team Davidoff	2	4	3	5	Ret	5	3	6	6	5	4	37
3	(United Kingdom) Gulf Team Davidoff	3	8	4	7	Ret	Ret	6	7	8	10	6	37
3	(United Kingdom) Gulf Team Davidoff	Ret	DNS		Ret	Ret	Ret	DNS		14	12	10	37
4	(Germany) Porsche AG	4	5		10	3	6	5	11	3	4	2	35
4	(Germany) Porsche AG				17	Ret	7	10	15	4	6	3	35
4	(Germany) Porsche AG											5	35
5	(Germany) Roock Racing	5	10	2	Ret	7	13	13					8
6	(United Kingdom) David Price Racing	10	Ret		14	9	12	Ret	9	Ret	13	DSQ	4
6	(United Kingdom) David Price Racing	DNS	10		13	DNS	11	12	8	10	3	DSQ	4
7	(United Kingdom) Parabolica Motorsport		6		6	6	Ret	Ret	13	13		Ret	3
8	(United Kingdom) GBF UK Ltd.	Ret	14	5	15		Ret		12	Ret			2
8	(United Kingdom) GBF UK Ltd.		Ret	13	Ret		Ret		Ret	Ret			2
9	(Italy) BMS Scuderia Italia	7	Ret	6	12	10	8		10	Ret			1
10	(Germany) Schübel Rennsport	6	7										1

Colour	Result
Gold	Winner
Silver	Second place
Bronze	Third place
Green	Points classification
Blue	Non-points classification
Blue	Non-classified finish (NC)
Purple	Retired, not classified (Ret)
Red	Did not qualify (DNQ)
Red	Did not pre-qualify (DNPQ)
Black	Disqualified (DSQ)
White	Did not start (DNS)
White	Withdrew (WD)
White	Race cancelled (C)
Blank	Did not practice (DNP)
Blank	Did not arrive (DNA)
Blank	Excluded (EX)

==== GT2 ====
Pos.	Team	HOC (Germany)	SIL (United Kingdom)	HEL (Finland)	NUR (Germany)	SPA (Belgium)	ZEL (Austria)	SUZ (Japan)	DON (United Kingdom)	MUG (Italy)	SEB (United States)	LAG (United States)	Total points
1	(France) Viper Team Oreca	1	1		2	1	2	1	1	1	1	2	126
1	(France) Viper Team Oreca	2	3		15	2	3	3	3	Ret	2	3	126
2	(Germany) Roock Racing	3	2	1	1	6	1	2	2	2	3	1	83
2	(Germany) Roock Racing	13	8	Ret	10	8	Ret	5	4	3	Ret	Ret	83
2	(Germany) Roock Racing								DNS	6	Ret	Ret	83
3	(Germany) Konrad Motorsport	5	9	Ret	3	7	Ret	4	5	4	6	Ret	15
3	(Germany) Konrad Motorsport	NC				Ret					Ret		15
4	(Netherlands) Marcos Racing International	Ret	13	2	Ret	3	8	10	11	Ret	4	12	13
4	(Netherlands) Marcos Racing International	Ret	Ret	7					Ret	DNS	9	Ret	13
5	(Germany) Krauss Motorsport	6	15	3	4	15	4	11	7	Ret	8	5	13
6	(Austria) Karl Augustin	Ret	14	5	Ret	Ret	5	7		5	5	Ret	8
7	(United Kingdom) Chamberlain Engineering	15	10	4	15	12	Ret	12	12	10	10	4	6
7	(United Kingdom) Chamberlain Engineering		11						Ret		DNS	8	6
8	(Italy) Angelo Zadra	4	6		7	Ret				8			4
9	(Germany) Kremer Racing	8	4				6		8	Ret			4
11	(United Kingdom) G-Force Strandell		16		16	4			Ret				3
12	(United Kingdom) Agusta Racing Team	Ret	18		14	5		Ret	6				3
13	(Switzerland) Stadler Motorsport	12	12		5	16		8		11	7	Ret	2
13	(Switzerland) Stadler Motorsport	Ret			9						12	Ret	2
14	(Germany) RWS	Ret	5		Ret	9	Ret			9			2
15	(Germany) Dellenbach Motorsport	14	Ret		Ret	11	7		9	7	Ret	6	1
16	(Germany) Proton Competition	10	DNS	6	11	17	9	Ret	10	Ret	DNS	Ret	1
17	(Germany) Seikel Motorsport	9			6					12			1
18	(France) Larbre Compétition							6					1

== Bibliography ==
- Cole, Michael; Hurel, Jean-Marc; Tons, Jakob (1999). GT International: The Cars 1993–1998. London: Sutton Publishing. pp. 90–125. ISBN 978-0750920407.
