= 1997 FIA GT Sebring 3 Hours =

The 1997 FIA GT Sebring 3 Hours was the tenth race of the 1997 FIA GT Championship season. It was run at Sebring International Raceway, United States on October 18, 1997.

== Official results ==
Class winners in bold. Cars failing to complete 75% of winner's distance marked as Not Classified (NC).

| Pos | Class | No | Team | Drivers | Chassis | Tyre | Laps |
| Pos | Class | No | Team | Drivers | Engine | Tyre | Laps |
|---|---|---|---|---|---|---|---|
| 1 | **GT1** | **11** | **(Germany) AMG-Mercedes** | **(Germany) Bernd Schneider (Germany) Klaus Ludwig** | **Mercedes-Benz CLK GTR** | **B** | **70** |
| 1 | **GT1** | **11** | **(Germany) AMG-Mercedes** | **(Germany) Bernd Schneider (Germany) Klaus Ludwig** | **Mercedes-Benz LS600 6.0L V12** | **B** | **70** |
| 2 | GT1 | 9 | (Germany) BMW Motorsport (Germany) Schnitzer Motorsport | (Netherlands) Peter Kox (Italy) Roberto Ravaglia | McLaren F1 GTR | **MI** | 70 |
| 2 | GT1 | 9 | (Germany) BMW Motorsport (Germany) Schnitzer Motorsport | (Netherlands) Peter Kox (Italy) Roberto Ravaglia | BMW S70 6.0L V12 | **MI** | 70 |
| 3 | GT1 | 5 | (United Kingdom) David Price Racing | (Australia) David Brabham (United Kingdom) Perry McCarthy | Panoz Esperante GTR-1 | **G** | 69 |
| 3 | GT1 | 5 | (United Kingdom) David Price Racing | (Australia) David Brabham (United Kingdom) Perry McCarthy | Ford (Roush) 6.0L V8 | **G** | 69 |
| 4 | GT1 | 7 | (Germany) Porsche AG | (France) Bob Wollek (France) Yannick Dalmas | Porsche 911 GT1 Evo | **MI** | 69 |
| 4 | GT1 | 7 | (Germany) Porsche AG | (France) Bob Wollek (France) Yannick Dalmas | Porsche 3.2L Turbo Flat-6 | **MI** | 69 |
| 5 | GT1 | 3 | (United Kingdom) Gulf Team Davidoff (United Kingdom) GTC Racing | (France) Pierre-Henri Raphanel (France) Jean-Marc Gounon | McLaren F1 GTR | **MI** | 68 |
| 5 | GT1 | 3 | (United Kingdom) Gulf Team Davidoff (United Kingdom) GTC Racing | (France) Pierre-Henri Raphanel (France) Jean-Marc Gounon | BMW S70 6.0L V12 | **MI** | 68 |
| 6 | GT1 | 6 | (Germany) Porsche AG | (Belgium) Thierry Boutsen (Germany) Hans Joachim Stuck | Porsche 911 GT1 Evo | **MI** | 68 |
| 6 | GT1 | 6 | (Germany) Porsche AG | (Belgium) Thierry Boutsen (Germany) Hans Joachim Stuck | Porsche 3.2L Turbo Flat-6 | **MI** | 68 |
| 7 | GT1 | 12 | (Germany) AMG-Mercedes | (Austria) Alexander Wurz (Canada) Greg Moore | Mercedes-Benz CLK GTR | **B** | 68 |
| 7 | GT1 | 12 | (Germany) AMG-Mercedes | (Austria) Alexander Wurz (Canada) Greg Moore | Mercedes-Benz LS600 6.0L V12 | **B** | 68 |
| 8 | GT1 | 20 | (France) DAMS Panoz | (France) Éric Bernard (France) Franck Lagorce | Panoz Esperante GTR-1 | **MI** | 67 |
| 8 | GT1 | 20 | (France) DAMS Panoz | (France) Éric Bernard (France) Franck Lagorce | Ford (Roush) 6.0L V8 | **MI** | 67 |
| 9 | GT1 | 17 | (France) JB Racing | (France) Emmanuel Collard (Italy) Mauro Baldi | Porsche 911 GT1 Evo | **MI** | 67 |
| 9 | GT1 | 17 | (France) JB Racing | (France) Emmanuel Collard (Italy) Mauro Baldi | Porsche 3.2L Turbo Flat-6 | **MI** | 67 |
| 10 | GT1 | 1 | (United Kingdom) Gulf Team Davidoff (United Kingdom) GTC Racing | (United Kingdom) Geoff Lees (Sweden) Anders Olofsson | McLaren F1 GTR | **MI** | 67 |
| 10 | GT1 | 1 | (United Kingdom) Gulf Team Davidoff (United Kingdom) GTC Racing | (United Kingdom) Geoff Lees (Sweden) Anders Olofsson | BMW S70 6.0L V12 | **MI** | 67 |
| 11 | **GT2** | **51** | **(France) Viper Team Oreca** | **(Monaco) Olivier Beretta (France) Philippe Gache** | **Chrysler Viper GTS-R** | **MI** | **67** |
| 11 | **GT2** | **51** | **(France) Viper Team Oreca** | **(Monaco) Olivier Beretta (France) Philippe Gache** | **Chrysler 8.0L V10** | **MI** | **67** |
| 12 | GT2 | 52 | (France) Viper Team Oreca | (United Kingdom) Justin Bell (United States) Tommy Archer | Chrysler Viper GTS-R | **MI** | 67 |
| 12 | GT2 | 52 | (France) Viper Team Oreca | (United Kingdom) Justin Bell (United States) Tommy Archer | Chrysler 8.0L V10 | **MI** | 67 |
| 13 | GT1 | 14 | (United Kingdom) GT1 Lotus Racing | (Netherlands) Jan Lammers (Netherlands) Mike Hezemans (Italy) Max Angelelli | Lotus Elise GT1 | **MI** | 66 |
| 13 | GT1 | 14 | (United Kingdom) GT1 Lotus Racing | (Netherlands) Jan Lammers (Netherlands) Mike Hezemans (Italy) Max Angelelli | Chevrolet LT5 6.0L V8 | **MI** | 66 |
| 14 | GT2 | 57 | (Germany) Roock Racing | (Germany) Uwe Alzen (Portugal) Ni Amorim | Porsche 911 GT2 | **MI** | 66 |
| 14 | GT2 | 57 | (Germany) Roock Racing | (Germany) Uwe Alzen (Portugal) Ni Amorim | Porsche 3.6L Turbo Flat-6 | **MI** | 66 |
| 15 | GT2 | 59 | (Netherlands) Marcos Racing International | (Netherlands) Cor Euser (Germany) Harald Becker | Marcos LM600 | **D** | 65 |
| 15 | GT2 | 59 | (Netherlands) Marcos Racing International | (Netherlands) Cor Euser (Germany) Harald Becker | Chevrolet 5.9L V8 | **D** | 65 |
| 16 | GT1 | 2 | (United Kingdom) Gulf Team Davidoff (United Kingdom) GTC Racing | (Denmark) John Nielsen (Germany) Thomas Bscher | McLaren F1 GTR | **MI** | 65 |
| 16 | GT1 | 2 | (United Kingdom) Gulf Team Davidoff (United Kingdom) GTC Racing | (Denmark) John Nielsen (Germany) Thomas Bscher | BMW S70 6.0L V12 | **MI** | 65 |
| 17 | GT2 | 55 | (Austria) Augustin Motorsport | (Germany) Wido Rössler (Germany) Wolfgang Kaufmann | Porsche 911 GT2 | **G** | 64 |
| 17 | GT2 | 55 | (Austria) Augustin Motorsport | (Germany) Wido Rössler (Germany) Wolfgang Kaufmann | Porsche 3.6L Turbo Flat-6 | **G** | 64 |
| 18 | GT1 | 4 | (United Kingdom) David Price Racing | (United Kingdom) Andy Wallace (France) Olivier Grouillard | Panoz Esperante GTR-1 | **G** | 64 |
| 18 | GT1 | 4 | (United Kingdom) David Price Racing | (United Kingdom) Andy Wallace (France) Olivier Grouillard | Ford (Roush) 6.0L V8 | **G** | 64 |
| 19 | GT2 | 66 | (Germany) Konrad Motorsport | (Austria) Franz Konrad (Switzerland) Toni Seiler | Porsche 911 GT2 | **P** | 64 |
| 19 | GT2 | 66 | (Germany) Konrad Motorsport | (Austria) Franz Konrad (Switzerland) Toni Seiler | Porsche 3.6L Turbo Flat-6 | **P** | 64 |
| 20 | GT2 | 61 | (Switzerland) Stadler Motorsport | (Switzerland) Enzo Calderari (Switzerland) Lilian Bryner | Porsche 911 GT2 | **P** | 63 |
| 20 | GT2 | 61 | (Switzerland) Stadler Motorsport | (Switzerland) Enzo Calderari (Switzerland) Lilian Bryner | Porsche 3.6L Turbo Flat-6 | **P** | 63 |
| 21 | GT2 | 63 | (Germany) Krauss Motorsport | (Germany) Michael Trunk (Germany) Bernhard Müller | Porsche 911 GT2 | **P** | 62 |
| 21 | GT2 | 63 | (Germany) Krauss Motorsport | (Germany) Michael Trunk (Germany) Bernhard Müller | Porsche 3.6L Turbo Flat-6 | **P** | 62 |
| 22 | GT1 | 8 | (Germany) BMW Motorsport (Germany) Schnitzer Motorsport | (Finland) JJ Lehto (United Kingdom) Steve Soper | McLaren F1 GTR | **MI** | 60 |
| 22 | GT1 | 8 | (Germany) BMW Motorsport (Germany) Schnitzer Motorsport | (Finland) JJ Lehto (United Kingdom) Steve Soper | BMW S70 6.0L V12 | **MI** | 60 |
| 23 | GT2 | 60 | (Netherlands) Marcos Racing International | (Italy) Angelo Zadra (Netherlands) Martijn Koene | Marcos LM600 | **D** | 60 |
| 23 | GT2 | 60 | (Netherlands) Marcos Racing International | (Italy) Angelo Zadra (Netherlands) Martijn Koene | Chevrolet 5.9L V8 | **D** | 60 |
| 24 | GT2 | 53 | (United Kingdom) Chamberlain Engineering | (United States) Chris Gleason (United States) Zak Brown (United States) Rick Fairbanks | Chrysler Viper GTS-R | **G** | 60 |
| 24 | GT2 | 53 | (United Kingdom) Chamberlain Engineering | (United States) Chris Gleason (United States) Zak Brown (United States) Rick Fairbanks | Chrysler 8.0L V10 | **G** | 60 |
| 25 | GT2 | 58 | (France) Estoril Racing Team | (France) Michel Monteiro (Portugal) Manuel Monteiro | Porsche 911 GT2 | ? | 59 |
| 25 | GT2 | 58 | (France) Estoril Racing Team | (France) Michel Monteiro (Portugal) Manuel Monteiro | Porsche 3.6L Turbo Flat-6 | ? | 59 |
| 26 | GT2 | 62 | (Switzerland) Stadler Motorsport | (Switzerland) Uwe Sick (Switzerland) Denis Lay | Porsche 911 GT2 | **P** | 59 |
| 26 | GT2 | 62 | (Switzerland) Stadler Motorsport | (Switzerland) Uwe Sick (Switzerland) Denis Lay | Porsche 3.6L Turbo Flat-6 | **P** | 59 |
| 27 | GT2 | 80 | (United Kingdom) Morgan Motor Company | (United Kingdom) Tony Dron (United Kingdom) William Wykeham | Morgan Plus 8 GTR | **D** | 58 |
| 27 | GT2 | 80 | (United Kingdom) Morgan Motor Company | (United Kingdom) Tony Dron (United Kingdom) William Wykeham | Rover 3.9L V8 | **D** | 58 |
| 28 | GT2 | 72 | (Switzerland) Elf Haberthur Racing | (Belgium) Michel Neugarten (France) Michel Ligonnet (United States) Will Pace | Porsche 911 GT2 | **D** | 57 |
| 28 | GT2 | 72 | (Switzerland) Elf Haberthur Racing | (Belgium) Michel Neugarten (France) Michel Ligonnet (United States) Will Pace | Porsche 3.6L Turbo Flat-6 | **D** | 57 |
| 29 DNF | GT2 | 56 | (Germany) Roock Racing | (Switzerland) Bruno Eichmann (Germany) Claudia Hürtgen | Porsche 911 GT2 | **MI** | 56 |
| 29 DNF | GT2 | 56 | (Germany) Roock Racing | (Switzerland) Bruno Eichmann (Germany) Claudia Hürtgen | Porsche 3.6L Turbo Flat-6 | **MI** | 56 |
| 30 DNF | GT2 | 87 | (Germany) Roock Racing | (Portugal) Pedro Chaves (Germany) André Ahrlé | Porsche 911 GT2 | **MI** | 29 |
| 30 DNF | GT2 | 87 | (Germany) Roock Racing | (Portugal) Pedro Chaves (Germany) André Ahrlé | Porsche 3.6L Turbo Flat-6 | **MI** | 29 |
| 31 DNF | GT2 | 70 | (Germany) Dellenbach Motorsport | (Germany) Klaus Horn (Germany) Ranier Bonnetmsüller | Porsche 911 GT2 | **D** | 20 |
| 31 DNF | GT2 | 70 | (Germany) Dellenbach Motorsport | (Germany) Klaus Horn (Germany) Ranier Bonnetmsüller | Porsche 3.6L Turbo Flat-6 | **D** | 20 |
| 32 DNF | GT1 | 10 | (Germany) AMG-Mercedes | (Germany) Marcel Tiemann (Italy) Alessandro Nannini | Mercedes-Benz CLK GTR | **B** | 17 |
| 32 DNF | GT1 | 10 | (Germany) AMG-Mercedes | (Germany) Marcel Tiemann (Italy) Alessandro Nannini | Mercedes-Benz LS600 6.0L V12 | **B** | 17 |
| 33 DNF | GT1 | 30 | (United Kingdom) G-Force Strandell | (United Kingdom) Geoff Lister (United Kingdom) John Greasley (Sweden) Magnus Wallinder | Porsche 911 GT1 | **D** | 6 |
| 33 DNF | GT1 | 30 | (United Kingdom) G-Force Strandell | (United Kingdom) Geoff Lister (United Kingdom) John Greasley (Sweden) Magnus Wallinder | Porsche 3.2L Turbo Flat-6 | **D** | 6 |
| 34 DNF | GT2 | 67 | (Germany) Konrad Motorsport | (United States) Martin Snow (Czech Republic) Karel Dolejší | Porsche 911 GT2 | **P** | 4 |
| 34 DNF | GT2 | 67 | (Germany) Konrad Motorsport | (United States) Martin Snow (Czech Republic) Karel Dolejší | Porsche 3.6L Turbo Flat-6 | **P** | 4 |
| 35 DNF | GT1 | 13 | (United Kingdom) GT1 Lotus Racing | (France) Fabien Giroix (Switzerland) Jean-Denis Délétraz | Lotus Elise GT1 | **MI** | 4 |
| 35 DNF | GT1 | 13 | (United Kingdom) GT1 Lotus Racing | (France) Fabien Giroix (Switzerland) Jean-Denis Délétraz | Chevrolet LT5 6.0L V8 | **MI** | 4 |
| 36 DNF | GT1 | 29 | (United Kingdom) Newcastle United Lister | (United Kingdom) Julian Bailey (Belgium) Eric van de Poele | Lister Storm GTL | **D** | 2 |
| 36 DNF | GT1 | 29 | (United Kingdom) Newcastle United Lister | (United Kingdom) Julian Bailey (Belgium) Eric van de Poele | Jaguar 7.0L V12 | **D** | 2 |
| DNS | GT2 | 54 | (United Kingdom) Chamberlain Engineering | (Republic of Ireland) Tim O'Kennedy (United States) Matthew Cohen (United States) Pete Halsmer | Chrysler Viper GTS-R | **G** | – |
| DNS | GT2 | 54 | (United Kingdom) Chamberlain Engineering | (Republic of Ireland) Tim O'Kennedy (United States) Matthew Cohen (United States) Pete Halsmer | Chrysler 8.0L V10 | **G** | – |
| DNS | GT2 | 69 | (Germany) Proton Competition | (Germany) Gerold Ried (France) Patrick Vuillaume (Austria) Manfred Jurasz | Porsche 911 GT2 | **P** | – |
| DNS | GT2 | 69 | (Germany) Proton Competition | (Germany) Gerold Ried (France) Patrick Vuillaume (Austria) Manfred Jurasz | Porsche 3.6L Turbo Flat-6 | **P** | – |
| DNS | GT2 | 77 | (United States) Saleen-Allen Speedlab (United Kingdom) Cirtek Motorsport | (United Kingdom) Peter Owen (United Kingdom) Robert Schirle (United Kingdom) Christian Vann | Saleen Mustang RRR | **D** | – |
| DNS | GT2 | 77 | (United States) Saleen-Allen Speedlab (United Kingdom) Cirtek Motorsport | (United Kingdom) Peter Owen (United Kingdom) Robert Schirle (United Kingdom) Christian Vann | Ford 5.9L V8 | **D** | – |
| DNS | GT2 | 88 | (United States) Prova Motorsport | (United States) Scott Peeler (Canada) Scott Maxwell | Porsche 911 GT2 | ? | – |
| DNS | GT2 | 88 | (United States) Prova Motorsport | (United States) Scott Peeler (Canada) Scott Maxwell | Porsche 3.6L Turbo Flat-6 | ? | – |

== Statistics ==
- Pole Position – #8 BMW Motorsport – 1:55.929
- Fastest Lap – #9 BMW Motorsport – 1:59.290
- Distance – 423.354 km
- Average Speed – 140.867 km/h

FIA GT Championship
| Previous race: 1997 FIA GT Mugello 4 Hours | 1997 season | Next race: 1997 FIA GT Laguna Seca 3 Hours |
