= 1997 FIA GT Mugello 4 Hours =

Layout of the Mugello Circuit

The 1997 FIA GT Mugello 4 Hours was the ninth race of the 1997 FIA GT Championship season. It was run at Mugello Circuit, Italy on September 28, 1997.

== Official results ==
Class winners in bold. Cars failing to complete 75% of winner's distance marked as Not Classified (NC).

Pos	Class	No	Team	Drivers	Chassis	Tyre	Laps
Pos	Class	No	Team	Drivers	Engine	Tyre	Laps
1	**GT1**	**8**	**(Germany) BMW Motorsport (Germany) Schnitzer Motorsport**	**(Finland) JJ Lehto (United Kingdom) Steve Soper**	**McLaren F1 GTR**	**MI**	**132**
1	**GT1**	**8**	**(Germany) BMW Motorsport (Germany) Schnitzer Motorsport**	**(Finland) JJ Lehto (United Kingdom) Steve Soper**	**BMW S70 6.0L V12**	**MI**	**132**
2	GT1	10	(Germany) AMG-Mercedes	(Germany) Marcel Tiemann (Italy) Alessandro Nannini	Mercedes-Benz CLK GTR	**B**	132
2	GT1	10	(Germany) AMG-Mercedes	(Germany) Marcel Tiemann (Italy) Alessandro Nannini	Mercedes-Benz LS600 6.0L V12	**B**	132
3	GT1	7	(Germany) Porsche AG	(France) Bob Wollek (France) Yannick Dalmas	Porsche 911 GT1 Evo	**MI**	132
3	GT1	7	(Germany) Porsche AG	(France) Bob Wollek (France) Yannick Dalmas	Porsche 3.2L Turbo Flat-6	**MI**	132
4	GT1	6	(Germany) Porsche AG	(Belgium) Thierry Boutsen (Germany) Ralf Kelleners	Porsche 911 GT1 Evo	**MI**	132
4	GT1	6	(Germany) Porsche AG	(Belgium) Thierry Boutsen (Germany) Ralf Kelleners	Porsche 3.2L Turbo Flat-6	**MI**	132
5	GT1	9	(Germany) BMW Motorsport (Germany) Schnitzer Motorsport	(Netherlands) Peter Kox (Italy) Roberto Ravaglia	McLaren F1 GTR	**MI**	131
5	GT1	9	(Germany) BMW Motorsport (Germany) Schnitzer Motorsport	(Netherlands) Peter Kox (Italy) Roberto Ravaglia	BMW S70 6.0L V12	**MI**	131
6	GT1	3	(United Kingdom) Gulf Team Davidoff (United Kingdom) GTC Racing	(France) Pierre-Henri Raphanel (France) Jean-Marc Gounon	McLaren F1 GTR	**MI**	157
6	GT1	3	(United Kingdom) Gulf Team Davidoff (United Kingdom) GTC Racing	(France) Pierre-Henri Raphanel (France) Jean-Marc Gounon	BMW S70 6.0L V12	**MI**	157
7	GT1	20	(France) DAMS Panoz	(France) Éric Bernard (France) Franck Lagorce	Panoz Esperante GTR-1	**MI**	131
7	GT1	20	(France) DAMS Panoz	(France) Éric Bernard (France) Franck Lagorce	Ford (Roush) 6.0L V8	**MI**	131
8	GT1	1	(United Kingdom) Gulf Team Davidoff (United Kingdom) GTC Racing	(United Kingdom) Geoff Lees (Sweden) Anders Olofsson	McLaren F1 GTR	**MI**	130
8	GT1	1	(United Kingdom) Gulf Team Davidoff (United Kingdom) GTC Racing	(United Kingdom) Geoff Lees (Sweden) Anders Olofsson	BMW S70 6.0L V12	**MI**	130
9	GT1	12	(Germany) AMG-Mercedes	(Germany) Klaus Ludwig (Germany) Bernd Mayländer	Mercedes-Benz CLK GTR	**B**	130
9	GT1	12	(Germany) AMG-Mercedes	(Germany) Klaus Ludwig (Germany) Bernd Mayländer	Mercedes-Benz LS600 6.0L V12	**B**	130
10	GT1	5	(United Kingdom) David Price Racing	(Australia) David Brabham (United Kingdom) Perry McCarthy	Panoz Esperante GTR-1	**G**	129
10	GT1	5	(United Kingdom) David Price Racing	(Australia) David Brabham (United Kingdom) Perry McCarthy	Ford (Roush) 6.0L V8	**G**	129
11	GT1	14	(United Kingdom) GT1 Lotus Racing	(Netherlands) Jan Lammers (Netherlands) Mike Hezemans	Lotus Elise GT1	**MI**	129
11	GT1	14	(United Kingdom) GT1 Lotus Racing	(Netherlands) Jan Lammers (Netherlands) Mike Hezemans	Chevrolet LT5 6.0L V8	**MI**	129
12	GT1	21	(Germany) Kremer Racing	(France) Christophe Bouchut (Sweden) Carl Rosenblad	Porsche 911 GT1	**G**	128
12	GT1	21	(Germany) Kremer Racing	(France) Christophe Bouchut (Sweden) Carl Rosenblad	Porsche 3.2L Turbo Flat-6	**G**	128
13	GT1	27	(United Kingdom) Parabolica Motorsport	(United Kingdom) Gary Ayles (United Kingdom) Chris Goodwin	McLaren F1 GTR	**MI**	127
13	GT1	27	(United Kingdom) Parabolica Motorsport	(United Kingdom) Gary Ayles (United Kingdom) Chris Goodwin	BMW S70 6.0L V12	**MI**	127
14	**GT2**	**52**	**(France) Viper Team Oreca**	**(United Kingdom) Justin Bell (Italy) Luca Drudi**	**Chrysler Viper GTS-R**	**MI**	**122**
14	**GT2**	**52**	**(France) Viper Team Oreca**	**(United Kingdom) Justin Bell (Italy) Luca Drudi**	**Chrysler 8.0L V10**	**MI**	**122**
15	GT2	56	(Germany) Roock Racing	(Switzerland) Bruno Eichmann (France) Stéphane Ortelli (Germany) Claudia Hürtgen	Porsche 911 GT2	**MI**	121
15	GT2	56	(Germany) Roock Racing	(Switzerland) Bruno Eichmann (France) Stéphane Ortelli (Germany) Claudia Hürtgen	Porsche 3.6L Turbo Flat-6	**MI**	121
16	GT2	57	(Germany) Roock Racing	(Portugal) Pedro Chaves (Portugal) Ni Amorim (France) Patrice Goueslard	Porsche 911 GT2	**MI**	121
16	GT2	57	(Germany) Roock Racing	(Portugal) Pedro Chaves (Portugal) Ni Amorim (France) Patrice Goueslard	Porsche 3.6L Turbo Flat-6	**MI**	121
17	GT2	66	(Germany) Konrad Motorsport	(Italy) Marco Spinelli (Switzerland) Toni Seiler	Porsche 911 GT2	**P**	118
17	GT2	66	(Germany) Konrad Motorsport	(Italy) Marco Spinelli (Switzerland) Toni Seiler	Porsche 3.6L Turbo Flat-6	**P**	118
18	GT2	55	(Austria) Augustin Motorsport	(Germany) Ernst Gschwender (Germany) Wolfgang Kaufmann	Porsche 911 GT2	**G**	117
18	GT2	55	(Austria) Augustin Motorsport	(Germany) Ernst Gschwender (Germany) Wolfgang Kaufmann	Porsche 3.6L Turbo Flat-6	**G**	117
19	GT2	87	(Germany) Roock Racing	(United Kingdom) Hugh Price (United Kingdom) John Robinson (Germany) Mike Martin	Porsche 911 GT2	**MI**	117
19	GT2	87	(Germany) Roock Racing	(United Kingdom) Hugh Price (United Kingdom) John Robinson (Germany) Mike Martin	Porsche 3.6L Turbo Flat-6	**MI**	117
20	GT2	70	(Germany) Dellenbach Motorsport	(Germany) Klaus Horn (Germany) Günther Blieninger (Germany) Rainer Bonnetmsüller	Porsche 911 GT2	**D**	116
20	GT2	70	(Germany) Dellenbach Motorsport	(Germany) Klaus Horn (Germany) Günther Blieninger (Germany) Rainer Bonnetmsüller	Porsche 3.6L Turbo Flat-6	**D**	116
21	GT2	68	(Italy) Rennsport Italia	(Italy) Angelo Zadra (Austria) Philipp Peter	Porsche 911 GT2	?	115
21	GT2	68	(Italy) Rennsport Italia	(Italy) Angelo Zadra (Austria) Philipp Peter	Porsche 3.6L Turbo Flat-6	?	115
22	GT2	65	(Germany) RWS	(Italy) Luca Riccitelli (Italy) Raffaele Sangiuolo (Italy) Mario Spagnoli	Porsche 911 GT2	?	115
22	GT2	65	(Germany) RWS	(Italy) Luca Riccitelli (Italy) Raffaele Sangiuolo (Italy) Mario Spagnoli	Porsche 3.6L Turbo Flat-6	?	115
23	GT2	53	(United Kingdom) Chamberlain Engineering	(Italy) Renato Mastropietro (Italy) Leonardo Maddalena (Italy) Piergiuseppe Peroni	Chrysler Viper GTS-R	**G**	115
23	GT2	53	(United Kingdom) Chamberlain Engineering	(Italy) Renato Mastropietro (Italy) Leonardo Maddalena (Italy) Piergiuseppe Peroni	Chrysler 8.0L V10	**G**	115
24	GT2	62	(Switzerland) Stadler Motorsport	(Germany) Axel Röhr (Switzerland) Uwe Sick (Switzerland) Denis Lay	Porsche 911 GT2	**P**	114
24	GT2	62	(Switzerland) Stadler Motorsport	(Germany) Axel Röhr (Switzerland) Uwe Sick (Switzerland) Denis Lay	Porsche 3.6L Turbo Flat-6	**P**	114
25	GT2	73	(Germany) Seikel Motorsport	(Switzerland) Bruno Michelotti (France) Jacques Corbet (New Zealand) Andrew Bagnall	Porsche 911 GT2	?	113
25	GT2	73	(Germany) Seikel Motorsport	(Switzerland) Bruno Michelotti (France) Jacques Corbet (New Zealand) Andrew Bagnall	Porsche 3.6L Turbo Flat-6	?	113
26	GT1	2	(United Kingdom) Gulf Team Davidoff (United Kingdom) GTC Racing	(Denmark) John Nielsen (Germany) Thomas Bscher	McLaren F1 GTR	**MI**	111
26	GT1	2	(United Kingdom) Gulf Team Davidoff (United Kingdom) GTC Racing	(Denmark) John Nielsen (Germany) Thomas Bscher	BMW S70 6.0L V12	**MI**	111
27 DNF	GT1	24	(United Kingdom) GBF UK Ltd.	(Austria) Ralf Kalaschek (Italy) Max Angelelli (Italy) Davide Campana	Lotus Elise GT1	**MI**	105
27 DNF	GT1	24	(United Kingdom) GBF UK Ltd.	(Austria) Ralf Kalaschek (Italy) Max Angelelli (Italy) Davide Campana	Lotus 3.5L Turbo V8	**MI**	105
28 DNF	GT2	51	(France) Viper Team Oreca	(Monaco) Olivier Beretta (France) Philippe Gache	Chrysler Viper GTS-R	**MI**	103
28 DNF	GT2	51	(France) Viper Team Oreca	(Monaco) Olivier Beretta (France) Philippe Gache	Chrysler 8.0L V10	**MI**	103
29 DNF	GT1	17	(France) JB Racing	(France) Emmanuel Collard (Italy) Mauro Baldi	Porsche 911 GT1 Evo	**MI**	98
29 DNF	GT1	17	(France) JB Racing	(France) Emmanuel Collard (Italy) Mauro Baldi	Porsche 3.2L Turbo Flat-6	**MI**	98
30 DNF	GT1	4	(United Kingdom) David Price Racing	(United Kingdom) Andy Wallace (France) Olivier Grouillard	Panoz Esperante GTR-1	**G**	96
30 DNF	GT1	4	(United Kingdom) David Price Racing	(United Kingdom) Andy Wallace (France) Olivier Grouillard	Ford (Roush) 6.0L V8	**G**	96
31 DNF	GT1	23	(United Kingdom) GBF UK Ltd.	(Italy) Luca Badoer (Italy) Mimmo Schiattarella	Lotus Elise GT1	**MI**	82
31 DNF	GT1	23	(United Kingdom) GBF UK Ltd.	(Italy) Luca Badoer (Italy) Mimmo Schiattarella	Lotus 3.5L Turbo V8	**MI**	82
32 DNF	GT1	31	(Austria) Augustin Motorsport	(Austria) Horst Felbermayr Sr. (Austria) Hans-Jörg Hofer (Italy) Stefano Buttiero	Porsche 911 GT2 Evo	**G**	82
32 DNF	GT1	31	(Austria) Augustin Motorsport	(Austria) Horst Felbermayr Sr. (Austria) Hans-Jörg Hofer (Italy) Stefano Buttiero	Porsche 3.6L Turbo Flat-6	**G**	82
33 DNF	GT2	69	(Germany) Proton Competition	(Germany) Gerold Ried (France) Patrick Vuillaume (Austria) Manfred Jurasz	Porsche 911 GT2	**P**	74
33 DNF	GT2	69	(Germany) Proton Competition	(Germany) Gerold Ried (France) Patrick Vuillaume (Austria) Manfred Jurasz	Porsche 3.6L Turbo Flat-6	**P**	74
34 DNF	GT1	11	(Germany) AMG-Mercedes	(Germany) Bernd Schneider (Austria) Alexander Wurz	Mercedes-Benz CLK GTR	**B**	70
34 DNF	GT1	11	(Germany) AMG-Mercedes	(Germany) Bernd Schneider (Austria) Alexander Wurz	Mercedes-Benz LS600 6.0L V12	**B**	70
35 DNF	GT1	22	(Italy) BMS Scuderia Italia	(Italy) Pierluigi Martini (Italy) Christian Pescatori	Porsche 911 GT1	**P**	67
35 DNF	GT1	22	(Italy) BMS Scuderia Italia	(Italy) Pierluigi Martini (Italy) Christian Pescatori	Porsche 3.2L Turbo Flat-6	**P**	67
36 DNF	GT2	63	(Germany) Krauss Rennsport Technik	(Germany) Michael Trunk (Germany) Bernhard Müller	Porsche 911 GT2	**P**	61
36 DNF	GT2	63	(Germany) Krauss Rennsport Technik	(Germany) Michael Trunk (Germany) Bernhard Müller	Porsche 3.6L Turbo Flat-6	**P**	61
37 DNF	GT2	77	(United States) Saleen-Allen Speedlab (United Kingdom) Cirtek Motorsport	(United Kingdom) Peter Owen (United Kingdom) Robert Schirle (United Kingdom) Mark Peters	Saleen Mustang RRR	**D**	45
37 DNF	GT2	77	(United States) Saleen-Allen Speedlab (United Kingdom) Cirtek Motorsport	(United Kingdom) Peter Owen (United Kingdom) Robert Schirle (United Kingdom) Mark Peters	Ford 5.9L V8	**D**	45
38 DNF	GT2	59	(Netherlands) Marcos Racing International	(Netherlands) Cor Euser (Germany) Harald Becker	Marcos LM600	**D**	34
38 DNF	GT2	59	(Netherlands) Marcos Racing International	(Netherlands) Cor Euser (Germany) Harald Becker	Chevrolet 5.9L V8	**D**	34
39 DNF	GT1	19	(Germany) Martin Veyhle Racing (MVR)	(Germany) Alexander Grau (Germany) Marco Werner	Lotus Elise GT1	?	11
39 DNF	GT1	19	(Germany) Martin Veyhle Racing (MVR)	(Germany) Alexander Grau (Germany) Marco Werner	Lotus 3.5L Turbo V8	?	11
40 DNF	GT2	64	(Germany) Kremer Racing	(Spain) Alfonso de Orléans-Bourbon (Spain) Tomas Saldaña	Porsche 911 GT2	**G**	7
40 DNF	GT2	64	(Germany) Kremer Racing	(Spain) Alfonso de Orléans-Bourbon (Spain) Tomas Saldaña	Porsche 3.6L Turbo Flat-6	**G**	7
DNS	GT2	58	(France) Estoril Racing Team	(France) Michel Monteiro (Portugal) Manuel Monteiro	Porsche 911 GT2	?	–
DNS	GT2	58	(France) Estoril Racing Team	(France) Michel Monteiro (Portugal) Manuel Monteiro	Porsche 3.6L Turbo Flat-6	?	–
DNS	GT2	60	(Netherlands) Marcos Racing International	(Italy) Mauro Simoncini (Belgium) Alfons Taels	Marcos LM600	**D**	–
DNS	GT2	60	(Netherlands) Marcos Racing International	(Italy) Mauro Simoncini (Belgium) Alfons Taels	Chevrolet 5.9L V8	**D**	–

== Statistics ==
- Pole Position – #11 AMG-Mercedes – 1:41.865
- Fastest Lap – #11 AMG-Mercedes – 1:45.013
- Distance – 692.340 km
- Average Speed – 171.930 km/h

FIA GT Championship
Previous race: 1997 FIA GT Donington 4 Hours	1997 season	Next race: 1997 FIA GT Sebring 3 Hours
