= Porsche Boxster and Cayman (981) =

Third generation of the Boxster and second generation of the Cayman sports cars

Porsche 981
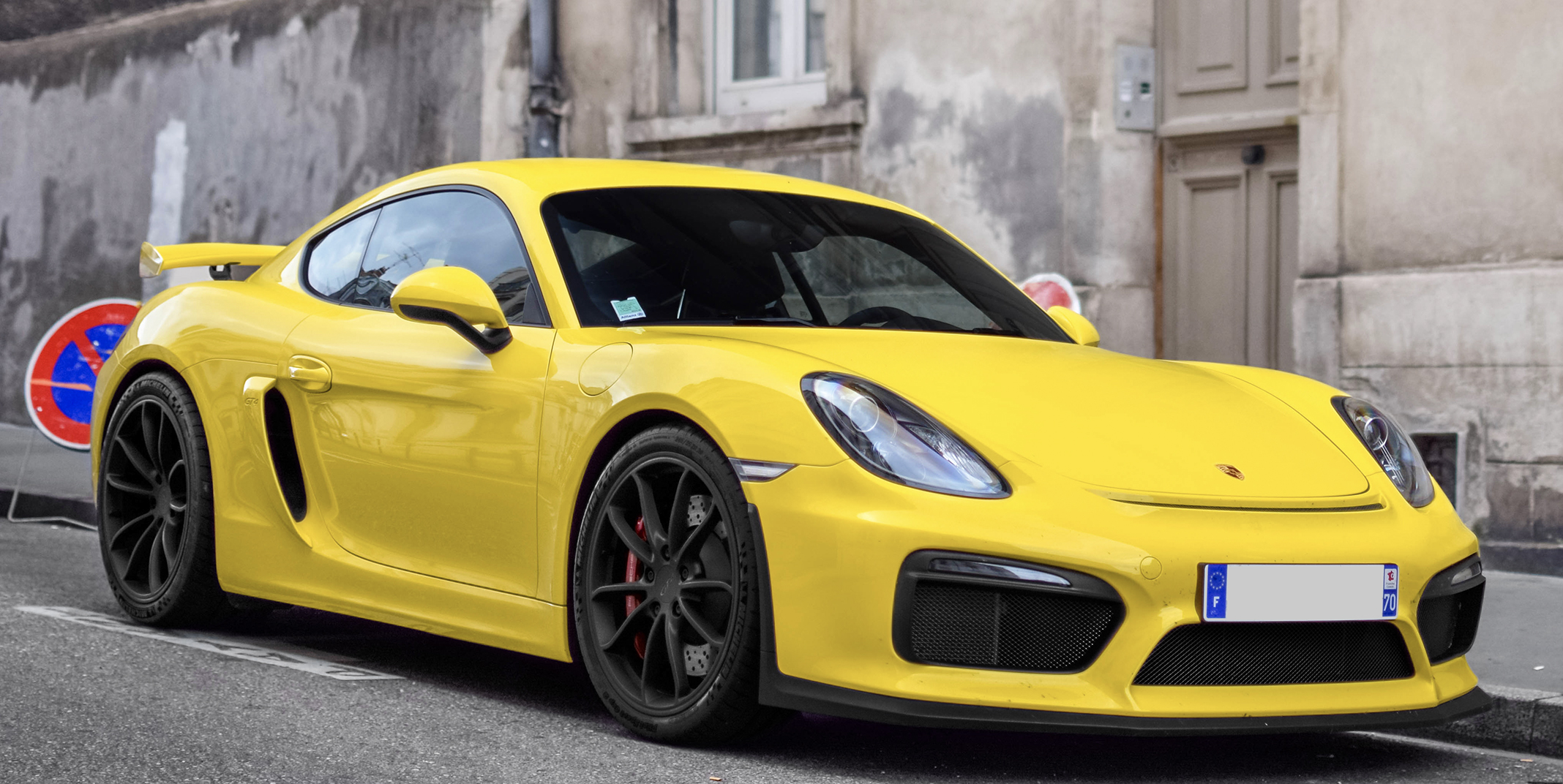
- Porsche Cayman GT4 (981)

Overview
- Also called: Porsche Boxster; Porsche Cayman
- Production: 2012–2016
- Assembly: Germany: Stuttgart, Zuffenhausen, Osnabrück
- Designer: Tony Hatter (exterior); Hugh Robinson (981 Cayman; 2011)

Body and chassis
- Class: Sports car (S)
- Body style: 2-door roadster; 2-door fastback coupé
- Layout: Mid-engine, rear-wheel drive

Powertrain
- Engine: 2.7 L MA1.22 flat-6; 3.4 L MA1.23 flat-6; 3.8 L MA1.24 flat-6
- Transmission: 7-speed PDK; 6-speed manual

Dimensions
- Wheelbase: Boxster: 2,475 mm (97.4 in); Cayman: 2,475 mm (97.4 in)
- Length: Boxster: 4,374 mm (172.2 in); 4,404 mm (173.4 in) (GTS); Cayman: 4,380 mm (172.4 in)
- Width: Boxster: 1,801 mm (70.9 in); Cayman: 1,801 mm (70.9 in)
- Height: Boxster: 1,282 mm (50.5 in); 1,273 mm (50.1 in) (GTS); Cayman: 1,295 mm (51 in)
- Curb weight: Boxster (manual): 1,330 kg (2,930 lb); Boxster (PDK): 1,360 kg (3,000 lb); Boxster S (manual): 1,340 kg (2,950 lb); Boxster S (PDK): 1,370 kg (3,020 lb); Boxster GTS (manual): 1,345 kg (2,965 lb); Boxster GTS (PDK): 1,375 kg (3,031 lb); Boxster Spyder: 1,315 kg (2,899 lb); Cayman (manual): 1,310 kg (2,890 lb); Cayman (PDK): 1,340 kg (2,950 lb); Cayman S (manual): 1,320 kg (2,910 lb); Cayman S (PDK): 1,350 kg (2,980 lb); Cayman GTS (manual): 1,345 kg (2,965 lb); Cayman GTS (PDK): 1,375 kg (3,031 lb); Cayman GT4: 1,340 kg (2,955 lb)

Chronology
- Predecessor: Porsche 987
- Successor: Porsche 982

The Porsche 981 is the internal designation given to the third-generation Boxster/Cayman (second-generation Cayman) models built by German automobile manufacturer Porsche. It was announced on 13 March 2012 at the Geneva Auto Show with sales starting in early summer 2012.

The 981 reflects the new design language from the 911 (991) and 918, and features revised engine and transmission specifications. The chassis had been revised: it is 40 percent more torsionally rigid, the front track is 40 mm (1.6 in) wider, the rear track is 18 mm (0.7 in) wider, and the wheelbase has been extended by 60 mm (2.4 in). There is a small weight reduction of up to 35 kg (77 lb) compared to the outgoing 987. The 981 was the first Boxster/Cayman to use electronically assisted steering, and the parking brake in the car uses an electronic linkage. The instrument cluster features a 4.6" TFT color screen in conjunction with various sensors that can display accurate engine temperature, oil temperature and oil pressure. The Sport Chrono Package includes dynamic gearbox mounts. Another new feature was the auto start/stop system.

It was succeeded by the Porsche 982.

== Boxster ==
The standard Boxster is fitted with a new 2.7-litre flat-6 engine, and the Boxster S is fitted with the existing 3.4-litre engine but with revised performance. The 2.7-litre engine is rated at 194 kW (260 hp) while the 3.4-litre engine is rated at 231 kW (310 hp). Both engines are equipped with a 6-speed manual gearbox and an optional 7-speed reworked PDK. Both manual and automatic models are available with several technical options, including Porsche Torque Vectoring (PTV) and a Sport Chrono Package that includes active transmission mounts and makes the PDK-equipped model even faster. Porsche claims that the new generation Boxster provides fuel savings of 15% over the outgoing model.

=== Boxster GTS ===
The range was expanded in March 2014 with the addition of the GTS derivative, with slightly altered front and rear bumpers and an additional 11 kW (15 hp) from the 3.4-litre engine.

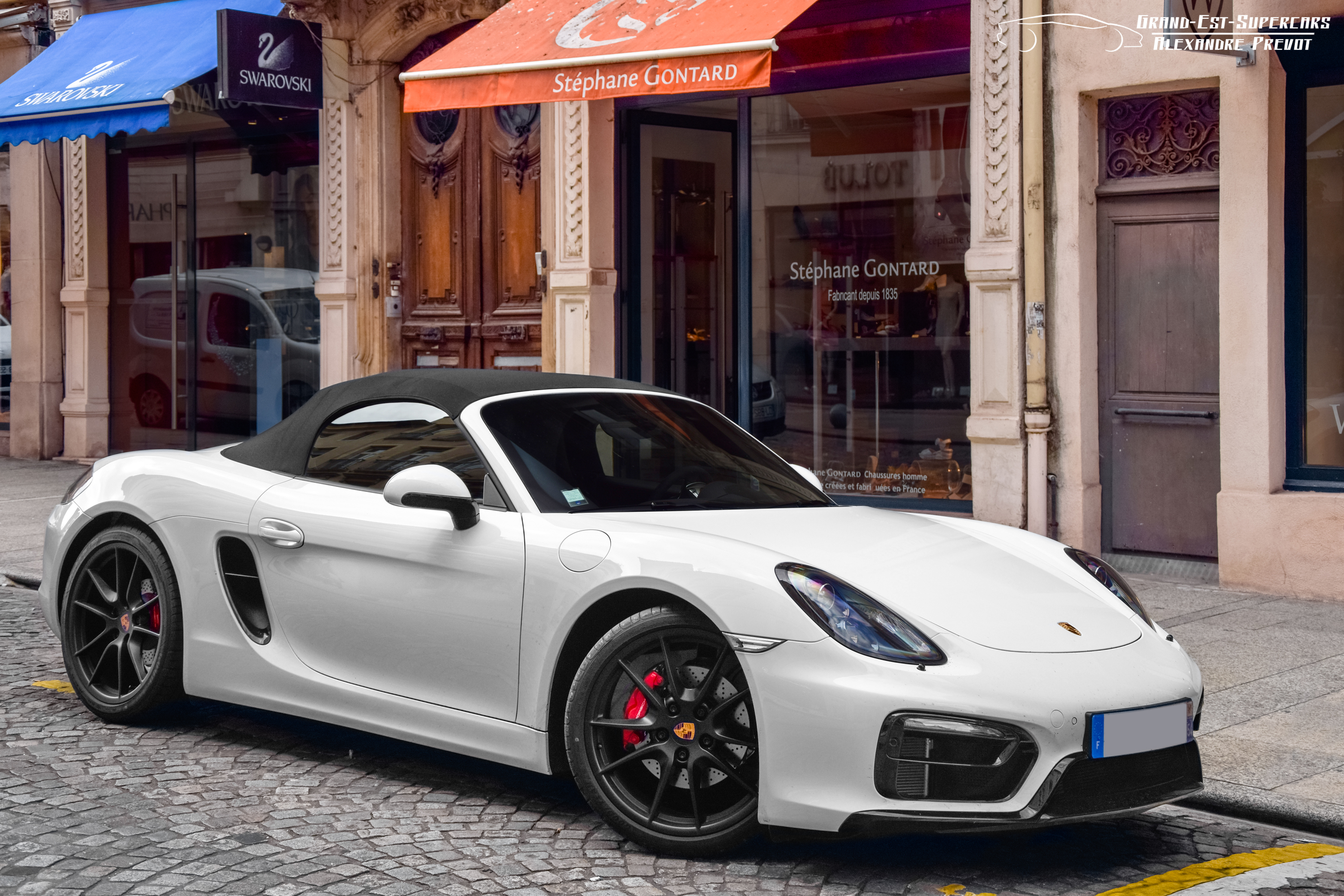
Porsche 981 Boxster GTS (2014)

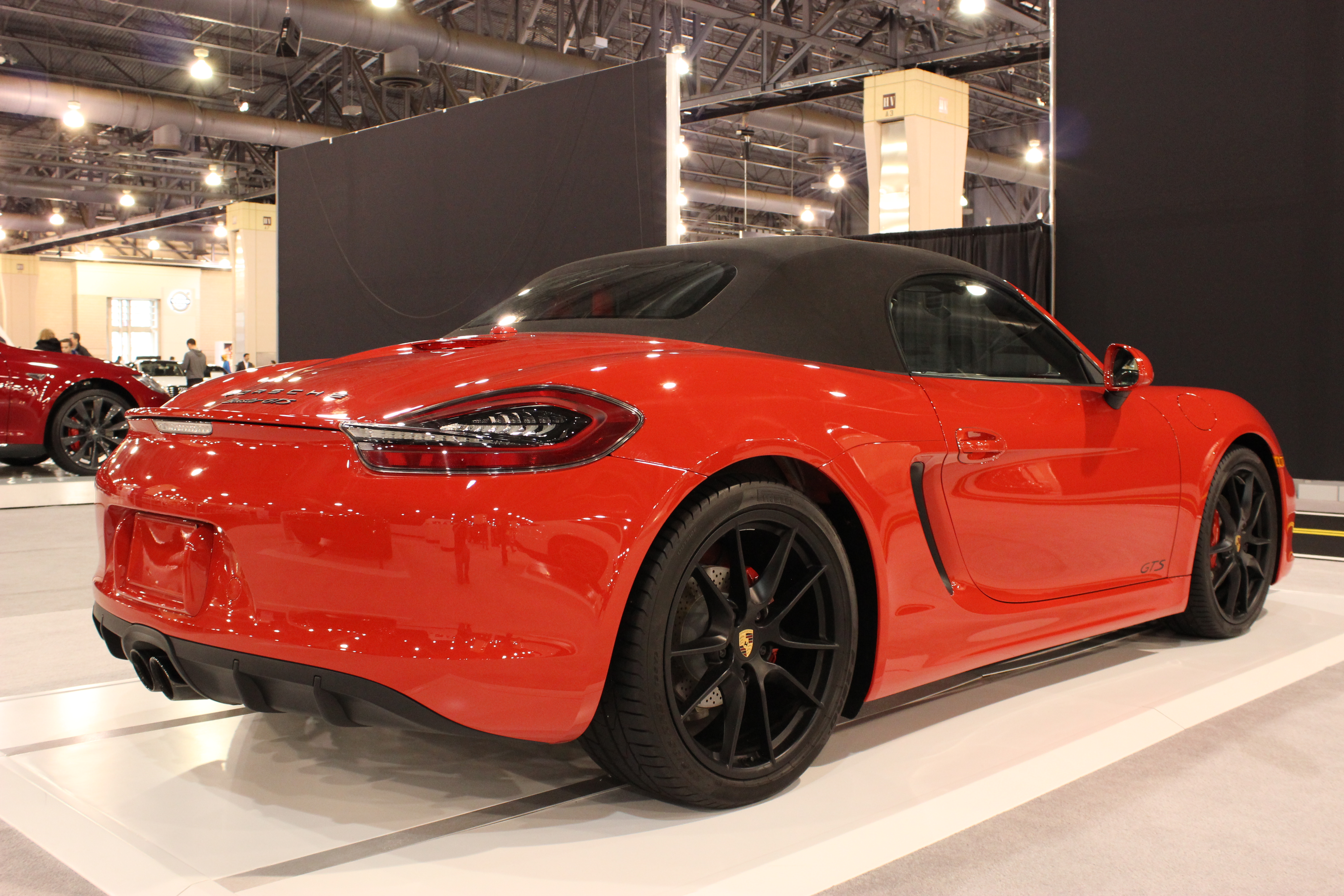
Rear view

=== Boxster Spyder ===
Porsche unveiled the latest Boxster Spyder based on the 981 Boxster in April 2015 at the New York Auto Show. The Spyder is a lightweight high performance version of the Boxster and the lightest Porsche in the model lineup at the time, weighing 1,315 kg (2,899 lb). It is powered by the largest and most powerful engine used in a Boxster at the time, a 3.8 litre flat-6 shared with the Cayman GT4 and 911 Carrera S, rated at 375 hp (280 kW). This allowed the car to attain a top speed of 290 km/h (180 mph). The Spyder is only available with a 6 speed manual transmission. The styling of the car is similar to the previous generation Spyder, continuing the twin hump rear deck and manually operated canvas top. It also shares some styling with the Cayman GT4, using the same front and rear fascia.

The Spyder's lightweight design was achieved through the use of aluminum doors and rear boot lid, a manually operated canvas soft top with electronic assist, and unique lightweight 20 inch wheels. The manual soft top results in a weight saving of 24 lb (11 kg) over the standard Boxster's electric powered top. Interior door handles were replaced with nylon door pulls for a weight savings of 1.2 lb (1 kg). The air conditioning and audio system were also removed, although they could be added as no cost options. Total weight savings amounted to 66 lb (30 kg) when compared to a manual-equipped Boxster GTS despite the Spyder's upsized engine and chassis upgrades.

The Spyder is the only model from the 981 generation to feature an updated faster ratio steering rack shared with 911 Turbo S for improved steering response and feel. It is equipped with a smaller diameter GT steering wheel used in both the 911 GT3 and Cayman GT4. The Spyder's brakes are enlarged over other Boxster models, using six-piston calipers with 340 mm rotors at the front and four-piston calipers with 330 mm rotors at the rear shared with the 911 Carrera S. The Spyder features a sports suspension with 20mm lower ride height than the standard Boxster. A limited slip differential with Porsche Torque Vectoring shared with the Cayman GT4 was also used.

Reception was positive with high marks for its lightweight chassis and handling balance. Some reviewers preferred the Boxster Spyder's chassis setup to the Cayman GT4's, even if the latter has more ultimate grip. The Spyder was a limited-production model with 2,486 units in total made with 829 of those destined for North America.

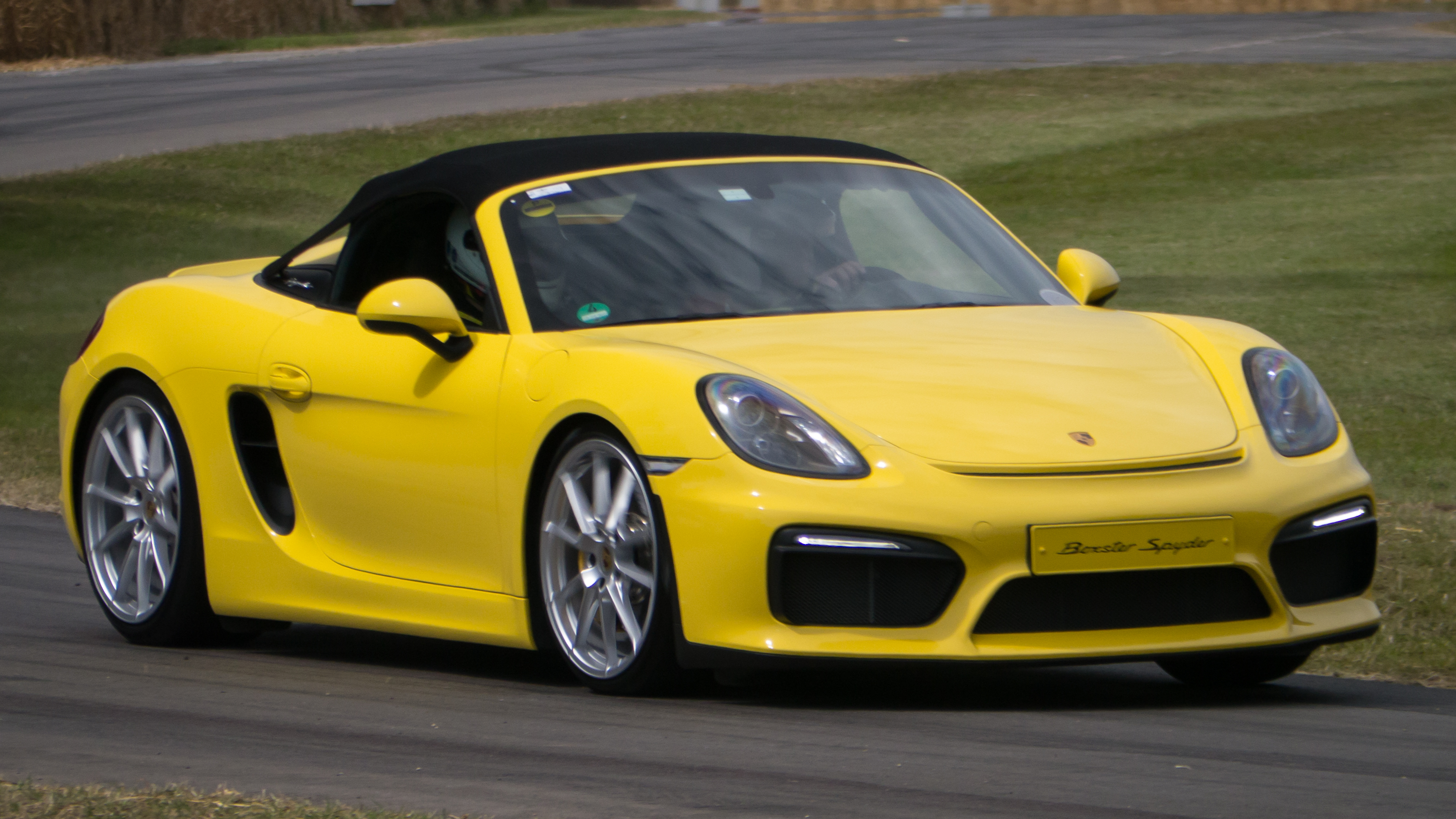
Porsche Boxster Spyder

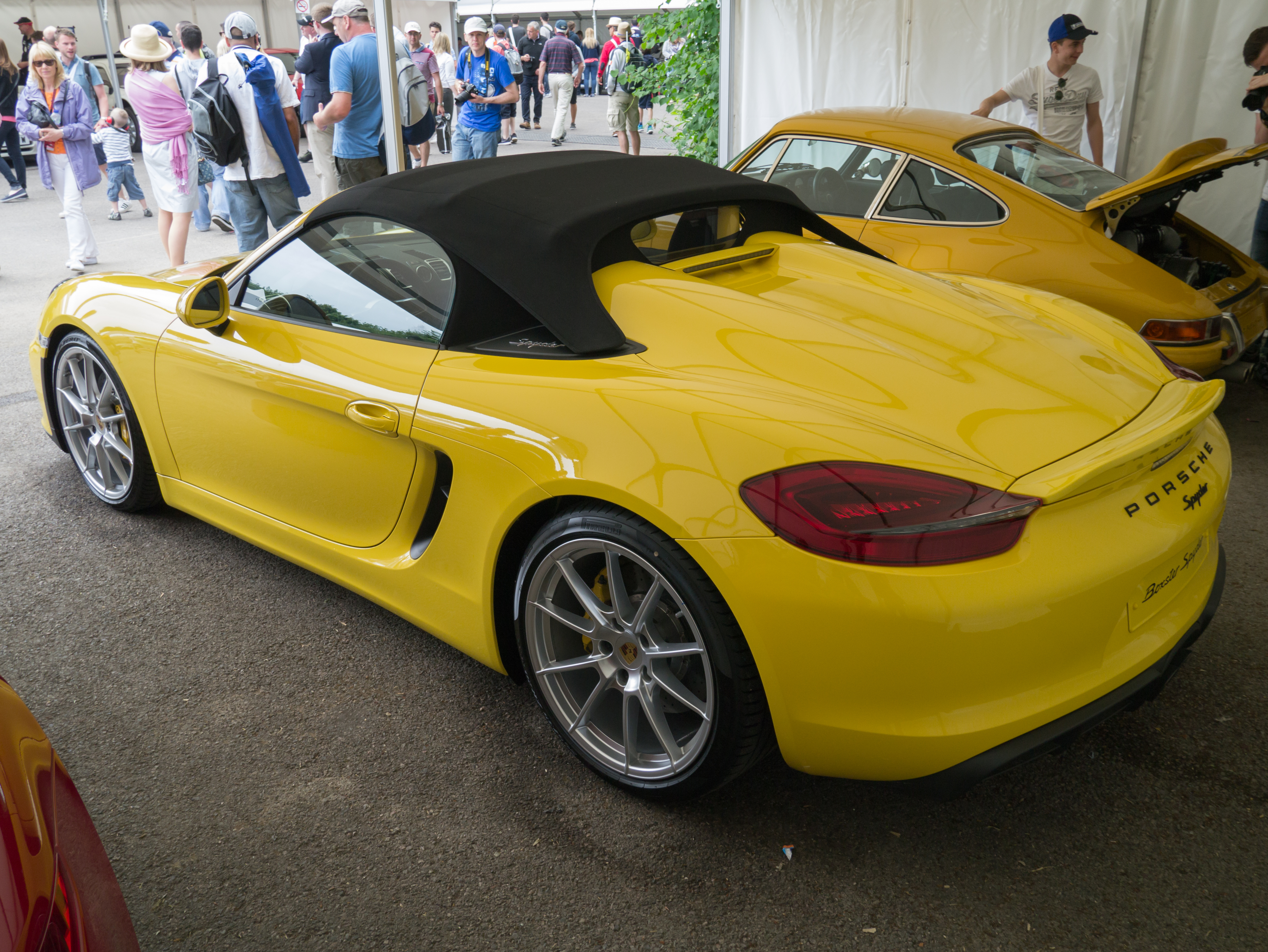
Rear view

=== Boxster Bergspyder ===
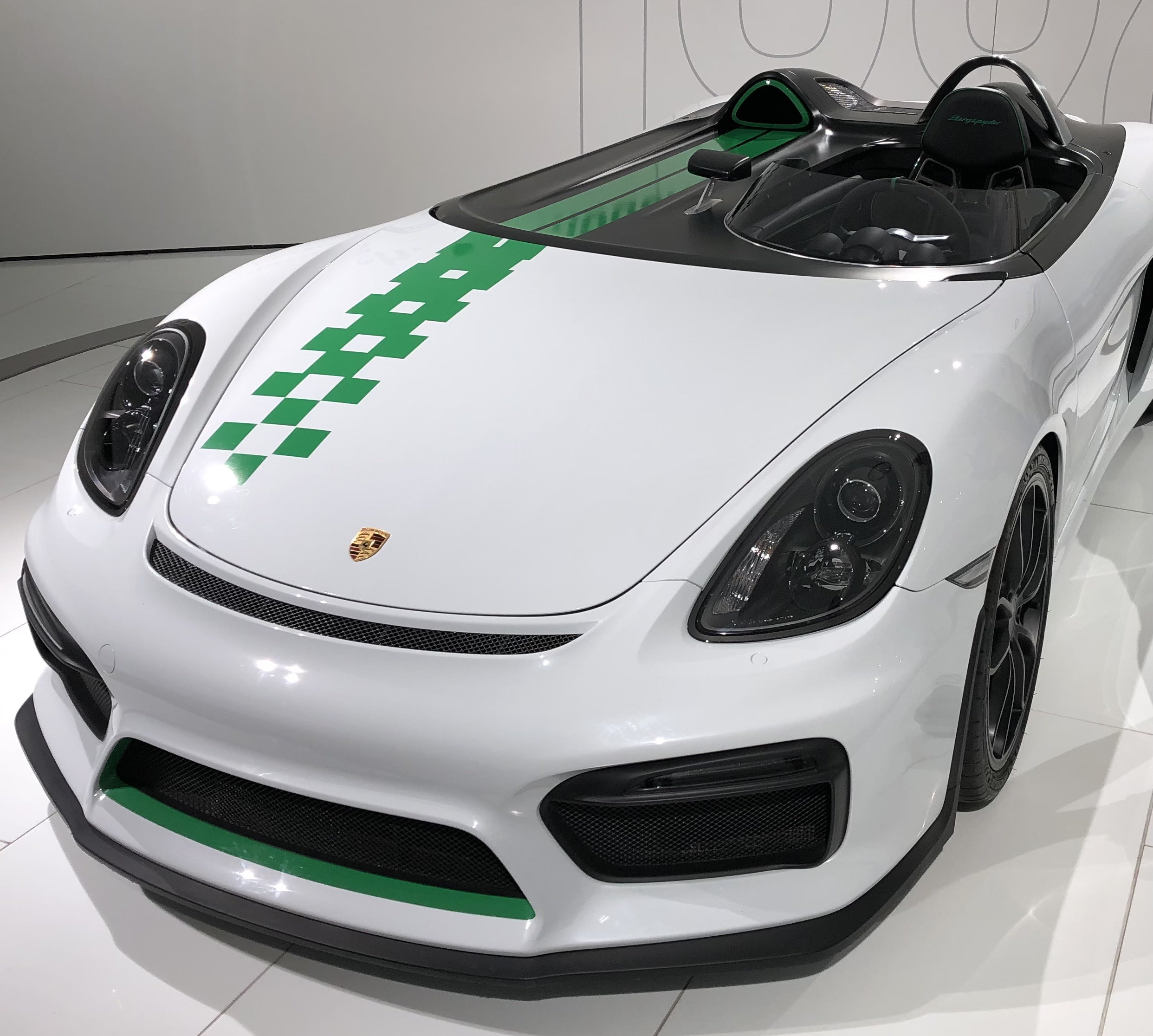
Boxster Bergspyder at the Porsche Museum

In 2019, Porsche revealed that in 2015, the executive board commissioned a project group from Weissach to build a sports car based on the 981, that was to be as light and minimalist as possible. 50 years ago, Porsche's engineers had built a car using similar constraints: the Porsche 909 Bergspyder. The 981 Bergspyder never entered production as it failed feasibility tests.

=== Specifications ===
Year	Engine	Power	Torque	Transmission (gears)	0–100 km/h (62 mph)	0–60 mph (97 km/h)	Top speed	CO_{2}
2012	2.7 L (2,706 cc) Base	265 PS (261 hp; 195 kW)	280 N⋅m (207 lb⋅ft)	Manual (6)	5.8 seconds	5.5 seconds	264 km/h (164 mph)	192g/km
2012	2.7 L (2,706 cc) Base	265 PS (261 hp; 195 kW)	280 N⋅m (207 lb⋅ft)	PDK (7)	5.7 seconds	5.4 seconds	262 km/h (163 mph)	180g/km
2012	2.7 L (2,706 cc) Base	265 PS (261 hp; 195 kW)	280 N⋅m (207 lb⋅ft)	PDK Sport Chrono (7)	5.5 seconds	5.2 seconds	262 km/h (163 mph)	180g/km
2012	3.4 L (3,436 cc)S	315 PS (311 hp; 232 kW)	360 N⋅m (266 lb⋅ft)	Manual (6)	5.1 seconds	4.8 seconds	279 km/h (173 mph)	206g/km
2012	3.4 L (3,436 cc)S	315 PS (311 hp; 232 kW)	360 N⋅m (266 lb⋅ft)	PDK (7)	5.0 seconds	4.7 seconds	277 km/h (172 mph)	188g/km
2012	3.4 L (3,436 cc)S	315 PS (311 hp; 232 kW)	360 N⋅m (266 lb⋅ft)	PDK Sport Chrono (7)	4.8 seconds	4.5 seconds	277 km/h (172 mph)	188g/km
2014	3.4 L (3,436 cc) GTS	330 PS (325 hp; 243 kW)	370 N⋅m (273 lb⋅ft)	Manual (6)	5.0 seconds		281 km/h (175 mph)	211g/km
2014	3.4 L (3,436 cc) GTS	330 PS (325 hp; 243 kW)	370 N⋅m (273 lb⋅ft)	PDK (7)	4.7 seconds		279 km/h (173 mph)	190g/km
2015	3.8 L (3,800 cc) Spyder	375 PS (370 hp; 276 kW)	420 N⋅m (310 lb⋅ft)	Manual (6)	4.5 seconds	4.3 seconds	290 km/h (180 mph)	230g/km

The 2.7 has a drag coefficient of Cd=0.30, the S Cd=0.31, the GTS Cd=0.32 and the Spyder Cd=0.33.

== Cayman ==
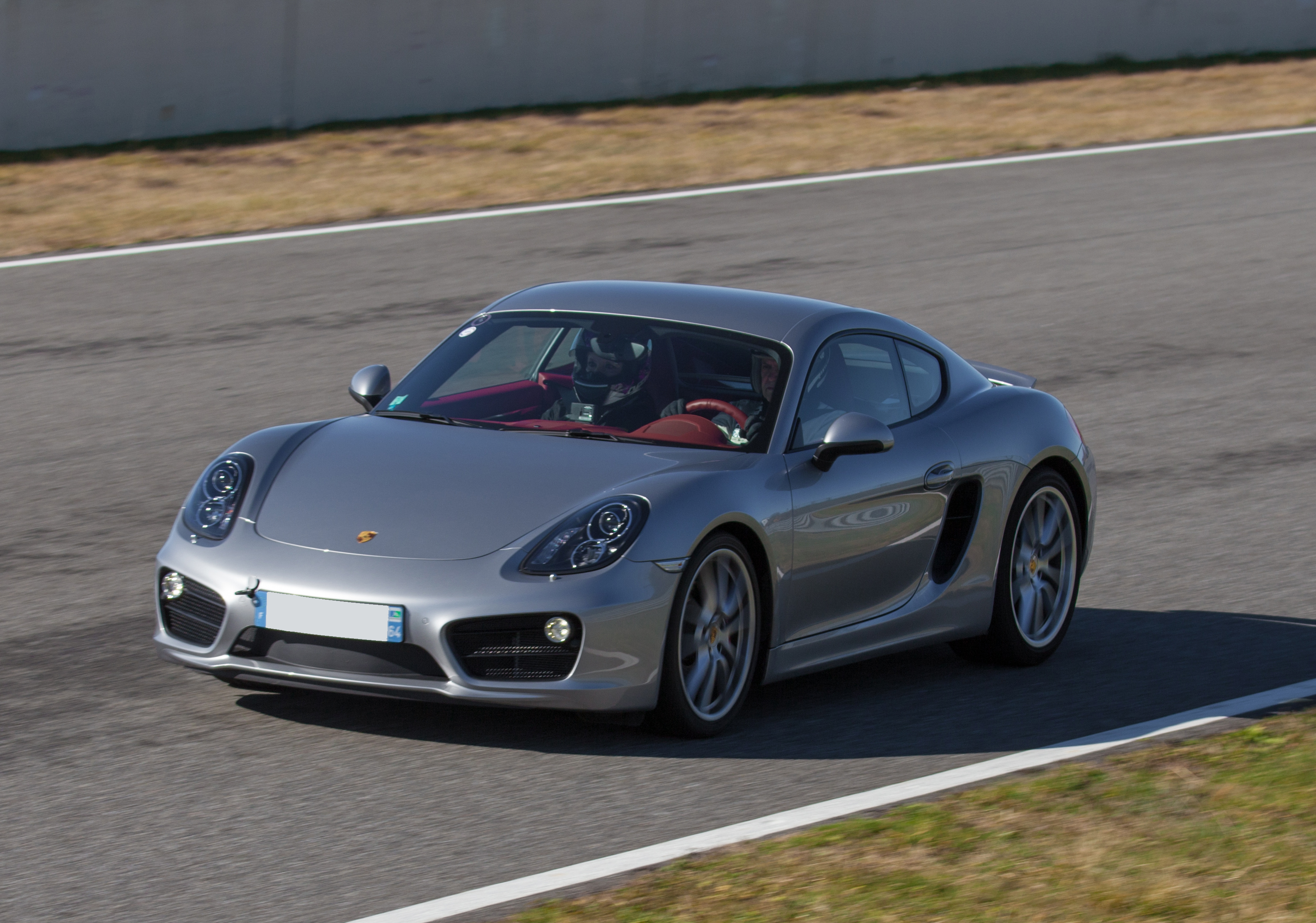
Porsche Cayman S (981C)

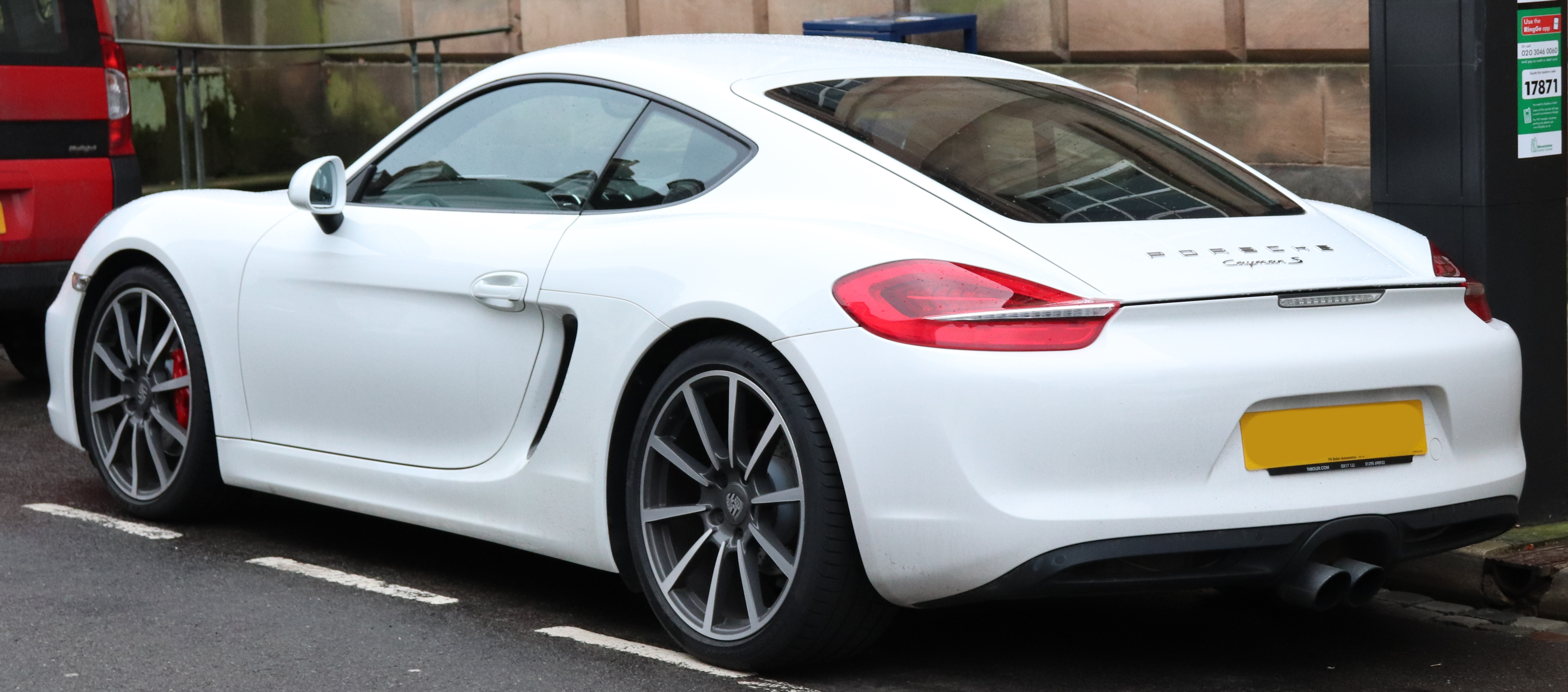
Rear view

The second generation Cayman was unveiled at the 2012 Geneva Motor Show. The production version was introduced as a 2014 model in the spring of 2013. The new car was available in both the standard trim with a 2.7-litre engine, and in the S trim with a 3.4-litre engine. Both versions were available with either a 6-speed manual or a dual-clutch 7-speed PDK transmission.

The 981 features upgrades including a new body, a longer wheelbase, a wider front track, and a redesigned interior that matches the firm's contemporary 911 models.

The new model gained acclaim in the motoring press as one of the best handling sports cars at any price, due to its-mid engine layout and driving dynamics. The Cayman S benefitted from the same engine and running gear as Porsche's latest 3.4-litre version of the 911.

=== Cayman GTS ===
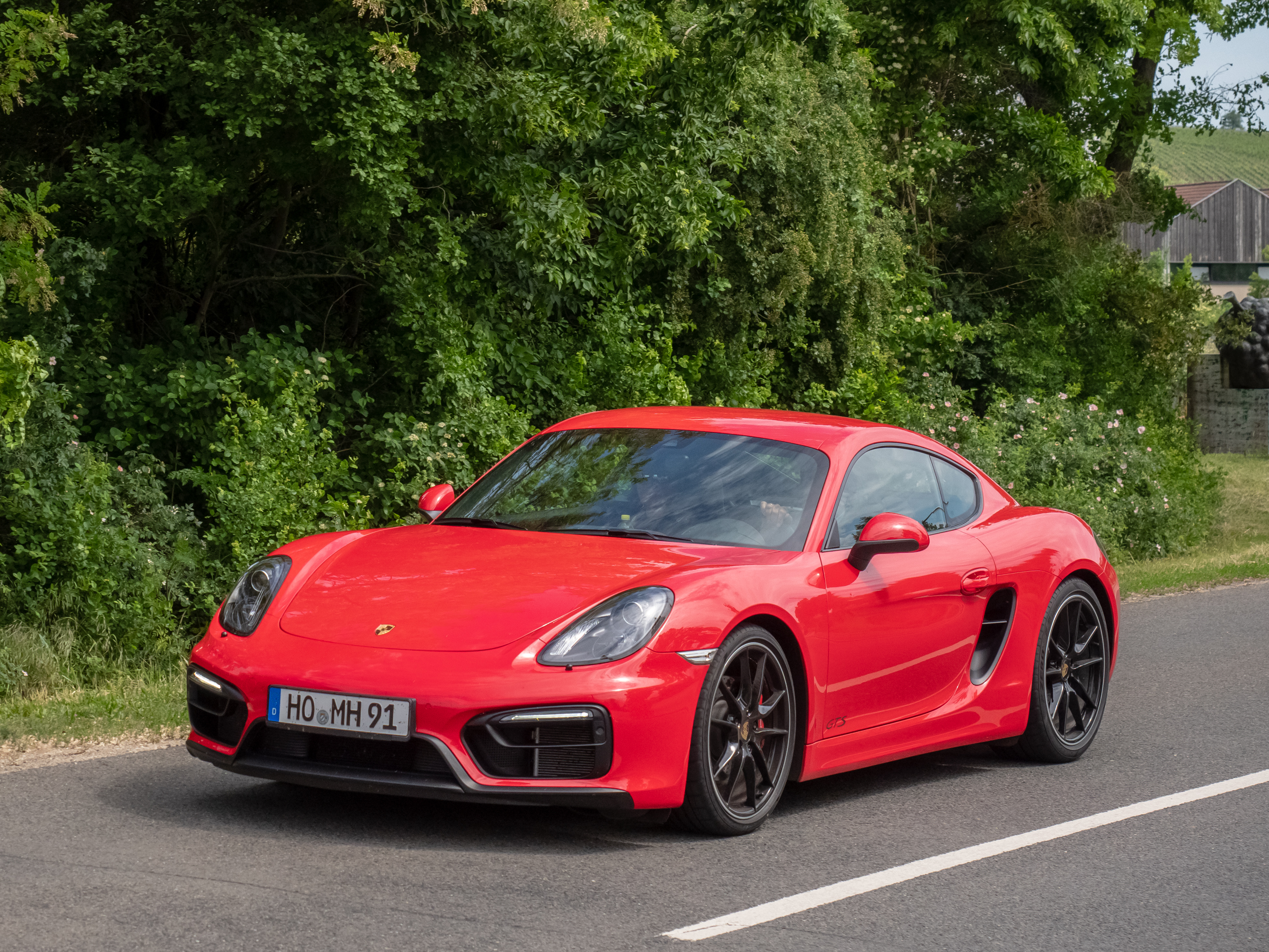
Porsche Cayman GTS (981C)

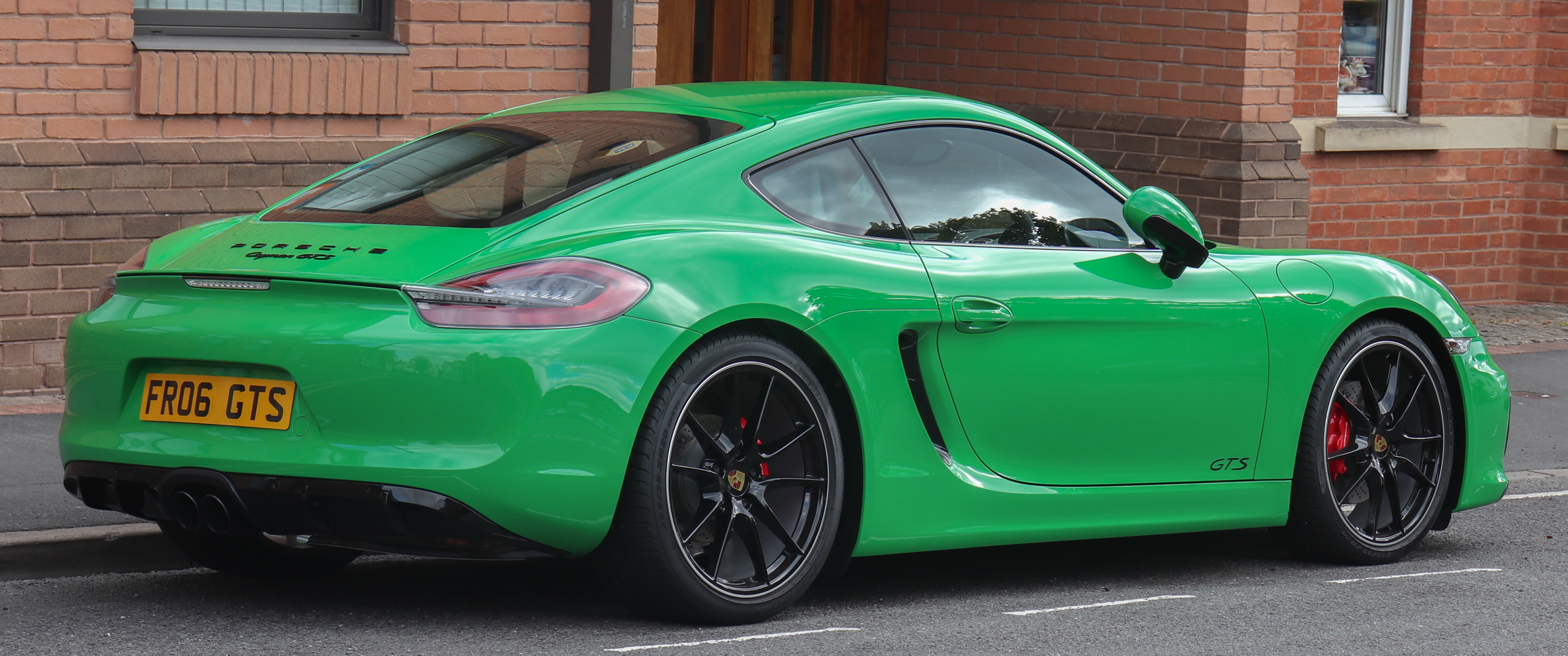
Rear view

The Cayman GTS was introduced in 2014, and is based on the 981 platform. It featured a marginally more powerful engine, a new body kit, new 20-inch Carrera S wheels, new Bi-Xenon headlights, and a new sports exhaust system. The Cayman GTS is longer than the Cayman and the Cayman S by 30.5 mm (1.2 in) due to its bumpers. The new, optional passive sport suspension allows the Cayman GTS to have a 20 mm lower ride height compared to the Cayman equipped with standard passive suspension or 10 mm lower compared to one with the standard-equipped PASM. The engine is rated at 254 kW (341 hp), and can achieve a 0–100 km/h (0–62 mph) acceleration time of 4.9 seconds with the manual transmission, 4.7 seconds with PDK and 4.5 seconds with PDK and Sport Plus mode, which is activated via the now standard Sports Chrono Package. The Cayman GTS weighs 1,385 kg (3,053 lb) with the manual transmission and can attain a top speed of 285 km/h (177 mph) while the Cayman GTS with PDK can reach 282 km/h (175 mph) and weighs 1,375 kg (3,031 lb). The configuration changes made over a standard Cayman S resemble closely what Porsche did to its predecessors through Cayman S Sport and Cayman R in the 987 generation models.

=== Cayman GT4 ===
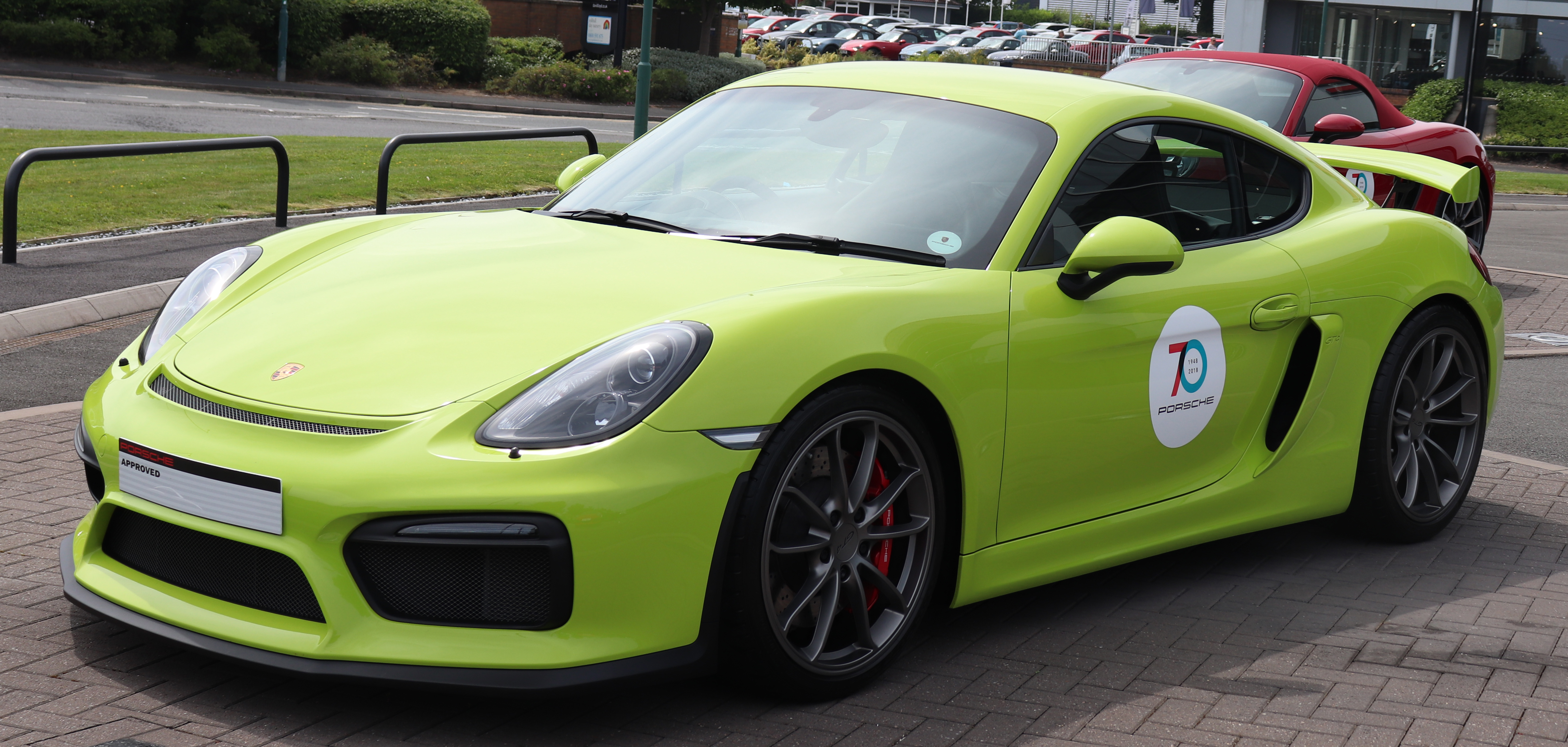
Porsche Cayman GT4

In 2015, a high performance track oriented version of the Cayman, named the Cayman GT4 was introduced, using a revised and a slightly de-tuned version of the 3.8-litre flat-six engine from the 911 (991) Carrera S. The GT4 was available only with a 6 speed manual transmission and weighed 1,340 kg (2,954 lb). It has a vented front bumper to improve cooling for the additional radiator, with a lower lip spoiler as well as a fixed rear wing for providing downforce. Compared to the standard Cayman, it features a 30 mm lower ride height, upgraded brakes from the 991 GT3, a limited slip differential combined with Porsche Torque Vectoring, and Porsche Active Suspension Management with dampers derived from the 991 GT3. A number of reinforcements were also made throughout the chassis to keep it stiff and well balanced. A Club Sport Package is also available, featuring a rear half rollcage, preparation for a battery cut off switch, a fire extinguisher and a six-point racing harness for the driver, compatible with a neck saving HANS device. Sport Chrono Package with unique Track Precision app is also available specifically for the GT4, adding an additional ECU to the car to deliver telemetry data to the driver's smartphone. In the United Kingdom, the GT4 could be ordered before its introduction at the 2015 Geneva Motor Show in March, and the first cars would arrive in dealerships in March. The Cayman GT4 has a projected Nürburgring Nordschleife lap time of 7 minutes 40 seconds and has a top speed of 183 mph (295 km/h). The GT4 has gained rave reviews from magazines like Evo and the likes of Chris Harris.

=== Cayman GT4 Clubsport ===
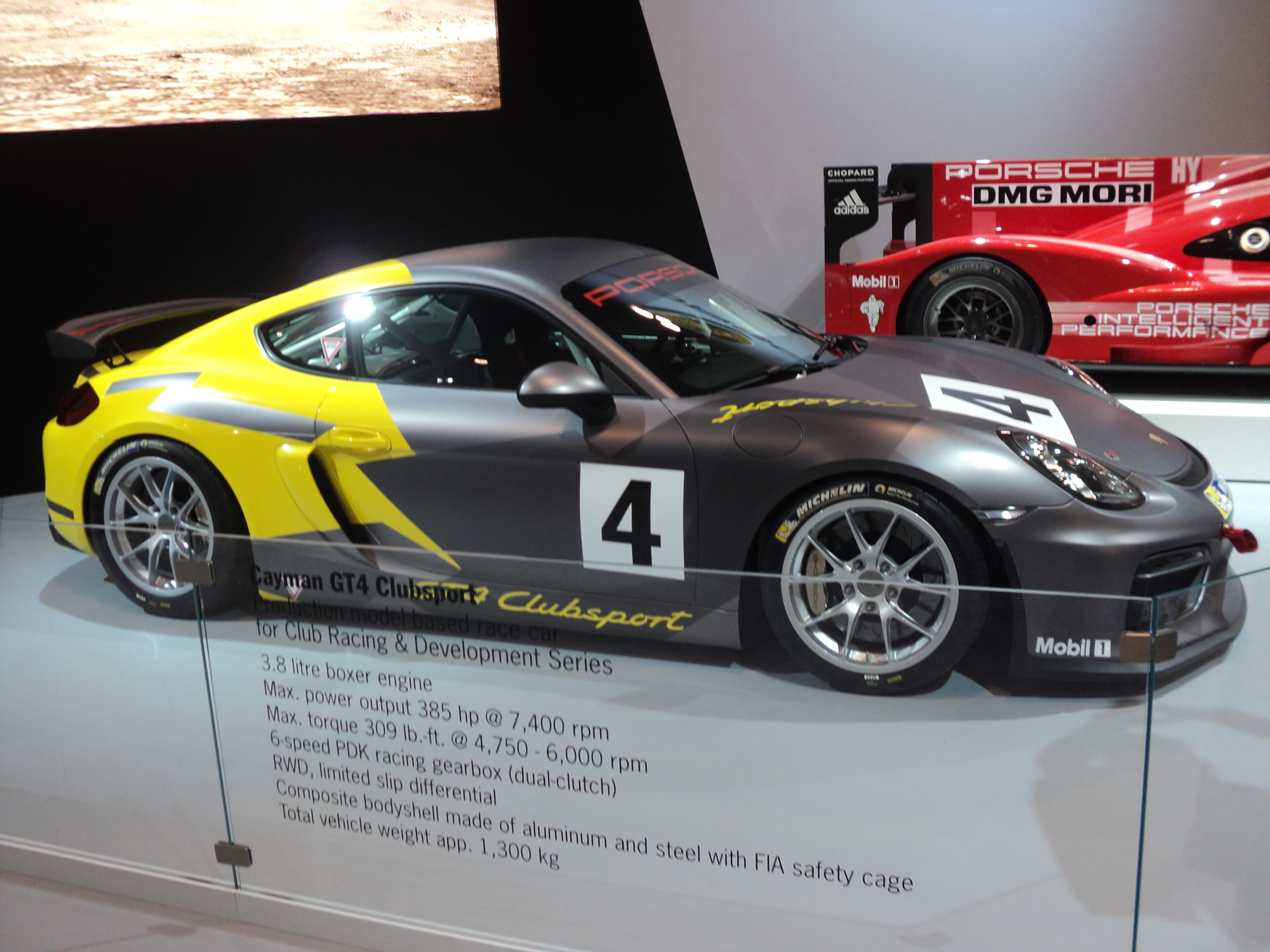
Porsche Cayman GT4 Clubsport shown at the 2016 Canadian International Auto Show in Toronto

On 6 October 2015, Porsche announced a racing version of the Cayman GT4 called the Cayman GT4 Clubsport. Developed by Porsche Motorsport, the Cayman GT4 Clubsport made its debut at the 2015 LA Auto Show in November. It is powered by the same 3.8-litre boxer 6 cylinder engine rated at 283 kW (380 hp) at 7,400 rpm and 420 N⋅m (310 lb⋅ft) of torque at 4,750 rpm found on the production Cayman GT4.

As opposed to the road going Cayman GT4, the Clubsport version is fitted with Porsche's PDK double clutch transmission (albeit with the 7th gear disabled) with shift paddles on the steering wheel, as well as mechanical rear-axle locking differential. The Cayman GT4 Clubsport weighs 1,300 kg (2,866 lb) and shares the same Performance Friction brakes and lightweight suspension strut front axle found on the Porsche 991 GT3 Cup. Its ABS is adjustable in 12 steps. A 100-litre FIA-approved "bag" fuel tank is available as an option for endurance racing. In addition to its lightweight features, it is supplied fitted with an FIA welded-in roll-cage, six-point harness and racing bucket seats.

Sales of the new Cayman GT4 Clubsport commenced after its debut in November through Porsche Motorsport in Weissach or Porsche Motorsport North America.

=== Specifications ===
Type	Engine	Transmission	Power	Torque	0–100 km/h (0–62 mph)	0–160 km/h (0–99 mph)	0–200 km/h (0–124 mph)	Top Speed	Fuel Consumption City/Highway (US Gallons)	Fuel Consumption Urban/Extra Urban/Combined (UK Gallons)	Fuel Consumption Urban/Extra Urban/Combined (Metric)	CO2
Cayman	2.7 L	Manual (6)	275 PS (202 kW; 271 hp) at 7400 rpm	213 lb⋅ft (289 N⋅m)	5.7 s	12.9 s	—	265 km/h (165 mph)	20 mpg / 30 mpg	24.8 / 44.8 / 34.4 mpg	11.4 / 6.3 / 8.2 L/100 km	192 g/km
Cayman	2.7 L	PDK (7)	275 PS (202 kW; 271 hp) at 7400 rpm	213 lb⋅ft (289 N⋅m)	5.6 s / 5.4 s (Note: using launch control in Sport Plus)	12.8 s / 12.5 s	—	264 km/h (164 mph)	22 mpg / 32 mpg	26.6 / 47.9 / 36.7 mpg	10.6 / 5.9 / 7.7 L/100 km	180 g/km
Cayman S	3.4 L	Manual (6)	325 PS (239 kW; 321 hp) at 7400 rpm	273 lb⋅ft (370 N⋅m)	5.0 s	10.8 s	—	282 km/h (175 mph)	20 mpg / 28 mpg	23.2 / 40.9 / 32.1 mpg	12.2 / 6.9 / 8.8 L/100 km	206 g/km
Cayman S	3.4 L	PDK (7)	325 PS (239 kW; 321 hp) at 7400 rpm	273 lb⋅ft (370 N⋅m)	4.9 s / 4.7 s	10.7 s / 10.5 s	—	281 km/h (175 mph)	21 mpg / 30 mpg	25.2 / 45.6 / 35.3 mpg	11.2 / 6.2 / 8.0 L/100 km	188 g/km
Cayman GTS	3.4 L	Manual (6)	340 PS (250 kW; 335 hp) at 7400 rpm	280 lb⋅ft (380 N⋅m)	4.9 s	10.6 s	16.9 s	285 km/h (177 mph)	—	—	12.7 / 7.1 / 9.0 L/100 km	211 g/km
Cayman GTS	3.4 L	PDK (7)	340 PS (250 kW; 335 hp) at 7400 rpm	280 lb⋅ft (380 N⋅m)	4.8 s / 4.6 s	10.5 s, / 10.3 s	16.6 s	283 km/h (176 mph)	—	—	11.4 / 6.3 / 8.2 L/100 km	190 g/km
Cayman GT4	3.8 L	Manual (6)	385 PS (283 kW; 380 hp) at 7400 rpm	310 lb⋅ft (420 N⋅m)	4.4 s	—	14.5 s	295 km/h (183 mph)	—	—	14.8 / 7.8 / 10.3 L/100 km	238 g/km
