= BMW Z1 =

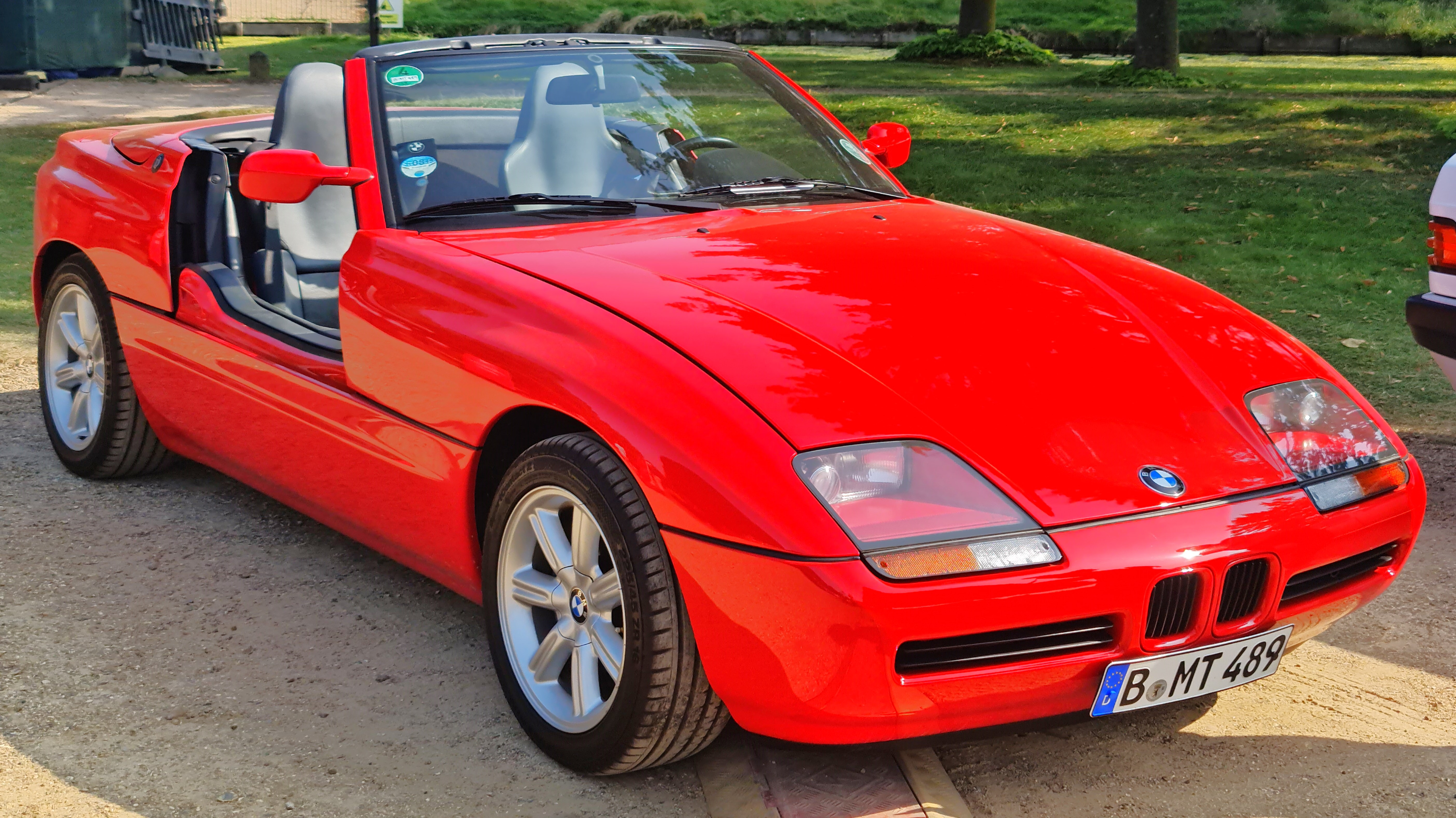

Overview
- Manufacturer: BMW
- Production: March 1989 – June 1991; 8,000 produced
- Assembly: Germany: Munich
- Designer: Harm Lagaay (1986)

Body and chassis
- Class: Roadster
- Body style: 2-seater convertible/roadster
- Layout: Front mid-engine, rear-wheel-drive
- Doors: Vertically sliding
- Related: BMW E30

Powertrain
- Engine: 2.5 L M20B25 I6
- Transmission: 5-speed GETRAG 260 Manual

Dimensions
- Wheelbase: 2,447 mm (96.3 in)
- Length: 3,921 mm (154.4 in)
- Width: 1,690 mm (67 in)
- Height: 1,227 mm (48.3 in)
- Curb weight: 1,250 kg (2,760 lb)

Chronology
- Predecessor: BMW 507
- Successor: BMW Z3

The BMW Z1 is a sports car which was produced in limited numbers by German manufacturer BMW from 1989 to 1991. It is the first model in BMW's line of Z series roadsters (two-seater convertibles).

The Z1 is unique for its plastic body panels and vertically sliding doors which drop into the door sills. It is one of the first BMWs to use a multi-link rear suspension. The sole drivetrain specification is the 2.5-litre straight-six engine and 5-speed manual transmission from the E30 325i.

In 1995, the Z1's successor, the mass-produced Z3, began production.

== Development and launch ==
At the start of 1985, BMW set up a division called BMW Technik GmbH to develop concepts for new vehicles and technologies. The director of BMW Technik GmbH was Ulrich Bez, who oversaw the Z1's development. Control of the project was turned over to Klaus Faust when Bez left BMW in October 1988. The lead designer was Harm Lagaay.

In August 1985, the BMW board gave approval to further develop the BMW Technik's first concept vehicle, the Z1. A year later, the first road-going prototype was produced and BMW publicly revealed the project. A coupe model was also the subject of a design study, but it did not reach production.

In August 1987, BMW announced that the Z1 would enter production and the following month the production form of the Z1 was unveiled at the Frankfurt Motor Show. Production began in October 1988. The original price target was DM 80,000, however by the time production began, the base price had increased to DM 83,000.

== Doors ==
The Z1 features a unique door design where the doors retract vertically into the sills of the car, instead of traditional designs which swing outward or upward. The body with its high sills, offers crash protection independent of the doors, and it is possible (although perhaps not legal in some countries) for the Z1 to be driven with the doors lowered. The first, and only other production car with retractable doors was the 1954 Kaiser Darrin, but its doors slid forwards into the fenders, not downwards.

The windows may be operated independently of the doors, although they do retract automatically if the door is lowered. Both the window and door are driven by electric motors through toothed rubber belts and may be moved manually in an emergency.

== Body ==
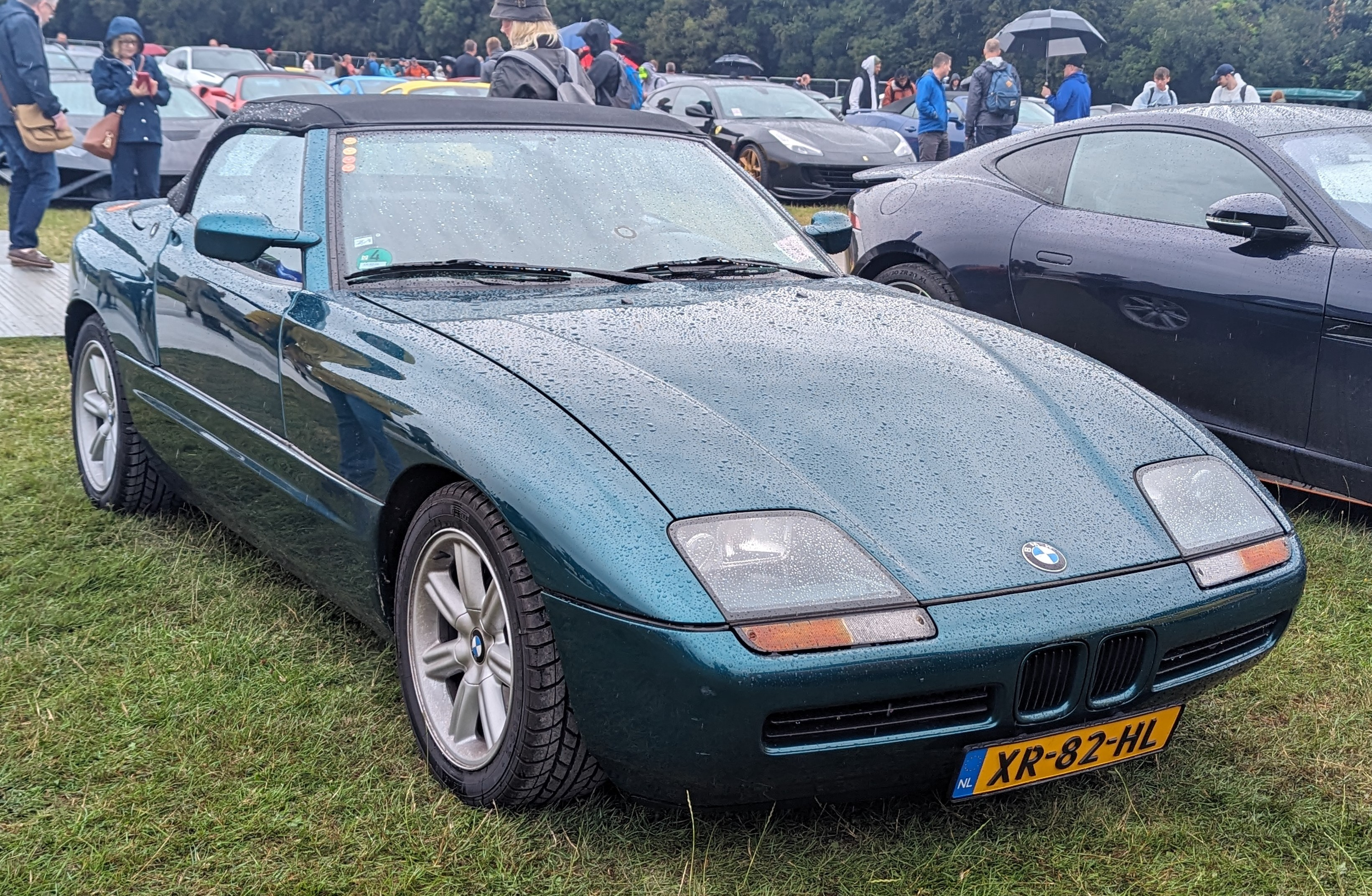
BMW Z1 with the doors and top up

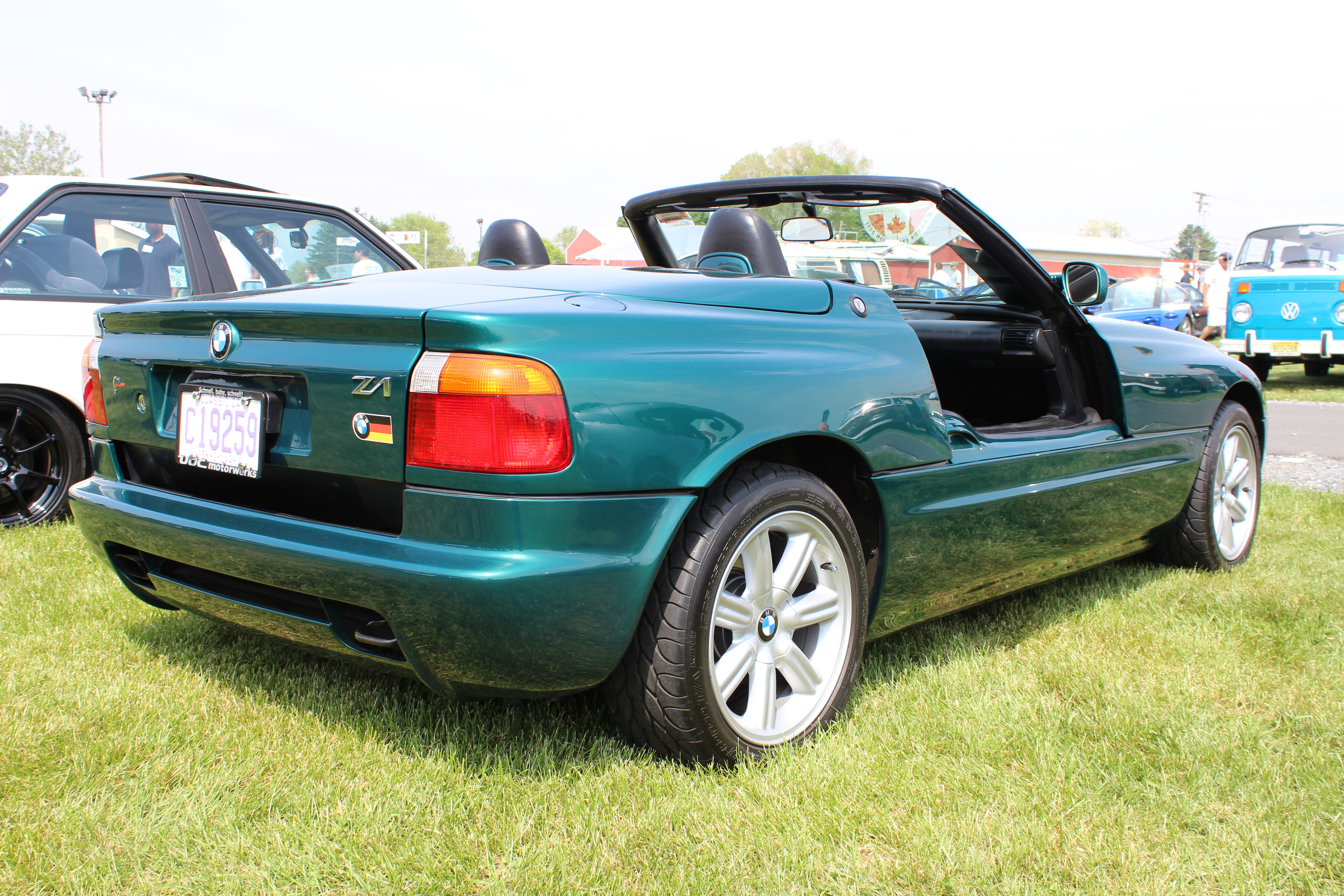
BMW Z1 rear view

In addition to the unique door design, the Z1 body featured several other innovations: removable plastic body panels, a flat undertray, a roll-hoop integrated into the windscreen surround and continuously zinc welded seams.

The side panels and doors are made of GE's Xenoy thermoplastic. The bonnet, boot, and roof cover are GRP components made by Seger + Hoffman AG. The car is painted in a special flexible lacquer finish developed jointly by AKZO Coatings and BMW Technik GmbH. During the Z1s launch, BMW suggested that owners purchase an additional set of body panels and change the color of the car from time to time. The car could actually be driven with all of the panels completely removed, similar to the Pontiac Fiero. BMW noted that the body could be completely replaced in 40 minutes, although Z1 owners have reported that this may be highly optimistic.

Aerodynamics were a focus of the vehicle design. The flat plastic undertray is used for ground effect aerodynamics and the rear bumper - in conjunction with the aerodynamically shaped muffler - forms a diffuser to reduce rear lift. The front end reportedly induces a high-pressure zone just forward of the front wheels to increase front-wheel traction. The Z1 has a drag coefficient of 0.36 with the top up or 0.43 with it down.

== Suspension ==
The rear suspension, called the Z Axle, was specially designed for the Z1. It was one of the first BMWs to feature a multi-link design. In the 1990s, the Z Axle would be used on a variety of BMW Group vehicles, including the E36 3 Series and the R40 Rover 75.

Front suspension is as per the E30 325i. Wheels, similar to the E30 325i, are 15-inch-diameter (380 mm) by 7-inch-wide (180 mm) wheels on both the front and rear, equipped with 205/55VR-15 tires.

== Drivetrain ==
The sole drivetrain configuration is a 2.5 Litre M20 straight-six engine and five-speed Getrag 260/5 manual transmission, sourced from the E30 325i. The engine is a 2,494 cc (152 cu in) SOHC straight-six engine, which produces 125 kW (168 hp) at 5,800 rpm and 222 N⋅m (164 lb⋅ft) of torque.

The engine is mounted behind the front axle for better weight distribution, and sits tilted 20 degrees to the right, to accommodate the low hoodline.

== Z Series ==
Its been rumoured that the "Z" in Z1 originally stood for Zukunft, the German word for future. Really it was simply an internal code which each department within BMW utilized. Each branch had a two digit code that started with Z. "Technik" had an internal letter code of "ZT". Cars got a two digit code starting with Z, and the Z1 was simply the first project within Technik. Later cars in the Z Series are the Z3, Z4, and Z8, which were all available as 2-seat convertibles (however some models were also available as 2-seat coupes).

== Production ==
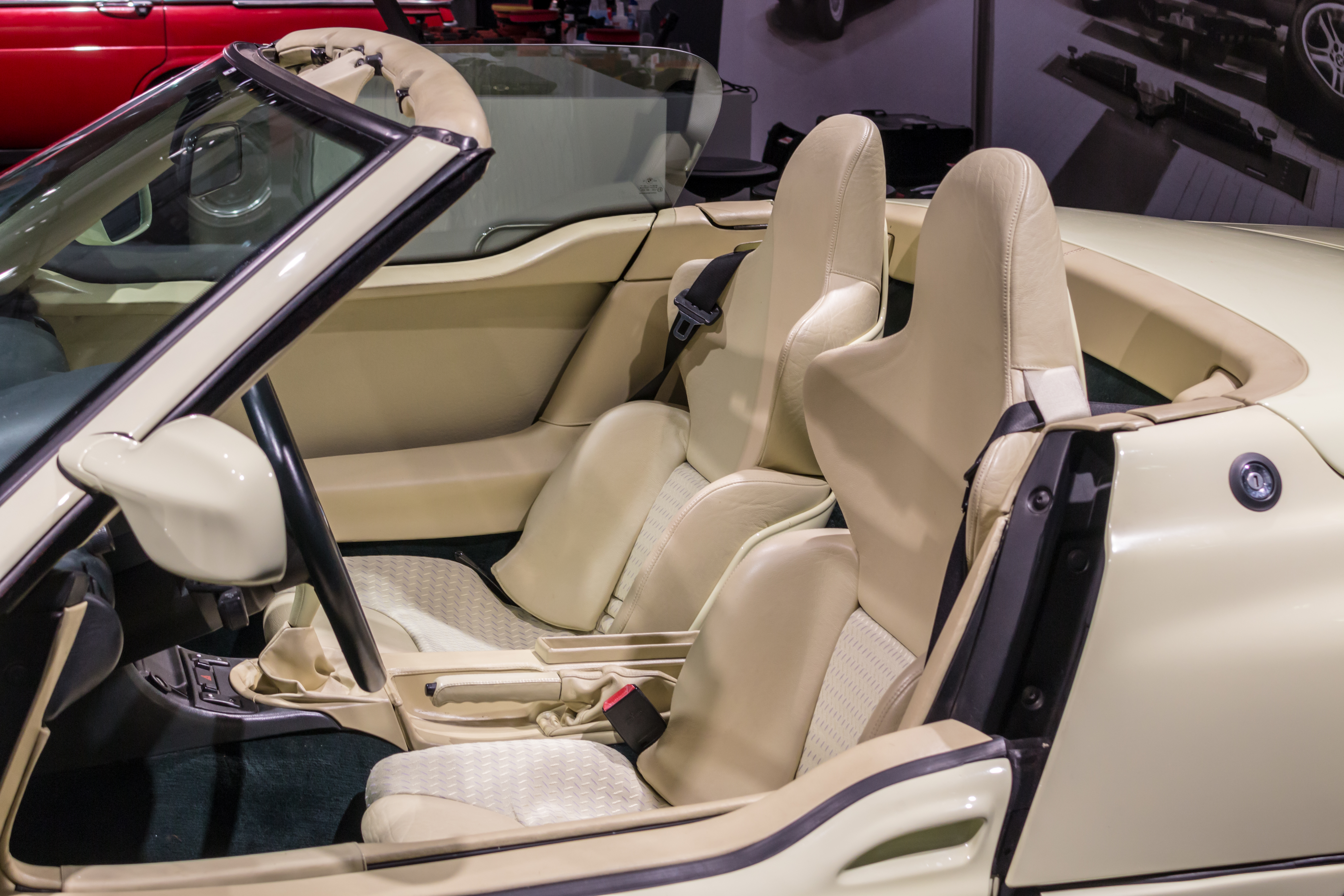
Interior

The Z1 was produced from March 1989 to June 1991, all at BMW's plant in Munich, Exactly 8,000 cars were produced. All the cars were left-hand drive, and the majority (6,443) were sold in BMW's native German market. The country to receive the second-greatest number of Z1s, Italy, received less than 7% of the total sold domestically. BMW Z1 vehicles officially imported to France for sale there have yellow headlights instead of the clear ones found elsewhere.

Initial demand was strong, with BMW receiving orders for 3,500 vehicles before production began. However, demand dropped significantly around 1988 and BMW ended production in 1991. There is speculation that the drop in demand was due to the early inflated demand from speculative investors. In 1988, however, BMW was quoted as saying that they had 35,000 orders for the Z1.

BMW was reportedly unable to build more than 10 to 20 Z1 vehicles each day. More than half of all Z1 vehicles (specifically, 4,091) were produced for the 1990 model year. Seventy-eight Z1 vehicles were reportedly used as test mules, although most were later sold without a warranty and, presumably, at a lower price.

The Z1 was available in six exterior colours and four interior colours. Red is the most common exterior color. Most (6,177) were red, black, or green with a dark grey interior. Light yellow exterior (fun-gelb in German or fun yellow in English; 133 examples made) or red interior (38 examples made) are the rarest Z1 colours. The colours swimming pool blue and oh-so-orange were reserved for the car's designers, Ulrich Bez and Harm Lagaay.
