= Porsche 989 =

Concept car developed by Porsche

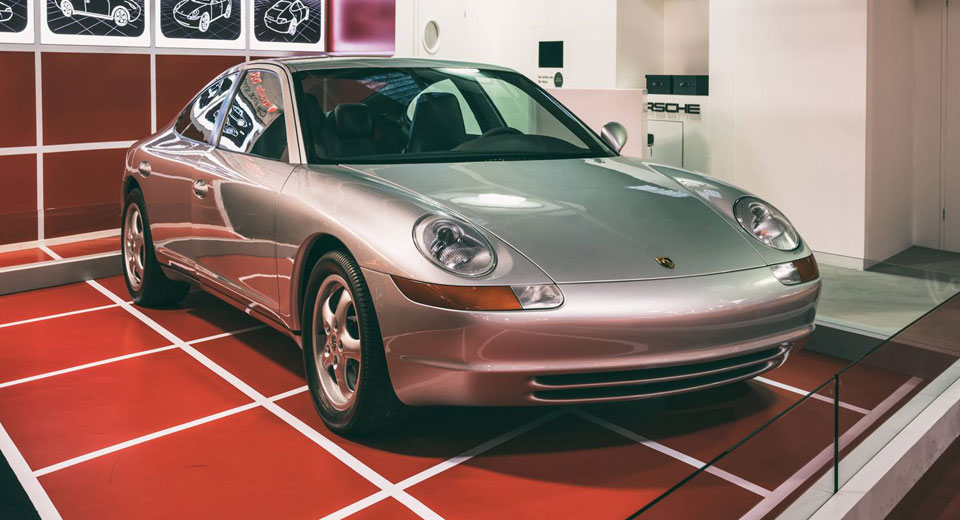

Overview
- Manufacturer: Porsche
- Production: 1988
- Designer: Harm Lagaay; Ulrich Bez

Body and chassis
- Class: Concept car
- Body style: 4-door sedan
- Layout: FR layout

Powertrain
- Engine: 3.6-4.2L V8
- Power output: 300–350 PS (220–260 kW; 300–350 hp)

Dimensions
- Wheelbase: 2,826 mm (111.3 in)
- Length: 4,500 mm (177.2 in)
- Width: 1,800 mm (70.9 in)
- Height: 1,600 mm (63.0 in)
- Curb weight: 1,572 kg (3,466 lb)

The Porsche 989 is a 4-door performance-oriented touring sedan developed by Porsche between 1988 and 1991. The car was never produced, as development was halted in late 1991, and cancelled shortly after in January 1992.

== History ==
Increased sales of Porsche's 928 model during the mid-1980s prompted executives to consider adding another large, sporty touring vehicle to their lineup, this time a 4-door that could serve as a more practical, but equally powerful and exciting alternative to the 928. Porsche engineer Dr. Ulrich Bez was put in charge of the project, and was told that the vehicle should be luxurious and comfortable, but also offer a sporting nature superior to that attained by the large saloon cars built by their competitors, such as Mercedes-Benz and BMW. The 968 was not the first four-door Porsche prototype, being preceded by a four-door 928 prototype earlier in the decade.

Bez designed a new front-engine, rear-drive platform with a wheelbase of 2,826 mm (111.3 in) and power coming from a new 80-degree, water cooled V8 engine with a power output of around 300 PS (220 kW; 300 hp). Some discrepancy has arisen as to the engine displacement, which is reported as being anywhere between 3.6 and 4.2 litres.

The prototype made from Bez's technical designs was styled by Harm Lagaay, a design which influenced later models and that shared a strong resemblance with the 911, despite the difference in engine placement. Styling cues found in the next generation 911 (993) saw their origins in this prototype. Specific design influences to later Porsche models include the control-arm rear suspension, 959-esque headlamps which would later be used on the 993, as well as the overall shape and tail-light design, which were adapted for the 996 generation 911.

After Ulrich Bez left Porsche in September 1991, the project lost momentum. The severe slump in 928 sales made executives re-think the idea's viability, and low overall profits during the 1989 to 1991 model years meant that it would be far more risky for the company to build than had been anticipated during development. Thus, in January 1992, development was halted completely. Although Porsche officials initially claimed that the only prototype was destroyed, it had actually been put into storage. A rear-view photograph of the prototype (silver color, 17 inch Cup II wheels, unregistered licence plate BB-PW 989) is published in the German classic car magazine Motor Klassik. Autoweek also reported the existence of the prototype. The vehicle would eventually become an exhibit at the Porsche Museum in Stuttgart.

As of 2019, it can be found at the Petersen Auto Museum in Los Angeles.

The Porsche Panamera, launched in 2009, is considered to be the spiritual successor to the 989 project.

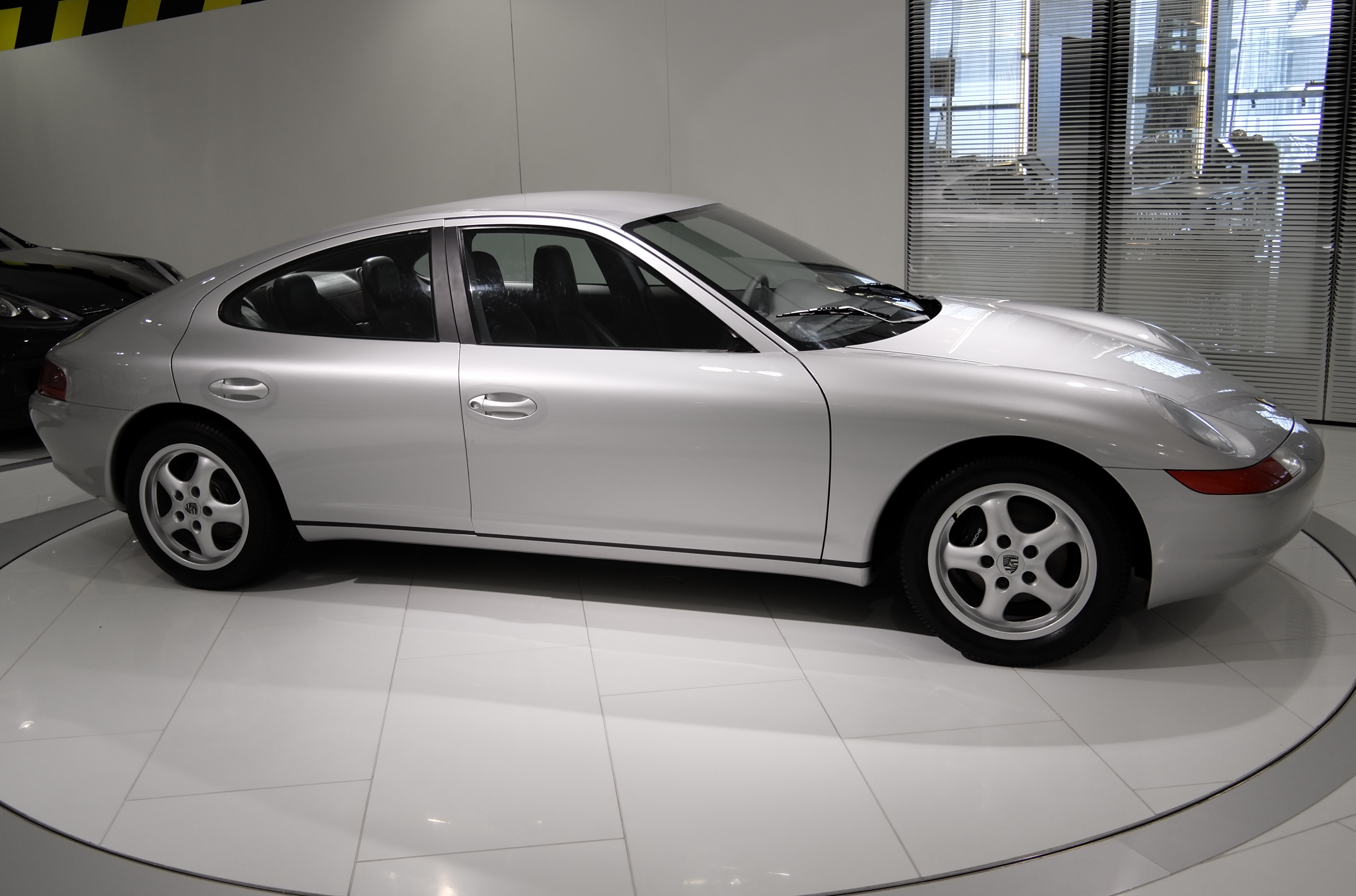
Porsche 989 Prototype side view

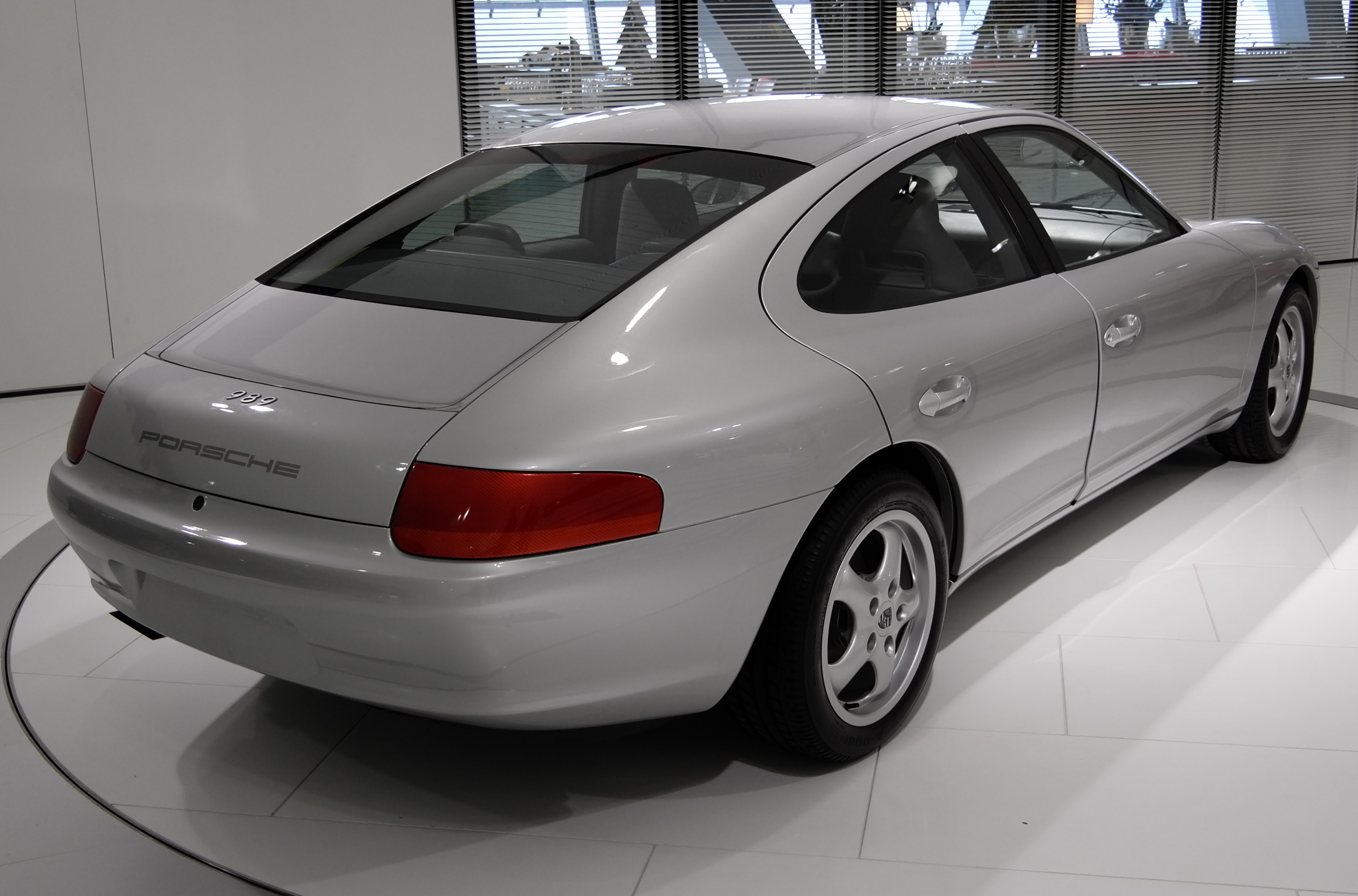
Porsche 989 Prototype behind/side
