= Porsche 911 GT1 =

Grand Touring race car manufactured by German automobile manufacturer Porsche

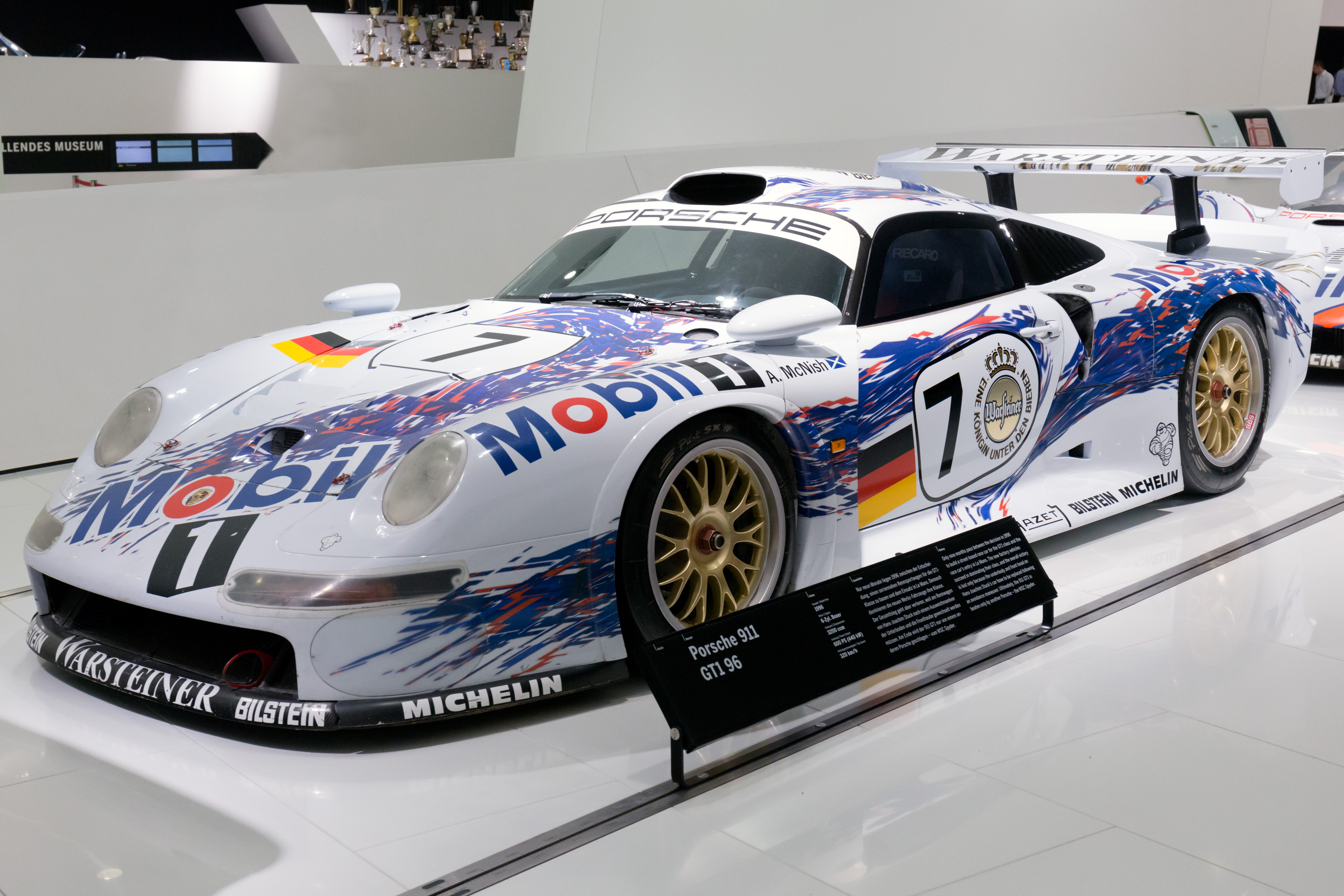
- Category: Le Mans GT1; FIA GT1
- Constructor: Porsche AG
- Designers: Norbert Singer; Tony Hatter
- Predecessor: Porsche 962; Porsche 911 GT2 Evo (GT1)
- Successor: Porsche RS Spyder

Technical specifications
- Chassis: steel tube frame
- Suspension (front): Double wishbone, adjustable dampers
- Suspension (rear): Double wishbone with push rod suspension, adjustable dampers
- Engine: 600 PS (441 kW; 592 hp) 3.2 L (200 cu in) water-cooled, Porsche 9R1 flat-6, twin-turbocharged, mid-engine
- Transmission: 6-speed sequential manual
- Weight: 1,050 kg (2,315 lb); 950 kg (2,094 lb)
- Fuel: Mobil 1
- Lubricants: Mobil 1
- Tyres: Michelin; Pirelli

Competition history
- Debut: 1996 24 Hours of Le Mans
- First win: 1996 BPR 4 Hours of Brands Hatch
- Last win: 2002 Canada GT Challenge Cup Mosport Round
- Last event: 2003 Grand American Champions Weekend
Races	Wins	Podiums	Poles	F/Laps
135	47	80	34	N/A
- Teams' Championships: 0
- Drivers' Championships: 0

The Porsche 911 GT1 is a car designed and developed by German automobile manufacturer Porsche AG to compete in the GT1 class of sportscar racing, which also required a street-legal version for homologation purposes. The limited-production street-legal version developed as a result was named the 911 GT1 Straßenversion (Street version).

== History ==
With the revival of international sportscar racing in the mid-1990s through the BPR Global GT Series (which then morphed into the FIA GT Championship) Porsche expressed interest in returning to top-level sportscar racing and went about developing its competitor for the GT1 category. Cars in this category were previously heavily modified versions of road cars, such as the McLaren F1 and the Ferrari F40. Porsche originally modified the 993 GT2 into an EVO version and homologated it as a GT1 car, but it proved to be uncompetitive against the other cars in its class.

=== 911 GT1 ===
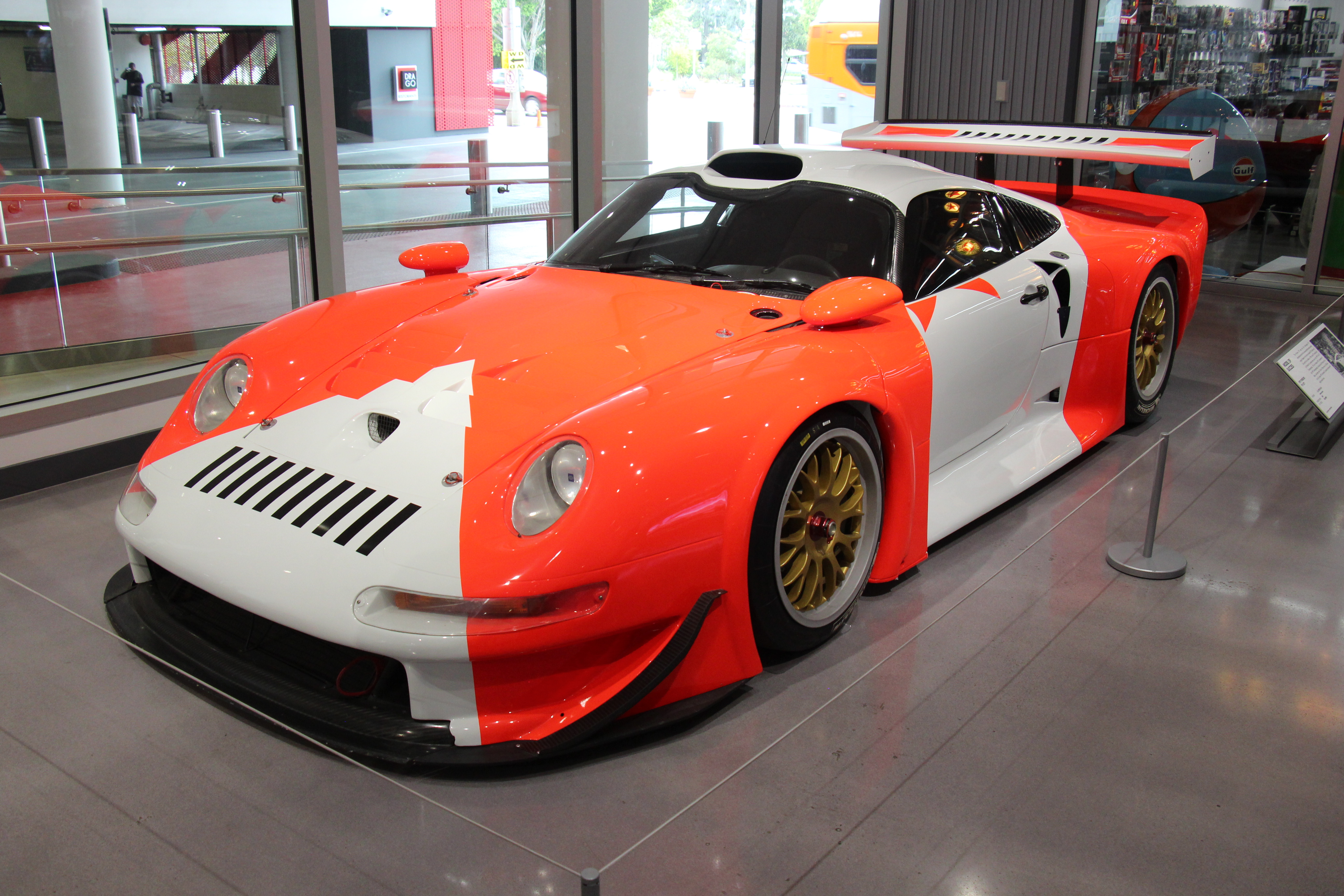
The GT1 had very little in common with the 911 (993), only sharing the front and tail light assemblies of the production 911.

Despite using the 911 moniker, the car barely had anything in common with the existing 911 at the time, only sharing the front and rear head- and taillights with the production sports car. However, its frontal chassis is based on the 993-generation 911, while the rear subframe was derived from the 962C Group C prototype along with its water-cooled, twin-turbocharged and intercooled, 4 valves per cylinder 3,164 cc (3.2 L) flat-six engine fuel fed by Bosch Motronic 5.2 fuel injection, which was longitudinally-mounted in a rear mid-engine, rear-wheel-drive layout, compared to the rear-engine, rear-wheel-drive layout of a conventional 911. The engine generated a power output of about 600 PS (441 kW; 592 hp). In comparison, the 993 generation 911 GT2, which was otherwise the company's highest-performance vehicle at the time, used an air-cooled engine with only two valves per cylinder.

The 911 GT1 made its debut in the BPR Global GT Series (the FIA championship's predecessor) at the Brands Hatch 4 hours, where Hans-Joachim Stuck and Thierry Boutsen won comfortably, although they were racing as an invitational entry and were thus ineligible for points. They followed up by winning at Spa, and Ralf Kelleners and Emmanuel Collard triumphed for the factory team at Zhuhai.

The 1996 911 GT1 clocked at a top speed of exactly 330 km/h (205 mph) on the legendary Mulsanne Straight in the practice sessions of the 1996 Le Mans 24 Hours Race.

=== 911 GT1 Evo ===
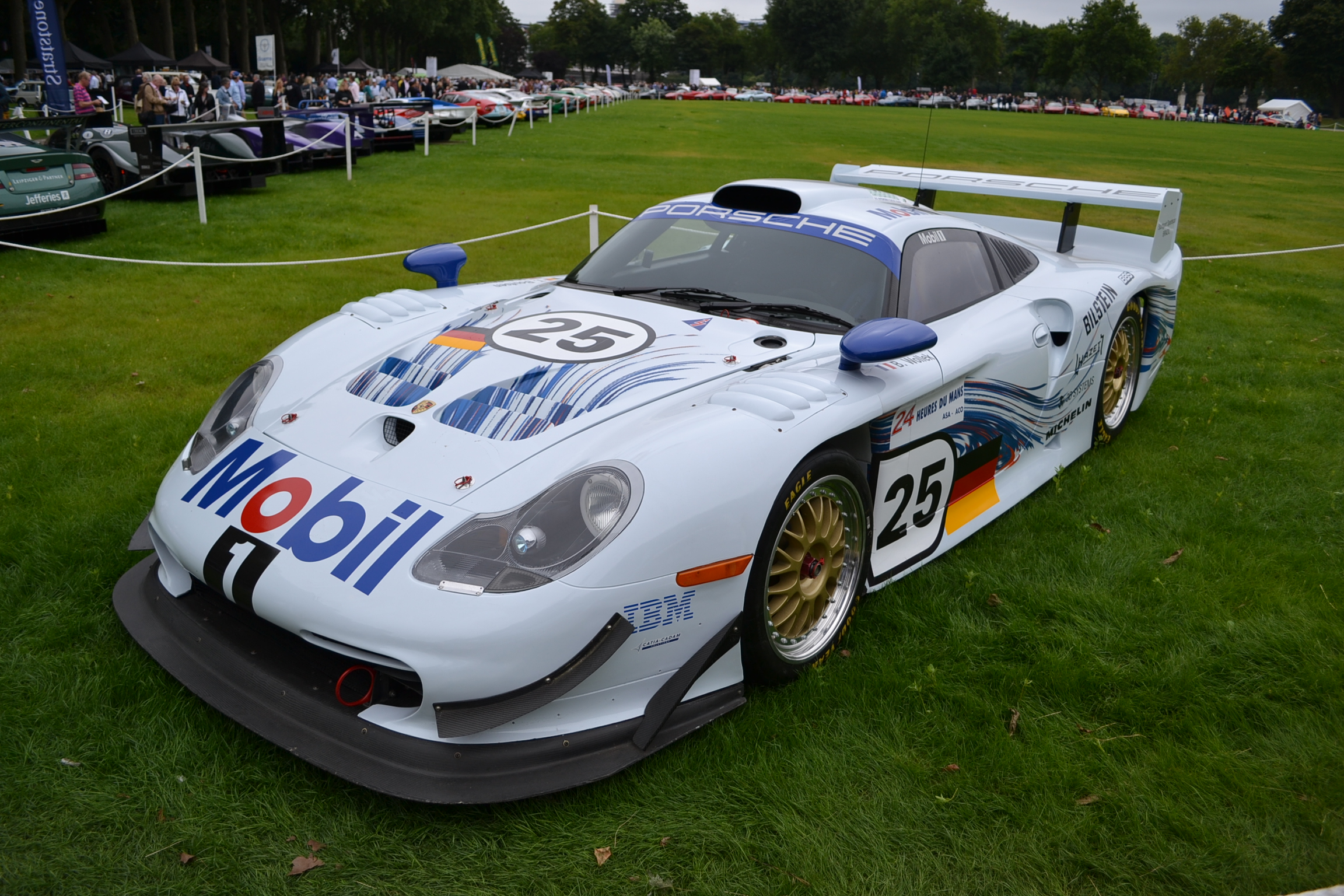
The 1997 variant of the GT1, called the 911 GT1 Evo, also previewed the 996 generation of the 911 while having improved aerodynamics

Towards the end of the 1996 season, Porsche made revisions to the 911 GT1 in preparation for the 1997 season. The front end of the car was revised including new bodywork which featured headlamps that previewed the all-new generation of the (996) Porsche 911 which would be unveiled in 1997. The revised car was known as the 911 GT1 Evo (or Evolution). The car had the same engine as the 1996 version, but its new aerodynamic elements allowed the 1997 version to be considerably faster than the 1996 version with improved acceleration, the top speed was still around 330 km/h (205 mph) on the La Sarthe Circuit (in the race, the GT1 Evo attained a top speed of 326 km/h). At Le Mans the works cars led the race but did not last the full distance; a privately entered 1996 specification GT1 managed 5th overall and third in the GT1 class.

=== 911 GT1-98 ===
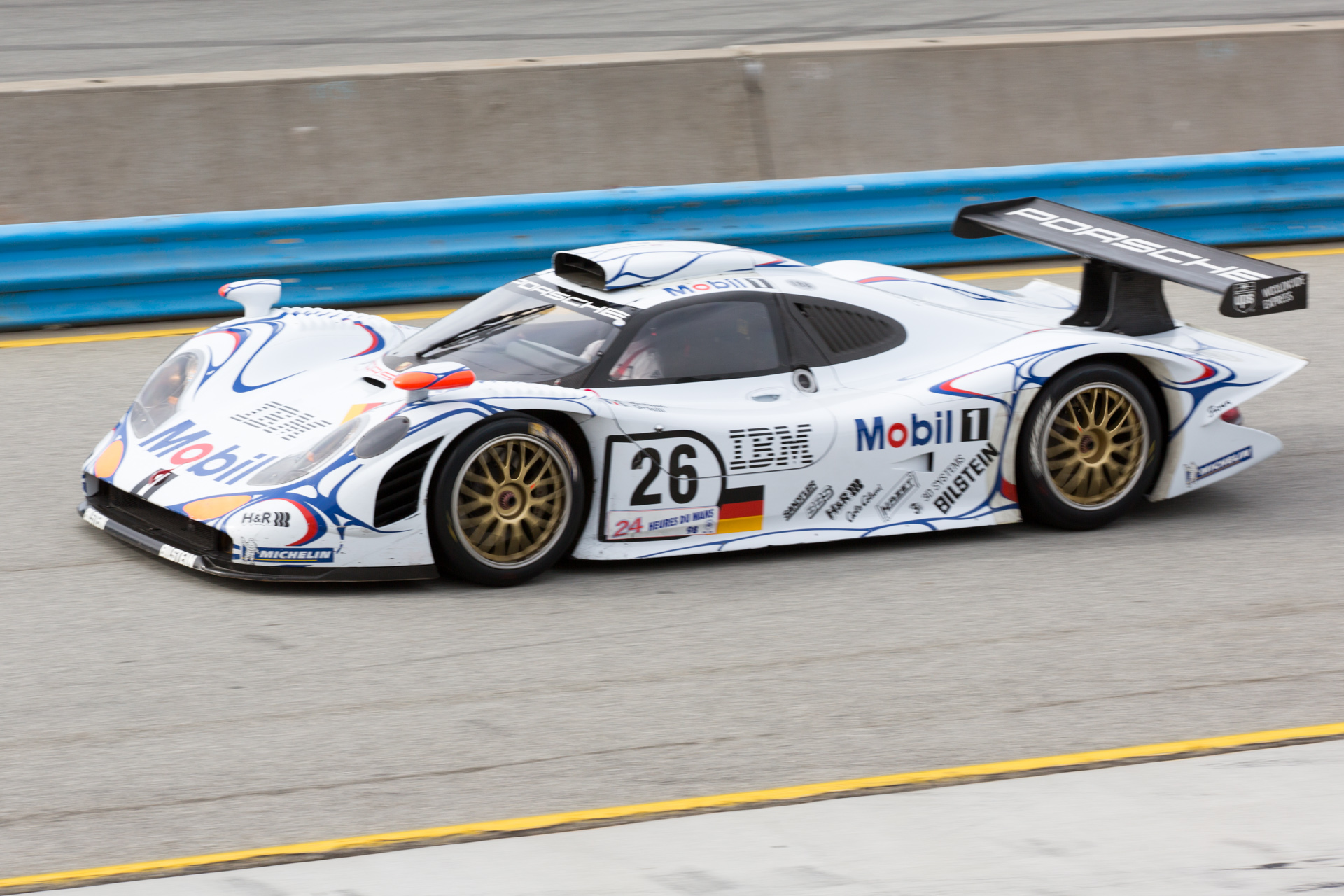
The 1998 variant of the GT1 bore little resemblance to the previous two versions and had construction and bodywork similar to a sports prototype.

For the 1998 season, Porsche developed an all-new car, the 911 GT1-98. Designed to match the also new Toyota GT-One and the Mercedes-Benz CLK LM, the 911 GT1-98 featured bodywork that bore more of a resemblance to traditional sports-prototypes than the previous two models. A new sequential gearbox was installed to reduce shift time. Engine control also moved to a TAG Electronic Systems TAG 3.8 ECU. As per the regulations, a street-legal version of the 911 GT1-98 was made but it is believed that only one variant was produced which was still sufficient to satisfy the new regulations.

During the 1998 FIA International GT season, the 911 GT1-98 struggled to match the pace of the Mercedes, which also was improved, with the main reason being down to the air-restrictor rules which were regarded as unfavourable to the turbocharged engine (the Mercedes had a naturally aspirated V8 engine). The Michelin tyres of the factory team and especially the Pirelli of the private Zakspeed team were also considered inferior to the Bridgestone tyres of the Mercedes.

At the 1998 Le Mans, however, it was a different story. The BMW V12 LM retired with wheel bearing trouble, and the Mercedes CLK-LM cars had oil pump troubles in the new V8 engines that replaced the former V12. The Toyota GT-One, which was considered to be the fastest car, also suffered gearbox reliability problems.

The 911 GT1-98, despite being slower than the Toyota or the Mercedes, fulfilled Porsche's slim hopes, taking both first and second place overall thanks to reliability, giving Porsche its record-breaking 16th overall win at Le Mans, more than any other manufacturer in history.

At the Petit Le Mans race in Road Atlanta, the 911 GT1-98 of Yannick Dalmas made a spectacular backward flip and landed rear first before hitting the side barriers, similar to what would later happen to a BMW V12 LMR at the same race in 2000, and the Mercedes-Benz CLR at Le Mans in 1999.

=== 1999 ===
With Mercedes dominating FIA GT1 in 1998, all other entries including Porsche withdrew for the 1999 season. The GT1 class was cancelled, and the FIA GT Championship was contested with GT2 cars. Having won the 1998 24 Hours of Le Mans, Porsche could have entered at Le Mans, but they opted not to try to defend their 1998 victory against the new entrants from other manufacturers.

Champion Racing brought a 911 GT1 Evo to America to race in the American Le Mans Series, but was only allowed to do so as an LMP (Le Mans Prototype) class entry, where it proved uncompetitive against actual prototypes such as the BMW V12 LMR.

=== Gunnar G-99 ===
Following Champion's purchase of a 911 GT1 Evo for 1999, Gunnar Racing offered a custom race car to the team with intentions to race in 2000. The car, known as the Gunnar G-99, was a custom-built 911 GT1 with an open cockpit. The chassis was made from scratch yet remained nearly identical to the 911 GT1 mechanically, even using the bulk of the body parts. A large rollbar was put over the open cockpit to help protect the driver. A 3.6-litre flat-6, from a Porsche 911 GT3, was used in place of the standard 911 GT1 unit.

However, Champion would instead turn to buy a Lola B2K/10, so the Gunnar G-99 was temporarily abandoned. The car would resurface in the Rolex Sports Car Series in 2002, yet would not be allowed to race until it had a roof again. Therefore, Gunnar Racing rebuilt the car with a near-identical GT1 roof, and briefly competed in 2003. The car would take a best finish of second in class twice before being retired due to lack of funding and due to the ban on SRP cars in favour of Daytona Prototypes.

== Street-legal version ==
Porsche 911 GT1 Straßenversion
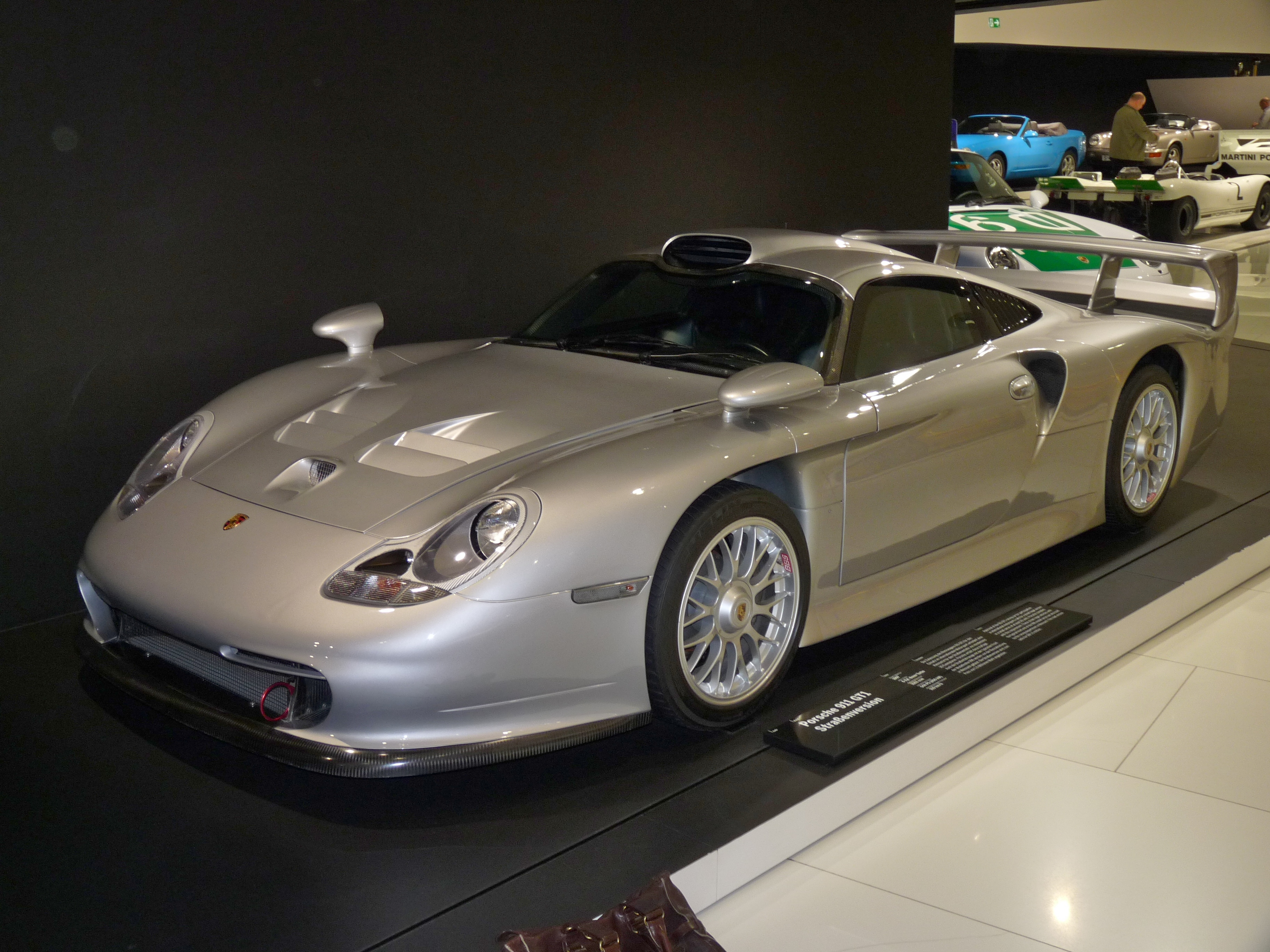

Overview
- Manufacturer: Porsche
- Production: 1996–1999; (25 produced)
- Assembly: Stuttgart, Germany
- Designer: Tony Hatter

Body and chassis
- Class: Sports car (S)
- Body style: 2-door coupé
- Layout: Rear mid-engine, rear-wheel-drive
- Related: Porsche 962; Porsche 993; Porsche 996; Porsche 986

Powertrain
- Engine: 193.1 cu in (3,164 cc), twin-turbocharged, Porsche M96/80 flat-6,
- Power output: 400 kW (544 PS; 536 hp); 600 N⋅m (443 lb⋅ft) of torque
- Transmission: 6-speed manual

Dimensions
- Length: 4,890 mm (192.5 in)
- Width: 1,990 mm (78.3 in)
- Height: 1,140 mm (44.9 in)
- Curb weight: 1,150 kg (2,535 lb)

Regulations for the GT1 category stipulated that to be eligible, a total of 25 cars must be built for road use.

Porsche developed two prototype cars, both fully road-legal versions. The first was delivered in early 1996 to the German Federal Ministry of Transport, Building, and Urban Development for compliance testing, which it passed. The second prototype vehicle is in the hands of a Bahrain-based private car collector Khalid Abdul Rahim. These two cars feature 993 style front headlights.

The production car - dubbed "911 GT1 Straßenversion" - was a run of approximately 20 units which were built in 1997 and featured 996 style front headlights. The majority of the production model was finished in Arctic Silver or Fern White, but three cars were finished in unique colours: Polar Silver, Indian Red, and Pastel Yellow.

A single car - the 911 GT1-98 Straßenversion - was built in 1998 to homologate the all-new racing version under the new FIA regulations.

The engine had to be slightly de-tuned to meet European emissions laws, although its 400 kW (544 PS; 536 hp) at 7,000 rpm and 600 N⋅m (443 lb⋅ft) of torque at 4,250 rpm proved to be more than adequate; the car could accelerate to 100 km/h (62 mph) from a standstill in 3.9 seconds on its way to a top speed of 308 km/h (191 mph).

Auto, Motor und Sport tested the street-legal version in 1997 with the following results:

- 0-50 km/h (31.1 mph) : 2.1 seconds
- 0-100 km/h (62.1 mph) : 3.9 seconds
- 0-130 km/h (80.8 mph) : 5.4 seconds
- 0-160 km/h (99.4 mph) : 7.1 seconds
- 0-180 km/h (111.8 mph) : 8.8 seconds
- 0-200 km/h (124.3 mph) : 10.5 seconds
- 0-250 km/h (155.3 mph) : 17.4 seconds
- 0-400 m (1/4 mi): 11.6 seconds
- 0-1 km (0.62 mi): 20.7 seconds
- Top speed: 308 km/h (191.4 mph)
- Braking from 100 km/h (62.1 mph): 36 m (118 ft)
- Braking from 200 km/h (124.3 mph): 130.8 m (429 ft)

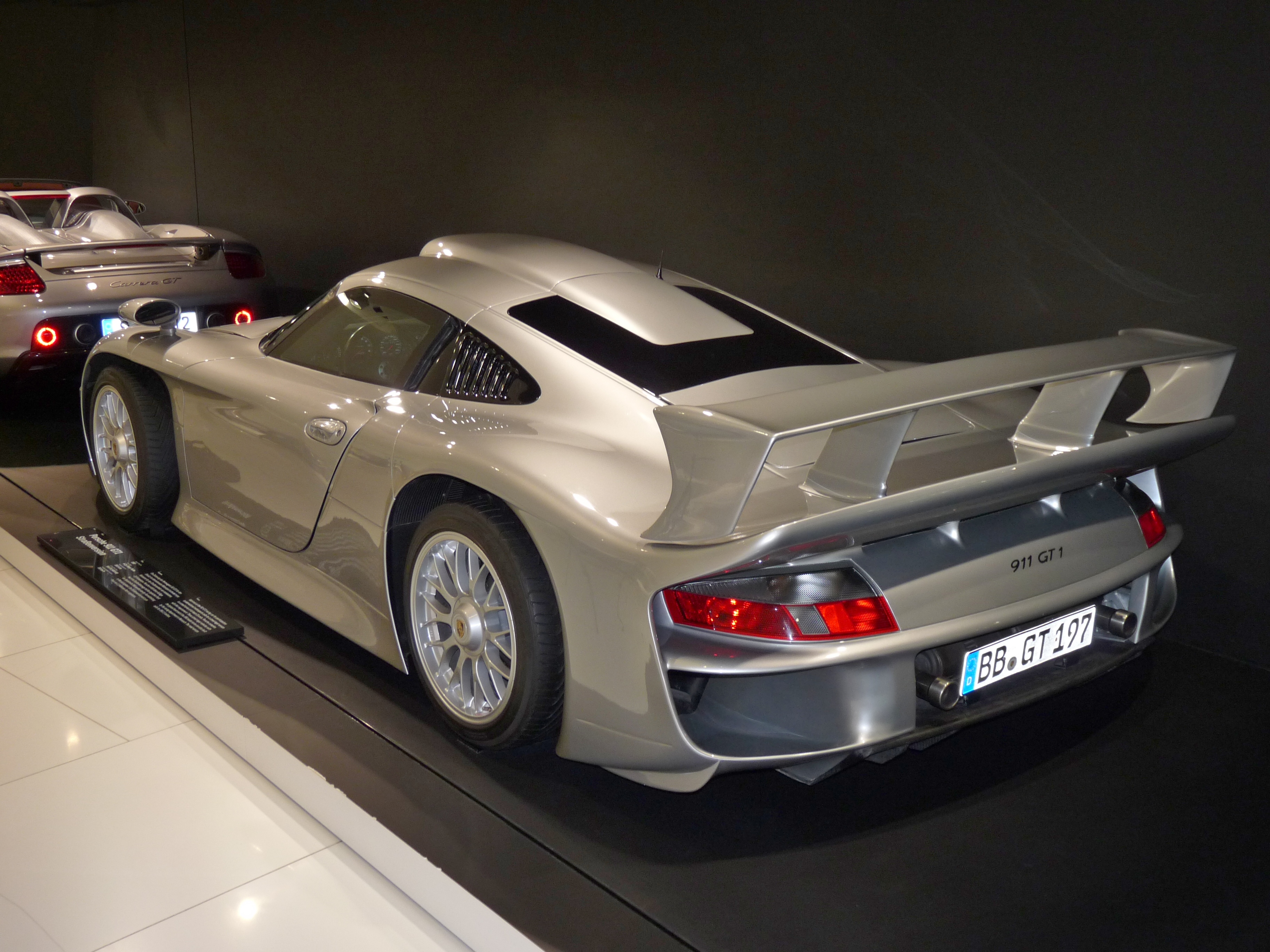
1997 911 GT1 (rear view)

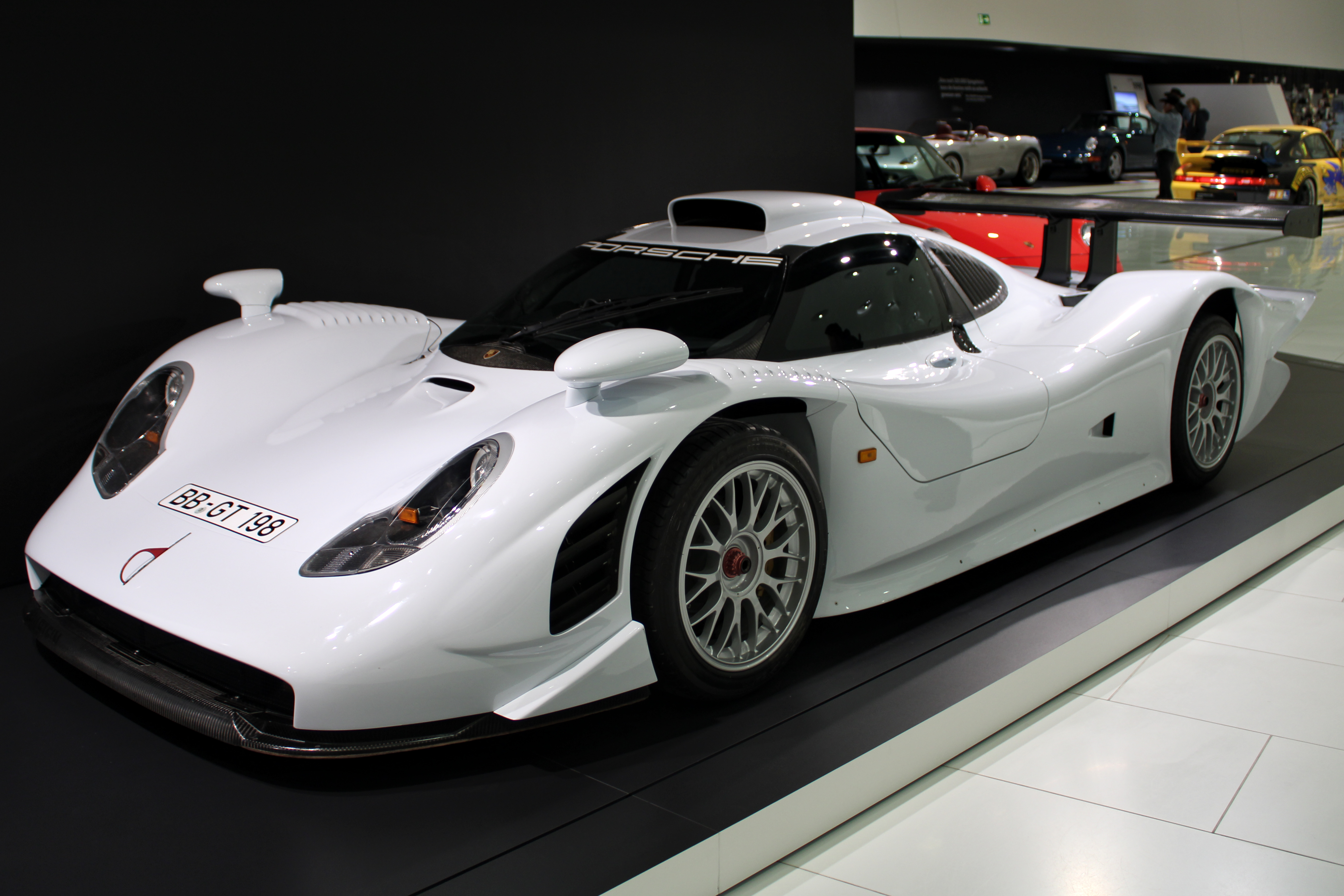
Porsche 911 GT1-98 (Straßen version)

== 24 Hours of Le Mans results ==
Year	Team	Drivers	Car #	Class	Laps	Pos.	Class Pos.
1996	(Germany) Porsche AG	(Germany) Hans-Joachim Stuck (Belgium) Thierry Boutsen (France) Bob Wollek	25	GT1	353	2nd	1st
1996	(Germany) Porsche AG	(Austria) Karl Wendlinger (France) Yannick Dalmas (Canada) Scott Goodyear	26	GT1	341	3rd	2nd
1997	(Italy) BMS Scuderia Italia	(Italy) Pierluigi Martini (Italy) Christian Pescatori (Brazil) Antonio de Azevedo Herrmann	27	GT1	317	8th	4th
1997	(Germany) Konrad Motorsport	(Austria) Franz Konrad (Italy) Mauro Baldi (United Kingdom) Robert Nearn	28	GT1	138	DNF	DNF
1997	(France) JB Racing	(France) Alain Ferté (Germany) Jürgen von Gartzen (France) Olivier Thévenin	29	GT1	236	DNF	DNF
1997	(Germany) Kremer Racing	(France) Christophe Bouchut (United States) Andy Evans (Belgium) Bertrand Gachot	30	GT1	207	DNF	DNF
1997	(Germany) Roock Racing Team	(United Kingdom) Allan McNish (Austria) Karl Wendlinger (Monaco) Stéphane Ortelli	32	GT1	8	DNF	DNF
1997	(Germany) Schübel Rennsport (private entrant)	(Portugal) Pedro Lamy (Germany) Armin Hahne (France) Patrice Goueslard	33	GT1	331	5th	3rd
1998	(Germany) Porsche AG	(France) Bob Wollek (Germany) Jörg Müller (Germany) Uwe Alzen	25	GT1	350	2nd	2nd
1998	(Germany) Porsche AG	(United Kingdom) Allan McNish (Monaco) Stéphane Ortelli (France) Laurent Aiello	26	GT1	351	1st	1st

== Bibliography ==
- Upietz, Ulrich (1998). Porsche 911 GT1: Der Erfolgstyp '98. Le Mans Sieger (in English and German). Duisburg: Gruppe C Motorsport Verlag. ISBN 978-3-928-54020-9.
- Bogner, Stefan; Hientzsch, Heike (2024). Porsche 911 GT1 (in English and German). Bielefeld: Delius Klasing Verlag. ISBN 978-3-667-13270-3.
