= Harm Lagaay =

Dutch automobile designer

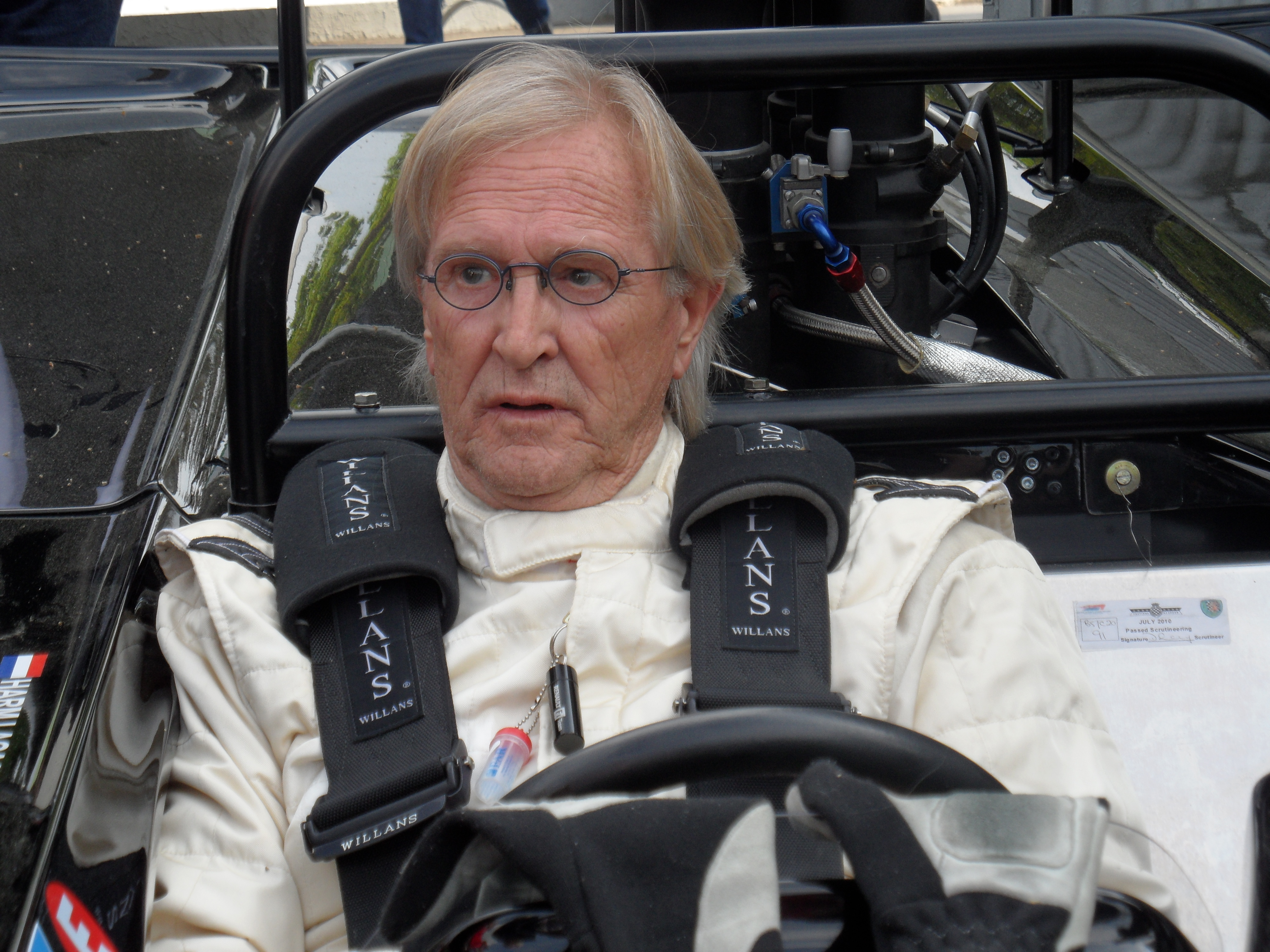

Personal details
- Born: Harm Lagaaij; 28 December 1946 (age 79) Hague
- Occupation: Dutch automobile designer

Harm Lagaaij (anglicized as Harm Lagaay; born 28 December 1946) is a Dutch automobile designer.

== Biography ==
He was educated in the Netherlands where he completed the studies at the IVA and went to work for the Dutch company Olyslager in Soest.

In the late 1960s, Lagaay went to work for Simca, then from 1971 for Porsche. He worked in the team designing the Porsche 911 and designed the Porsche 924. From 1977, Lagaay worked as Chief of Design for Ford in Cologne, and moved to BMW in 1985.

Lagaay designed the BMW Z1 sports car, with electric doors that retract vertically into the sills of the car and removable plastic body panels.

He returned to Porsche in 1989 as head of the "Style Porsche" department in Weissach. As well as the Porsches of the period – the 968, 989 (the stillborn four door Porsche), 993 (the 1993-1997 generation of the 911 for which Englishman Tony Hatter is also credited), Boxster, 996 (the all-new 911 of 1997), Cayenne, Carrera GT – he also oversaw the company's work for external clients and opening of a studio in California.

He retired from Porsche in July 2004 and has been followed by Michael Mauer of Germany.

== See also ==
- Adrian van Hooydonk
- Tony Hatter
