= Tony Hatter =

British automobile designer

Anthony Robert Hatter (born 13 December 1954) is a British automobile designer originally from Yorkshire, United Kingdom.

== Biography ==
He studied Transport Design with first design job at Opel, before moving to Porsche's style department in 1986. Hatter worked along with his up-and-coming peers Harm Lagaay and Freeman Thomas to put a mark on several iterations of Porsche's sports car design. Eventually becoming part of Porsche's executive team as Design Manager, he is credited with designing the Porsche 993 (along with Harm Lagaay), the third generation Porsche Cayman (981 Cayman), as well as working on numerous cars including the Porsche 911 GT1. He was instrumental on adapting both the exterior and interior designs of the Porsche Carrera GT concept car, which was originally a modified Porsche 986 frame, into the production trim guise. Additionally, he served as Design Manager for RSR version of the Porsche 918 and more recently, designed the 50th Anniversary and GT3 Touring editions of the Porsche 991.
