= Saleen XP8 =

American SUV model (1998–2001)

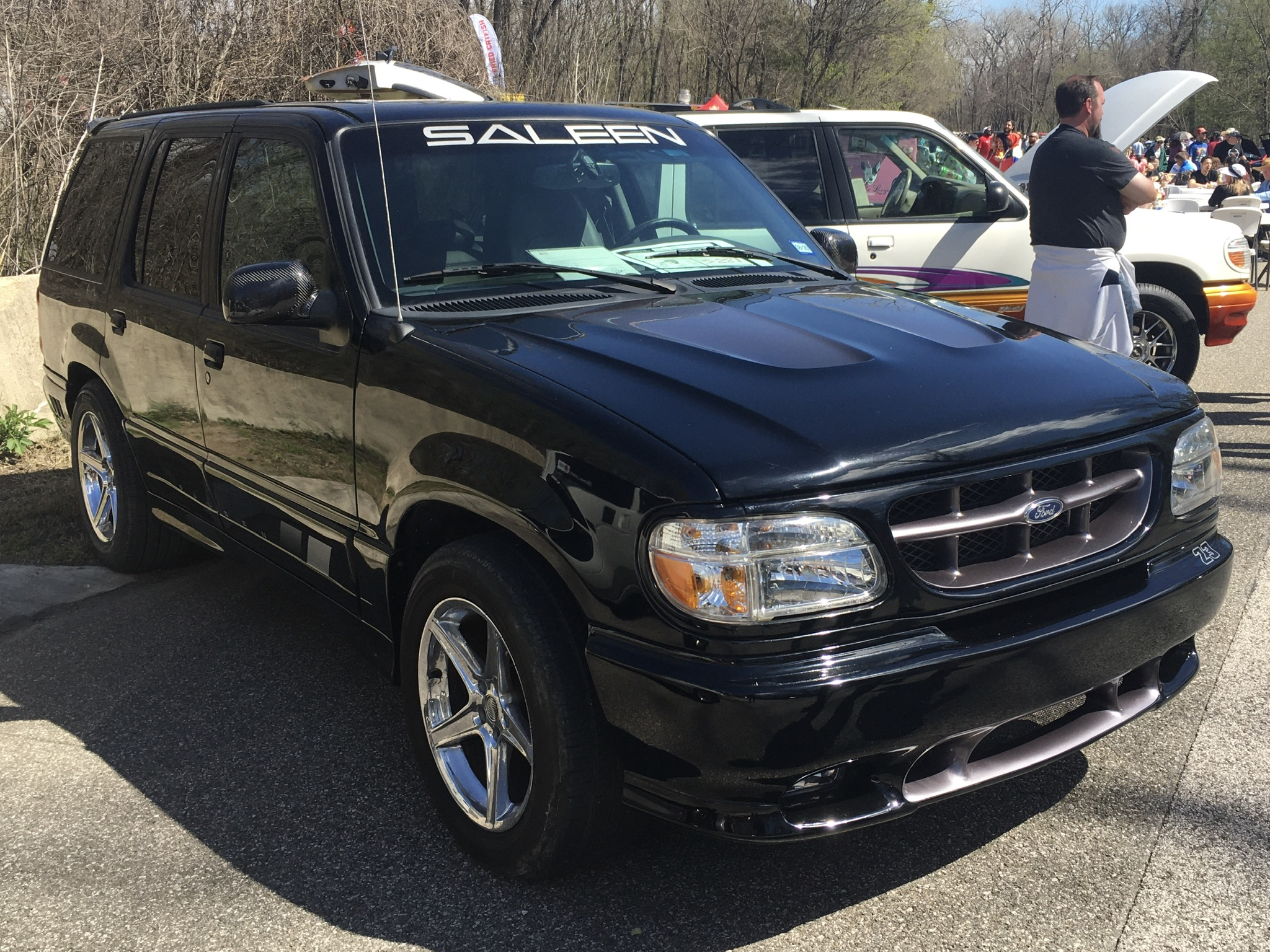
1999 Saleen XP8 #23 with AWD and the Saleen 5.0L supercharged V8 engine

The Saleen XP8 is a performance sport utility vehicle based on the Ford Explorer built by Saleen from 1998 to 2001. There were three prototype models, based on the 1997 Explorer XLT, which when viewed closely, has distinct characteristics apart from the production models (rear hatch design, taillights, and integrated license plate into the rear bumper). The Saleen XP8 comes in two wheel drive, or all wheel drive four-door configurations, packing either a 5.0-liter V-8, or a Saleen-developed supercharged 5.0-liter/286-horsepower V-8.

A six-cylinder version, the Saleen XP6, was also made in very limited quantities in 1998.

== Production quantities ==
There were approximately 125 Saleen XP8's created, although this number is widely disputed and to an extent, impossible to verify as Saleen has extremely limited records of this low production model. It has been said that approximately the first 20 XP8's were reserved for Saleen employees and executives, thus decreasing the available selection to the public even more.

== Specifications ==
Saleen lowered the Explorer about 2 inches, for both improved handling and appearance. Springs and shocks were replaced with the company's Racecraft components, and wheels upgraded to Saleen's own 18-inch (460 mm) genuine magnesium wheels wrapped by Pirelli 255/55SR18 Scorpion S/T radials.

The exterior appearance package was designed by Phil Frank and includes special front and rear fascia, side skirts, door cladding, roof-mounted rear wing, and carbon fiber trim. The cabin is treated to either a real wood or carbon fiber appearance package, depending upon color choice, as well as Saleen gauge faces and floor mats. Additionally, Saleen/RECARO leather seating, offering 10-way power adjustment up front and hip-hugging support, was offered as an option for $3950.

=== Engine ===
Bore & Stroke: 4in x 3in
Displacement: 5.0L / 302cid
Compression Ratio: 8.5:1

Non Supercharged:
Power: 222 hp (166 kW) at 4,200 rpm
Torque: 298 lb⋅ft (404 N⋅m) at 3,000 rpm

Supercharged:

Power: 286 hp (213 kW)
Torque: 333 lb⋅ft (451 N⋅m)

0-60 mph (97 km/h): 7.4 seconds (Motor Trend)
1/4 mile: 15.7 seconds at 88.1 mph (141.8 km/h) (Motor Trend)

=== Drivetrain ===
Transmission: 4-speed automatic

=== Brakes ===
ABS: Three channel, four-sensor system
Disc Brakes: Front & Rear
Front: 13in vented disc four piston caliper (optional)
These front disc brakes were eventually recalled and replaced with stock Explorer calipers, again due to lack of structural integrity.=

=== Additional options ===
- Carbon Fiber hood
- Premium Sound System
- Integrated LCD
- Saleen Recaro Leather interior

== Saleen Explorer pricing ==
All prices are in USD
Saleen Explorer 5.0L 2WD base price: $37,990.00
Saleen Explorer 5.0L AWD base price: $45,990

Saleen/Recaro Leather Upgrade: $3,950.00
Saleen 13" Brake System (N/A on 2WD): $2,438.00 (Later recalled & replaced with stock Explorer brakes)
Saleen Lightweight Hood: $1,600.00
Chrome Alloy Wheels: $935.00

Enclosed Transport to Dealer: $1500.00

== Variation in models ==
Saleen XP8's varied dramatically in appearance and options as a result of Saleen farming the production of the XP8's (with the exception of only a few) to California bodyshops and Ford dealers. Many of the options available, such as the carbon fiber composite hood, Saleen supercharger, and carbon fiber accents were installed outside of the Saleen Inc. compound.

== Records ==
The Saleen Book, an official book produced by Saleen detailing the history and production numbers of Saleen vehicles past and present, noticeably neglected to cover and feature the XP8. Only in the owner registry listed in the book (compiled information of the original owner of each Saleen vehicle) did it mention a few select XP8's.

As such, the Saleen Explorer XP6/XP8 Owner Registry Database was created on ExplorerX, an active Ford Explorer enthusiast website to maintain records. Although unofficial, it remains the only and most active list dedicated to Saleen XP6 and XP8 vehicles. An active XP6 and XP8 community resides there.
