= Saleen XP6 =

The Saleen XP6 is a sport utility vehicle based on the Ford Explorer, created by Saleen in 1998. It is the six-cylinder sibling to the Saleen XP8, which remains identical in appearance and upgrades to the XP6 except for an eight-cylinder engine, with or without a supercharger. The Saleen XP6 comes in two- or four-wheel-drive four-door configurations, packing only a SOHC 4.0-liter V-6 engine configuration. No supercharger was available at the time of production.

== Production quantities ==
The XP6 remains rarer than its sibling, the Saleen XP8, because it was entirely a "mistake." Saleen had ordered a batch of Explorers in 1998 for transformation into XP8s, however, some six cylinder Explorer XLT's were thrown into the batch. Rather than send the Explorers back for an exchange, which would result in lost time and money for Saleen, they decided to outfit the six cylinder Explorer XLT's instead with the XP8 package. Thus, the XP6 was born.

As a result of this "mistake", the production numbers for the XP6 are extremely low. It is estimated that a maximum of ten are in existence. Six have been confirmed through the ExplorerX Saleen XP6/XP8 Owner Registry Database.

== Specifications ==
Saleen lowered the Explorer about 2 inches, for both improved handling and appearance. Springs and shocks were swapped for the company's Racecraft components, and the wheels were upgraded to Saleen's own 18-inch magnesium wheels with Pirelli 255/55SR18 Scorpion S/T radial tires.

The exterior appearance package includes special front and rear fascia, side skirts, door cladding, roof-mounted rear wing, and carbon fiber trim. The cabin is treated to either a real wood or carbon fiber appearance package, depending upon color choice, as well as Saleen gauge faces and floor mats. Additionally, Saleen/RECARO leather seating ($3950), offering 10-way power adjustment up front, was offered as an option.

Engine
Bore & Stroke: 3.95in x 3.32in
Displacement: 4.0L / 245cid
Compression ratio: 9.7:1
Horsepower: 205 hp at 5,000 rpm
Torque: 250 lb/ft at 3,000 rpm

Drive Train
Transmission: 5-speed automatic

Brakes
ABS: Three channel, four sensor system
Disc Brakes: Front & Rear
Front: 13in vented disc four piston caliper (optional)
These front disc brakes were eventually recalled and replaced with stock Explorer calipers, again due to lack of structural integrity.

Additional Options

- Carbon Fiber hood
- Premium Sound System
- Integrated LCD
- Saleen Recaro leather interior

== Variation in models ==
Like the XP8, each Saleen XP6 may vary dramatically in appearance and options, as a result of Saleen farming the production of the XP6's to California bodyshops and Ford dealers. Many of the options available in Saleen XP6's, such as the carbon fiber composite hood and carbon fiber accents were installed outside of the Saleen Inc. compound.

Therefore, many XP6's vary significantly with options installed.

There is no XP6 with a supercharger option, as there was no supercharger kit available to V6 Explorers at the time.

== Records ==
The Saleen Book, an official book produced by Saleen detailing the history and production numbers of Saleen vehicles past and present, noticeably neglected to cover and feature the XP6 and XP8.

As such, the Saleen Explorer XP6/XP8 Owner Registry Database was created on ExplorerX, an active Ford Explorer enthusiast website to maintain records. Although unofficial, it remains the only and most active list dedicated to Saleen XP6 and XP8 vehicles. An active XP6 and XP8 community resides there.
