= 1998 FIA GT Hockenheim 500 km =

Race Car Championship that took place in Germany

Layout of the Hockenheimring GP Circuit (1994–2001)

The 1998 FIA GT Hockenheim 500 km was the third round the 1998 FIA GT Championship season. It took place at the Hockenheimring, Germany, on June 28, 1998.

== Official results ==
Class winners are in bold. Cars failing to complete 70% of winner's distance are marked as Not Classified (NC).

Pos	Class	No	Team	Drivers	Chassis	Tyre	Laps
Pos	Class	No	Team	Drivers	Engine	Tyre	Laps
1	**GT1**	**1**	**(Germany) AMG Mercedes**	**(Germany) Bernd Schneider (Australia) Mark Webber**	**Mercedes-Benz CLK LM**	**B**	**74**
1	**GT1**	**1**	**(Germany) AMG Mercedes**	**(Germany) Bernd Schneider (Australia) Mark Webber**	**Mercedes-Benz M119 6.0L V8**	**B**	**74**
2	GT1	2	(Germany) AMG Mercedes	(Germany) Klaus Ludwig (Brazil) Ricardo Zonta	Mercedes-Benz CLK LM	**B**	74
2	GT1	2	(Germany) AMG Mercedes	(Germany) Klaus Ludwig (Brazil) Ricardo Zonta	Mercedes-Benz M119 6.0L V8	**B**	74
3	GT1	3	(France) DAMS	(France) Éric Bernard (Australia) David Brabham	Panoz GTR-1	**MI**	73
3	GT1	3	(France) DAMS	(France) Éric Bernard (Australia) David Brabham	Ford (Roush) 6.0L V8	**MI**	73
4	GT1	12	(Germany) Team Persson Motorsport	(Germany) Marcel Tiemann (France) Jean-Marc Gounon	Mercedes-Benz CLK GTR	**B**	73
4	GT1	12	(Germany) Team Persson Motorsport	(Germany) Marcel Tiemann (France) Jean-Marc Gounon	Mercedes-Benz M120 6.0L V12	**B**	73
5	GT1	15	(United Kingdom) Davidoff Classic (United Kingdom) GTC Competition	(United Kingdom) Geoff Lees (Germany) Thomas Bscher	McLaren F1 GTR	**G**	72
5	GT1	15	(United Kingdom) Davidoff Classic (United Kingdom) GTC Competition	(United Kingdom) Geoff Lees (Germany) Thomas Bscher	BMW S70 6.0L V12	**G**	72
6	GT1	7	(Germany) Porsche AG	(France) Yannick Dalmas (United Kingdom) Allan McNish	Porsche 911 GT1-98	**MI**	72
6	GT1	7	(Germany) Porsche AG	(France) Yannick Dalmas (United Kingdom) Allan McNish	Porsche 3.2L Turbo Flat-6	**MI**	72
7	GT1	6	(Germany) Zakspeed Racing	(Germany) Michael Bartels (Germany) Armin Hahne	Porsche 911 GT1-98	**P**	72
7	GT1	6	(Germany) Zakspeed Racing	(Germany) Michael Bartels (Germany) Armin Hahne	Porsche 3.2L Turbo Flat-6	**P**	72
8	**GT2**	**51**	**(France) Viper Team Oreca**	**(Portugal) Pedro Lamy (Monaco) Olivier Beretta**	**Chrysler Viper GTS-R**	**MI**	**69**
8	**GT2**	**51**	**(France) Viper Team Oreca**	**(Portugal) Pedro Lamy (Monaco) Olivier Beretta**	**Chrysler 8.0L V10**	**MI**	**69**
9	GT2	52	(France) Viper Team Oreca	(Austria) Karl Wendlinger (United States) David Donohue	Chrysler Viper GTS-R	**MI**	68
9	GT2	52	(France) Viper Team Oreca	(Austria) Karl Wendlinger (United States) David Donohue	Chrysler 8.0L V10	**MI**	68
10	GT1	8	(Germany) Porsche AG	(Germany) Jörg Müller (Germany) Uwe Alzen	Porsche 911 GT1-98	**MI**	67
10	GT1	8	(Germany) Porsche AG	(Germany) Jörg Müller (Germany) Uwe Alzen	Porsche 3.2L Turbo Flat-6	**MI**	67
11	GT2	57	(Germany) Roock Racing	(Switzerland) Bruno Eichmann (Germany) Sascha Maassen	Porsche 911 GT2	**Y**	67
11	GT2	57	(Germany) Roock Racing	(Switzerland) Bruno Eichmann (Germany) Sascha Maassen	Porsche 3.6L Turbo Flat-6	**Y**	67
12	GT2	56	(Germany) Roock Racing	(France) Stéphane Ortelli (Germany) Claudia Hürtgen	Porsche 911 GT2	**Y**	67
12	GT2	56	(Germany) Roock Racing	(France) Stéphane Ortelli (Germany) Claudia Hürtgen	Porsche 3.6L Turbo Flat-6	**Y**	67
13	GT2	60	(Switzerland) Elf Haberthur Racing	(Belgium) Michel Neugarten (Germany) Gerd Ruch (Italy) Marco Spinelli	Porsche 911 GT2	**G**	66
13	GT2	60	(Switzerland) Elf Haberthur Racing	(Belgium) Michel Neugarten (Germany) Gerd Ruch (Italy) Marco Spinelli	Porsche 3.6L Turbo Flat-6	**G**	66
14	GT2	62	(Switzerland) Stadler Motorsport	(Switzerland) Uwe Sick (Germany) Axel Röhr	Porsche 911 GT2	**P**	65
14	GT2	62	(Switzerland) Stadler Motorsport	(Switzerland) Uwe Sick (Germany) Axel Röhr	Porsche 3.6L Turbo Flat-6	**P**	65
15	GT2	65	(Germany) Konrad Motorsport	(Switzerland) Toni Seiler (United Kingdom) Martin Stretton	Porsche 911 GT2	**D**	64
15	GT2	65	(Germany) Konrad Motorsport	(Switzerland) Toni Seiler (United Kingdom) Martin Stretton	Porsche 3.6L Turbo Flat-6	**D**	64
16	GT2	96	(Germany) Proton Competition	(Austria) Horst Felbermayr, Sr. (Austria) Horst Felbermayr, Jr.	Porsche 911 GT2	**P**	64
16	GT2	96	(Germany) Proton Competition	(Austria) Horst Felbermayr, Sr. (Austria) Horst Felbermayr, Jr.	Porsche 3.6L Turbo Flat-6	**P**	64
17	GT2	61	(Switzerland) Elf Haberthur Racing	(France) David Velay (France) Eric Graham (France) David Smadja	Porsche 911 GT2	**G**	63
17	GT2	61	(Switzerland) Elf Haberthur Racing	(France) David Velay (France) Eric Graham (France) David Smadja	Porsche 3.6L Turbo Flat-6	**G**	63
18	GT2	98	(United Kingdom) Cirtek Motorsport (United States) Saleen-Allen Speedlab	(Italy) Mauro Casadei (Italy) Andrea Garbagnati (Italy) Angelo Zadra	Saleen Mustang SR	**D**	63
18	GT2	98	(United Kingdom) Cirtek Motorsport (United States) Saleen-Allen Speedlab	(Italy) Mauro Casadei (Italy) Andrea Garbagnati (Italy) Angelo Zadra	Ford 5.9L V8	**D**	63
19	GT1	27	(United Kingdom) Parabolica Motorsport (France) BBA Compétition	(France) Jean-Luc Maury-Laribière (France) Patrick Caternet (Germany) Steffen Widmann	McLaren F1 GTR	**D**	63
19	GT1	27	(United Kingdom) Parabolica Motorsport (France) BBA Compétition	(France) Jean-Luc Maury-Laribière (France) Patrick Caternet (Germany) Steffen Widmann	BMW S70 6.1L V12	**D**	63
20	GT2	66	(Germany) Konrad Motorsport	(Austria) Franz Konrad (United States) Nick Ham	Porsche 911 GT2	**D**	62
20	GT2	66	(Germany) Konrad Motorsport	(Austria) Franz Konrad (United States) Nick Ham	Porsche 3.6L Turbo Flat-6	**D**	62
21	GT2	76	(Germany) Seikel Motorsport	(Germany) Gerhard Marchner (Germany) Ernst Palmberger (Italy) Renato Mastropietro	Porsche 911 GT2	**P**	59
21	GT2	76	(Germany) Seikel Motorsport	(Germany) Gerhard Marchner (Germany) Ernst Palmberger (Italy) Renato Mastropietro	Porsche 3.6L Turbo Flat-6	**P**	59
22	GT1	11	(Germany) Team Persson Motorsport	(Germany) Bernd Mayländer (France) Christophe Bouchut	Mercedes-Benz CLK GTR	**B**	55
22	GT1	11	(Germany) Team Persson Motorsport	(Germany) Bernd Mayländer (France) Christophe Bouchut	Mercedes-Benz M120 6.0L V12	**B**	55
23	GT2	63	(Germany) Krauss Race Sports International	(Germany) Michael Trunk (Germany) Bernhard Müller	Porsche 911 GT2	**D**	53
23	GT2	63	(Germany) Krauss Race Sports International	(Germany) Michael Trunk (Germany) Bernhard Müller	Porsche 3.6L Turbo Flat-6	**D**	53
24	GT2	58	(Germany) Roock Sportsystem	(Germany) André Ahrlé (Thailand) Ratanakul Prutirat	Porsche 911 GT2	**Y**	53
24	GT2	58	(Germany) Roock Sportsystem	(Germany) André Ahrlé (Thailand) Ratanakul Prutirat	Porsche 3.6L Turbo Flat-6	**Y**	53
25 NC	GT2	74	(France) Paul Belmondo Racing	(France) Marc Rostan (France) Jacques Piattier (France) Francis Werner	Porsche 911 GT2	**P**	41
25 NC	GT2	74	(France) Paul Belmondo Racing	(France) Marc Rostan (France) Jacques Piattier (France) Francis Werner	Porsche 3.6L Turbo Flat-6	**P**	41
26 DNF	GT2	70	(Netherlands) Marcos Racing International	(Germany) Harald Becker (Netherlands) Cor Euser (United Kingdom) Christian Vann	Marcos LM600	**D**	28
26 DNF	GT2	70	(Netherlands) Marcos Racing International	(Germany) Harald Becker (Netherlands) Cor Euser (United Kingdom) Christian Vann	Chevrolet 5.9L V8	**D**	28
27 DNF	GT1	5	(Germany) Zakspeed Racing	(Germany) Alexander Grau (Germany) Andreas Scheld	Porsche 911 GT1-98	**P**	22
27 DNF	GT1	5	(Germany) Zakspeed Racing	(Germany) Alexander Grau (Germany) Andreas Scheld	Porsche 3.2L Turbo Flat-6	**P**	22
28 DNF	GT2	53	(United Kingdom) Chamberlain Engineering	(Portugal) Ni Amorim (Portugal) Gonçalo Gomes	Chrysler Viper GTS-R	**D**	12
28 DNF	GT2	53	(United Kingdom) Chamberlain Engineering	(Portugal) Ni Amorim (Portugal) Gonçalo Gomes	Chrysler 8.0L V10	**D**	12
29 DNF	GT2	69	(Germany) Proton Competition	(France) Patrick Vuillaume (Germany) Gerold Ried	Porsche 911 GT2	**P**	7
29 DNF	GT2	69	(Germany) Proton Competition	(France) Patrick Vuillaume (Germany) Gerold Ried	Porsche 3.6L Turbo Flat-6	**P**	7
DNS	GT1	9	(Netherlands) Team Hezemans	(Netherlands) Jan Lammers (Netherlands) Mike Hezemans	Bitter GT1	**G**	–
DNS	GT1	9	(Netherlands) Team Hezemans	(Netherlands) Jan Lammers (Netherlands) Mike Hezemans	Chrysler 8.0L V10	**G**	–
DNS	GT1	10	(Netherlands) Team Hezemans	(Germany) Rainer Bonnetsmüller (Austria) Manfred Jurasz (Germany) Michael Fielder	Bitter GT1	**G**	–
DNS	GT1	10	(Netherlands) Team Hezemans	(Germany) Rainer Bonnetsmüller (Austria) Manfred Jurasz (Germany) Michael Fielder	Chrysler 8.0L V10	**G**	–
DNS	GT2	75	(Switzerland) Swiss Team Salamin	(France) Bernard Schwach (Morocco) Max Cohen-Olivar	Porsche 911 GT2	?	–
DNS	GT2	75	(Switzerland) Swiss Team Salamin	(France) Bernard Schwach (Morocco) Max Cohen-Olivar	Porsche 3.6L Turbo Flat-6	?	–

== Statistics ==
- Pole position – #1 AMG Mercedes – 1:57.571
- Fastest lap – #1 AMG Mercedes – 2:00.333
- Average speed – 197.740 km/h

FIA GT Championship
Previous race: 1998 FIA GT Silverstone 500km	1998 season	Next race: 1998 FIA GT Dijon 500km
