= 1998 FIA GT Oschersleben 500 km =

Layout of the Motorsport Arena Oschersleben

The 1998 Oschersleben 500 was the opening round of the 1998 FIA GT Championship season. It took place at the Motorsport Arena Oschersleben, Germany, on April 12, 1998.

== Official results ==
Class winners are in bold. Cars failing to complete 70% of winner's distance are marked as Not Classified (NC).

Pos	Class	No	Team	Drivers	Chassis	Tyre	Laps
Pos	Class	No	Team	Drivers	Engine	Tyre	Laps
1	**GT1**	**2**	**(Germany) AMG Mercedes**	**(Brazil) Ricardo Zonta (Germany) Klaus Ludwig**	**Mercedes-Benz CLK GTR**	B	**137**
1	**GT1**	**2**	**(Germany) AMG Mercedes**	**(Brazil) Ricardo Zonta (Germany) Klaus Ludwig**	**Mercedes-Benz M120 6.0L V12**	B	**137**
2	GT1	12	(Germany) Team Persson Motorsport	(Germany) Marcel Tiemann (France) Jean-Marc Gounon	Mercedes-Benz CLK GTR	B	137
2	GT1	12	(Germany) Team Persson Motorsport	(Germany) Marcel Tiemann (France) Jean-Marc Gounon	Mercedes-Benz M120 6.0L V12	B	137
3	GT1	1	(Germany) AMG Mercedes	(Germany) Bernd Schneider (Australia) Mark Webber	Mercedes-Benz CLK GTR	B	135
3	GT1	1	(Germany) AMG Mercedes	(Germany) Bernd Schneider (Australia) Mark Webber	Mercedes-Benz M120 6.0L V12	B	135
4	GT1	5	(Germany) Zakspeed Racing	(Germany) Alexander Grau (Germany) Andreas Scheld	Porsche 911 GT1-98	P	134
4	GT1	5	(Germany) Zakspeed Racing	(Germany) Alexander Grau (Germany) Andreas Scheld	Porsche 3.2L Turbo Flat-6	P	134
5	GT1	3	(France) DAMS	(Australia) David Brabham (France) Éric Bernard	Panoz GTR-1	MI	130
5	GT1	3	(France) DAMS	(Australia) David Brabham (France) Éric Bernard	Ford (Roush) 6.0L V8	MI	130
6	**GT2**	**51**	**(France) Viper Team Oreca**	**(Monaco) Olivier Beretta (Portugal) Pedro Lamy**	**Chrysler Viper GTS-R**	MI	**126**
6	**GT2**	**51**	**(France) Viper Team Oreca**	**(Monaco) Olivier Beretta (Portugal) Pedro Lamy**	**Chrysler 8.0L V10**	MI	**126**
7	GT2	52	(France) Viper Team Oreca	(Austria) Karl Wendlinger (United States) David Donohue	Chrysler Viper GTS-R	MI	125
7	GT2	52	(France) Viper Team Oreca	(Austria) Karl Wendlinger (United States) David Donohue	Chrysler 8.0L V10	MI	125
8	GT2	66	(Germany) Konrad Motorsport	(Austria) Franz Konrad (United States) Nick Ham	Porsche 911 GT2	D	122
8	GT2	66	(Germany) Konrad Motorsport	(Austria) Franz Konrad (United States) Nick Ham	Porsche 3.6L Turbo Flat-6	D	122
9	GT2	65	(Germany) Konrad Motorsport	(Switzerland) Toni Seiler (United Kingdom) Martin Stretton	Porsche 911 GT2	D	122
9	GT2	65	(Germany) Konrad Motorsport	(Switzerland) Toni Seiler (United Kingdom) Martin Stretton	Porsche 3.6L Turbo Flat-6	D	122
10	GT2	63	(Germany) Krauss Race Sports International	(Germany) Michael Trunk (Germany) Bernhard Müller	Porsche 911 GT2	D	122
10	GT2	63	(Germany) Krauss Race Sports International	(Germany) Michael Trunk (Germany) Bernhard Müller	Porsche 3.6L Turbo Flat-6	D	122
11	GT2	70	(Netherlands) Marcos Racing International	(Netherlands) Cor Euser (Germany) Harald Becker	Marcos LM600	D	122
11	GT2	70	(Netherlands) Marcos Racing International	(Netherlands) Cor Euser (Germany) Harald Becker	Chevrolet 5.9L V8	D	122
12	GT2	60	(Switzerland) Elf Haberthur Racing	(Belgium) Michel Neugarten (Germany) Gerd Ruch (Italy) Marco Spinelli	Porsche 911 GT2	G	121
12	GT2	60	(Switzerland) Elf Haberthur Racing	(Belgium) Michel Neugarten (Germany) Gerd Ruch (Italy) Marco Spinelli	Porsche 3.6L Turbo Flat-6	G	121
13	GT2	53	(United Kingdom) Chamberlain Engineering	(Portugal) Ni Amorim (Portugal) Gonçalo Gomes	Chrysler Viper GTS-R	D	121
13	GT2	53	(United Kingdom) Chamberlain Engineering	(Portugal) Ni Amorim (Portugal) Gonçalo Gomes	Chrysler 8.0L V10	D	121
14	GT1	6	(Germany) Zakspeed Racing	(Germany) Michael Bartels (Germany) Armin Hahne	Porsche 911 GT1-98	P	120
14	GT1	6	(Germany) Zakspeed Racing	(Germany) Michael Bartels (Germany) Armin Hahne	Porsche 3.2L Turbo Flat-6	P	120
15	GT1	7	(Germany) Porsche AG	(United Kingdom) Allan McNish (France) Yannick Dalmas	Porsche 911 GT1-98	MI	119
15	GT1	7	(Germany) Porsche AG	(United Kingdom) Allan McNish (France) Yannick Dalmas	Porsche 3.2L Turbo Flat-6	MI	119
16	GT2	58	(Germany) Roock Sportsystem	(Germany) André Ahrlé (Thailand) Ratanakul Prutirat	Porsche 911 GT2	Y	119
16	GT2	58	(Germany) Roock Sportsystem	(Germany) André Ahrlé (Thailand) Ratanakul Prutirat	Porsche 3.6L Turbo Flat-6	Y	119
17	GT2	62	(Switzerland) Stadler Motorsport	(Switzerland) Uwe Sick (Germany) Axel Röhr	Porsche 911 GT2	P	119
17	GT2	62	(Switzerland) Stadler Motorsport	(Switzerland) Uwe Sick (Germany) Axel Röhr	Porsche 3.6L Turbo Flat-6	P	119
18	GT2	96	(Germany) Proton Competition	(Austria) Horst Felbermayr, Sr. (Austria) Horst Felbermayr, Jr.	Porsche 911 GT2	P	118
18	GT2	96	(Germany) Proton Competition	(Austria) Horst Felbermayr, Sr. (Austria) Horst Felbermayr, Jr.	Porsche 3.6L Turbo Flat-6	P	118
19	GT2	69	(Germany) Proton Competition	(Germany) Gerold Ried (France) Patrick Vuillaume	Porsche 911 GT2	P	115
19	GT2	69	(Germany) Proton Competition	(Germany) Gerold Ried (France) Patrick Vuillaume	Porsche 3.6L Turbo Flat-6	P	115
20	GT1	8	(Germany) Porsche AG	(Germany) Jörg Müller (Germany) Uwe Alzen	Porsche 911 GT1-98	MI	107
20	GT1	8	(Germany) Porsche AG	(Germany) Jörg Müller (Germany) Uwe Alzen	Porsche 3.2L Turbo Flat-6	MI	107
21 DNF	GT1	11	(Germany) Team Persson Motorsport	(France) Christophe Bouchut (Germany) Bernd Mayländer	Mercedes-Benz CLK GTR	B	86
21 DNF	GT1	11	(Germany) Team Persson Motorsport	(France) Christophe Bouchut (Germany) Bernd Mayländer	Mercedes-Benz M120 6.0L V12	B	86
22 DNF	GT2	54	(United Kingdom) Chamberlain Engineering	(United Kingdom) Ashley Ward (United States) Matt Turner	Chrysler Viper GTS-R	D	85
22 DNF	GT2	54	(United Kingdom) Chamberlain Engineering	(United Kingdom) Ashley Ward (United States) Matt Turner	Chrysler 8.0L V10	D	85
23 DNF	GT1	15	(United Kingdom) Davidoff Classic (United Kingdom) GTC Competition	(Germany) Thomas Bscher (United Kingdom) Geoff Lees	McLaren F1 GTR	G	77
23 DNF	GT1	15	(United Kingdom) Davidoff Classic (United Kingdom) GTC Competition	(Germany) Thomas Bscher (United Kingdom) Geoff Lees	BMW S70 6.0L V12	G	77
24 DNF	GT2	56	(Germany) Roock Racing	(Germany) Claudia Hürtgen (France) Stéphane Ortelli	Porsche 911 GT2	Y	69
24 DNF	GT2	56	(Germany) Roock Racing	(Germany) Claudia Hürtgen (France) Stéphane Ortelli	Porsche 3.6L Turbo Flat-6	Y	69
25 DNF	GT2	61	(Switzerland) Elf Haberthur Racing	(France) Hervé Poulain (France) Eric Graham (France) David Smadja	Porsche 911 GT2	G	69
25 DNF	GT2	61	(Switzerland) Elf Haberthur Racing	(France) Hervé Poulain (France) Eric Graham (France) David Smadja	Porsche 3.6L Turbo Flat-6	G	69
DSQ^{†}	GT2	57	(Germany) Roock Racing	(Switzerland) Bruno Eichmann (Germany) Sascha Maassen	Porsche 911 GT2	Y	123
DSQ^{†}	GT2	57	(Germany) Roock Racing	(Switzerland) Bruno Eichmann (Germany) Sascha Maassen	Porsche 3.6L Turbo Flat-6	Y	123

† – #57 Roock Racing was disqualified after failing post-race technical inspection. The car was found to have an illegal rear wing.

== Statistics ==
- Pole position – #8 Porsche AG – 1:19.335
- Fastest lap – #8 Porsche AG – 1:20.206
- Average speed – 161.087 km/h

FIA GT Championship
Previous race: None	1998 season	Next race: 1998 FIA GT Silverstone 500km
