= 1998 FIA GT Championship =

Auto racing championship

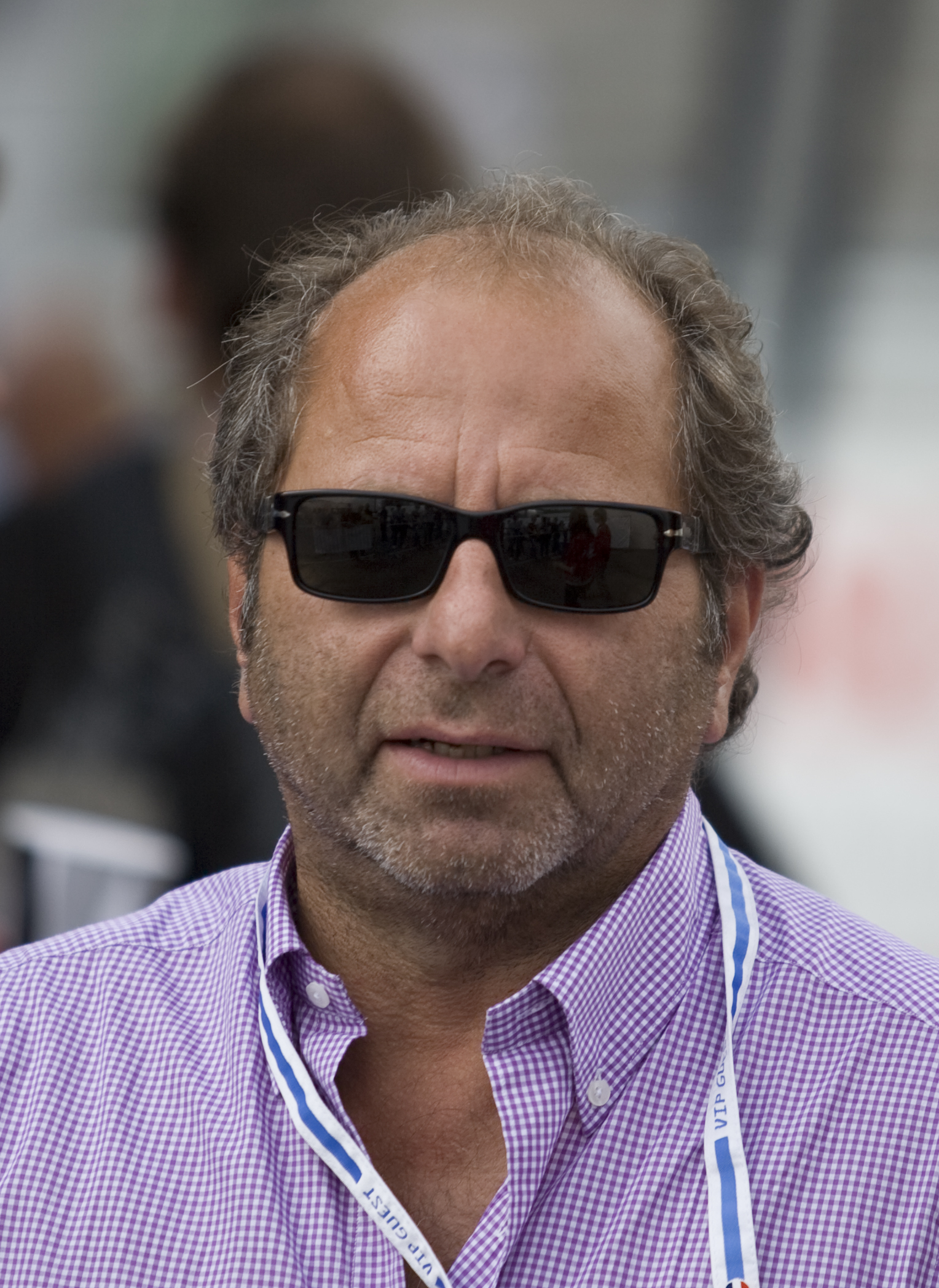
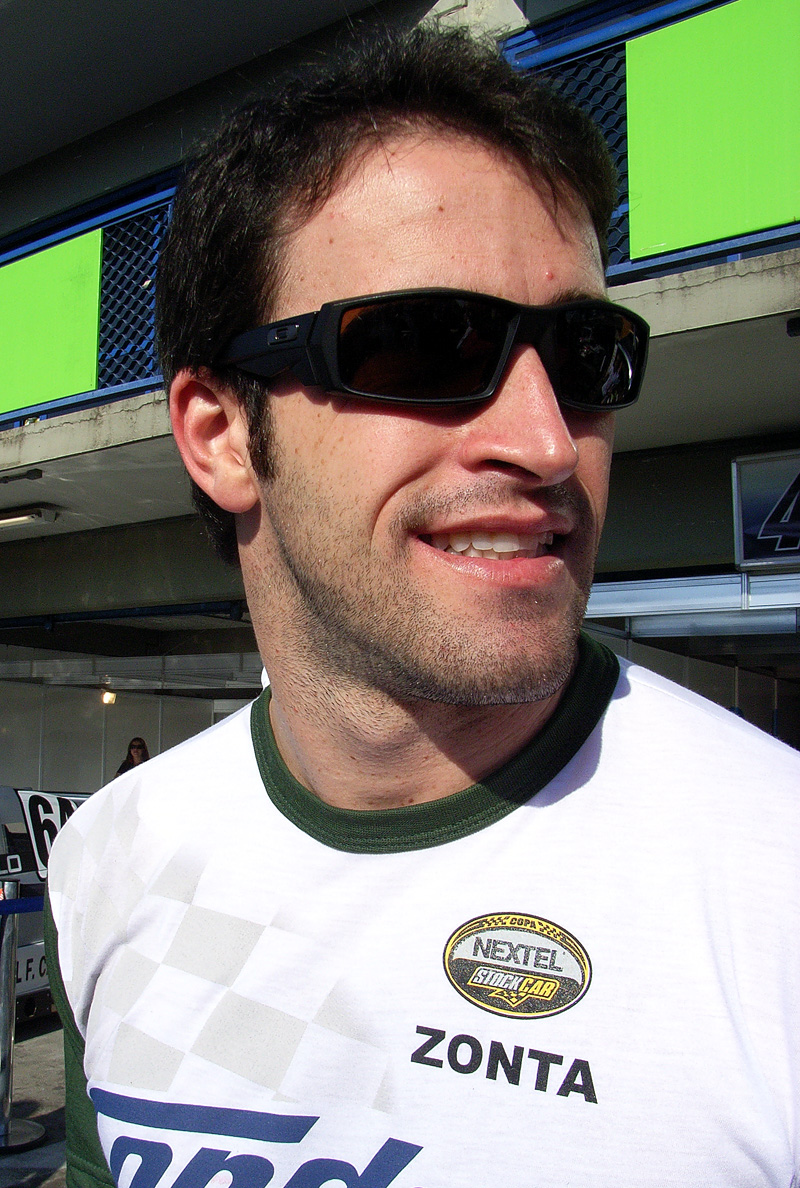
Klaus Ludwig and Ricardo Zonta won the GT1 Drivers' Championship for 1998

The 1998 FIA GT Championship marked the second season of FIA GT Championship, an auto racing series endorsed by the Fédération Internationale de l'Automobile (FIA) and managed by the Stéphane Ratel Organisation (SRO). The races showcased grand touring cars adhering to two categories of regulations, GT1 and GT2, and awarded driver and team championships in each category. Commencing on 12 April 1998, the season concluded on 25 October 1998 after ten rounds, spanning across Europe, Japan, and the United States.

The GT1 championships were won by Klaus Ludwig and Ricardo Zonta of the repeat champions AMG Mercedes, while the GT2 title was awarded to Olivier Beretta and Pedro Lamy of Viper Team Oreca. Subsequent to the season, the GT1 category was eliminated from the FIA GT Championship due to insufficient entries for 1999.

== Schedule ==
All races were shortened to a 500 km (310 mi) distance with the exception of Suzuka. Oschersleben replaced the Nürburgring as the second German round of the series, while Hungaroring and Dijon-Prenois replaced Mugello, Spa, and Helsinki for the rest of the European calendar.

| Rnd | Race | Circuit | Date |
|---|---|---|---|
| 1 | Oschersleben 500 | Motopark Oschersleben, Oschersleben, Germany | 12 April |
| 2 | British Empire Trophy Race | Silverstone Circuit, Silverstone, United Kingdom | 17 May |
| 3 | Hockenheim 500 | Hockenheimring, Hockenheim, Germany | 28 June |
| 4 | 500 km de Dijon | Dijon-Prenois, Prenois, France | 12 July |
| 5 | Hungaroring 500 | Hungaroring, Mogyoród, Hungary | 19 July |
| 6 | Suzuka 1000 km | Suzuka Circuit, Suzuka, Japan | 23 August |
| 7 | Donington 500 | Donington Park, Leicestershire, United Kingdom | 6 September |
| 8 | 500 km Zeltweg | A1-Ring, Spielberg, Austria | 20 September |
| 9 | Miami 500 | Homestead-Miami Speedway, Homestead, United States | 18 October |
| 10 | Visa Sports Car Championships | Laguna Seca Raceway, Monterey, United States | 25 October |

== Entries ==
=== GT1 ===
| Entrant | Car | Engine | Tyre | No. | Drivers | Rounds |
|---|---|---|---|---|---|---|
| (Germany) AMG Mercedes | Mercedes-Benz CLK GTR; Mercedes-Benz CLK LM | Mercedes-Benz GT112 6.0 L V12; Mercedes-Benz GT108B 5.0 L V8 | B | 1 | (Germany) Bernd Schneider | All |
| (Germany) AMG Mercedes | Mercedes-Benz CLK GTR; Mercedes-Benz CLK LM | Mercedes-Benz GT112 6.0 L V12; Mercedes-Benz GT108B 5.0 L V8 | B | 1 | (Australia) Mark Webber | All |
| (Germany) AMG Mercedes | Mercedes-Benz CLK GTR; Mercedes-Benz CLK LM | Mercedes-Benz GT112 6.0 L V12; Mercedes-Benz GT108B 5.0 L V8 | B | 2 | (Brazil) Ricardo Zonta | All |
| (Germany) AMG Mercedes | Mercedes-Benz CLK GTR; Mercedes-Benz CLK LM | Mercedes-Benz GT112 6.0 L V12; Mercedes-Benz GT108B 5.0 L V8 | B | 2 | (Germany) Klaus Ludwig | All |
| (France) DAMS | Panoz GTR-1 | Ford-Roush 6.0 L V8 | M | 3 | (France) Éric Bernard | 1–5, 7, 9–10 |
| (France) DAMS | Panoz GTR-1 | Ford-Roush 6.0 L V8 | M | 3 | (Australia) David Brabham | 1–5, 7, 9–10 |
| (France) DAMS | Panoz GTR-1 | Ford-Roush 6.0 L V8 | M | 3 | (France) Franck Lagorce | 6, 8 |
| (France) DAMS | Panoz GTR-1 | Ford-Roush 6.0 L V8 | M | 3 | (France) Christophe Tinseau | 6, 8 |
| (France) DAMS | Panoz GTR-1 | Ford-Roush 6.0 L V8 | M | 3 | (United States) Johnny O'Connell | 6 |
| (Germany) Zakspeed Racing | Porsche 911 GT1-98 | Porsche 3.2 L Turbo Flat-6 | P | 5 | (Germany) Andreas Scheld | 1–5, 7–9 |
| (Germany) Zakspeed Racing | Porsche 911 GT1-98 | Porsche 3.2 L Turbo Flat-6 | P | 5 | (Germany) Alexander Grau | 1–5 |
| (Germany) Zakspeed Racing | Porsche 911 GT1-98 | Porsche 3.2 L Turbo Flat-6 | P | 5 | (Germany) Armin Hahne | 6–9 |
| (Germany) Zakspeed Racing | Porsche 911 GT1-98 | Porsche 3.2 L Turbo Flat-6 | P | 5 | (France) Fabien Giroix | 6 |
| (Germany) Zakspeed Racing | Porsche 911 GT1-98 | Porsche 3.2 L Turbo Flat-6 | P | 5 | (Switzerland) Jean-Denis Délétraz | 6 |
| (Germany) Zakspeed Racing | Porsche 911 GT1-98 | Porsche 3.2 L Turbo Flat-6 | P | 6 | (Germany) Michael Bartels | All |
| (Germany) Zakspeed Racing | Porsche 911 GT1-98 | Porsche 3.2 L Turbo Flat-6 | P | 6 | (Germany) Armin Hahne | 1–5 |
| (Germany) Zakspeed Racing | Porsche 911 GT1-98 | Porsche 3.2 L Turbo Flat-6 | P | 6 | (Germany) Alexander Grau | 6 |
| (Germany) Zakspeed Racing | Porsche 911 GT1-98 | Porsche 3.2 L Turbo Flat-6 | P | 6 | (Germany) Andreas Scheld | 6 |
| (Germany) Zakspeed Racing | Porsche 911 GT1-98 | Porsche 3.2 L Turbo Flat-6 | P | 6 | (Italy) Max Angelelli | 7–10 |
| (Germany) Porsche AG | Porsche 911 GT1-98 | Porsche 3.2 L Turbo Flat-6 | M | 7 | (United Kingdom) Allan McNish | All |
| (Germany) Porsche AG | Porsche 911 GT1-98 | Porsche 3.2 L Turbo Flat-6 | M | 7 | (France) Yannick Dalmas | 1, 3–10 |
| (Germany) Porsche AG | Porsche 911 GT1-98 | Porsche 3.2 L Turbo Flat-6 | M | 7 | (France) Bob Wollek | 2 |
| (Germany) Porsche AG | Porsche 911 GT1-98 | Porsche 3.2 L Turbo Flat-6 | M | 7 | (Monaco) Stéphane Ortelli | 6 |
| (Germany) Porsche AG | Porsche 911 GT1-98 | Porsche 3.2 L Turbo Flat-6 | M | 8 | (Germany) Jörg Müller | All |
| (Germany) Porsche AG | Porsche 911 GT1-98 | Porsche 3.2 L Turbo Flat-6 | M | 8 | (Germany) Uwe Alzen | 1–4, 6–10 |
| (Germany) Porsche AG | Porsche 911 GT1-98 | Porsche 3.2 L Turbo Flat-6 | M | 8 | (France) Bob Wollek | 5–6 |
| (Netherlands) Team Hezemans | Bitter GT1 | Chrysler 356-T6 8.0 L V10 | G | 9 | (Netherlands) Jan Lammers | 2–3 |
| (Netherlands) Team Hezemans | Bitter GT1 | Chrysler 356-T6 8.0 L V10 | G | 9 | (Netherlands) Mike Hezemans | 2–3 |
| (Netherlands) Team Hezemans | Bitter GT1 | Chrysler 356-T6 8.0 L V10 | G | 10 | (Germany) Rainer Bonnetsmüller | 2–3 |
| (Netherlands) Team Hezemans | Bitter GT1 | Chrysler 356-T6 8.0 L V10 | G | 10 | (Austria) Manfred Jurasz | 2–3 |
| (Netherlands) Team Hezemans | Bitter GT1 | Chrysler 356-T6 8.0 L V10 | G | 10 | (Germany) Stefan Hackl | 2 |
| (Netherlands) Team Hezemans | Bitter GT1 | Chrysler 356-T6 8.0 L V10 | G | 10 | (Germany) Michael Fielder | 3 |
| (Germany) Team Persson Motorsport | Mercedes-Benz CLK GTR | Mercedes-Benz GT112 6.0 L V12 | B | 11 | (France) Christophe Bouchut | All |
| (Germany) Team Persson Motorsport | Mercedes-Benz CLK GTR | Mercedes-Benz GT112 6.0 L V12 | B | 11 | (Germany) Bernd Mayländer | All |
| (Germany) Team Persson Motorsport | Mercedes-Benz CLK GTR | Mercedes-Benz GT112 6.0 L V12 | B | 12 | (Germany) Marcel Tiemann | All |
| (Germany) Team Persson Motorsport | Mercedes-Benz CLK GTR | Mercedes-Benz GT112 6.0 L V12 | B | 12 | (France) Jean-Marc Gounon | All |
| (United Kingdom) Davidoff Classic | McLaren F1 GTR | BMW S70/2 6.0 L V12 | G | 15 | (Germany) Thomas Bscher | 1–3, 5–8 |
| (United Kingdom) Davidoff Classic | McLaren F1 GTR | BMW S70/2 6.0 L V12 | G | 15 | (United Kingdom) Geoff Lees | 1–3, 5–8 |
| (France) Larbre Compétition | Porsche 911 GT1 Evo | Porsche 3.2 L Turbo Flat-6 | M | 17 | (France) Patrice Goueslard | 4–5 |
| (France) Larbre Compétition | Porsche 911 GT1 Evo | Porsche 3.2 L Turbo Flat-6 | M | 17 | (France) Bob Wollek | 4 |
| (France) Larbre Compétition | Porsche 911 GT1 Evo | Porsche 3.2 L Turbo Flat-6 | M | 17 | (Sweden) Carl Rosenblad | 4 |
| (France) Larbre Compétition | Porsche 911 GT1 Evo | Porsche 3.2 L Turbo Flat-6 | M | 17 | (France) Jack Leconte | 5 |
| (France) Larbre Compétition | Porsche 911 GT1 Evo | Porsche 3.2 L Turbo Flat-6 | M | 17 | (France) Jean-Luc Chéreau | 5 |
| (France) Parabolica Motorsports | McLaren F1 GTR | BMW S70/2 6.0 L V12 | D | 27 | (France) Jean-Luc Maury-Laribière | 2–4 |
| (France) Parabolica Motorsports | McLaren F1 GTR | BMW S70/2 6.0 L V12 | D | 27 | (France) Patrick Caternet | 2–4 |
| (France) Parabolica Motorsports | McLaren F1 GTR | BMW S70/2 6.0 L V12 | D | 27 | (Germany) Stefan Widmann | 3 |

=== GT2 ===
| Entrant | Car | Engine | Tyre | No. | Drivers | Rounds |
|---|---|---|---|---|---|---|
| (France) Viper Team Oreca | Chrysler Viper GTS-R | Chrysler 356-T6 8.0 L V10 | M | 51 | (Monaco) Olivier Beretta | All |
| (France) Viper Team Oreca | Chrysler Viper GTS-R | Chrysler 356-T6 8.0 L V10 | M | 51 | (Portugal) Pedro Lamy | All |
| (France) Viper Team Oreca | Chrysler Viper GTS-R | Chrysler 356-T6 8.0 L V10 | M | 51 | (France) Dominique Dupuy | 6 |
| (France) Viper Team Oreca | Chrysler Viper GTS-R | Chrysler 356-T6 8.0 L V10 | M | 52 | (Austria) Karl Wendlinger | All |
| (France) Viper Team Oreca | Chrysler Viper GTS-R | Chrysler 356-T6 8.0 L V10 | M | 52 | (United States) David Donohue | 1, 3–4, 9–10 |
| (France) Viper Team Oreca | Chrysler Viper GTS-R | Chrysler 356-T6 8.0 L V10 | M | 52 | (United Kingdom) Justin Bell | 2, 6–8 |
| (France) Viper Team Oreca | Chrysler Viper GTS-R | Chrysler 356-T6 8.0 L V10 | M | 52 | (Belgium) Marc Duez | 5 |
| (France) Viper Team Oreca | Chrysler Viper GTS-R | Chrysler 356-T6 8.0 L V10 | M | 52 | (Japan) Hideshi Matsuda | 6 |
| (United Kingdom) Chamberlain Engineering | Chrysler Viper GTS-R | Chrysler 356-T6 8.0 L V10 | D | 53 | (Portugal) Ni Amorim | 1–5, 7–10 |
| (United Kingdom) Chamberlain Engineering | Chrysler Viper GTS-R | Chrysler 356-T6 8.0 L V10 | D | 53 | (Portugal) Gonçalo Gomes | 1–3 |
| (United Kingdom) Chamberlain Engineering | Chrysler Viper GTS-R | Chrysler 356-T6 8.0 L V10 | D | 53 | (United Kingdom) Gary Ayles | 4–5 |
| (United Kingdom) Chamberlain Engineering | Chrysler Viper GTS-R | Chrysler 356-T6 8.0 L V10 | D | 53 | (United States) Matt Turner | 6–7 |
| (United Kingdom) Chamberlain Engineering | Chrysler Viper GTS-R | Chrysler 356-T6 8.0 L V10 | D | 53 | (Netherlands) Hans Hugenholtz Jr. | 6, 9–10 |
| (United Kingdom) Chamberlain Engineering | Chrysler Viper GTS-R | Chrysler 356-T6 8.0 L V10 | D | 53 | (Japan) Hiroshi Sakai | 6 |
| (United Kingdom) Chamberlain Engineering | Chrysler Viper GTS-R | Chrysler 356-T6 8.0 L V10 | D | 53 | (United Kingdom) Martin Short | 7 |
| (United Kingdom) Chamberlain Engineering | Chrysler Viper GTS-R | Chrysler 356-T6 8.0 L V10 | D | 53 | (Austria) Manfred Stohl | 8 |
| (United Kingdom) Chamberlain Engineering | Chrysler Viper GTS-R | Chrysler 356-T6 8.0 L V10 | D | 53 | (United Kingdom) Dominic Chappell | 9 |
| (United Kingdom) Chamberlain Engineering | Chrysler Viper GTS-R | Chrysler 356-T6 8.0 L V10 | D | 53 | (United States) Spencer Trenery | 10 |
| (United Kingdom) Chamberlain Engineering | Chrysler Viper GTS-R | Chrysler 356-T6 8.0 L V10 | D | 54 | (United States) Matt Turner | 1–2 |
| (United Kingdom) Chamberlain Engineering | Chrysler Viper GTS-R | Chrysler 356-T6 8.0 L V10 | D | 54 | (United Kingdom) Ashley Ward | 1 |
| (United Kingdom) Chamberlain Engineering | Chrysler Viper GTS-R | Chrysler 356-T6 8.0 L V10 | D | 54 | (Netherlands) Hans Hugenholtz Jr. | 2 |
| (United States) Saleen-Allen Speedlab | Saleen Mustang SR | Ford 5.9 L V8 | | 55 | (United States) Andy Pilgrim | 10 |
| (United States) Saleen-Allen Speedlab | Saleen Mustang SR | Ford 5.9 L V8 | | 55 | (United States) Terry Borcheller | 10 |
| (United States) Saleen-Allen Speedlab | Saleen Mustang SR | Ford 5.9 L V8 | | 55 | (United States) Ron Johnson | 10 |
| (Germany) Roock Racing | Porsche 911 GT2 | Porsche 3.6 L Turbo Flat-6 | Y | 56 | (Germany) Claudia Hürtgen | All |
| (Germany) Roock Racing | Porsche 911 GT2 | Porsche 3.6 L Turbo Flat-6 | Y | 56 | (Monaco) Stéphane Ortelli | 1–3, 5, 7–10 |
| (Germany) Roock Racing | Porsche 911 GT2 | Porsche 3.6 L Turbo Flat-6 | Y | 56 | (France) Emmanuel Collard | 4 |
| (Germany) Roock Racing | Porsche 911 GT2 | Porsche 3.6 L Turbo Flat-6 | Y | 56 | (Netherlands) Mike Hezemans | 6 |
| (Germany) Roock Racing | Porsche 911 GT2 | Porsche 3.6 L Turbo Flat-6 | Y | 56 | (Netherlands) Jan Lammers | 6 |
| (Germany) Roock Racing | Porsche 911 GT2 | Porsche 3.6 L Turbo Flat-6 | Y | 57 | (Switzerland) Bruno Eichmann | All |
| (Germany) Roock Racing | Porsche 911 GT2 | Porsche 3.6 L Turbo Flat-6 | Y | 57 | (Germany) Sascha Maassen | 1–6 |
| (Germany) Roock Racing | Porsche 911 GT2 | Porsche 3.6 L Turbo Flat-6 | Y | 57 | (Japan) Hisashi Wada | 6 |
| (Germany) Roock Racing | Porsche 911 GT2 | Porsche 3.6 L Turbo Flat-6 | Y | 57 | (Netherlands) Mike Hezemans | 7–10 |
| (Germany) Roock Racing | Porsche 911 GT2 | Porsche 3.6 L Turbo Flat-6 | Y | 57 | (Germany) André Ahrlé | 7 |
| (Germany) Roock Sportsystem | Porsche 911 GT2 | Porsche 3.6 L Turbo Flat-6 | Y | 58 | (Germany) André Ahrlé | 1–6, 8–10 |
| (Germany) Roock Sportsystem | Porsche 911 GT2 | Porsche 3.6 L Turbo Flat-6 | Y | 58 | (Thailand) Ratanakul Prutirat | 1, 3–6 |
| (Germany) Roock Sportsystem | Porsche 911 GT2 | Porsche 3.6 L Turbo Flat-6 | Y | 58 | (United Kingdom) Tim Sugden | 2 |
| (Germany) Roock Sportsystem | Porsche 911 GT2 | Porsche 3.6 L Turbo Flat-6 | Y | 58 | (United Kingdom) Peter Owen | 2 |
| (Germany) Roock Sportsystem | Porsche 911 GT2 | Porsche 3.6 L Turbo Flat-6 | Y | 58 | (United Kingdom) Robert Nearn | 6 |
| (Germany) Roock Sportsystem | Porsche 911 GT2 | Porsche 3.6 L Turbo Flat-6 | Y | 58 | (United Kingdom) John Robinson | 7 |
| (Germany) Roock Sportsystem | Porsche 911 GT2 | Porsche 3.6 L Turbo Flat-6 | Y | 58 | (United Kingdom) Hugh Price | 7 |
| (Germany) Roock Sportsystem | Porsche 911 GT2 | Porsche 3.6 L Turbo Flat-6 | Y | 58 | (Germany) Sascha Maassen | 8 |
| (Germany) Roock Sportsystem | Porsche 911 GT2 | Porsche 3.6 L Turbo Flat-6 | Y | 58 | (United States) Andy Pilgrim | 9 |
| (Germany) Roock Sportsystem | Porsche 911 GT2 | Porsche 3.6 L Turbo Flat-6 | Y | 58 | (United Kingdom) Robert Schirle | 10 |
| (Germany) Roock Sportsystem | Porsche 911 GT2 | Porsche 3.6 L Turbo Flat-6 | Y | 58 | (United States) Dirk Layer | 10 |
| (Switzerland) Elf Haberthur Racing | Porsche 911 GT2 | Porsche 3.6 L Flat-6 | G | 60 | (Belgium) Michel Neugarten | All |
| (Switzerland) Elf Haberthur Racing | Porsche 911 GT2 | Porsche 3.6 L Flat-6 | G | 60 | (Germany) Gerd Ruch | All |
| (Switzerland) Elf Haberthur Racing | Porsche 911 GT2 | Porsche 3.6 L Flat-6 | G | 60 | (Italy) Marco Spinelli | 1–5, 7–8 |
| (Switzerland) Elf Haberthur Racing | Porsche 911 GT2 | Porsche 3.6 L Flat-6 | G | 60 | (France) Michel Ligonnet | 6 |
| (Switzerland) Elf Haberthur Racing | Porsche 911 GT2 | Porsche 3.6 L Flat-6 | G | 60 | (United States) Zak Brown | 9–10 |
| (Switzerland) Elf Haberthur Racing | Porsche 911 GT2 | Porsche 3.6 L Flat-6 | G | 61 | (France) Éric Graham | 1, 3–4, 6–7 |
| (Switzerland) Elf Haberthur Racing | Porsche 911 GT2 | Porsche 3.6 L Flat-6 | G | 61 | (France) David Smadja | 1, 3, 6–7 |
| (Switzerland) Elf Haberthur Racing | Porsche 911 GT2 | Porsche 3.6 L Flat-6 | G | 61 | (France) Hervé Poulain | 1, 4 |
| (Switzerland) Elf Haberthur Racing | Porsche 911 GT2 | Porsche 3.6 L Flat-6 | G | 61 | (France) David Velay | 3–4 |
| (Switzerland) Elf Haberthur Racing | Porsche 911 GT2 | Porsche 3.6 L Flat-6 | G | 61 | (Italy) Mauro Casadei | 5, 8–9 |
| (Switzerland) Elf Haberthur Racing | Porsche 911 GT2 | Porsche 3.6 L Flat-6 | G | 61 | (Germany) Kersten Jodexnis | 5 |
| (Switzerland) Elf Haberthur Racing | Porsche 911 GT2 | Porsche 3.6 L Flat-6 | G | 61 | (Switzerland) Dieter Fähler | 5 |
| (Switzerland) Elf Haberthur Racing | Porsche 911 GT2 | Porsche 3.6 L Flat-6 | G | 61 | (Japan) Masahiro Kimoto | 6 |
| (Switzerland) Elf Haberthur Racing | Porsche 911 GT2 | Porsche 3.6 L Flat-6 | G | 61 | (France) Emmanuel Clérico | 7 |
| (Switzerland) Elf Haberthur Racing | Porsche 911 GT2 | Porsche 3.6 L Flat-6 | G | 61 | (Belgium) Bruno Lambert | 8, 10 |
| (Switzerland) Elf Haberthur Racing | Porsche 911 GT2 | Porsche 3.6 L Flat-6 | G | 61 | (Austria) Karl Baron | 8 |
| (Switzerland) Elf Haberthur Racing | Porsche 911 GT2 | Porsche 3.6 L Flat-6 | G | 61 | (Germany) Klaus Horn | 9 |
| (Switzerland) Elf Haberthur Racing | Porsche 911 GT2 | Porsche 3.6 L Flat-6 | G | 61 | (United States) Mike Conte | 10 |
| (Switzerland) Stadler Motorsport | Porsche 911 GT2 | Porsche 3.6 L Turbo Flat-6 | P | 62 | (Switzerland) Uwe Sick | All |
| (Switzerland) Stadler Motorsport | Porsche 911 GT2 | Porsche 3.6 L Turbo Flat-6 | P | 62 | (Germany) Axel Röhr | 1-5, 7–9 |
| (Switzerland) Stadler Motorsport | Porsche 911 GT2 | Porsche 3.6 L Turbo Flat-6 | P | 62 | (Switzerland) Franz Hunkeler | 6 |
| (Switzerland) Stadler Motorsport | Porsche 911 GT2 | Porsche 3.6 L Turbo Flat-6 | P | 62 | (Switzerland) Jörg Clavuot | 6 |
| (Switzerland) Stadler Motorsport | Porsche 911 GT2 | Porsche 3.6 L Turbo Flat-6 | P | 62 | (Italy) Renato Mastropietro | 9–10 |
| (Switzerland) Stadler Motorsport | Porsche 911 GT2 | Porsche 3.6 L Turbo Flat-6 | P | 62 | (United States) Will Langhorne | 10 |
| (Germany) Krauss Race Sports International | Porsche 911 GT2 | Porsche 3.6 L Turbo Flat-6 | D | 63 | (Germany) Michael Trunk | 1–5, 7–10 |
| (Germany) Krauss Race Sports International | Porsche 911 GT2 | Porsche 3.6 L Turbo Flat-6 | D | 63 | (Germany) Bernhard Müller | 1–5, 7–10 |
| (Germany) Konrad Motorsport | Porsche 911 GT2 | Porsche 3.6 L Turbo Flat-6 | D | 65 | (United Kingdom) Martin Stretton | All |
| (Germany) Konrad Motorsport | Porsche 911 GT2 | Porsche 3.6 L Turbo Flat-6 | D | 65 | (Switzerland) Toni Seiler | 1–5, 7–10 |
| (Germany) Konrad Motorsport | Porsche 911 GT2 | Porsche 3.6 L Turbo Flat-6 | D | 65 | (Japan) Yukihiro Hane | 6 |
| (Germany) Konrad Motorsport | Porsche 911 GT2 | Porsche 3.6 L Turbo Flat-6 | D | 65 | (Japan) Jun Harada | 6 |
| (Germany) Konrad Motorsport | Porsche 911 GT2 | Porsche 3.6 L Turbo Flat-6 | D | 66 | (Austria) Franz Konrad | All |
| (Germany) Konrad Motorsport | Porsche 911 GT2 | Porsche 3.6 L Turbo Flat-6 | D | 66 | (United States) Nick Ham | 1–3 |
| (Germany) Konrad Motorsport | Porsche 911 GT2 | Porsche 3.6 L Turbo Flat-6 | D | 66 | (France) Stéphane Sallaz | 4, 6 |
| (Germany) Konrad Motorsport | Porsche 911 GT2 | Porsche 3.6 L Turbo Flat-6 | D | 66 | (Germany) Altfrid Heger | 5–8 |
| (Germany) Konrad Motorsport | Porsche 911 GT2 | Porsche 3.6 L Turbo Flat-6 | D | 66 | (Netherlands) Jan Lammers | 9–10 |
| (Germany) Remus Racing | Porsche 911 GT2 | Porsche 3.6 L Turbo Flat-6 | | 67 | (Germany) Wido Rössler | 8 |
| (Germany) Remus Racing | Porsche 911 GT2 | Porsche 3.6 L Turbo Flat-6 | | 67 | (Germany) Herbert Drexler | 8 |
| (Germany) Proton Competition | Porsche 911 GT2 | Porsche 3.6 L Turbo Flat-6 | P | 69 | (Germany) Gerold Ried | All |
| (Germany) Proton Competition | Porsche 911 GT2 | Porsche 3.6 L Turbo Flat-6 | P | 69 | (France) Patrick Vuillaume | All |
| (Germany) Proton Competition | Porsche 911 GT2 | Porsche 3.6 L Turbo Flat-6 | P | 69 | (Austria) Manfred Jurasz | 6 |
| (Germany) Proton Competition | Porsche 911 GT2 | Porsche 3.6 L Turbo Flat-6 | P | 96 | (Austria) Horst Felbermayr | 1–5, 7–8 |
| (Germany) Proton Competition | Porsche 911 GT2 | Porsche 3.6 L Turbo Flat-6 | P | 96 | (Austria) Horst Felbermayr Jr. | 1–5, 7–8 |
| (Netherlands) Marcos Racing International | Marcos LM600 | Chevrolet 5.9 L V8 | D | 70 | (Netherlands) Cor Euser | All |
| (Netherlands) Marcos Racing International | Marcos LM600 | Chevrolet 5.9 L V8 | D | 70 | (Germany) Harald Becker | All |
| (Netherlands) Marcos Racing International | Marcos LM600 | Chevrolet 5.9 L V8 | D | 70 | (United Kingdom) Christian Vann | 3–4, 6–10 |
| (Netherlands) Marcos Racing International | Marcos LM600 | Chevrolet 5.9 L V8 | D | 71 | (Netherlands) Herman Buurman | 9–10 |
| (Netherlands) Marcos Racing International | Marcos LM600 | Chevrolet 5.9 L V8 | D | 71 | (South Africa) Manno Schaafsma | 9–10 |
| (France) Paul Belmondo Racing | Porsche 911 GT2 | Porsche 3.6 L Flat-6 | P | 74 | (France) Marc Rostan | 3 |
| (France) Paul Belmondo Racing | Porsche 911 GT2 | Porsche 3.6 L Flat-6 | P | 74 | (France) Jacques Plattier | 3 |
| (France) Paul Belmondo Racing | Porsche 911 GT2 | Porsche 3.6 L Flat-6 | P | 74 | (France) Francis Werner | 3 |
| (Switzerland) Swiss Team Salamin | Porsche 911 GT2 | Porsche 3.6 L Turbo Flat-6 | | 75 | (Morocco) Max Cohen-Olivar | 3 |
| (Switzerland) Swiss Team Salamin | Porsche 911 GT2 | Porsche 3.6 L Turbo Flat-6 | | 75 | (France) Bernard Schwach | 3 |
| (Germany) Seikel Motorsport | Porsche 911 GT2 | Porsche 3.6 L Turbo Flat-6 | P | 76 | (Germany) Ernst Palmberger | 3, 5, 8 |
| (Germany) Seikel Motorsport | Porsche 911 GT2 | Porsche 3.6 L Turbo Flat-6 | P | 76 | (Germany) Gerhard Marchner | 3, 8 |
| (Germany) Seikel Motorsport | Porsche 911 GT2 | Porsche 3.6 L Turbo Flat-6 | P | 76 | (Italy) Renato Mastropietro | 3 |
| (Germany) Seikel Motorsport | Porsche 911 GT2 | Porsche 3.6 L Turbo Flat-6 | P | 76 | (Germany) Peter Seikel | 4 |
| (Germany) Seikel Motorsport | Porsche 911 GT2 | Porsche 3.6 L Turbo Flat-6 | P | 76 | (Germany) Fred Rosterg | 4 |
| (Germany) Seikel Motorsport | Porsche 911 GT2 | Porsche 3.6 L Turbo Flat-6 | P | 76 | (France) Bernard Schwach | 4 |
| (Germany) Seikel Motorsport | Porsche 911 GT2 | Porsche 3.6 L Turbo Flat-6 | P | 76 | (United Kingdom) Nigel Smith | 5–7, 9–10 |
| (Germany) Seikel Motorsport | Porsche 911 GT2 | Porsche 3.6 L Turbo Flat-6 | P | 76 | (United Kingdom) Robert Nearn | 5 |
| (Germany) Seikel Motorsport | Porsche 911 GT2 | Porsche 3.6 L Turbo Flat-6 | P | 76 | (Japan) Takashi Suzuki | 6 |
| (Germany) Seikel Motorsport | Porsche 911 GT2 | Porsche 3.6 L Turbo Flat-6 | P | 76 | (Morocco) Max Cohen-Olivar | 7, 9–10 |
| (Germany) Seikel Motorsport | Porsche 911 GT2 | Porsche 3.6 L Turbo Flat-6 | P | 76 | (France) Jean-François Véroux | 7 |
| (Germany) Seikel Motorsport | Porsche 911 GT2 | Porsche 3.6 L Turbo Flat-6 | P | 76 | (Austria) Manfred Jurasz | 8 |
| (Germany) Seikel Motorsport | Porsche 911 GT2 | Porsche 3.6 L Turbo Flat-6 | P | 76 | (New Zealand) Andrew Bagnall | 9–10 |
| (Germany) Seikel Motorsport | Porsche 911 GT2 | Porsche 3.6 L Turbo Flat-6 | P | 87 | (Germany) Gerhard Marchner | 6, 9–10 |
| (Germany) Seikel Motorsport | Porsche 911 GT2 | Porsche 3.6 L Turbo Flat-6 | P | 87 | (Japan) Sumio Sakurai Suzuki | 6 |
| (Germany) Seikel Motorsport | Porsche 911 GT2 | Porsche 3.6 L Turbo Flat-6 | P | 87 | (Japan) Tomiko Yoshikawa | 6 |
| (Germany) Seikel Motorsport | Porsche 911 GT2 | Porsche 3.6 L Turbo Flat-6 | P | 87 | (Austria) Manfred Jurasz | 9–10 |
| (Germany) Seikel Motorsport | Porsche 911 GT2 | Porsche 3.6 L Turbo Flat-6 | P | 87 | (Germany) Christian Vogler | 9 |
| (Germany) Seikel Motorsport | Porsche 911 GT2 | Porsche 3.6 L Turbo Flat-6 | P | 87 | (Canada) Tony Burgess | 10 |
| (France) Sonauto Levallois | Porsche 911 GT2 | Porsche 3.6 L Turbo Flat-6 | P | 77 | (France) Jean-Pierre Jarier | 4 |
| (France) Sonauto Levallois | Porsche 911 GT2 | Porsche 3.6 L Turbo Flat-6 | P | 77 | (France) François Lafon | 4 |
| (Hungary) Bovi Motorsport | Porsche 911 GT2 | Porsche 3.6 L Turbo Flat-6 | | 78 | (Hungary) Kálmán Bódis | 5, 8 |
| (Hungary) Bovi Motorsport | Porsche 911 GT2 | Porsche 3.6 L Turbo Flat-6 | | 78 | (Hungary) Attila Barta | 5 |
| (Hungary) Bovi Motorsport | Porsche 911 GT2 | Porsche 3.6 L Turbo Flat-6 | | 78 | (Austria) Herbert Jerish | 5 |
| (Hungary) Bovi Motorsport | Porsche 911 GT2 | Porsche 3.6 L Turbo Flat-6 | | 78 | (Hungary) Ferenc Rátkai | 8 |
| (Germany) RWS | Porsche 911 GT2 | Porsche 3.6 L Turbo Flat-6 | | 79 | (Germany) Günther Blieninger | 8 |
| (Germany) RWS | Porsche 911 GT2 | Porsche 3.6 L Turbo Flat-6 | | 79 | (Austria) Hans-Jörg Hofer | 8 |
| (Germany) RWS | Porsche 911 GT2 | Porsche 3.6 L Turbo Flat-6 | | 79 | (Italy) Raffaele Sangiuolo | 8 |
| (United Kingdom) GP Motorsport | Saleen Mustang SR | Ford 5.9 L V8 | | 80 | (United Kingdom) Daniel Dror | 9–10 |
| (United Kingdom) GP Motorsport | Saleen Mustang SR | Ford 5.9 L V8 | | 80 | (United States) Simon Gregg | 9–10 |
| (United Kingdom) GP Motorsport | Saleen Mustang SR | Ford 5.9 L V8 | | 80 | (United Kingdom) Robert Schirle | 9 |
| (United Kingdom) GP Motorsport | Saleen Mustang SR | Ford 5.9 L V8 | | 80 | (United States) John Young | 10 |
| (Germany) Freisinger Motorsport | Porsche 911 GT2 | Porsche 3.6 L Turbo Flat-6 | | 81 | (Germany) Wolfgang Kaufmann | 7–10 |
| (Germany) Freisinger Motorsport | Porsche 911 GT2 | Porsche 3.6 L Turbo Flat-6 | | 81 | (France) Michel Ligonnet | 7–10 |
| (France) Larbre Compétition | Porsche 911 GT2 | Porsche 3.6 L Turbo Flat-6 | M | 86 | (France) Jack Leconte | 9–10 |
| (France) Larbre Compétition | Porsche 911 GT2 | Porsche 3.6 L Turbo Flat-6 | M | 86 | (France) Jean-Luc Chéreau | 9–10 |
| (United Kingdom) Cirtek Motorsport | Saleen Mustang SR; Porsche 911 GT2 | Ford 5.9 L V8; Porsche 3.6 L Turbo Flat-6 | D | 98 | (United Kingdom) David Warnock | 2, 7 |
| (United Kingdom) Cirtek Motorsport | Saleen Mustang SR; Porsche 911 GT2 | Ford 5.9 L V8; Porsche 3.6 L Turbo Flat-6 | D | 98 | (United Kingdom) Robert Schirle | 2 |
| (United Kingdom) Cirtek Motorsport | Saleen Mustang SR; Porsche 911 GT2 | Ford 5.9 L V8; Porsche 3.6 L Turbo Flat-6 | D | 98 | (Italy) Mauro Casadei | 3 |
| (United Kingdom) Cirtek Motorsport | Saleen Mustang SR; Porsche 911 GT2 | Ford 5.9 L V8; Porsche 3.6 L Turbo Flat-6 | D | 98 | (Italy) Andrea Garbagnati | 3 |
| (United Kingdom) Cirtek Motorsport | Saleen Mustang SR; Porsche 911 GT2 | Ford 5.9 L V8; Porsche 3.6 L Turbo Flat-6 | D | 98 | (Italy) Angelo Zadra | 3 |
| (United Kingdom) Cirtek Motorsport | Saleen Mustang SR; Porsche 911 GT2 | Ford 5.9 L V8; Porsche 3.6 L Turbo Flat-6 | D | 98 | (United Kingdom) Richard Nearn | 7 |
| (United Kingdom) Cirtek Motorsport | Saleen Mustang SR; Porsche 911 GT2 | Ford 5.9 L V8; Porsche 3.6 L Turbo Flat-6 | D | 98 | (Germany) Sascha Maassen | 7 |

== Results and standings ==
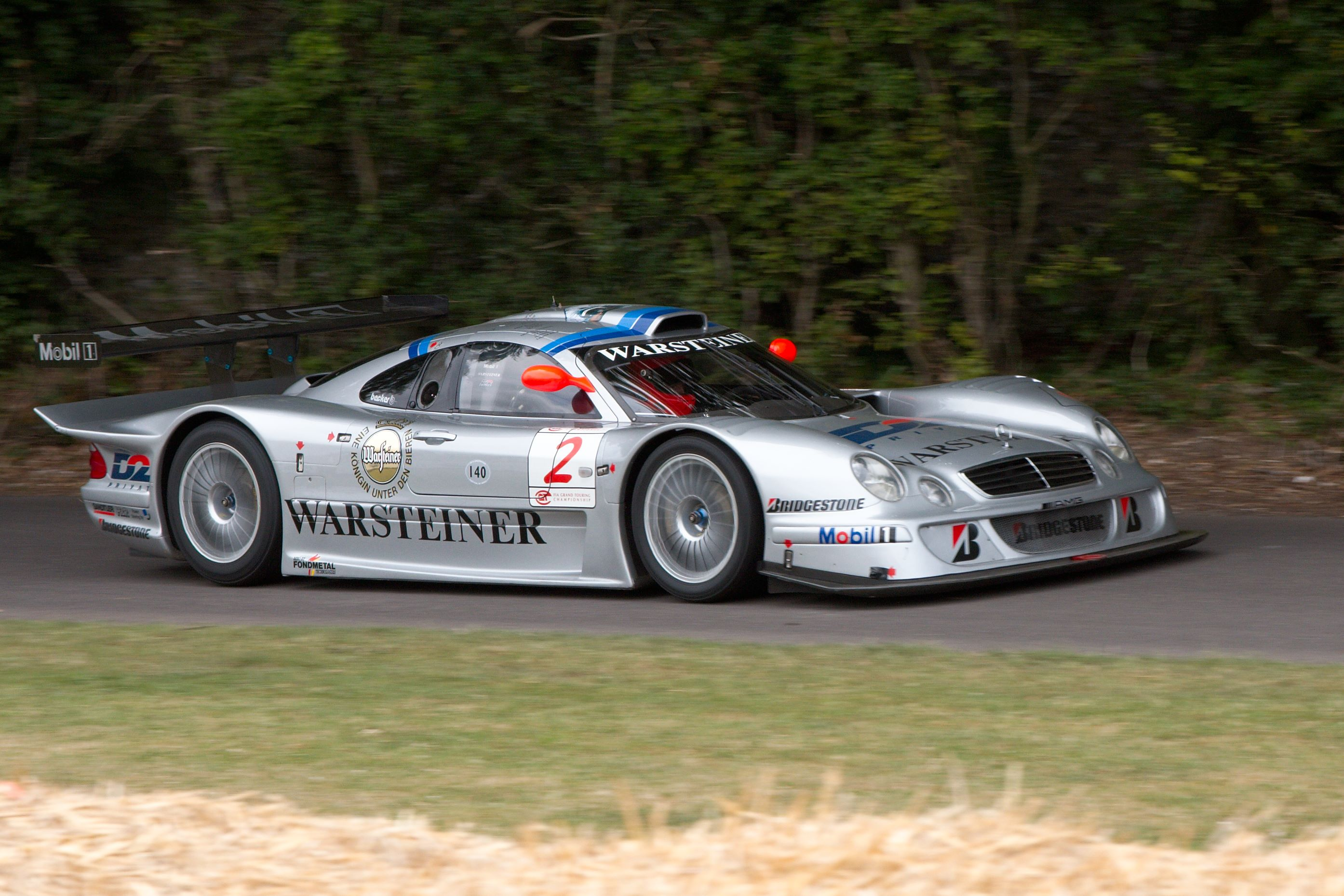
Mercedes-Benz won all ten races with the CLK GTR and CLK LM (pictured)

=== Race results ===
| Rnd | Circuit | GT1 Winning Team | GT2 Winning Team | Report |
| Rnd | Circuit | GT1 Winning Drivers | GT2 Winning Drivers | Report |
|---|---|---|---|---|
| 1 | Oschersleben | (Germany) No. 2 AMG Mercedes | (France) No. 51 Viper Team Oreca | Report |
| 1 | Oschersleben | (Germany) Klaus Ludwig (Brazil) Ricardo Zonta | (Monaco) Olivier Beretta (Portugal) Pedro Lamy | Report |
| 2 | Silverstone | (Germany) No. 1 AMG Mercedes | (France) No. 51 Viper Team Oreca | Report |
| 2 | Silverstone | (Germany) Bernd Schneider (Australia) Mark Webber | (Monaco) Olivier Beretta (Portugal) Pedro Lamy | Report |
| 3 | Hockenheimring | (Germany) No. 1 AMG Mercedes | (France) No. 51 Viper Team Oreca | Report |
| 3 | Hockenheimring | (Germany) Bernd Schneider (Australia) Mark Webber | (Monaco) Olivier Beretta (Portugal) Pedro Lamy | Report |
| 4 | Dijon | (Germany) No. 2 AMG Mercedes | (France) No. 51 Viper Team Oreca | Report |
| 4 | Dijon | (Germany) Klaus Ludwig (Brazil) Ricardo Zonta | (Monaco) Olivier Beretta (Portugal) Pedro Lamy | Report |
| 5 | Hungaroring | (Germany) No. 1 AMG Mercedes | (Germany) No. 57 Roock Racing | Report |
| 5 | Hungaroring | (Germany) Bernd Schneider (Australia) Mark Webber | (Germany) Sascha Maassen (Switzerland) Bruno Eichmann | Report |
| 6 | Suzuka | (Germany) No. 1 AMG Mercedes | (France) No. 51 Viper Team Oreca | Report |
| 6 | Suzuka | (Germany) Bernd Schneider (Australia) Mark Webber | (Monaco) Olivier Beretta (Portugal) Pedro Lamy (France) Dominique Dupuy | Report |
| 7 | Donington | (Germany) No. 1 AMG Mercedes | (France) No. 51 Viper Team Oreca | Report |
| 7 | Donington | (Germany) Bernd Schneider (Australia) Mark Webber | (Monaco) Olivier Beretta (Portugal) Pedro Lamy | Report |
| 8 | A1-Ring | (Germany) No. 2 AMG Mercedes | (France) No. 52 Viper Team Oreca | Report |
| 8 | A1-Ring | (Germany) Klaus Ludwig (Brazil) Ricardo Zonta | (Austria) Karl Wendlinger (United Kingdom) Justin Bell | Report |
| 9 | Homestead | (Germany) No. 2 AMG Mercedes | (France) No. 51 Viper Team Oreca | Report |
| 9 | Homestead | (Germany) Klaus Ludwig (Brazil) Ricardo Zonta | (Monaco) Olivier Beretta (Portugal) Pedro Lamy | Report |
| 10 | Laguna Seca | (Germany) No. 2 AMG Mercedes | (France) No. 51 Viper Team Oreca | Report |
| 10 | Laguna Seca | (Germany) Klaus Ludwig (Brazil) Ricardo Zonta | (Monaco) Olivier Beretta (Portugal) Pedro Lamy | Report |

Points were awarded to the top six finishers in each category. Entries were required to complete 75% of the race distance in order to be classified as a finisher. Drivers were required to complete 20% of the total race distance for their car to earn points. Teams scored points for all cars that finished a race.

Points system
| 1st | 2nd | 3rd | 4th | 5th | 6th |
|---|---|---|---|---|---|
| 10 | 6 | 4 | 3 | 2 | 1 |

=== Driver championships ===
==== GT1 ====
| Pos. | Driver | Team | OSC (Germany) | SIL (United Kingdom) | HOC (Germany) | DIJ (France) | HUN (Hungary) | SUZ (Japan) | DON (United Kingdom) | A1R (Austria) | HOM (United States) | LAG (United States) | Total points |
|---|---|---|---|---|---|---|---|---|---|---|---|---|---|
| 1 | (Germany) Klaus Ludwig | (Germany) AMG Mercedes | 1 | 4 | 2 | 1 | 2 | 2 | 2 | 1 | 1 | 1 | 77 |
| 1 | (Brazil) Ricardo Zonta | (Germany) AMG Mercedes | 1 | 4 | 2 | 1 | 2 | 2 | 2 | 1 | 1 | 1 | 77 |
| 2 | (Germany) Bernd Schneider | (Germany) AMG Mercedes | 3 | 1 | 1 | 9 | 1 | 1 | 1 | 2 | 4 | 2 | 69 |
| 2 | (Australia) Mark Webber | (Germany) AMG Mercedes | 3 | 1 | 1 | 9 | 1 | 1 | 1 | 2 | 4 | 2 | 69 |
| 3 | (United Kingdom) Allan McNish | (Germany) Porsche AG | 7 | Ret | 6 | 2 | 3 | 3 | 3 | 3 | 3 | Ret | 27 |
| 3 | (France) Yannick Dalmas | (Germany) Porsche AG | 7 | | 6 | 2 | 3 | 3 | 3 | 3 | 3 | Ret | 27 |
| 4 | (Germany) Jörg Müller | (Germany) Porsche AG | 8 | 2 | 8 | 11 | 4 | Ret | 4 | 8 | 2 | 3 | 22 |
| 5 | (Germany) Uwe Alzen | (Germany) Porsche AG | 8 | 2 | 8 | 11 | | Ret | 4 | 8 | 2 | 3 | 19 |
| 6 | (Germany) Marcel Tiemann | (Germany) Team Persson Motorsport | 2 | Ret | 4 | 5 | Ret | 7 | 5 | 5 | 5 | 7 | 17 |
| 6 | (France) Jean-Marc Gounon | (Germany) Team Persson Motorsport | 2 | Ret | 4 | 5 | Ret | 7 | 5 | 5 | 5 | 7 | 17 |
| 7 | (Australia) David Brabham | (France) DAMS | 5 | 8 | 3 | 3 | 6 | | Ret | | 6 | 4 | 15 |
| 7 | (France) Éric Bernard | (France) DAMS | 5 | 8 | 3 | 3 | 6 | | Ret | | 6 | 4 | 15 |
| 8 | (Germany) Michael Bartels | (Germany) Zakspeed Racing | 6 | 3 | 7 | 6 | 5 | 6 | NC | 4 | 7 | 5 | 14 |
| 9 | (Germany) Armin Hahne | (Germany) Zakspeed Racing | 6 | 3 | 7 | 6 | 5 | 8 | 6 | 9 | DNS | | 9 |
| 10 | (France) Christophe Bouchut | (Germany) Team Persson Motorsport | Ret | 7 | 10 | 4 | DNS | 4 | 8 | 10 | Ret | 6 | 7 |
| 10 | (Germany) Bernd Mayländer | (Germany) Team Persson Motorsport | Ret | 7 | 10 | 4 | DNS | 4 | 8 | 10 | Ret | 6 | 7 |
| 11 | (Germany) Andreas Scheld | (Germany) Zakspeed Racing | 4 | 5 | Ret | 7 | Ret | 6 | 6 | 9 | DNS | | 7 |
| 12 | (Germany) Alexander Grau | (Germany) Zakspeed Racing | 4 | 5 | Ret | 7 | Ret | 6 | | | | | 6 |
| 13 | (Italy) Max Angelelli | (Germany) Zakspeed Racing | | | | | | | NC | 4 | 7 | 5 | 5 |
| 14 | (Monaco) Stéphane Ortelli | (Germany) Porsche AG | | | | | | 3 | | | | | 4 |
| 15 | (United Kingdom) Geoff Lees | (United Kingdom) Davidoff Classic | Ret | 6 | 5 | | Ret | Ret | 7 | 6 | | | 4 |
| 15 | (Germany) Thomas Bscher | (United Kingdom) Davidoff Classic | Ret | 6 | 5 | | Ret | Ret | 7 | 6 | | | 4 |
| 16 | (France) Bob Wollek | (Germany) Porsche AG | | Ret | | | 4 | Ret | | | | | 3 |
| 16 | (France) Bob Wollek | (France) Larbre Compétition | | | | 8 | | | | | | | 3 |
| 17 | (France) Christophe Tinseau | (France) DAMS | | | | | | 5 | | 7 | | | 2 |
| 17 | (France) Franck Lagorce | (France) DAMS | | | | | | 5 | | 7 | | | 2 |
| 18 | (United States) Johnny O'Connell | (France) DAMS | | | | | | 5 | | | | | 2 |
| - | (France) Patrice Goueslard | (France) Larbre Compétition | | | | 8 | Ret | | | | | | 0 |
| - | (Sweden) Carl Rosenblad | (France) Larbre Compétition | | | | 8 | | | | | | | 0 |
| - | (France) Fabien Giroix | (Germany) Zakspeed Racing | | | | | | 8 | | | | | 0 |
| - | (Switzerland) Jean-Denis Délétraz | (Germany) Zakspeed Racing | | | | | | 8 | | | | | 0 |
| - | (France) Jean-Luc Maury-Laribière | (France) Parabolica Motorsports | | Ret | 9 | 10 | | | | | | | 0 |
| - | (France) Patrick Caternet | (France) Parabolica Motorsports | | Ret | 9 | 10 | | | | | | | 0 |
| - | (Germany) Steffen Widmann | (France) Parabolica Motorsports | | | 9 | | | | | | | | 0 |
| - | (Netherlands) Mike Hezemans | (Netherlands) Team Hezemans | WD | Ret | DNS | | | | | | | | 0 |
| - | (Netherlands) Jan Lammers | (Netherlands) Team Hezemans | WD | Ret | DNS | | | | | | | | 0 |
| - | (Germany) Rainer Bonnetsmüller | (Netherlands) Team Hezemans | WD | Ret | DNS | | | | | | | | 0 |
| - | (Austria) Manfred Jurasz | (Netherlands) Team Hezemans | WD | Ret | DNS | | | | | | | | 0 |
| - | (Germany) Stefan Hackl | (Netherlands) Team Hezemans | | Ret | | | | | | | | | 0 |
| - | (France) Jack Leconte | (France) Larbre Compétition | | | | | Ret | | | | | | 0 |
| - | (France) Jean-Luc Chéreau | (France) Larbre Compétition | | | | | Ret | | | | | | 0 |
| - | (Germany) Michael Fielder | (Netherlands) Team Hezemans | | | DNS | | | | | | | | 0 |
| Pos. | Driver | Team | OSC (Germany) | SIL (United Kingdom) | HOC (Germany) | DIJ (France) | HUN (Hungary) | SUZ (Japan) | DON (United Kingdom) | A1R (Austria) | HOM (United States) | LAG (United States) | Total points |

| Colour | Result |
|---|---|
| Gold | Winner |
| Silver | Second place |
| Bronze | Third place |
| Green | Points classification |
| Blue | Non-points classification |
| Blue | Non-classified finish (NC) |
| Purple | Retired, not classified (Ret) |
| Red | Did not qualify (DNQ) |
| Red | Did not pre-qualify (DNPQ) |
| Black | Disqualified (DSQ) |
| White | Did not start (DNS) |
| White | Withdrew (WD) |
| White | Race cancelled (C) |
| Blank | Did not practice (DNP) |
| Blank | Did not arrive (DNA) |
| Blank | Excluded (EX) |

==== GT2 ====
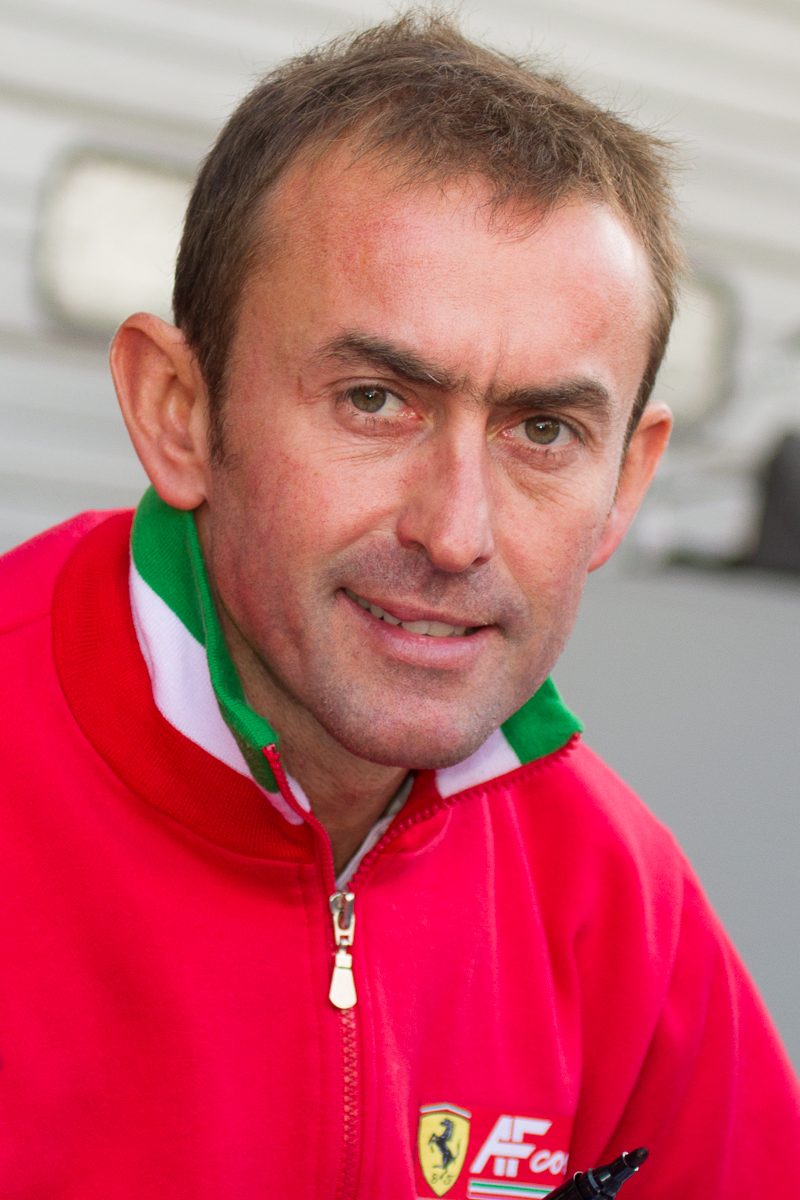
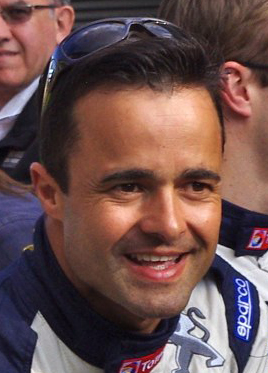
Olivier Beretta and Pedro Lamy won the GT2 Drivers' Championship for Viper Team Oreca with eight victories

| Pos. | Driver | Team | OSC (Germany) | SIL (United Kingdom) | HOC (Germany) | DIJ (France) | HUN (Hungary) | SUZ (Japan) | DON (United Kingdom) | A1R (Austria) | HOM (United States) | LAG (United States) | Total points |
|---|---|---|---|---|---|---|---|---|---|---|---|---|---|
| 1 | (Monaco) Olivier Beretta | (France) Viper Team Oreca | 1 | 1 | 1 | 1 | 2 | 1 | 1 | 2 | 1 | 1 | 92 |
| 1 | (Portugal) Pedro Lamy | (France) Viper Team Oreca | 1 | 1 | 1 | 1 | 2 | 1 | 1 | 2 | 1 | 1 | 92 |
| 2 | (Austria) Karl Wendlinger | (France) Viper Team Oreca | 2 | Ret | 2 | 2 | Ret | 2 | 3 | 1 | Ret | DNS | 38 |
| 3 | (Switzerland) Bruno Eichmann | (Germany) Roock Racing | DSQ | Ret | 3 | 5 | 1 | Ret | 12 | 9 | 12 | 2 | 22 |
| 4 | (United Kingdom) Justin Bell | (France) Viper Team Oreca | | Ret | | | | 2 | 3 | 1 | | | 20 |
| 5 | (Austria) Franz Konrad | (Germany) Konrad Motorsport | 3 | 7 | 11 | 4 | DNS | 4 | 2 | 3 | Ret | Ret | 20 |
| 6 | (United States) David Donohue | (France) Viper Team Oreca | 2 | | 2 | 2 | | | | | Ret | DNS | 18 |
| 7 | (Germany) Sascha Maassen | (Germany) Roock Racing | DSQ | Ret | 3 | 5 | 1 | Ret | | | | | 17 |
| 7 | (Germany) Sascha Maassen | (United Kingdom) Cirtek Motorsport | | | | | | | 10 | | | | 17 |
| 7 | (Germany) Sascha Maassen | (Germany) Roock Sportsystem | | | | | | | | 6 | | | 17 |
| 8 | (Germany) Gerd Ruch | (Switzerland) Elf Haberthur Racing | 7 | 2 | 5 | 15 | 4 | 5 | Ret | 8 | Ret | 5 | 15 |
| 8 | (Belgium) Michel Neugarten | (Switzerland) Elf Haberthur Racing | 7 | 2 | 5 | 15 | 4 | 5 | Ret | 8 | Ret | 5 | 15 |
| 9 | (Germany) Michael Trunk | (Germany) Krauss Race Sports International | 5 | 8 | 13 | 6 | 5 | | 7 | 5 | 4 | 3 | 14 |
| 9 | (Germany) Bernhard Müller | (Germany) Krauss Race Sports International | 5 | 8 | 13 | 6 | 5 | | 7 | 5 | 4 | 3 | 14 |
| 10 | (Germany) Altfrid Heger | (Germany) Konrad Motorsport | | | | | DNS | 4 | 2 | 3 | | | 13 |
| 11 | (Netherlands) Cor Euser | (Netherlands) Marcos Racing International | 6 | Ret | Ret | Ret | 3 | 3 | DSQ | Ret | 3 | Ret | 13 |
| 11 | (Germany) Harald Becker | (Netherlands) Marcos Racing International | 6 | Ret | Ret | Ret | 3 | 3 | DSQ | Ret | 3 | Ret | 13 |
| 12 | (Italy) Marco Spinelli | (Switzerland) Elf Haberthur Racing | 7 | 2 | 5 | 15 | 4 | | Ret | 8 | | | 11 |
| 13 | (France) Dominique Dupuy | (France) Viper Team Oreca | | | | | | 1 | | | | | 10 |
| 14 | (Germany) Claudia Hürtgen | (Germany) Roock Racing | Ret | Ret | 4 | 7 | DNS | 7 | 13 | 13 | 2 | Ret | 9 |
| 15 | (Monaco) Stéphane Ortelli | (Germany) Roock Racing | Ret | Ret | 4 | | DNS | | 13 | 13 | 2 | Ret | 9 |
| 16 | (France) Michel Ligonnet | (Switzerland) Elf Haberthur Racing | | | | | | 5 | | | | | 9 |
| 16 | (France) Michel Ligonnet | (Germany) Freisinger Motorsport | | | | | | | 4 | 4 | 6 | Ret | 9 |
| 17 | (United Kingdom) Christian Vann | (Netherlands) Marcos Racing International | | | Ret | Ret | | 3 | DSQ | Ret | 3 | Ret | 8 |
| 18 | (Germany) Wolfgang Kaufmann | (Germany) Freisinger Motorsport | | | | | | | 4 | 4 | 6 | Ret | 7 |
| 19 | (Germany) André Ahrlé | (Germany) Roock Sportsystem | 9 | 10 | 14 | 10 | 6 | Ret | | 6 | 5 | 4 | 7 |
| 19 | (Germany) André Ahrlé | (Germany) Roock Racing | | | | | | | 12 | | | | 7 |
| 20 | (Netherlands) Mike Hezemans | (Germany) Roock Racing | | | | | | 7 | 12 | 9 | 12 | 2 | 6 |
| 21 | (Japan) Hideshi Matsuda | (France) Viper Team Oreca | | | | | | 2 | | | | | 6 |
| 22 | (France) Stéphane Sallaz | (Germany) Konrad Motorsport | | | | 4 | | 4 | | | | | 6 |
| 23 | (Switzerland) Uwe Sick | (Switzerland) Stadler Motorsport | 10 | 3 | 6 | 9 | 8 | Ret | Ret | Ret | DNS | Ret | 5 |
| 23 | (Germany) Axel Röhr | (Switzerland) Stadler Motorsport | 10 | 3 | 6 | 9 | 8 | | Ret | Ret | DNS | Ret | 5 |
| 24 | (United Kingdom) Martin Stretton | (Germany) Konrad Motorsport | 4 | 9 | 7 | 15 | Ret | Ret | 5 | 7 | 7 | 10 | 5 |
| 24 | (Switzerland) Toni Seiler | (Germany) Konrad Motorsport | 4 | 9 | 7 | 15 | Ret | | 5 | 7 | 7 | 10 | 5 |
| 25 | (United States) Nick Ham | (Germany) Konrad Motorsport | 3 | 7 | 11 | | | | | | | | 4 |
| 26 | (France) Jean-Pierre Jarier | (France) Sonauto Levallois | | | | 3 | | | | | | | 4 |
| 26 | (France) François Lafon | (France) Sonauto Levallois | | | | 3 | | | | | | | 4 |
| 27 | (United States) Matt Turner | (United Kingdom) Chamberlain Engineering | Ret | 5 | | | | 6 | 6 | | | | 4 |
| 28 | (Germany) Gerold Ried | (Germany) Proton Competition | 12 | 4 | Ret | 12 | 9 | 9 | 9 | Ret | Ret | 7 | 3 |
| 28 | (France) Patrick Vuillaume | (Germany) Proton Competition | 12 | 4 | Ret | 12 | 9 | 9 | 9 | Ret | Ret | 7 | 3 |
| 29 | (United Kingdom) Rob Schirle | (United Kingdom) Cirtek Motorsport | | Ret | | | | | | | | | 3 |
| 29 | (United Kingdom) Rob Schirle | (United Kingdom) GP Motorsport | | | | | | | | | DNS | | 3 |
| 29 | (United Kingdom) Rob Schirle | (Germany) Roock Sportsystem | | | | | | | | | | 4 | 3 |
| 29 | (Germany) Dirk Layer | (Germany) Roock Sportsystem | | | | | | | | | | 4 | 3 |
| 30 | (Netherlands) Hans Hugenholtz Jr. | (United Kingdom) Chamberlain Engineering | | 5 | | | | 6 | | | Ret | 8 | 3 |
| 31 | (United States) Zak Brown | (Switzerland) Elf Haberthur Racing | | | | | | | | | Ret | 5 | 2 |
| 31 | (United States) Andy Pilgrim | (Germany) Roock Sportsystem | | | | | | | | | 5 | | 2 |
| 32 | (Portugal) Ni Amorim | (United Kingdom) Chamberlain Engineering | 8 | 6 | Ret | 11 | DNS | | 6 | Ret | Ret | 8 | 2 |
| 33 | (Portugal) Gonçalo Gomes | (United Kingdom) Chamberlain Engineering | 8 | 6 | Ret | | | | | | | | 1 |
| 34 | (Thailand) Ratanakul Prutirat | (Germany) Roock Sportsystem | 9 | | 14 | 10 | 6 | Ret | | | | | 1 |
| 35 | (Japan) Hiroshi Sakai | (United Kingdom) Chamberlain Engineering | | | | | | 6 | | | | | 1 |
| 35 | (United Kingdom) Martin Short | (United Kingdom) Chamberlain Engineering | | | | | | | 6 | | | | 1 |
| 35 | (United States) Simon Gregg | (United Kingdom) GP Motorsport | | | | | | | | | DNS | 6 | 1 |
| 35 | (United Kingdom) Daniel Dror | (United Kingdom) GP Motorsport | | | | | | | | | DNS | 6 | 1 |
| 35 | (United States) John Young | (United Kingdom) GP Motorsport | | | | | | | | | | 6 | 1 |
| Pos. | Driver | Team | OSC (Germany) | SIL (United Kingdom) | HOC (Germany) | DIJ (France) | HUN (Hungary) | SUZ (Japan) | DON (United Kingdom) | A1R (Austria) | HOM (United States) | LAG (United States) | Total points |

=== Team championships ===
==== GT1 ====
| Pos. | Team | OSC (Germany) | SIL (United Kingdom) | HOC (Germany) | DIJ (France) | HUN (Hungary) | SUZ (Japan) | DON (United Kingdom) | A1R (Austria) | HOM (United States) | LAG (United States) | Total points |
|---|---|---|---|---|---|---|---|---|---|---|---|---|
| 1 | (Germany) AMG Mercedes | 1 | 1 | 1 | 1 | 1 | 1 | 1 | 1 | 1 | 1 | 146 |
| 1 | (Germany) AMG Mercedes | 3 | 4 | 2 | 9 | 2 | 2 | 2 | 2 | 4 | 2 | 146 |
| 2 | (Germany) Porsche AG | 7 | 2 | 6 | 2 | 3 | 3 | 3 | 3 | 2 | 3 | 49 |
| 2 | (Germany) Porsche AG | 8 | Ret | 8 | 11 | 4 | Ret | 4 | 8 | 3 | Ret | 49 |
| 3 | (Germany) Team Persson Motorsport | 2 | 7 | 4 | 4 | Ret | 4 | 5 | 5 | 5 | 6 | 24 |
| 3 | (Germany) Team Persson Motorsport | Ret | Ret | 10 | 5 | DNS | 7 | 8 | 10 | Ret | 7 | 24 |
| 4 | (Germany) Zakspeed Racing | 4 | 3 | 7 | 6 | 5 | 6 | 6 | 4 | 7 | 5 | 20 |
| 4 | (Germany) Zakspeed Racing | 6 | 5 | Ret | 7 | Ret | 8 | NC | 9 | DNS | | 20 |
| 5 | (France) DAMS | 5 | 8 | 3 | 3 | 6 | 5 | Ret | 7 | 6 | 4 | 17 |
| 6 | (United Kingdom) Davidoff Classic | Ret | 6 | 5 | | Ret | Ret | 7 | 6 | | | 4 |
| – | (France) Larbre Compétition | | | | 8 | Ret | | | | | | 0 |
| – | (France) Parabolica Motorsports | WD | Ret | 9 | 10 | | | | | | | 0 |
| – | (Netherlands) Team Hezemans | WD | Ret | DNS | | | | | | | | 0 |
| – | (Netherlands) Team Hezemans | WD | Ret | DNS | | | | | | | | 0 |

| Colour | Result |
|---|---|
| Gold | Winner |
| Silver | Second place |
| Bronze | Third place |
| Green | Points classification |
| Blue | Non-points classification |
| Blue | Non-classified finish (NC) |
| Purple | Retired, not classified (Ret) |
| Red | Did not qualify (DNQ) |
| Red | Did not pre-qualify (DNPQ) |
| Black | Disqualified (DSQ) |
| White | Did not start (DNS) |
| White | Withdrew (WD) |
| White | Race cancelled (C) |
| Blank | Did not practice (DNP) |
| Blank | Did not arrive (DNA) |
| Blank | Excluded (EX) |

==== GT2 ====
| Pos. | Team | OSC (Germany) | SIL (United Kingdom) | HOC (Germany) | DIJ (France) | HUN (Hungary) | SUZ (Japan) | DON (United Kingdom) | A1R (Austria) | HOM (United States) | LAG (United States) | Total points |
|---|---|---|---|---|---|---|---|---|---|---|---|---|
| 1 | (France) Viper Team Oreca | 1 | 1 | 1 | 1 | 2 | 1 | 1 | 1 | 1 | 1 | 130 |
| 1 | (France) Viper Team Oreca | 2 | Ret | 2 | 2 | Ret | 2 | 3 | 2 | Ret | DNS | 130 |
| 2 | (Germany) Roock Racing | Ret | Ret | 3 | 5 | 1 | 7 | 12 | 9 | 2 | 2 | 31 |
| 2 | (Germany) Roock Racing | DSQ | Ret | 4 | 7 | DNS | Ret | 13 | 13 | 12 | Ret | 31 |
| 3 | (Germany) Konrad Motorsport | 3 | 7 | 7 | 4 | Ret | 4 | 2 | 3 | 7 | 10 | 25 |
| 3 | (Germany) Konrad Motorsport | 4 | 9 | 11 | 15 | DNS | Ret | 5 | 7 | Ret | Ret | 25 |
| 4 | (Switzerland) Elf Haberthur Racing | 7 | 2 | 5 | 13 | 4 | 5 | 11 | 8 | 9 | 5 | 15 |
| 4 | (Switzerland) Elf Haberthur Racing | Ret | | 9 | 14 | Ret | 10 | Ret | 11 | Ret | Ret | 15 |
| 5 | (Germany) Krauss Race Sports International | 5 | 8 | 13 | 6 | 5 | | 7 | 5 | 4 | 3 | 14 |
| 6 | (Netherlands) Marcos Racing International | 6 | Ret | Ret | Ret | 3 | 3 | DSQ | Ret | 3 | Ret | 13 |
| 6 | (Netherlands) Marcos Racing International | | | | | | | | | 13 | Ret | 13 |
| 7 | (Germany) Freisinger Motorsport | | | | | | | 4 | 4 | 6 | Ret | 7 |
| 8 | (Germany) Roock Sportsystem | 9 | 10 | 14 | 10 | 6 | Ret | DSQ | 6 | 5 | 4 | 7 |
| 9 | (Switzerland) Stadler Motorsport | 10 | 3 | 6 | 9 | 8 | Ret | Ret | Ret | DNS | Ret | 5 |
| 10 | (United Kingdom) Chamberlain Engineering | 8 | 5 | Ret | 11 | DNS | 6 | 6 | Ret | Ret | 8 | 5 |
| 10 | (United Kingdom) Chamberlain Engineering | Ret | 6 | | | | | | | | | 5 |
| 11 | (France) Sonauto Levallois | | | | 3 | | | | | | | 4 |
| 12 | (Germany) Proton Competition | 11 | 4 | 8 | 8 | 9 | 9 | 8 | 12 | Ret | 7 | 3 |
| 12 | (Germany) Proton Competition | 12 | Ret | Ret | 12 | 10 | | 9 | Ret | | | 3 |
| 13 | (United Kingdom) GP Motorsport | | | | | | | | | DNS | 6 | 1 |
| – | (Germany) Seikel Motorsport | | | 12 | Ret | 7 | 8 | Ret | Ret | 8 | 9 | 0 |
| – | (Germany) Seikel Motorsport | | | | | | 11 | | | 10 | Ret | 0 |
| – | (United Kingdom) Cirtek Motorsport | | Ret | 10 | | | | 10 | | | | 0 |
| – | (Germany) RWS | | | | | | | | 10 | | | 0 |
| – | (France) Larbre Compétition | | | | | | | | | 11 | Ret | 0 |
| – | (Hungary) Bovi Motorsport | | | | | Ret | | | Ret | | | 0 |
| – | (France) Paul Belmondo Racing | | | Ret | | | | | | | | 0 |
| – | (Germany) Remus Racing | | | | | | | | Ret | | | 0 |
| – | (Switzerland) Swiss Team Salamin | | | DNS | | | | | | | | 0 |
| – | (United States) Saleen-Allen Speedlab | | | | | | | | | | DNS | 0 |

== Bibliography ==
- Upietz, Ulrich (1998). Porsche GT1: Der Erfolgstyp 1997/1998 (in English and German). Duisburg: Gruppe C Motorsport Verlag. pp. 130–175. ISBN 978-3928540162.

== See also ==
- GTR Euroseries
