= 1998 FIA GT Budapest 500 km =

Layout of the Hungaroring (1989–2002)

The 1998 FIA GT Budapest 500 km was the fifth round the 1998 FIA GT Championship season. It took place at the Hungaroring, Hungary, on July 19, 1998.

Due to a large accident on the first lap, the race was red flagged. The initial start was nullified and the race was restarted, running for its full original distance. Four cars which were damaged in the initial accident did not take the restart.

== Official results ==
Class winners are in bold. Cars failing to complete 70% of winner's distance are marked as Not Classified (NC).

Pos	Class	No	Team	Drivers	Chassis	Tyre	Laps
Pos	Class	No	Team	Drivers	Engine	Tyre	Laps
1	**GT1**	**1**	**(Germany) AMG Mercedes**	**(Germany) Bernd Schneider (Australia) Mark Webber**	**Mercedes-Benz CLK LM**	**B**	**126**
1	**GT1**	**1**	**(Germany) AMG Mercedes**	**(Germany) Bernd Schneider (Australia) Mark Webber**	**Mercedes-Benz M119 6.0L V8**	**B**	**126**
2	GT1	2	(Germany) AMG Mercedes	(Germany) Klaus Ludwig (Brazil) Ricardo Zonta	Mercedes-Benz CLK LM	**B**	126
2	GT1	2	(Germany) AMG Mercedes	(Germany) Klaus Ludwig (Brazil) Ricardo Zonta	Mercedes-Benz M119 6.0L V8	**B**	126
3	GT1	7	(Germany) Porsche AG	(France) Yannick Dalmas (United Kingdom) Allan McNish	Porsche 911 GT1-98	**MI**	126
3	GT1	7	(Germany) Porsche AG	(France) Yannick Dalmas (United Kingdom) Allan McNish	Porsche 3.2L Turbo Flat-6	**MI**	126
4	GT1	8	(Germany) Porsche AG	(France) Bob Wollek (Germany) Jörg Müller	Porsche 911 GT1-98	**MI**	125
4	GT1	8	(Germany) Porsche AG	(France) Bob Wollek (Germany) Jörg Müller	Porsche 3.2L Turbo Flat-6	**MI**	125
5	GT1	6	(Germany) Zakspeed Racing	(Germany) Michael Bartels (Germany) Armin Hahne	Porsche 911 GT1-98	**P**	121
5	GT1	6	(Germany) Zakspeed Racing	(Germany) Michael Bartels (Germany) Armin Hahne	Porsche 3.2L Turbo Flat-6	**P**	121
6	**GT2**	**57**	**(Germany) Roock Racing**	**(Germany) Sascha Maassen (Switzerland) Bruno Eichmann**	**Porsche 911 GT2**	**Y**	**113**
6	**GT2**	**57**	**(Germany) Roock Racing**	**(Germany) Sascha Maassen (Switzerland) Bruno Eichmann**	**Porsche 3.6L Turbo Flat-6**	**Y**	**113**
7	GT2	51	(France) Viper Team Oreca	(Monaco) Olivier Beretta (Portugal) Pedro Lamy	Chrysler Viper GTS-R	**MI**	113
7	GT2	51	(France) Viper Team Oreca	(Monaco) Olivier Beretta (Portugal) Pedro Lamy	Chrysler 8.0L V10	**MI**	113
8	GT2	70	(Netherlands) Marcos Racing International	(United Kingdom) Christian Vann (Germany) Harald Becker (Netherlands) Cor Euser	Marcos LM600	**D**	113
8	GT2	70	(Netherlands) Marcos Racing International	(United Kingdom) Christian Vann (Germany) Harald Becker (Netherlands) Cor Euser	Chevrolet 5.9L V8	**D**	113
9	GT2	60	(Switzerland) Elf Haberthur Racing	(Belgium) Michel Neugarten (Germany) Gerd Ruch (Italy) Marco Spinelli	Porsche 911 GT2	**G**	109
9	GT2	60	(Switzerland) Elf Haberthur Racing	(Belgium) Michel Neugarten (Germany) Gerd Ruch (Italy) Marco Spinelli	Porsche 3.6L Turbo Flat-6	**G**	109
10	GT2	63	(Germany) Krauss Race Sports International	(Germany) Michael Trunk (Germany) Bernhard Müller	Porsche 911 GT2	**D**	109
10	GT2	63	(Germany) Krauss Race Sports International	(Germany) Michael Trunk (Germany) Bernhard Müller	Porsche 3.6L Turbo Flat-6	**D**	109
11	GT2	58	(Germany) Roock Sportsystem	(Germany) André Ahrlé (Thailand) Ratanakul Prutirat	Porsche 911 GT2	**Y**	108
11	GT2	58	(Germany) Roock Sportsystem	(Germany) André Ahrlé (Thailand) Ratanakul Prutirat	Porsche 3.6L Turbo Flat-6	**Y**	108
12	GT2	76	(Germany) Seikel Motorsport	(Germany) Ernst Palmberger (United Kingdom) Nigel Smith (United Kingdom) Robert Nearn	Porsche 911 GT2	**P**	108
12	GT2	76	(Germany) Seikel Motorsport	(Germany) Ernst Palmberger (United Kingdom) Nigel Smith (United Kingdom) Robert Nearn	Porsche 3.6L Turbo Flat-6	**P**	108
13	GT2	62	(Switzerland) Stadler Motorsport	(Germany) Axel Röhr (Switzerland) Uwe Sick	Porsche 911 GT2	**P**	105
13	GT2	62	(Switzerland) Stadler Motorsport	(Germany) Axel Röhr (Switzerland) Uwe Sick	Porsche 3.6L Turbo Flat-6	**P**	105
14	GT2	69	(Germany) Proton Competition	(Germany) Gerold Ried (France) Patrick Vuillaume	Porsche 911 GT2	**P**	104
14	GT2	69	(Germany) Proton Competition	(Germany) Gerold Ried (France) Patrick Vuillaume	Porsche 3.6L Turbo Flat-6	**P**	104
15	GT2	96	(Germany) Proton Competition	(Austria) Horst Felbermayr Sr. (Austria) Horst Felbermayr Jr.	Porsche 911 GT2	**P**	104
15	GT2	96	(Germany) Proton Competition	(Austria) Horst Felbermayr Sr. (Austria) Horst Felbermayr Jr.	Porsche 3.6L Turbo Flat-6	**P**	104
16	GT1	3	(France) DAMS	(France) Éric Bernard (Australia) David Brabham	Panoz GTR-1	**MI**	97
16	GT1	3	(France) DAMS	(France) Éric Bernard (Australia) David Brabham	Ford (Roush) 6.0L V8	**MI**	97
17 DNF	GT1	5	(Germany) Zakspeed Racing	(Germany) Alexander Grau (Germany) Andreas Scheld	Porsche 911 GT1-98	**P**	87
17 DNF	GT1	5	(Germany) Zakspeed Racing	(Germany) Alexander Grau (Germany) Andreas Scheld	Porsche 3.2L Turbo Flat-6	**P**	87
18 DNF	GT2	61	(Switzerland) Elf Haberthur Racing	(Germany) Kersten Jodexnis (Italy) Mauro Casadei (Switzerland) Dieter Fähler	Porsche 911 GT2	**G**	78
18 DNF	GT2	61	(Switzerland) Elf Haberthur Racing	(Germany) Kersten Jodexnis (Italy) Mauro Casadei (Switzerland) Dieter Fähler	Porsche 3.6L Turbo Flat-6	**G**	78
19 DNF	GT1	15	(United Kingdom) Davidoff Classic (United Kingdom) GTC Competition	(United Kingdom) Geoff Lees (Germany) Thomas Bscher	McLaren F1 GTR	**G**	68
19 DNF	GT1	15	(United Kingdom) Davidoff Classic (United Kingdom) GTC Competition	(United Kingdom) Geoff Lees (Germany) Thomas Bscher	BMW S70 6.0L V12	**G**	68
20 DNF	GT2	78	(Hungary) Bovi Motorsport	(Hungary) Attila Barta (Hungary) Kálmán Bódis (Austria) Herbert Jerish	Porsche 911 GT2	?	66
20 DNF	GT2	78	(Hungary) Bovi Motorsport	(Hungary) Attila Barta (Hungary) Kálmán Bódis (Austria) Herbert Jerish	Porsche 3.6L Turbo Flat-6	?	66
21 DNF	GT2	52	(France) Viper Team Oreca	(Austria) Karl Wendlinger (Belgium) Marc Duez	Chrysler Viper GTS-R	**MI**	50
21 DNF	GT2	52	(France) Viper Team Oreca	(Austria) Karl Wendlinger (Belgium) Marc Duez	Chrysler 8.0L V10	**MI**	50
22 DNF	GT1	12	(Germany) Team Persson Motorsport	(France) Jean-Marc Gounon (Germany) Marcel Tiemann	Mercedes-Benz CLK GTR	**B**	39
22 DNF	GT1	12	(Germany) Team Persson Motorsport	(France) Jean-Marc Gounon (Germany) Marcel Tiemann	Mercedes-Benz M120 6.0L V12	**B**	39
23 DNF	GT2	65	(Germany) Konrad Motorsport	(United Kingdom) Martin Stretton (Switzerland) Toni Seiler	Porsche 911 GT2	**D**	15
23 DNF	GT2	65	(Germany) Konrad Motorsport	(United Kingdom) Martin Stretton (Switzerland) Toni Seiler	Porsche 3.6L Turbo Flat-6	**D**	15
24 DNF	GT1	17	(France) Larbre Compétition	(France) Patrice Goueslard (France) Jack Leconte (France) Jean-Luc Chéreau	Porsche 911 GT1 Evo	**MI**	9
24 DNF	GT1	17	(France) Larbre Compétition	(France) Patrice Goueslard (France) Jack Leconte (France) Jean-Luc Chéreau	Porsche 3.2L Turbo Flat-6	**MI**	9
DNS	GT1	11	(Germany) Team Persson Motorsport	(France) Christophe Bouchut (Germany) Bernd Mayländer	Mercedes-Benz CLK GTR	**B**	–
DNS	GT1	11	(Germany) Team Persson Motorsport	(France) Christophe Bouchut (Germany) Bernd Mayländer	Mercedes-Benz M120 6.0L V12	**B**	–
DNS	GT2	53	(United Kingdom) Chamberlain Engineering	(Portugal) Ni Amorim (United Kingdom) Gary Ayles	Chrysler Viper GTS-R	**D**	–
DNS	GT2	53	(United Kingdom) Chamberlain Engineering	(Portugal) Ni Amorim (United Kingdom) Gary Ayles	Chrysler 8.0L V10	**D**	–
DNS	GT2	56	(Germany) Roock Racing	(Germany) Claudia Hürtgen (France) Stéphane Ortelli	Porsche 911 GT2	**Y**	–
DNS	GT2	56	(Germany) Roock Racing	(Germany) Claudia Hürtgen (France) Stéphane Ortelli	Porsche 3.6L Turbo Flat-6	**Y**	–
DNS	GT2	66	(Germany) Konrad Motorsport	(Germany) Altfrid Heger (Austria) Franz Konrad	Porsche 911 GT2	**D**	–
DNS	GT2	66	(Germany) Konrad Motorsport	(Germany) Altfrid Heger (Austria) Franz Konrad	Porsche 3.6L Turbo Flat-6	**D**	–

== Statistics ==
- Pole position – #1 AMG Mercedes – 1:28.562
- Fastest lap – #2 AMG Mercedes – 1:32.300
- Average speed – 149.062 km/h

FIA GT Championship
Previous race: 1998 FIA GT Dijon 500km	1998 season	Next race: 1998 Suzuka 1000km
