= 1998 FIA GT Homestead 500 km =

Layout of the Homestead-Miami Speedway road course

The 1998 FIA GT Homestead 500 km was the ninth round the 1998 FIA GT Championship season. It took place at the Homestead-Miami Speedway, Florida, United States on October 18, 1998.

== Official results ==
Class winners are in bold. Cars failing to complete 70% of winner's distance are marked as Not Classified (NC).

Pos	Class	No	Team	Drivers	Chassis	Tyre	Laps
Pos	Class	No	Team	Drivers	Engine	Tyre	Laps
1	**GT1**	**2**	**(Germany) AMG Mercedes**	**(Germany) Klaus Ludwig (Brazil) Ricardo Zonta**	**Mercedes-Benz CLK LM**	**B**	**141**
1	**GT1**	**2**	**(Germany) AMG Mercedes**	**(Germany) Klaus Ludwig (Brazil) Ricardo Zonta**	**Mercedes-Benz M119 6.0L V8**	**B**	**141**
2	GT1	8	(Germany) Porsche AG	(Germany) Jörg Müller (Germany) Uwe Alzen	Porsche 911 GT1-98	**MI**	141
2	GT1	8	(Germany) Porsche AG	(Germany) Jörg Müller (Germany) Uwe Alzen	Porsche 3.2L Turbo Flat-6	**MI**	141
3	GT1	7	(Germany) Porsche AG	(France) Yannick Dalmas (United Kingdom) Allan McNish	Porsche 911 GT1-98	**MI**	140
3	GT1	7	(Germany) Porsche AG	(France) Yannick Dalmas (United Kingdom) Allan McNish	Porsche 3.2L Turbo Flat-6	**MI**	140
4	GT1	1	(Germany) AMG Mercedes	(Germany) Bernd Schneider (Australia) Mark Webber	Mercedes-Benz CLK LM	**B**	140
4	GT1	1	(Germany) AMG Mercedes	(Germany) Bernd Schneider (Australia) Mark Webber	Mercedes-Benz M119 6.0L V8	**B**	140
5	GT1	12	(Germany) Team Persson Motorsport	(France) Jean-Marc Gounon (Germany) Marcel Tiemann	Mercedes-Benz CLK GTR	**B**	140
5	GT1	12	(Germany) Team Persson Motorsport	(France) Jean-Marc Gounon (Germany) Marcel Tiemann	Mercedes-Benz M120 6.0L V12	**B**	140
6	GT1	3	(France) DAMS	(France) Éric Bernard (Australia) David Brabham	Panoz GTR-1	**MI**	139
6	GT1	3	(France) DAMS	(France) Éric Bernard (Australia) David Brabham	Ford (Roush) 6.0L V8	**MI**	139
7	GT1	6	(Germany) Zakspeed Racing	(Germany) Michael Bartels (Italy) Max Angelelli	Porsche 911 GT1-98	**P**	138
7	GT1	6	(Germany) Zakspeed Racing	(Germany) Michael Bartels (Italy) Max Angelelli	Porsche 3.2L Turbo Flat-6	**P**	138
8	**GT2**	**51**	**(France) Viper Team Oreca**	**(Monaco) Olivier Beretta (Portugal) Pedro Lamy**	**Chrysler Viper GTS-R**	**MI**	**130**
8	**GT2**	**51**	**(France) Viper Team Oreca**	**(Monaco) Olivier Beretta (Portugal) Pedro Lamy**	**Chrysler 8.0L V10**	**MI**	**130**
9	GT2	56	(Germany) Roock Racing	(Germany) Claudia Hürtgen (France) Stéphane Ortelli	Porsche 911 GT2	**Y**	129
9	GT2	56	(Germany) Roock Racing	(Germany) Claudia Hürtgen (France) Stéphane Ortelli	Porsche 3.6L Turbo Flat-6	**Y**	129
10	GT2	70	(Netherlands) Marcos Racing International	(United Kingdom) Christian Vann (Germany) Harald Becker (Netherlands) Cor Euser	Marcos LM600	**D**	128
10	GT2	70	(Netherlands) Marcos Racing International	(United Kingdom) Christian Vann (Germany) Harald Becker (Netherlands) Cor Euser	Chevrolet 5.9L V8	**D**	128
11	GT2	63	(Germany) Krauss Race Sports International	(Germany) Michael Trunk (Germany) Bernhard Müller	Porsche 911 GT2	**D**	126
11	GT2	63	(Germany) Krauss Race Sports International	(Germany) Michael Trunk (Germany) Bernhard Müller	Porsche 3.6L Turbo Flat-6	**D**	126
12	GT2	58	(Germany) Roock Sportsystem	(Germany) André Ahrlé (United Kingdom) Andy Pilgrim	Porsche 911 GT2	**Y**	125
12	GT2	58	(Germany) Roock Sportsystem	(Germany) André Ahrlé (United Kingdom) Andy Pilgrim	Porsche 3.6L Turbo Flat-6	**Y**	125
13	GT2	81	(Germany) Freisinger Motorsport	(Germany) Wolfgang Kaufmann (France) Michel Ligonnet	Porsche 911 GT2	?	125
13	GT2	81	(Germany) Freisinger Motorsport	(Germany) Wolfgang Kaufmann (France) Michel Ligonnet	Porsche 3.6L Turbo Flat-6	?	125
14	GT2	65	(Germany) Konrad Motorsport	(United Kingdom) Martin Stretton (Switzerland) Toni Seiler	Porsche 911 GT2	**D**	123
14	GT2	65	(Germany) Konrad Motorsport	(United Kingdom) Martin Stretton (Switzerland) Toni Seiler	Porsche 3.6L Turbo Flat-6	**D**	123
15	GT2	76	(Germany) Seikel Motorsport	(United Kingdom) Nigel Smith (New Zealand) Andrew Bagnall (Morocco) Max Cohen-Olivar	Porsche 911 GT2	**P**	120
15	GT2	76	(Germany) Seikel Motorsport	(United Kingdom) Nigel Smith (New Zealand) Andrew Bagnall (Morocco) Max Cohen-Olivar	Porsche 3.6L Turbo Flat-6	**P**	120
16	GT2	61	(Switzerland) Elf Haberthur Racing	(Germany) Klaus Horn (Italy) Mauro Casadei	Porsche 911 GT2	**G**	120
16	GT2	61	(Switzerland) Elf Haberthur Racing	(Germany) Klaus Horn (Italy) Mauro Casadei	Porsche 3.6L Turbo Flat-6	**G**	120
17	GT2	87	(Germany) Seikel Motorsport	(Germany) Christian Vogler (Germany) Gerhard Marchner (Austria) Manfred Jurasz	Porsche 911 GT2	**P**	117
17	GT2	87	(Germany) Seikel Motorsport	(Germany) Christian Vogler (Germany) Gerhard Marchner (Austria) Manfred Jurasz	Porsche 3.6L Turbo Flat-6	**P**	117
18	GT2	86	(France) Larbre Compétition	(France) Jean-Luc Chéreau (France) Jack Leconte	Porsche 911 GT2	**MI**	113
18	GT2	86	(France) Larbre Compétition	(France) Jean-Luc Chéreau (France) Jack Leconte	Porsche 3.6L Turbo Flat-6	**MI**	113
19	GT2	57	(Germany) Roock Racing	(Switzerland) Bruno Eichmann (Netherlands) Mike Hezemans	Porsche 911 GT2	**Y**	98
19	GT2	57	(Germany) Roock Racing	(Switzerland) Bruno Eichmann (Netherlands) Mike Hezemans	Porsche 3.6L Turbo Flat-6	**Y**	98
20	GT2	71	(Netherlands) Marcos Racing International	(Netherlands) Herman Buurman (South Africa) Manno Schaafsma	Marcos LM600	**D**	95
20	GT2	71	(Netherlands) Marcos Racing International	(Netherlands) Herman Buurman (South Africa) Manno Schaafsma	Chevrolet 5.9L V8	**D**	95
21 DNF	GT1	11	(Germany) Team Persson Motorsport	(France) Christophe Bouchut (Germany) Bernd Mayländer	Mercedes-Benz CLK GTR	**B**	95
21 DNF	GT1	11	(Germany) Team Persson Motorsport	(France) Christophe Bouchut (Germany) Bernd Mayländer	Mercedes-Benz M120 6.0L V12	**B**	95
22 DNF	GT2	52	(France) Viper Team Oreca	(Austria) Karl Wendlinger (United States) David Donohue	Chrysler Viper GTS-R	**MI**	90
22 DNF	GT2	52	(France) Viper Team Oreca	(Austria) Karl Wendlinger (United States) David Donohue	Chrysler 8.0L V10	**MI**	90
23 DNF	GT2	69	(Germany) Proton Competition	(Germany) Gerold Ried (France) Patrick Vuillaume	Porsche 911 GT2	**P**	65
23 DNF	GT2	69	(Germany) Proton Competition	(Germany) Gerold Ried (France) Patrick Vuillaume	Porsche 3.6L Turbo Flat-6	**P**	65
24 DNF	GT2	53	(United Kingdom) Chamberlain Engineering	(Portugal) Ni Amorim (United Kingdom) Dominic Chappell (Netherlands) Hans Hugenholtz	Chrysler Viper GTS-R	**D**	46
24 DNF	GT2	53	(United Kingdom) Chamberlain Engineering	(Portugal) Ni Amorim (United Kingdom) Dominic Chappell (Netherlands) Hans Hugenholtz	Chrysler 8.0L V10	**D**	46
25 DNF	GT2	66	(Germany) Konrad Motorsport	(Netherlands) Jan Lammers (Austria) Franz Konrad	Porsche 911 GT2	**D**	21
25 DNF	GT2	66	(Germany) Konrad Motorsport	(Netherlands) Jan Lammers (Austria) Franz Konrad	Porsche 3.6L Turbo Flat-6	**D**	21
26 DNF	GT2	60	(Switzerland) Elf Haberthur Racing	(Belgium) Michel Neugarten (Germany) Gerd Ruch (United States) Zak Brown	Porsche 911 GT2	**G**	7
26 DNF	GT2	60	(Switzerland) Elf Haberthur Racing	(Belgium) Michel Neugarten (Germany) Gerd Ruch (United States) Zak Brown	Porsche 3.6L Turbo Flat-6	**G**	7
DNS	GT1	5	(Germany) Zakspeed Racing	(Germany) Armin Hahne (Germany) Andreas Scheld	Porsche 911 GT1-98	**P**	–
DNS	GT1	5	(Germany) Zakspeed Racing	(Germany) Armin Hahne (Germany) Andreas Scheld	Porsche 3.2L Turbo Flat-6	**P**	–
DNS	GT2	62	(Switzerland) Stadler Motorsport	(Italy) Renato Mastropietro (Switzerland) Uwe Sick	Porsche 911 GT2	**P**	–
DNS	GT2	62	(Switzerland) Stadler Motorsport	(Italy) Renato Mastropietro (Switzerland) Uwe Sick	Porsche 3.6L Turbo Flat-6	**P**	–
DNS	GT2	80	(United Kingdom) GP Motorsport	(United Kingdom) Daniel Dor (United Kingdom) Robert Schirle (United States) Simon Gregg	Saleen Mustang SR	?	–
DNS	GT2	80	(United Kingdom) GP Motorsport	(United Kingdom) Daniel Dor (United Kingdom) Robert Schirle (United States) Simon Gregg	Ford 5.9L V8	?	–

== Statistics ==
- Pole position – #2 AMG Mercedes – 1:14.298
- Fastest lap – #1 AMG Mercedes – 1:16.495
- Average speed – 151.314 km/h

FIA GT Championship
Previous race: 1998 FIA GT A1-Ring 500km	1998 season	Next race: 1998 FIA GT Laguna Seca 500km
