= 1998 FIA GT Dijon 500 km =

Race Course

Layout of the Dijon circuit

The 1998 FIA GT Dijon 500 km was the fourth round the 1998 FIA GT Championship season. It took place at Dijon-Prenois, France, on July 12, 1998.

== Official results ==
Class winners are in bold. Cars failing to complete 70% of winner's distance are marked as Not Classified (NC).

Pos	Class	No	Team	Drivers	Chassis	Tyre	Laps
Pos	Class	No	Team	Drivers	Engine	Tyre	Laps
1	**GT1**	**2**	**(Germany) AMG Mercedes**	**(Germany) Klaus Ludwig (Brazil) Ricardo Zonta**	**Mercedes-Benz CLK LM**	B	**132**
1	**GT1**	**2**	**(Germany) AMG Mercedes**	**(Germany) Klaus Ludwig (Brazil) Ricardo Zonta**	**Mercedes-Benz M119 6.0L V8**	B	**132**
2	GT1	7	(Germany) Porsche AG	(France) Yannick Dalmas (United Kingdom) Allan McNish	Porsche 911 GT1-98	MI	132
2	GT1	7	(Germany) Porsche AG	(France) Yannick Dalmas (United Kingdom) Allan McNish	Porsche 3.2L Turbo Flat-6	MI	132
3	GT1	3	(France) DAMS	(France) Éric Bernard (Australia) David Brabham	Panoz GTR-1	MI	130
3	GT1	3	(France) DAMS	(France) Éric Bernard (Australia) David Brabham	Ford (Roush) 6.0L V8	MI	130
4	GT1	11	(Germany) Team Persson Motorsport	(France) Christophe Bouchut (Germany) Bernd Mayländer	Mercedes-Benz CLK GTR	B	130
4	GT1	11	(Germany) Team Persson Motorsport	(France) Christophe Bouchut (Germany) Bernd Mayländer	Mercedes-Benz M120 6.0L V12	B	130
5	GT1	12	(Germany) Team Persson Motorsport	(France) Jean-Marc Gounon (Germany) Marcel Tiemann	Mercedes-Benz CLK GTR	B	129
5	GT1	12	(Germany) Team Persson Motorsport	(France) Jean-Marc Gounon (Germany) Marcel Tiemann	Mercedes-Benz M120 6.0L V12	B	129
6	GT1	6	(Germany) Zakspeed Racing	(Germany) Michael Bartels (Germany) Armin Hahne	Porsche 911 GT1-98	P	129
6	GT1	6	(Germany) Zakspeed Racing	(Germany) Michael Bartels (Germany) Armin Hahne	Porsche 3.2L Turbo Flat-6	P	129
7	GT1	5	(Germany) Zakspeed Racing	(Germany) Alexander Grau (Germany) Andreas Scheld	Porsche 911 GT1-98	P	128
7	GT1	5	(Germany) Zakspeed Racing	(Germany) Alexander Grau (Germany) Andreas Scheld	Porsche 3.2L Turbo Flat-6	P	128
8	GT1	17	(France) Larbre Compétition	(France) Bob Wollek (Sweden) Carl Rosenblad (France) Patrice Goueslard	Porsche 911 GT1 Evo	MI	124
8	GT1	17	(France) Larbre Compétition	(France) Bob Wollek (Sweden) Carl Rosenblad (France) Patrice Goueslard	Porsche 3.2L Turbo Flat-6	MI	124
9	**GT2**	**51**	**(France) Viper Team Oreca**	**(Monaco) Olivier Beretta (Portugal) Pedro Lamy**	**Chrysler Viper GTS-R**	MI	**120**
9	**GT2**	**51**	**(France) Viper Team Oreca**	**(Monaco) Olivier Beretta (Portugal) Pedro Lamy**	**Chrysler 8.0L V10**	MI	**120**
10	GT2	52	(France) Viper Team Oreca	(Austria) Karl Wendlinger (United States) David Donohue	Chrysler Viper GTS-R	MI	119
10	GT2	52	(France) Viper Team Oreca	(Austria) Karl Wendlinger (United States) David Donohue	Chrysler 8.0L V10	MI	119
11	GT1	1	(Germany) AMG Mercedes	(Germany) Bernd Schneider (Australia) Mark Webber	Mercedes-Benz CLK LM	B	116
11	GT1	1	(Germany) AMG Mercedes	(Germany) Bernd Schneider (Australia) Mark Webber	Mercedes-Benz M119 6.0L V8	B	116
12	GT2	77	(France) Sonauto Levallois	(France) Jean-Pierre Jarier (France) François Lafon	Porsche 911 GT2	P	115
12	GT2	77	(France) Sonauto Levallois	(France) Jean-Pierre Jarier (France) François Lafon	Porsche 3.6L Turbo Flat-6	P	115
13	GT2	66	(Germany) Konrad Motorsport	(France) Stéphane Sallaz (Austria) Franz Konrad	Porsche 911 GT2	D	114
13	GT2	66	(Germany) Konrad Motorsport	(France) Stéphane Sallaz (Austria) Franz Konrad	Porsche 3.6L Turbo Flat-6	D	114
14	GT2	57	(Germany) Roock Racing	(Germany) Sascha Maassen (Switzerland) Bruno Eichmann	Porsche 911 GT2	Y	114
14	GT2	57	(Germany) Roock Racing	(Germany) Sascha Maassen (Switzerland) Bruno Eichmann	Porsche 3.6L Turbo Flat-6	Y	114
15	GT2	63	(Germany) Krauss Race Sports International	(Germany) Michael Trunk (Germany) Bernhard Müller	Porsche 911 GT2	D	113
15	GT2	63	(Germany) Krauss Race Sports International	(Germany) Michael Trunk (Germany) Bernhard Müller	Porsche 3.6L Turbo Flat-6	D	113
16	GT2	56	(Germany) Roock Racing	(Germany) Claudia Hürtgen (France) Emmanuel Collard	Porsche 911 GT2	Y	112
16	GT2	56	(Germany) Roock Racing	(Germany) Claudia Hürtgen (France) Emmanuel Collard	Porsche 3.6L Turbo Flat-6	Y	112
17	GT2	96	(Germany) Proton Competition	(Austria) Horst Felbermayr, Sr. (Austria) Horst Felbermayr, Jr.	Porsche 911 GT2	P	111
17	GT2	96	(Germany) Proton Competition	(Austria) Horst Felbermayr, Sr. (Austria) Horst Felbermayr, Jr.	Porsche 3.6L Turbo Flat-6	P	111
18	GT2	62	(Switzerland) Stadler Motorsport	(Germany) Axel Röhr (Switzerland) Uwe Sick	Porsche 911 GT2	P	111
18	GT2	62	(Switzerland) Stadler Motorsport	(Germany) Axel Röhr (Switzerland) Uwe Sick	Porsche 3.6L Turbo Flat-6	P	111
19	GT2	58	(Germany) Roock Sportsystem	(Germany) André Ahrlé (Thailand) Ratanakul Prutirat	Porsche 911 GT2	Y	109
19	GT2	58	(Germany) Roock Sportsystem	(Germany) André Ahrlé (Thailand) Ratanakul Prutirat	Porsche 3.6L Turbo Flat-6	Y	109
20	GT2	53	(United Kingdom) Chamberlain Engineering	(Portugal) Ni Amorim (United Kingdom) Gary Ayles	Chrysler Viper GTS-R	D	107
20	GT2	53	(United Kingdom) Chamberlain Engineering	(Portugal) Ni Amorim (United Kingdom) Gary Ayles	Chrysler 8.0L V10	D	107
21	GT2	69	(Germany) Proton Competition	(Germany) Gerold Ried (France) Patrick Vuillaume	Porsche 911 GT2	P	107
21	GT2	69	(Germany) Proton Competition	(Germany) Gerold Ried (France) Patrick Vuillaume	Porsche 3.6L Turbo Flat-6	P	107
22	GT2	61	(Switzerland) Elf Haberthur Racing	(France) Eric Graham (France) Hervé Poulain (France) David Smadja	Porsche 911 GT2	G	106
22	GT2	61	(Switzerland) Elf Haberthur Racing	(France) Eric Graham (France) Hervé Poulain (France) David Smadja	Porsche 3.6L Turbo Flat-6	G	106
23	GT1	27	(United Kingdom) Parabolica Motorsports (France) BBA Compétition	(France) Jean-Luc Maury-Laribière (France) Patrick Caternet	McLaren F1 GTR	D	106
23	GT1	27	(United Kingdom) Parabolica Motorsports (France) BBA Compétition	(France) Jean-Luc Maury-Laribière (France) Patrick Caternet	BMW S70 6.1L V12	D	106
24	GT2	60	(Switzerland) Elf Haberthur Racing	(Belgium) Michel Neugarten (Germany) Gerd Ruch (Italy) Marco Spinelli	Porsche 911 GT2	G	106
24	GT2	60	(Switzerland) Elf Haberthur Racing	(Belgium) Michel Neugarten (Germany) Gerd Ruch (Italy) Marco Spinelli	Porsche 3.6L Turbo Flat-6	G	106
25	GT1	8	(Germany) Porsche AG	(Germany) Uwe Alzen (Germany) Jörg Müller	Porsche 911 GT1-98	MI	96
25	GT1	8	(Germany) Porsche AG	(Germany) Uwe Alzen (Germany) Jörg Müller	Porsche 3.2L Turbo Flat-6	MI	96
26	GT2	65	(Germany) Konrad Motorsport	(United Kingdom) Martin Stretton (Switzerland) Toni Seiler	Porsche 911 GT2	D	92
26	GT2	65	(Germany) Konrad Motorsport	(United Kingdom) Martin Stretton (Switzerland) Toni Seiler	Porsche 3.6L Turbo Flat-6	D	92
27 DNF	GT2	70	(Netherlands) Marcos Racing International	(United Kingdom) Christian Vann (Germany) Harald Becker (Netherlands) Cor Euser	Marcos LM600	D	76
27 DNF	GT2	70	(Netherlands) Marcos Racing International	(United Kingdom) Christian Vann (Germany) Harald Becker (Netherlands) Cor Euser	Chevrolet 5.9L V8	D	76
28 DNF	GT2	76	(Germany) Seikel Motorsport	(France) Bernard Schwach (Germany) Peter Seikel (Germany) Fred Rosterg	Porsche 911 GT2	P	3
28 DNF	GT2	76	(Germany) Seikel Motorsport	(France) Bernard Schwach (Germany) Peter Seikel (Germany) Fred Rosterg	Porsche 3.6L Turbo Flat-6	P	3

== Statistics ==
- Pole position – #1 AMG Mercedes – 1:08.762
- Fastest lap – #1 AMG Mercedes – 1:10.861
- Average speed – 180.989 km/h

FIA GT Championship
Previous race: 1998 FIA GT Hockenheim 500km	1998 season	Next race: 1998 FIA GT Budapest 500km
