= 1998 FIA GT Silverstone 500 km =

Motorsport event

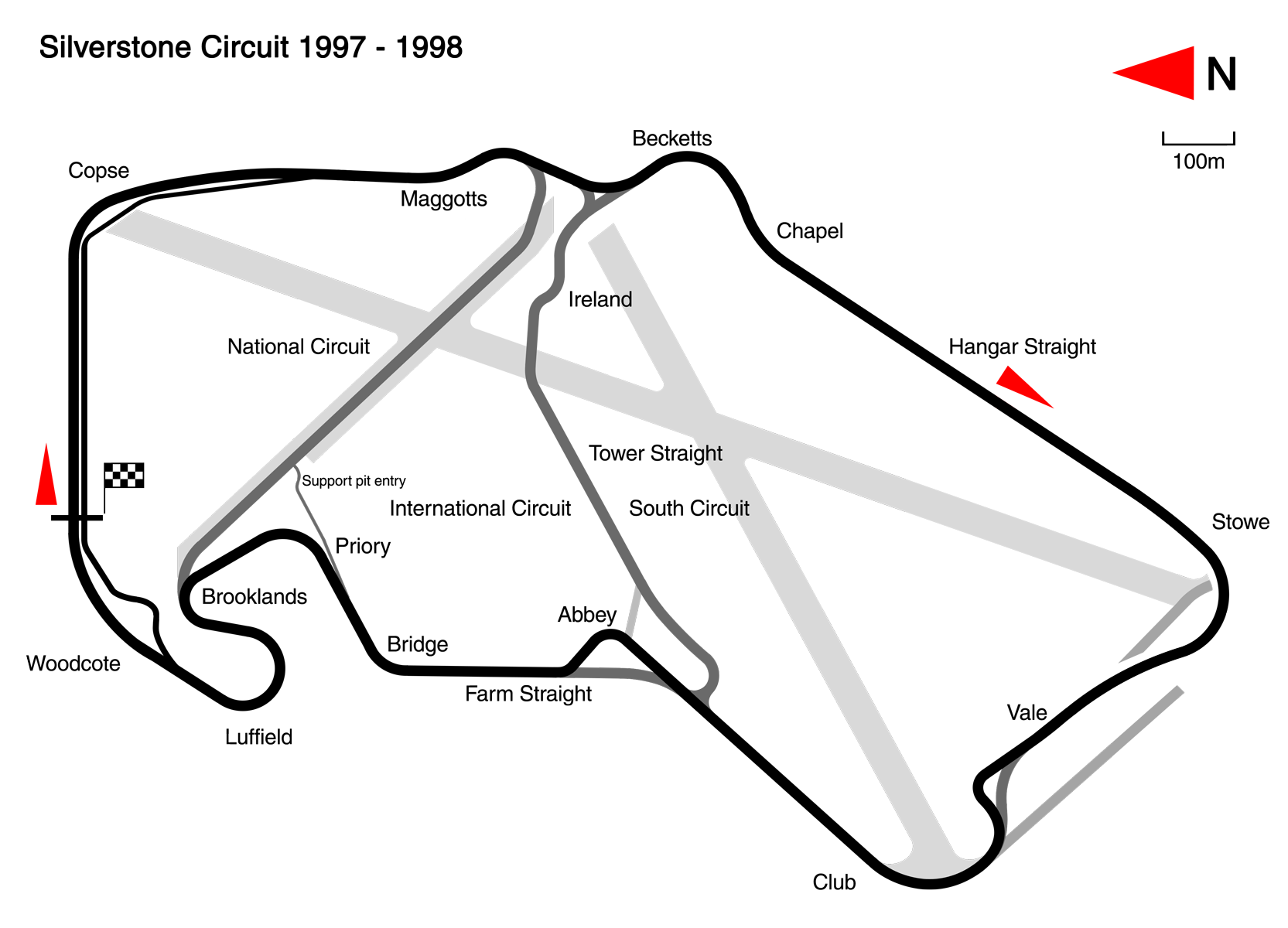
Map of the Silverstone Circuit (1997-1998)

The 1998 British Empire Trophy was the second round of the 1998 FIA GT Championship. It took place at the Silverstone Circuit, United Kingdom on 17 May 1998.

== Official results ==
Class winners are in bold. Cars failing to complete 70% of winner's distance are marked as Not Classified (NC).

Pos	Class	No	Team	Drivers	Chassis	Tyre	Laps
Pos	Class	No	Team	Drivers	Engine	Tyre	Laps
1	**GT1**	**1**	**(Germany) AMG Mercedes**	**(Germany) Bernd Schneider (Australia) Mark Webber**	**Mercedes-Benz CLK GTR**	B	**98**
1	**GT1**	**1**	**(Germany) AMG Mercedes**	**(Germany) Bernd Schneider (Australia) Mark Webber**	**Mercedes-Benz M120 6.0L V12**	B	**98**
2	GT1	8	(Germany) Porsche AG	(Germany) Uwe Alzen (Germany) Jörg Müller	Porsche 911 GT1-98	M	98
2	GT1	8	(Germany) Porsche AG	(Germany) Uwe Alzen (Germany) Jörg Müller	Porsche 3.2L Turbo Flat-6	M	98
3	GT1	6	(Germany) Zakspeed Racing	(Germany) Michael Bartels (Germany) Armin Hahne	Porsche 911 GT1-98	P	97
3	GT1	6	(Germany) Zakspeed Racing	(Germany) Michael Bartels (Germany) Armin Hahne	Porsche 3.2L Turbo Flat-6	P	97
4	GT1	2	(Germany) AMG Mercedes	(Germany) Klaus Ludwig (Brazil) Ricardo Zonta	Mercedes-Benz CLK GTR	B	97
4	GT1	2	(Germany) AMG Mercedes	(Germany) Klaus Ludwig (Brazil) Ricardo Zonta	Mercedes-Benz M120 6.0L V12	B	97
5	GT1	5	(Germany) Zakspeed Racing	(Germany) Alexander Grau (Germany) Andreas Scheld	Porsche 911 GT1-98	P	96
5	GT1	5	(Germany) Zakspeed Racing	(Germany) Alexander Grau (Germany) Andreas Scheld	Porsche 3.2L Turbo Flat-6	P	96
6	GT1	15	(United Kingdom) Davidoff Classic (United Kingdom) GTC Competition	(Germany) Thomas Bscher (United Kingdom) Geoff Lees	McLaren F1 GTR	G	94
6	GT1	15	(United Kingdom) Davidoff Classic (United Kingdom) GTC Competition	(Germany) Thomas Bscher (United Kingdom) Geoff Lees	BMW S70 6.0L V12	G	94
7	GT1	11	(Germany) Team Persson Motorsport	(France) Christophe Bouchut (Germany) Bernd Mayländer	Mercedes-Benz CLK GTR	B	94
7	GT1	11	(Germany) Team Persson Motorsport	(France) Christophe Bouchut (Germany) Bernd Mayländer	Mercedes-Benz M120 6.0L V12	B	94
8	GT1	3	(France) DAMS	(Australia) David Brabham (France) Éric Bernard	Panoz GTR-1	M	92
8	GT1	3	(France) DAMS	(Australia) David Brabham (France) Éric Bernard	Ford (Roush) 6.0L V8	M	92
9	**GT2**	**51**	**(France) Viper Team Oreca**	**(Portugal) Pedro Lamy (Monaco) Olivier Beretta**	**Chrysler Viper GTS-R**	M	**88**
9	**GT2**	**51**	**(France) Viper Team Oreca**	**(Portugal) Pedro Lamy (Monaco) Olivier Beretta**	**Chrysler 8.0L V10**	M	**88**
10	GT2	60	(Switzerland) Elf Haberthur Racing	(Belgium) Michel Neugarten (Germany) Gerd Ruch (Italy) Marco Spinelli	Porsche 911 GT2	G	86
10	GT2	60	(Switzerland) Elf Haberthur Racing	(Belgium) Michel Neugarten (Germany) Gerd Ruch (Italy) Marco Spinelli	Porsche 3.6L Turbo Flat-6	G	86
11	GT2	62	(Switzerland) Stadler Motorsport	(Switzerland) Uwe Sick (Germany) Axel Röhr	Porsche 911 GT2	P	82
11	GT2	62	(Switzerland) Stadler Motorsport	(Switzerland) Uwe Sick (Germany) Axel Röhr	Porsche 3.6L Turbo Flat-6	P	82
12	GT2	69	(Germany) Proton Competition	(Germany) Gerold Ried (France) Patrick Vuillaume	Porsche 911 GT2	P	82
12	GT2	69	(Germany) Proton Competition	(Germany) Gerold Ried (France) Patrick Vuillaume	Porsche 3.6L Turbo Flat-6	P	82
13	GT2	54	(United Kingdom) Chamberlain Engineering	(Netherlands) Hans Hugenholtz (United States) Matt Turner	Chrysler Viper GTS-R	D	82
13	GT2	54	(United Kingdom) Chamberlain Engineering	(Netherlands) Hans Hugenholtz (United States) Matt Turner	Chrysler 8.0L V10	D	82
14	GT2	53	(United Kingdom) Chamberlain Engineering	(Portugal) Ni Amorim (Portugal) Gonçalo Gomes	Chrysler Viper GTS-R	D	82
14	GT2	53	(United Kingdom) Chamberlain Engineering	(Portugal) Ni Amorim (Portugal) Gonçalo Gomes	Chrysler 8.0L V10	D	82
15	GT2	66	(Germany) Konrad Motorsport	(Austria) Franz Konrad (United States) Nick Ham	Porsche 911 GT2	D	80
15	GT2	66	(Germany) Konrad Motorsport	(Austria) Franz Konrad (United States) Nick Ham	Porsche 3.6L Turbo Flat-6	D	80
16	GT2	63	(Germany) Krauss Race Sports International	(Germany) Michael Trunk (Germany) Bernhard Müller	Porsche 911 GT2	D	79
16	GT2	63	(Germany) Krauss Race Sports International	(Germany) Michael Trunk (Germany) Bernhard Müller	Porsche 3.6L Turbo Flat-6	D	79
17	GT2	65	(Germany) Konrad Motorsport	(Switzerland) Toni Seiler (United Kingdom) Martin Stretton	Porsche 911 GT2	D	72
17	GT2	65	(Germany) Konrad Motorsport	(Switzerland) Toni Seiler (United Kingdom) Martin Stretton	Porsche 3.6L Turbo Flat-6	D	72
18	GT2	58	(Germany) Roock Sportsystem	(United Kingdom) Tim Sugden (United Kingdom) Peter Owen (Germany) André Ahrlé	Porsche 911 GT2	Y	62
18	GT2	58	(Germany) Roock Sportsystem	(United Kingdom) Tim Sugden (United Kingdom) Peter Owen (Germany) André Ahrlé	Porsche 3.6L Turbo Flat-6	Y	62
19 DNF	GT2	56	(Germany) Roock Racing	(Germany) Claudia Hürtgen (France) Stéphane Ortelli	Porsche 911 GT2	Y	44
19 DNF	GT2	56	(Germany) Roock Racing	(Germany) Claudia Hürtgen (France) Stéphane Ortelli	Porsche 3.6L Turbo Flat-6	Y	44
20 DNF	GT2	98	(United Kingdom) Cirtek Motorsport (United States) Saleen-Allen Speedlab	(United Kingdom) Robert Schirle (United Kingdom) David Warnock	Saleen Mustang SR	D	28
20 DNF	GT2	98	(United Kingdom) Cirtek Motorsport (United States) Saleen-Allen Speedlab	(United Kingdom) Robert Schirle (United Kingdom) David Warnock	Ford 5.9L V8	D	28
21 DNF	GT1	27	(United Kingdom) Parabolica Motorsports (France) BBA Compétition	(France) Jean-Luc Maury-Laribière (France) Patrick Caternet	McLaren F1 GTR	D	25
21 DNF	GT1	27	(United Kingdom) Parabolica Motorsports (France) BBA Compétition	(France) Jean-Luc Maury-Laribière (France) Patrick Caternet	BMW S70 6.1L V12	D	25
22 DNF	GT2	52	(France) Viper Team Oreca	(Austria) Karl Wendlinger (United Kingdom) Justin Bell	Chrysler Viper GTS-R	M	25
22 DNF	GT2	52	(France) Viper Team Oreca	(Austria) Karl Wendlinger (United Kingdom) Justin Bell	Chrysler 8.0L V10	M	25
23 DNF	GT1	10	(Netherlands) Team Hezemans	(Germany) Rainer Bonnetsmüller (Austria) Manfred Jurasz (Germany) Stefan Hackl	Bitter GT1	G	20
23 DNF	GT1	10	(Netherlands) Team Hezemans	(Germany) Rainer Bonnetsmüller (Austria) Manfred Jurasz (Germany) Stefan Hackl	Chrysler 8.0L V10	G	20
24 DNF	GT1	7	(Germany) Porsche AG	(United Kingdom) Allan McNish (France) Bob Wollek	Porsche 911 GT1-98	M	13
24 DNF	GT1	7	(Germany) Porsche AG	(United Kingdom) Allan McNish (France) Bob Wollek	Porsche 3.2L Turbo Flat-6	M	13
25 DNF	GT2	57	(Germany) Roock Racing	(Switzerland) Bruno Eichmann (Germany) Sascha Maassen	Porsche 911 GT2	Y	13
25 DNF	GT2	57	(Germany) Roock Racing	(Switzerland) Bruno Eichmann (Germany) Sascha Maassen	Porsche 3.6L Turbo Flat-6	Y	13
26 DNF	GT2	70	(Netherlands) Marcos Racing International	(Netherlands) Cor Euser (Germany) Harald Becker	Marcos LM600	D	12
26 DNF	GT2	70	(Netherlands) Marcos Racing International	(Netherlands) Cor Euser (Germany) Harald Becker	Chevrolet 5.9L V8	D	12
27 DNF	GT2	96	(Germany) Proton Competition	(Austria) Horst Felbermayr Sr. (Austria) Horst Felbermayr Jr.	Porsche 911 GT2	P	10
27 DNF	GT2	96	(Germany) Proton Competition	(Austria) Horst Felbermayr Sr. (Austria) Horst Felbermayr Jr.	Porsche 3.6L Turbo Flat-6	P	10
28 DNF	GT1	12	(Germany) Team Persson Motorsport	(France) Jean-Marc Gounon (Germany) Marcel Tiemann	Mercedes-Benz CLK GTR	B	6
28 DNF	GT1	12	(Germany) Team Persson Motorsport	(France) Jean-Marc Gounon (Germany) Marcel Tiemann	Mercedes-Benz M120 6.0L V12	B	6
29 DNF	GT1	9	(Netherlands) Team Hezemans	(Netherlands) Jan Lammers (Netherlands) Mike Hezemans	Bitter GT1	G	2
29 DNF	GT1	9	(Netherlands) Team Hezemans	(Netherlands) Jan Lammers (Netherlands) Mike Hezemans	Chrysler 8.0L V10	G	2

== Statistics ==
- Pole position – #7 Porsche AG – 1:39.703
- Fastest lap – #8 Porsche AG – 1:42.719
- Average speed – 173.231 km/h

FIA GT Championship
Previous race: 1998 FIA GT Oschersleben 500km	1998 season	Next race: 1998 FIA GT Hockenheim 500km
