= Mercedes-Benz 420 =

Mercedes-Benz has sold a number of automobiles with the "420" model name:

- 1994–1995 W124
  - 1994–1995 E420
- 1986–1991 W126
  - 1986–1991 420SEL
- 1994-1999 W140
  - 1994-1999 S420
- 1997 W210
  - 1997 E420

2006-2009 Mercedes-Benz W221 S420 CDI
