= Mercedes-Benz 400 =

Mercedes-Benz has sold a number of automobiles with the "400" model name:

- 1926–1929 Type 400 (1924–1926 15/70/100 hp)
- 1992–1995 W124
  - 1992–1995 400E
- 1992 W140
  - 1992 400SE
  - 1993 400SEL
