= Mercedes-Benz CL-Class =

Grand tourer cars by Mercedes-Benz (1992–2014)

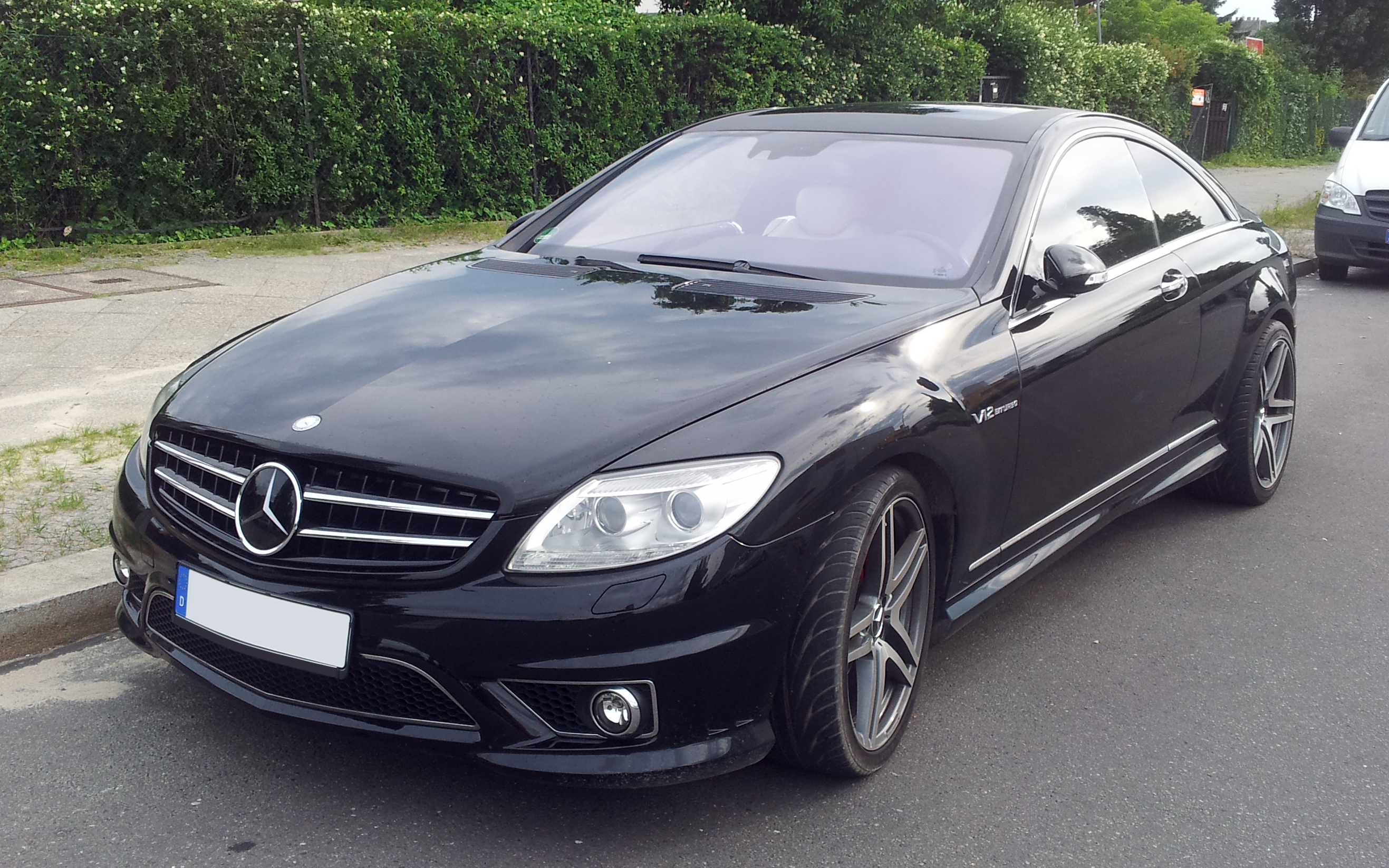

Overview
- Manufacturer: Daimler-Benz (1992–1998); DaimlerChrysler (1998–2007); Daimler AG (2007–2014)
- Production: 1992–2013 (Europe); 1992–2014 (US)
- Assembly: Germany: Sindelfingen

Body and chassis
- Class: Grand tourer (S); Personal luxury car
- Body style: 2-door coupé
- Related: Mercedes-Benz S-Class; Mercedes-Benz CLS-Class

Chronology
- Predecessor: Mercedes-Benz S-Class Coupé (C126)
- Successor: Mercedes-Benz S-Class Coupé (C217)

The Mercedes-Benz CL-Class is a line of grand tourers which are produced by German automaker Mercedes-Benz, produced from 1992 to 2014. The name CL stands for the German Coupé Luxusklasse (Coupé-Luxury). It was considered by Mercedes as their premier model.

In 2015 Mercedes officially ceased using the CL-Class designation, returning the vehicle's name back to the S-Class Coupe/Convertible, replacing it with the C217 S-Class Coupé.

== History ==
The equipment of the luxury class coupé corresponds to its position at the top of the Mercedes-Benz model programme, which is built at the Sindelfingen plant on its own line

— Daimler AG

The CL-Class was the coupé derivative of the S-Class full-size luxury saloon, upon which it shares the same platform. Formerly known as the SEC (Sonderklasse-Einspritzmotor-Coupé) and later S-Coupé, it was spun off into its own, separate name in 1996 and in 1997 for North American markets. The CL continued to follow the same development cycle as the S, though riding on a shorter wheelbase, and sharing the same engines albeit with less choice as only the higher-output powertrains are offered. The last generation of the CL was actually heavier than its corresponding S trim (considering equivalent equipment), due to the roof engineering required to compensate for the lack of a central B-pillar.

== First generation (C140; 1992–1998) ==
First generation
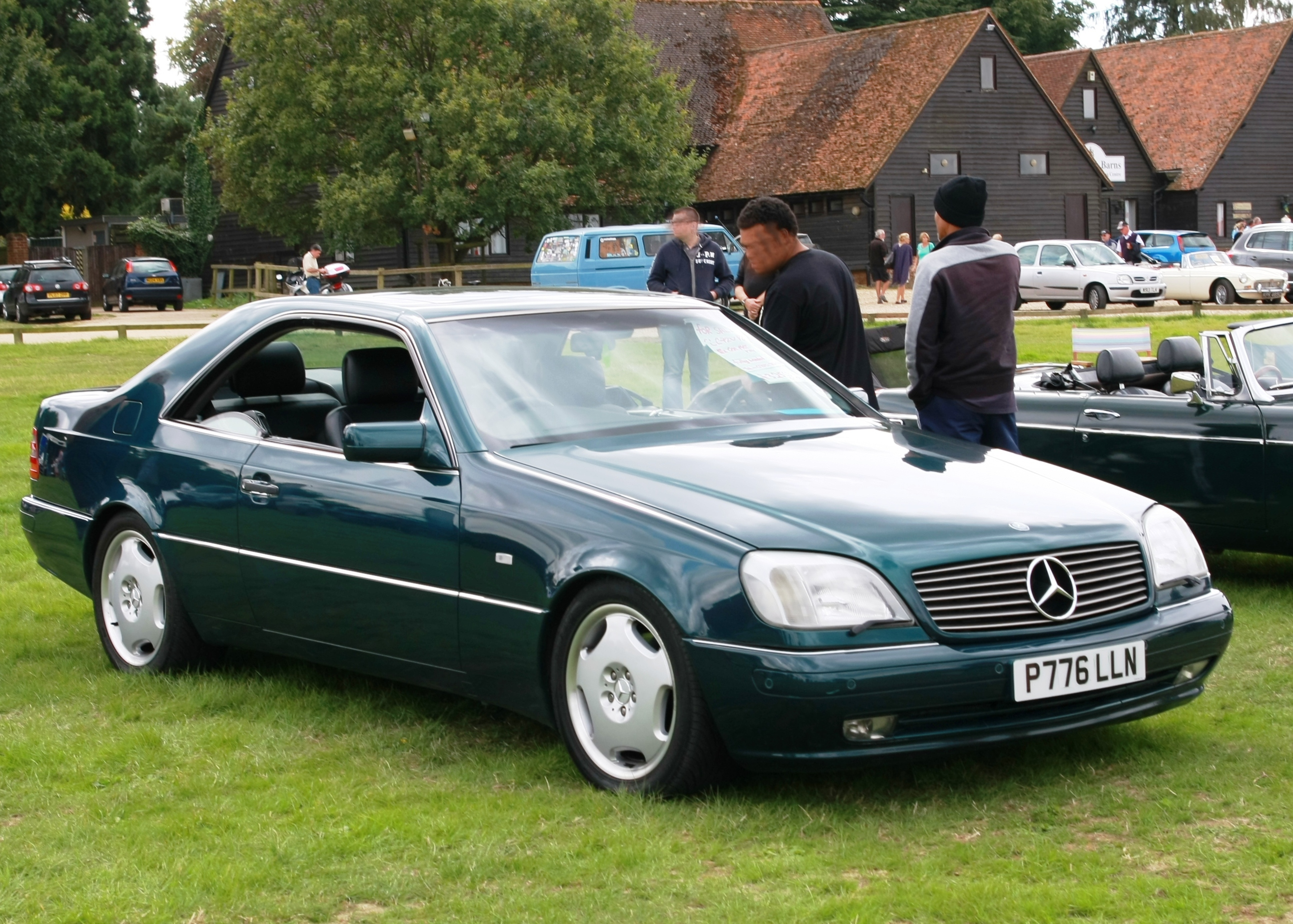

Overview
- Production: 1992–1998

Body and chassis
- Platform: Mercedes-Benz W140

Powertrain
- Engine: 4.2 – 5.0L V8; 6.0 – 7.3L V12
- Transmission: 4-speed automatic 5-speed automatic

Dimensions
- Wheelbase: 2,944 mm (115.9 in)
- Length: 5,065 mm (199.4 in)
- Width: 1,895 mm (74.6 in)
- Height: 1,427 mm (56.2 in)
- Curb weight: 2,060–2,240 kg (4,542–4,938 lb)

Chronology
- Predecessor: Mercedes-Benz C126

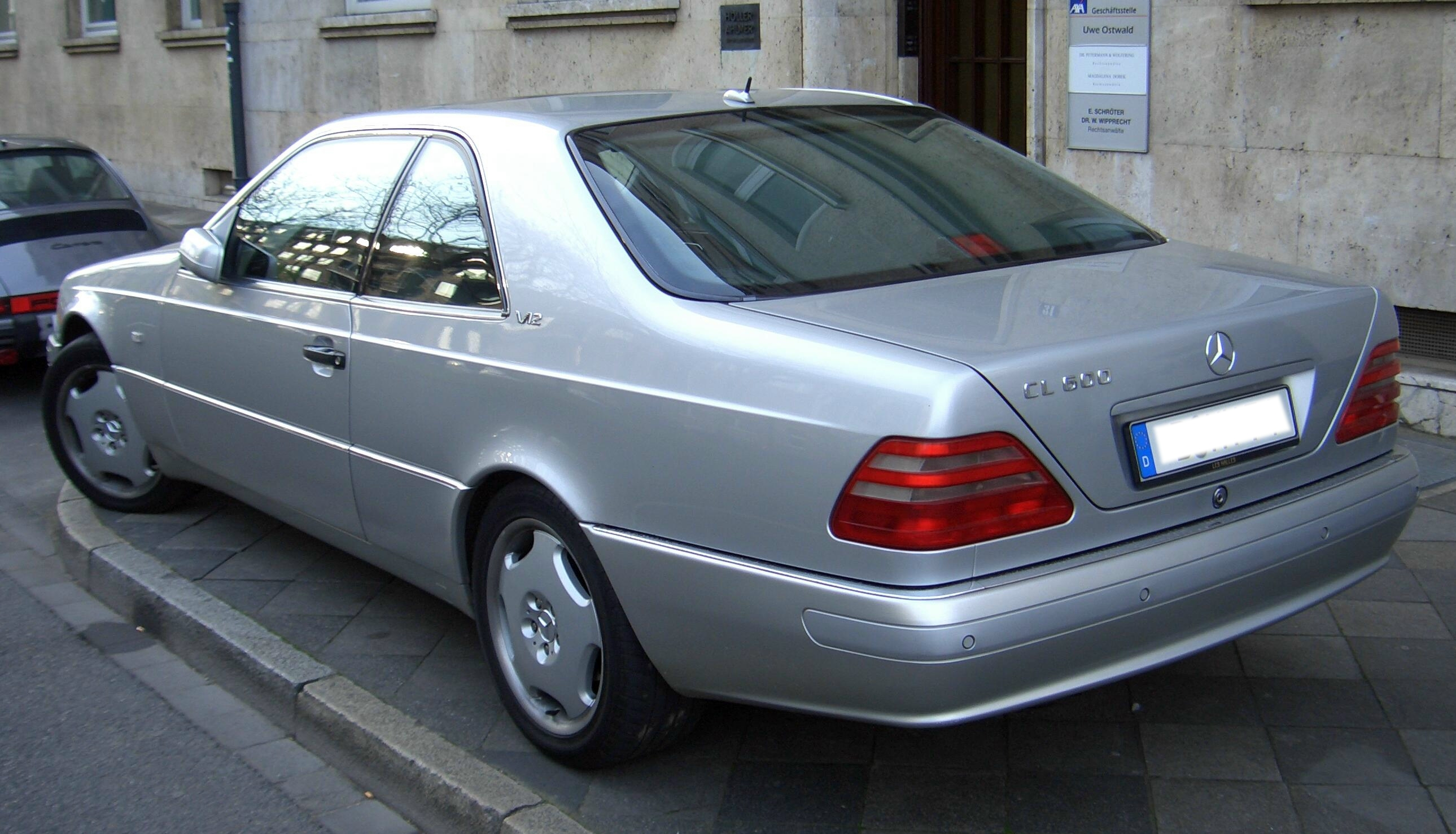
Mercedes-Benz CL 600

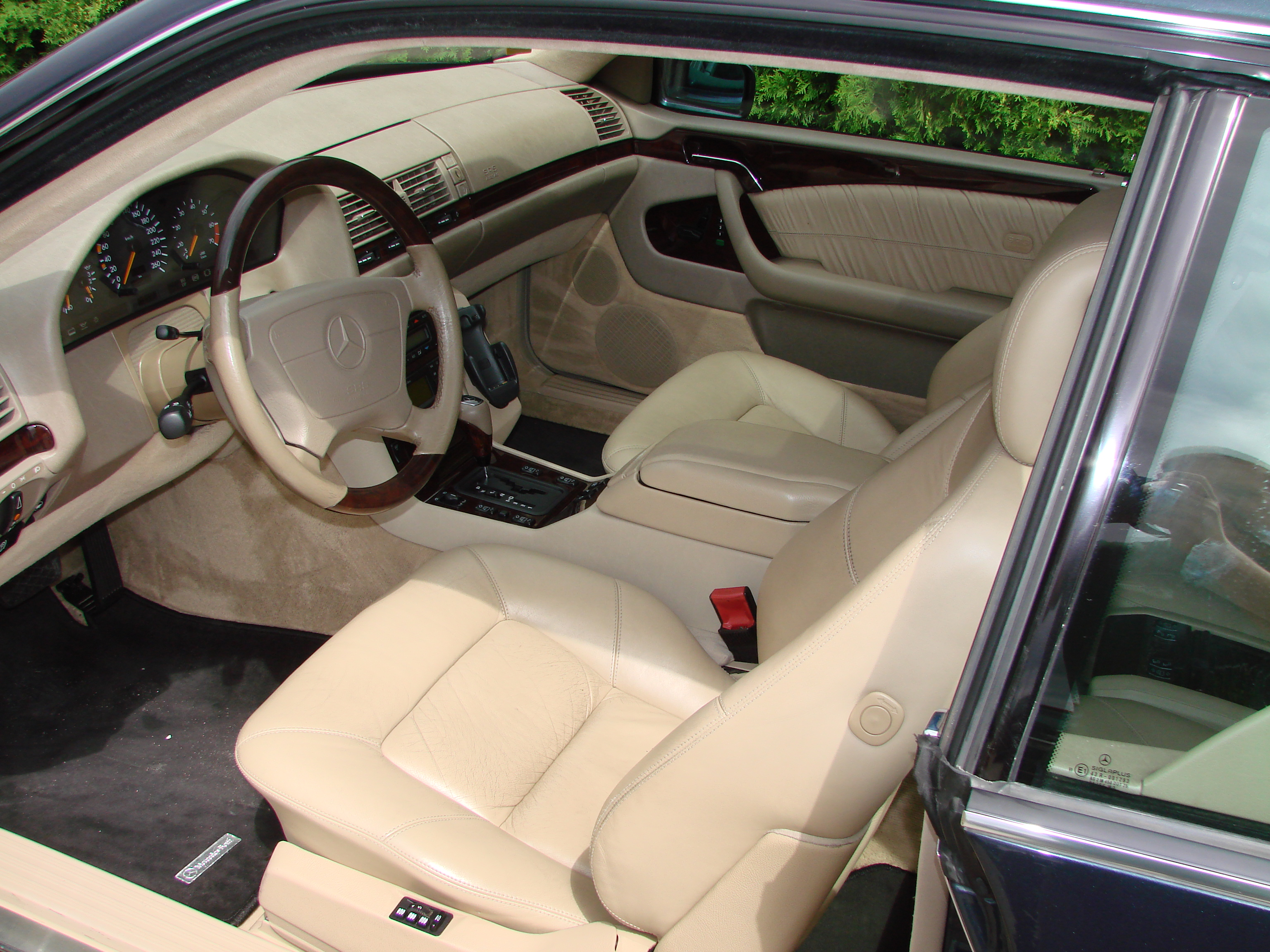
Mercedes-Benz CL 500 interior

The first generation CL-Class was the redesigned W140-chassis (internally known as C140) coupé of 1992–1999. Designed by Bruno Sacco, the C140's final design was approved between late 1987 and early 1988. Though the coupé's physical appearance changed little over these years, the class underwent a name change several times. The V8 and V12 coupés were called the 500 SEC and 600 SEC, respectively, in 1992 and 1993. The 600 SEC was the first V12 coupé ever offered by Mercedes-Benz. For 1994, the model names were changed to the S500 Coupé and the S600 Coupé. The name CL-Class was adopted in June 1996 (1997 for MY1998 North American models), and the W140 coupés were called the CL500 and CL600.

The M119 5.0 L V8 engine was regarded as one of the best engines ever produced by the German manufacturer (according to various journalists from automobile magazines such as Car and Auto Motor Und Sport).

Twelve cylinder variants can be identified by the "V12" emblems at the base of each C pillar, placed immediately behind the passenger windows. An entry-level model, the CL420, was available with a 4.2 L V8 engine (with the same architecture as the M119 5.0 L V8 engine) and since it was not available at all markets, it had very low sales compared to its larger-engined siblings. Production ended in 1998, with 1999 being the final model year, with 26,022 Coupés produced.

=== Engines ===
Specifications for European model.

	Engine	Power at rpm	Torque at rpm	0–100 km/h (62 mph)	Top speed*
CL 420	4.2 L V8 M119	205 kW (279 PS; 275 hp) at 5,700	400 N⋅m (295 lb⋅ft) at 3,900	7.9 seconds	250 km/h (155 mph)
CL 500 (1994)	5.0 L V8 M119	240 kW (326 PS; 322 hp) at 5,600	470 N⋅m (347 lb⋅ft) at 3,900	6.8 seconds	250 km/h (155 mph)
CL 600 (1994)	6.0 L V12 M120	290 kW (394 PS; 389 hp) at 5,200	570 N⋅m (420 lb⋅ft) at 3,800	6.1 seconds	250 km/h (155 mph)
CL 600 AMG	6.0 L V12 M120	327 kW (445 PS; 439 hp)	623 N⋅m (460 lb⋅ft)	5.6 seconds	288 km/h (179 mph)
S/CL 70 AMG (1994)	7.1 L V12 M120	365 kW (496 PS; 489 hp)	720 N⋅m (531 lb⋅ft)	5.2 seconds	300 km/h (186 mph)
S/CL 72 AMG (1996)	7.1 L V12 M120	380 kW (517 PS; 510 hp)	740 N⋅m (546 lb⋅ft)	5.0 seconds	310 km/h (193 mph)
S/CL 73 AMG	7.3 L V12 M120	386 kW (525 PS; 518 hp)	750 N⋅m (553 lb⋅ft)	4.9 seconds	320 km/h (199 mph)

* All are electronically limited

== Second generation (C215; 1998–2006) ==
Second generation
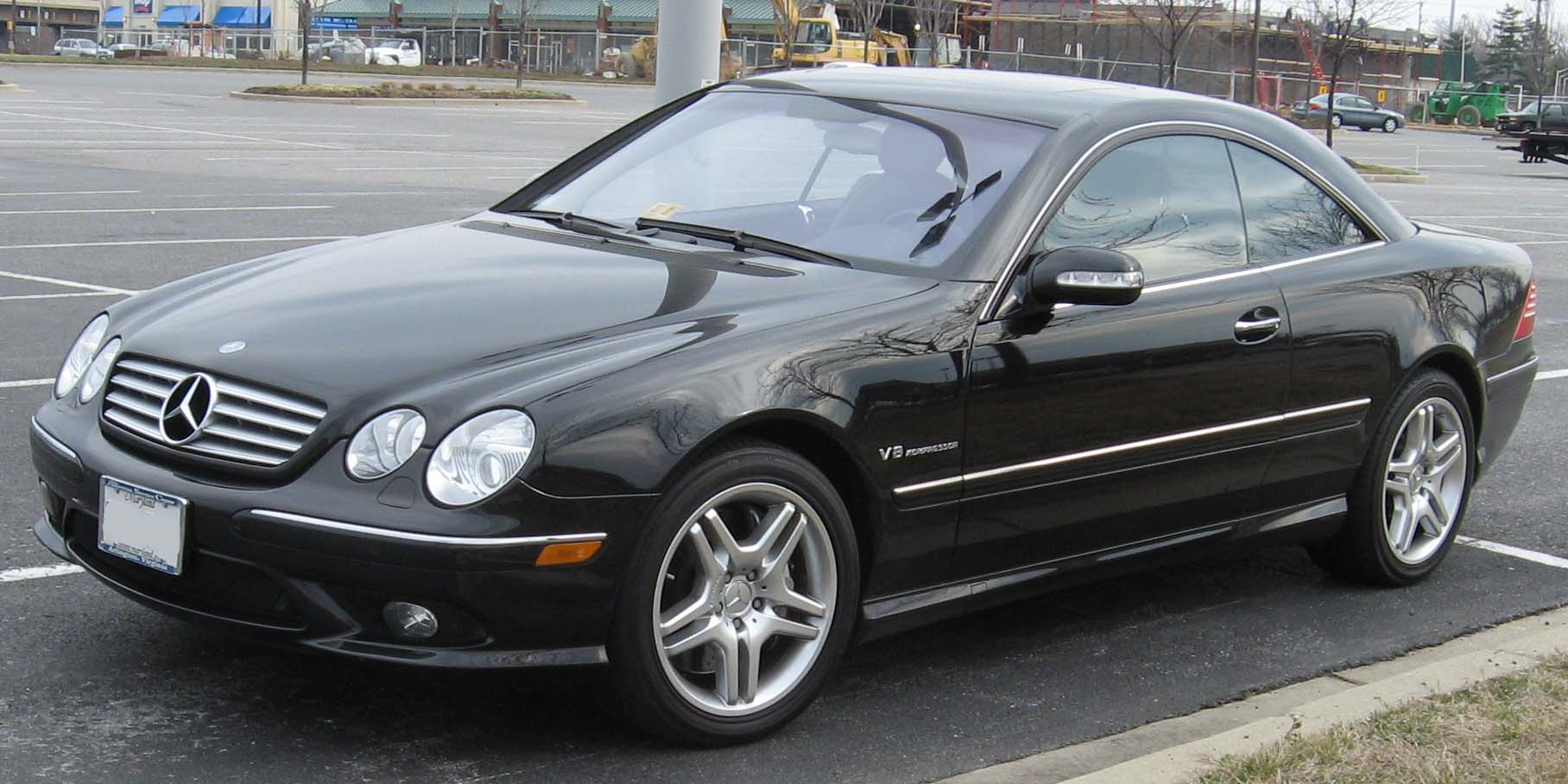

Overview
- Production: 1998–2006

Body and chassis
- Platform: Mercedes-Benz C215

Powertrain
- Engine: 5.0L V8; 5.4L V8; 5.4L V8 s/c; 5.5L V12 biturbo; 5.8L V12; 6.0L V12 biturbo; 6.3L V12
- Transmission: 5-speed automatic 7-speed automatic

Dimensions
- Wheelbase: 2,885 mm (113.6 in)
- Length: 4,993 mm (196.6 in)
- Width: 1,857 mm (73.1 in)
- Height: 1,398 mm (55.0 in)
- Curb weight: 1,865–2,155 kg (4,112–4,751 lb)

The second generation CL was the C215-chassis four passenger coupé of 1998–2006, with development 1993 to 1999 and final design approved in 1996. It was based on the Mercedes-Benz S-Class (W220) (which was launched in late 1998 in Europe), though it rides on an 8-inch (203 mm) shorter wheelbase. Upon release, it was the only pillarless hardtop in production, until the CLK also became pillarless in 2001. The CL's front fascia of four oval headlights was similar to the headlights used on the W210 and W211 E-Class.

The CL model variants included the:

- CL 500 with a naturally-aspirated (NA) V8 (1999–2006)
- CL 55 AMG with a naturally-aspirated V8 (2000–2002)
- CL 600 with a naturally-aspirated V12 (2000–2002)
- CL 55 AMG with a supercharged V8 (2003–2006)
- CL 600 with a 5.5 litre Biturbo V12 (limited production, about 200 per year worldwide) (2003–2006)
- CL 55 AMG F1 Edition with a naturally-aspirated V8 (55 examples only) (2000)
- CL 63 AMG (limited production, 26 examples only) (2001)
- CL 65 AMG with a 6.0 litre Biturbo V12 (limited production, 196 total) (2004–2006)

The C215 CL coupés introduced the Active Body Control (ABC) fully active suspension system and Bi-Xenon HID lights). Active Body Control uses four hydraulic suspension rams that use three pressure regulators connected to a combination power steering and suspension pump, pushing fluid at a pressure of 2,960 psi (20,400 kPa) through the system that, along with several intermediate computers and master CPU, keeps this car flat through the corners. The W220 S-Class sibling had standard Airmatic air suspension (a semi-active suspension system) across the range with ABC as an option, although ABC was included on top-performing trims (S 55 AMG (supercharged), S 600 (biturbo), and S 65 AMG). Other drivetrain differences from the W220 included no availability of 4Matic, and no diesel engines (inline-6 or V6) nor V6 petrol engines on the C215.

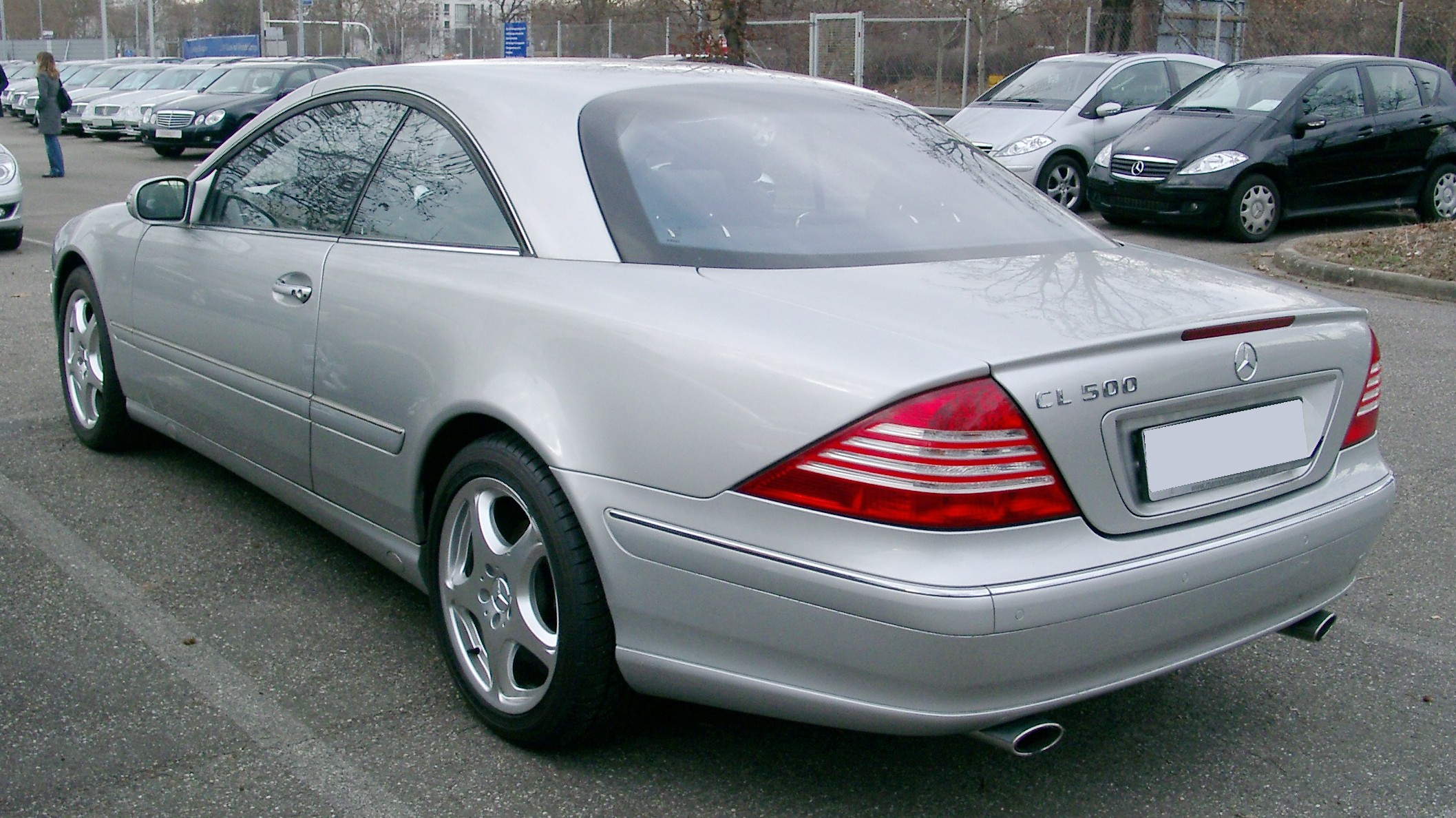
Mercedes-Benz CL 500

Standard equipment on the C215 includes active suspension (see above), climate control, all-leather interior, designer wood trim, trip computer, CD, navigation system, front heated seats, power moonroof, as well as power door and trunk closing assist. The CL also features double hinged doors, which move forward slightly as they open to allow for a larger opening in tight spaces. Optional features include a heated steering wheel and voice-activated telephone, as well as, front fan-cooled and heated seats.

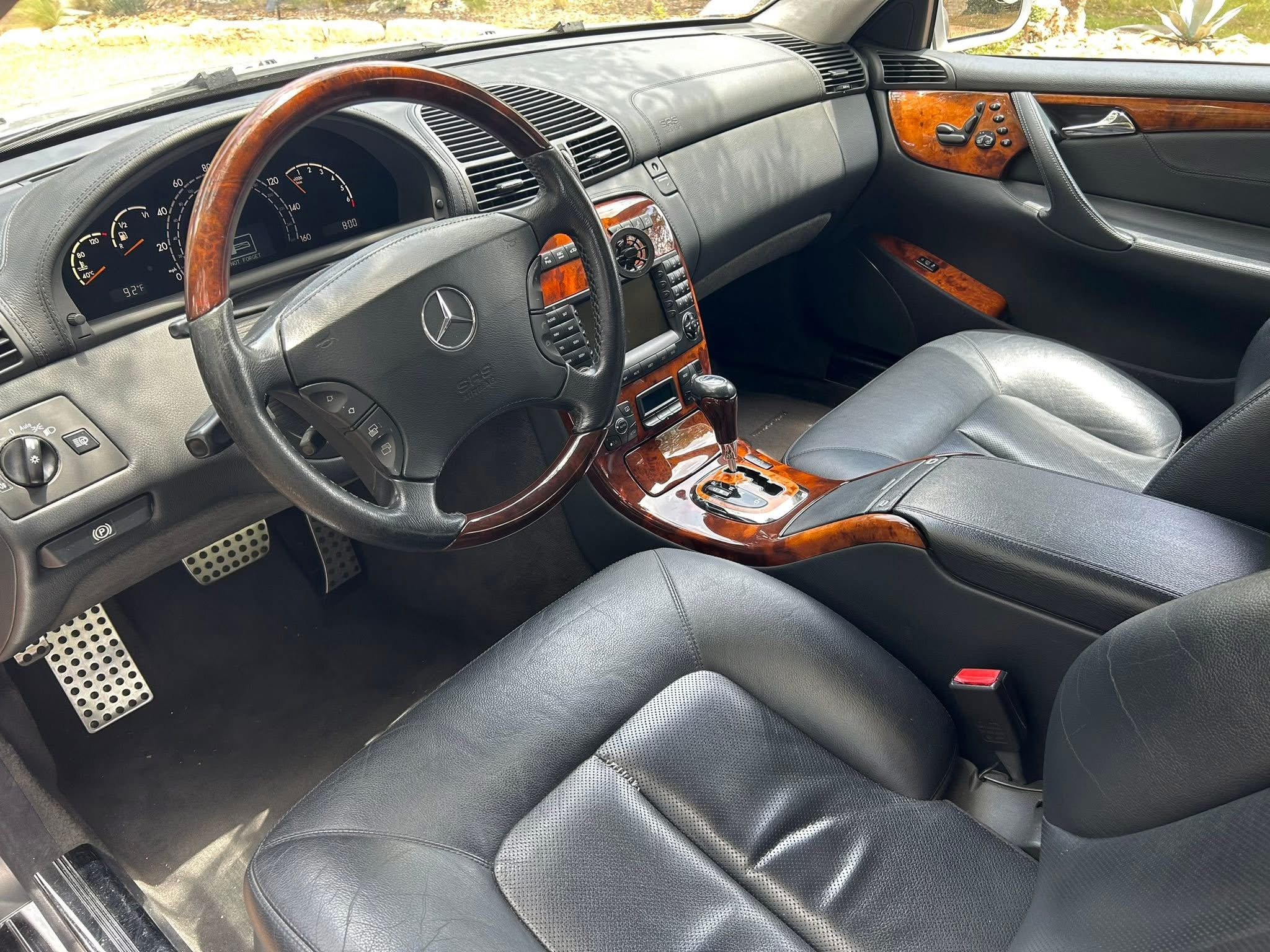
2005 CL 500 interior

The CL 63 AMG was produced only in November 2001 and just 26 examples were sold. The engine produced 438 bhp and 390 lb-ft of torque between 2,500 - 5,800 rpm, with a peak of 457 at 4,400 rpm. The V12-powered CL 63 AMG was only sold in Europe and Asia. Mercedes-Benz never offered the C215 CL63 for sale; all were sold exclusively through AMG.

Only 55 examples of thee 2000 CL 55 AMG F1 Edition were manufactured as a tribute to the modified Safety Car version used in Formula One during the 1999 and 2000 seasons. The engine was a naturally-aspirated 5.4-liter V8 producing 354 bhp at 5,500 rpm, and 391 ft lbs of torque at 4,100 rpm. It was reportedly the first production road car to feature carbon ceramic brakes, using ceramic Brembo vented and cross drilled disc brakes.

From 2000 through 2002, the V12-equipped cars featured a cylinder deactivation system marketed as Active Cylinder Control. The deactivation feature allowed improved fuel economy for the CL 600, compared to the CL 500, notably during highway driving where six-cylinder operation could activate. The V12 engine was not unlike two Mercedes six-cylinder series engines mated to a common crank with appropriate engine monitoring systems. However, cylinder deactivation was dropped with the introduction of the 500 PS (368 kW; 493 hp) bi-turbo V12.

Exclusive “Designo” packages featured custom color metallic paint, custom color Nappa leather interior and exotic wood trims, in three variants: Designo Cashmere, Designo Espresso and Designo Silver. Additional variants can be found on rarer models. An optional granite trim could be specified in lieu of wood trim.

In 2003, the engine options changed. The naturally aspirated V8 in the CL 55 AMG was replaced with a supercharged V8, allowing the car to accelerate from 0-60 mph in 4.27 seconds according to Motor Trend, while the CL 600's V12 had 2 turbochargers added and a slight displacement reduction, from 5980 cc to 5513 cc. Both cars produced 500 PS (368 kW; 493 hp), with the distinction being the quietness of the CL 600. The more powerful CL 65 AMG (2004-2006) produced 612 PS (450 kW; 604 hp). 2003 also saw the introduction of a new 7-speed 7G-Tronic automatic transmission for the CL 500 variant only.

=== Engines ===
As with all major German manufacturers (except Porsche), Mercedes electronically limits most of its cars to a top speed of 250 km/h (155 mph).

	Engine	Transmission	Power at rpm	Torque at rpm	0–100 km/h (62 mph)	Top speed*
CL 500 (1999)	5.0 L V8 M113	5-speed automatic (5G-Tronic)	225 kW (306 PS; 302 hp) at 5,500	460 N⋅m (339 lb⋅ft) at 2,700–4,250	6.5 seconds	250 km/h (155 mph)
CL 500 (2003)	5.0 L V8 M113	7-speed automatic (7G-Tronic)	225 kW (306 PS; 302 hp) at 5,600	460 N⋅m (339 lb⋅ft) at 2,700–4,250	6.3 seconds	250 km/h (155 mph)
CL 600 (2000)	5.8 L V12 M137	5-speed automatic (5G-Tronic)	270 kW (367 PS; 362 hp) at 5,500	530 N⋅m (391 lb⋅ft) at 4,100	6.3 seconds	250 km/h (155 mph)
CL 600 (2003)	Twin-turbocharged; 5.5 L V12 M275	5-speed automatic (5G-Tronic)	368 kW (500 PS; 493 hp) at 5,000	800 N⋅m (590 lb⋅ft) at 1,800–3,500	4.8 seconds	250 km/h (155 mph)
CL 55 AMG (2000-2002)	5.4 L V8 M113	5-speed automatic (5G-Tronic)	265 kW (360 PS; 355 hp)	530 N⋅m (391 lb⋅ft) at 3,150–4,500	6.0 seconds	250 km/h (155 mph)
CL 55 AMG (2003)	Supercharged; 5.4 L V8 M113	5-speed automatic (5G-Tronic)	368 kW (500 PS; 493 hp) at 6,100	700 N⋅m (516 lb⋅ft) at 2,750–4,000	4.8 seconds	250 km/h (155 mph)
CL 63 AMG	6.3 L V12 M137	5-speed automatic (5G-Tronic)	326 kW (443 PS; 437 hp)	620 N⋅m (457 lb⋅ft)	5.5 seconds	250 km/h (155 mph)
CL 65 AMG	Twin-turbocharged; 6.0L V12 M275 AMG	5-speed automatic (5G-Tronic)	450 kW (612 PS; 603 hp)	1,000 N⋅m (738 lb⋅ft)	4.4 seconds	250 km/h (155 mph)

* All are electronically limited

== Third generation (C216; 2006–2014) ==
Third generation
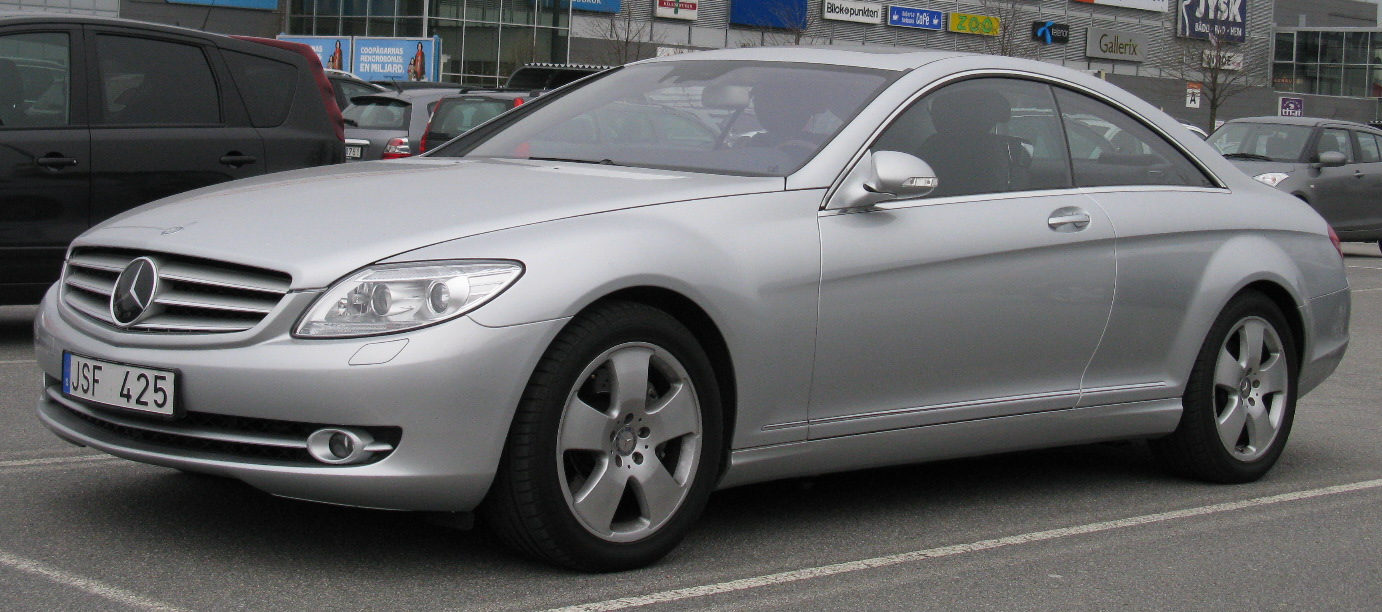

Overview
- Production: 2006–2013 (Worldwide); 2007–2014 (US)

Body and chassis
- Platform: Mercedes-Benz C216

Powertrain
- Engine: Petrol: 4.7 L V8 biturbo; 5.5 L V8; 5.5 L V8 biturbo; 6.2 L V8; 5.5 L V12 biturbo; 6.0 L V12 biturbo
- Transmission: 5-speed automatic 7-speed automatic

Dimensions
- Wheelbase: 2,955 mm (116.3 in)
- Length: 5,065 mm (199.4 in); AMG: 5,085 mm (200.2 in)
- Width: 1,872 mm (73.7 in)
- Height: 1,417 mm (55.8 in)

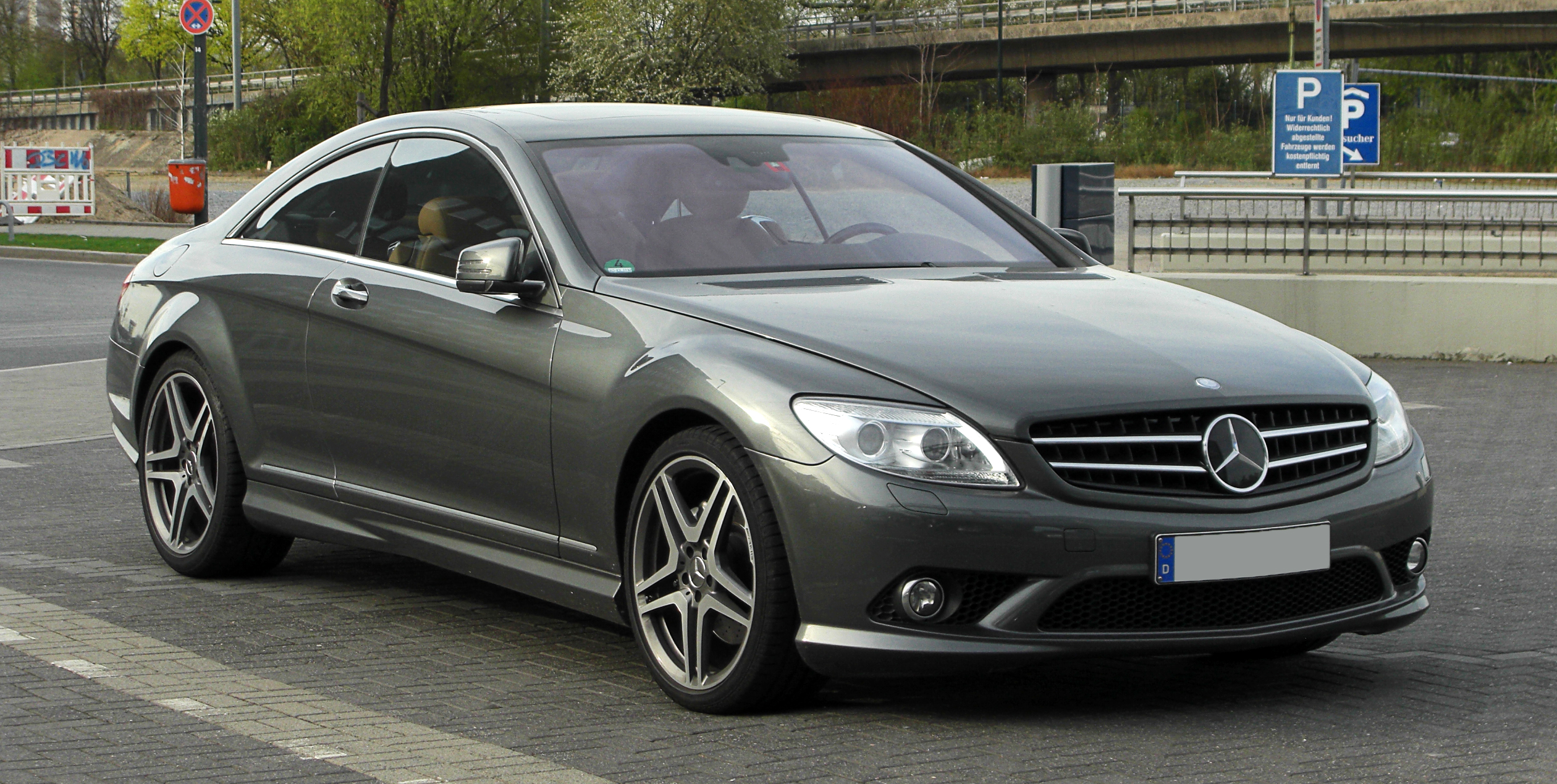
2011 Mercedes-Benz CL500 (pre-facelift)

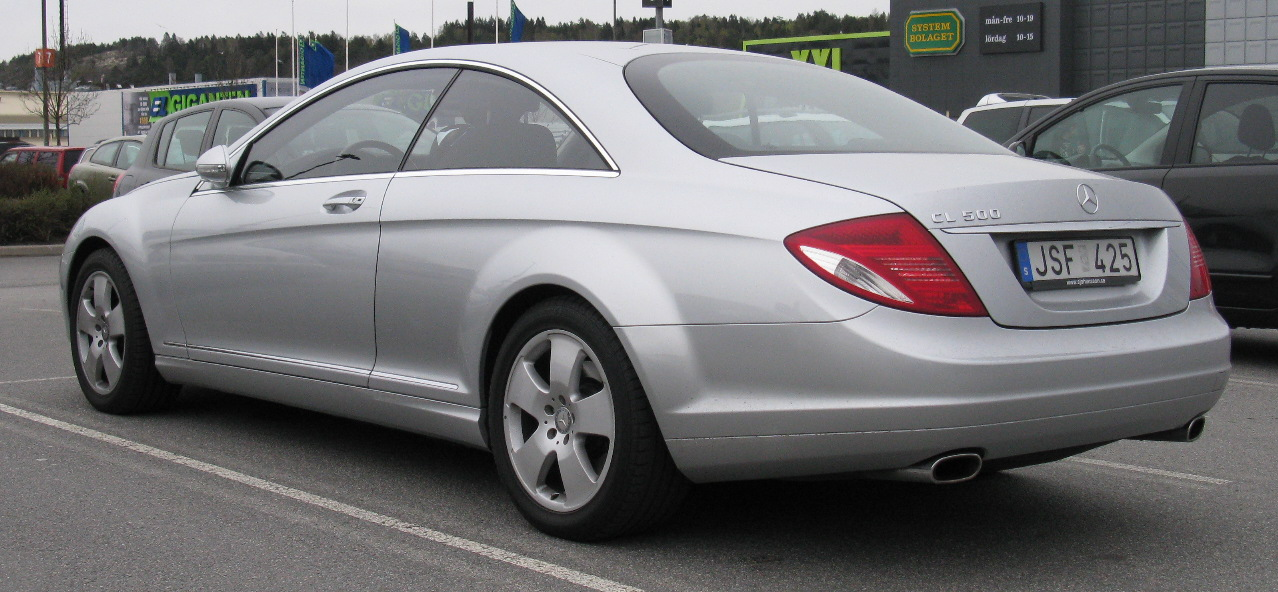
Mercedes-Benz CL 500 C216 (Sweden)

After 6 years of development, the new model was officially unveiled at the end of June 2006 and was presented at the 2006 Paris Motor Show. Like its predecessors, the C216 has no B-pillar between the front and rear side windows.

The W216 was offered in four variants, each with its own engine and transmission, the 5.5L V8-powered CL 550 (available with 4MATIC all-wheel drive, which was standard in Canada and the USA), the high-performance 6.2L V8-powered CL 63 AMG (with optional performance package variant) and the ultra-luxury twin-turbo 5.5L V12-powered CL 600 and, lastly, the top-of-the-line CL 65 AMG with a twin-turbo 6.0L V12 engine. The CL 500 was sold as the CL 550 in some markets (particularly Canada and the USA). The W216 CL-Class is based on the chassis of the W221 S-Class, which shares the same powertrains, although there are V6 and hybrid engines for the W221 not available for the W216.

The two-door CL coupé weighs 2,045 kg (4,508 lb), being heavier than the equivalent S saloon, and rides on a full-size 116.3-inch wheelbase (albeit 8.2 inches less than the long wheelbase S-Class, which was the only S-Class sold in the U.S.). Despite its large size, rear seat legroom was limited in keeping in the tradition of 2+2 luxury coupés, though CL has more rear passenger space than its rivals. The CL's trunk was as large as that of the Audi A8 flagship saloon.

The C216 makes use of the Distronic Plus cruise control, which debuted on the 2007 S-Class. This system was able to bring the car to a complete stop, and accelerate again to the pre-set speed, to keep a pre-set distance away from the car ahead of it. This generation of CL also debuted with the new Active NightVision program that enables drivers to view the conditions in front of the car despite the dark surroundings.

In 2007, 40 C216 CL 65 AMG units were sold as the 40th Anniversary Edition, to celebrate AMG's founding 40 years earlier. The '40th Anniversary Edition' was based on the CL 65 AMG. Changes included a 'ONE OUT OF 40' badge near the COMAND controller, special upholstery and rooflining, and a special 'AMG Alubeam' paint finish. Apart from the CL 65 AMG 40th Anniversary Edition, only a small selection of showcars got an Alubeam finish, a special paint designed to gleam like liquid metal.

=== 2010 update ===
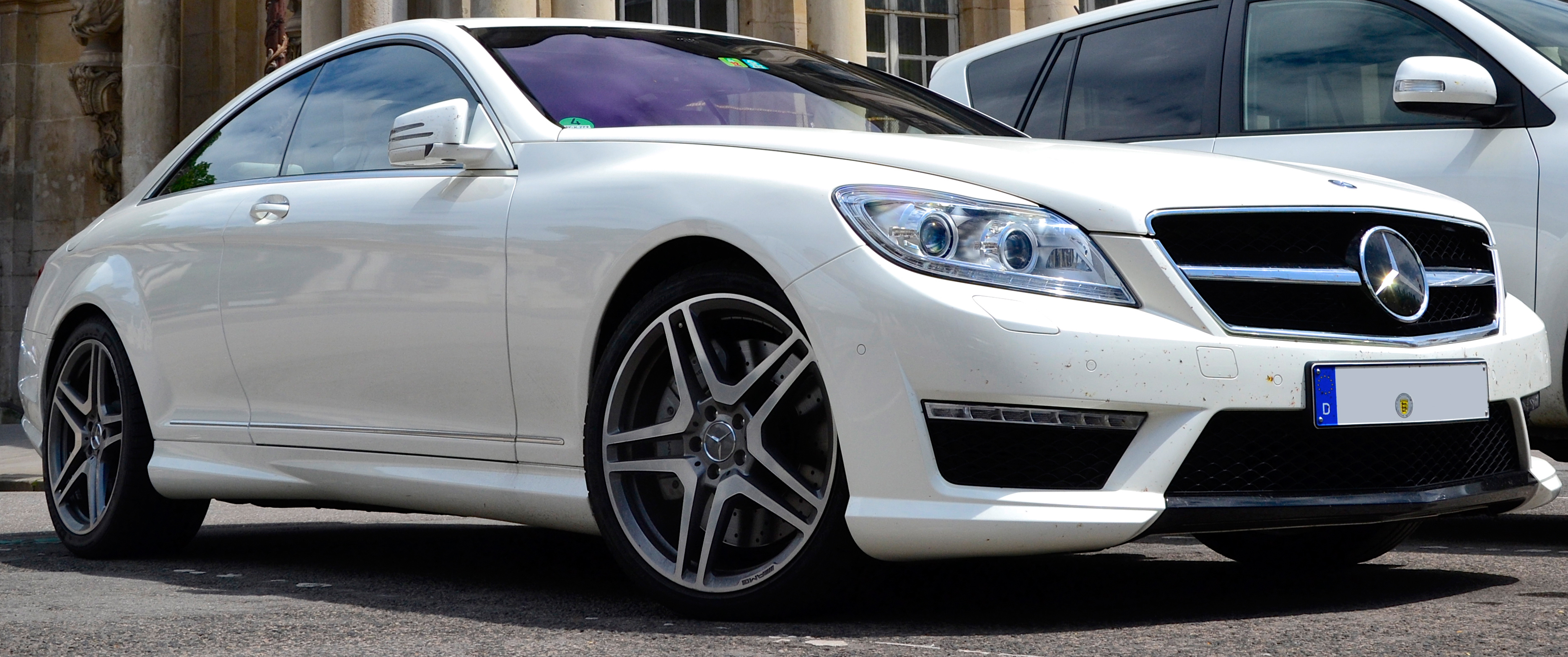
Facelift Mercedes-Benz CL63 AMG

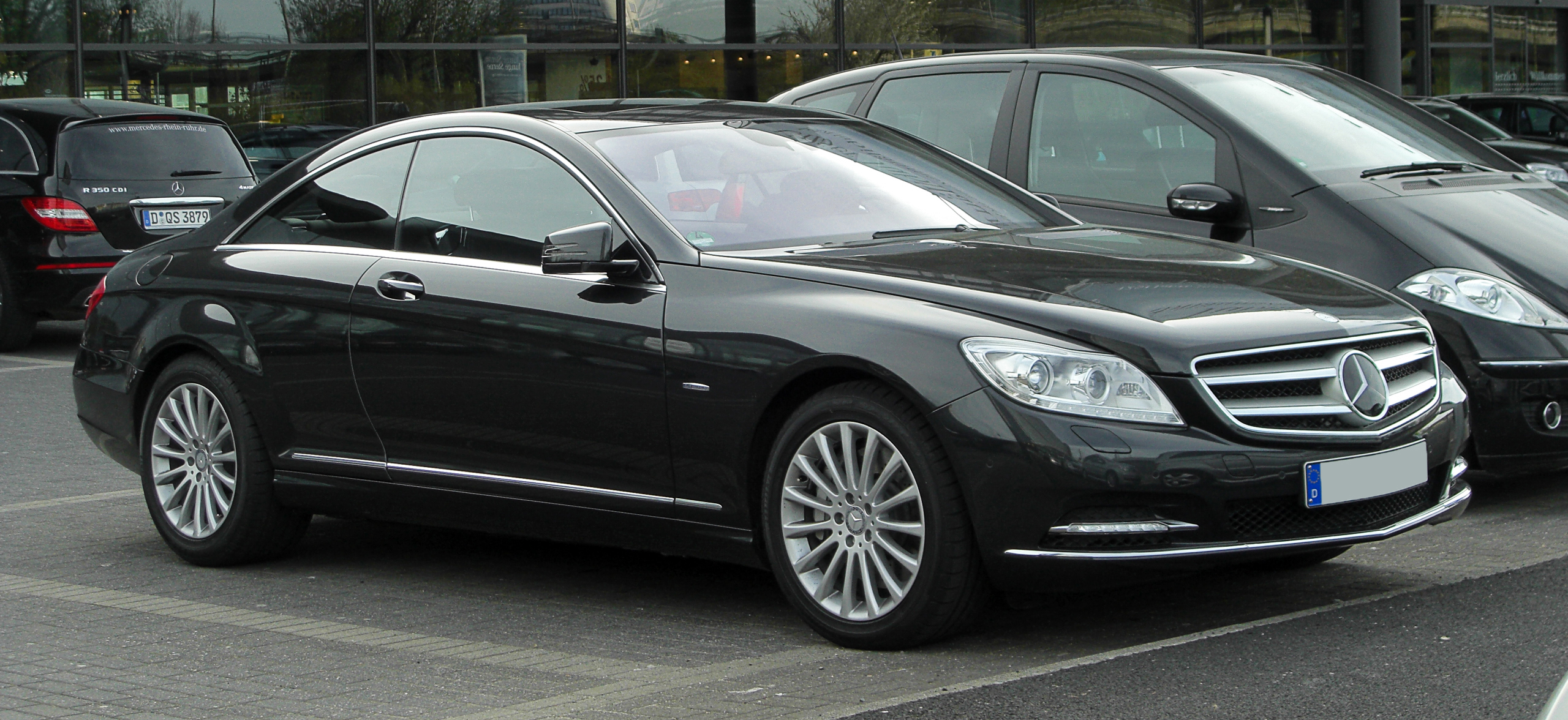
Facelift Mercedes-Benz CL 500 BlueEFFICIENCY (Europe)

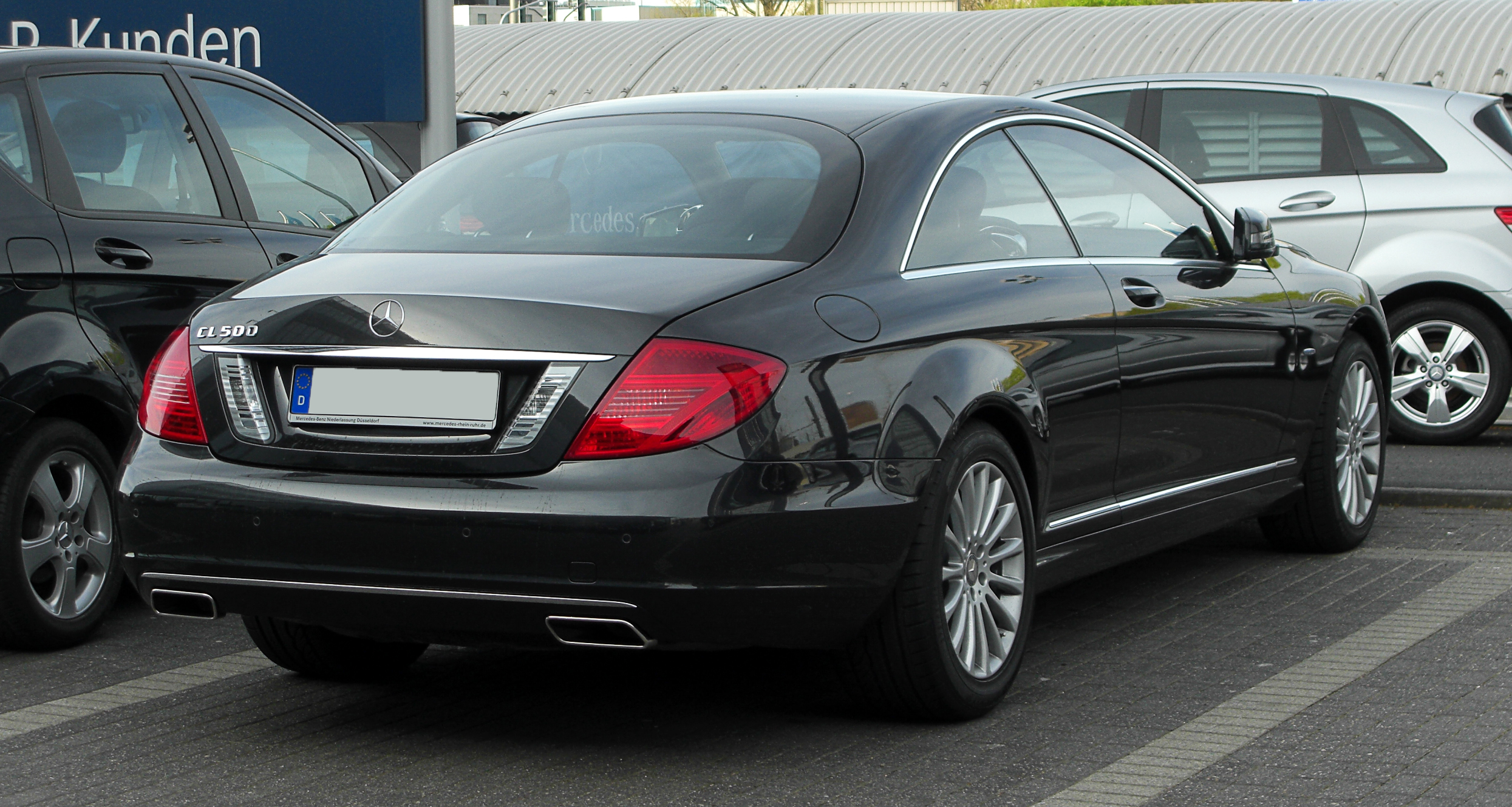
Facelift Mercedes-Benz CL 500 BlueEFFICIENCY (Europe)

The facelift version of the Mercedes CL-Class made its world debut in July 2010 at the Goodwood Festival of Speed. The new CL-Class comes with an improved exterior and interior, but the biggest changes are found under the hood. The exterior gets a new grille, bi-xenon headlights with LED technology, LED fog lamps, revised fenders and hood, and new exhaust pipes. For the interior the biggest change is the addition of a new wood trim. The new CL-Class was also offered with new technologies including: Active Blind Spot Assist, Attention Assist, Active Lane Keeping Assist, Night View Assist Plus, and Active Body Control.

The model line-up starts with the entry-level CL 500 (550 in the US) powered by the new 4.7 L (4,663cc) V8 direct-injected engine that produces 435 PS (320 kW; 429 hp) and 700 N⋅m (516 lb⋅ft) of torque, paired to a new seven-speed automatic transmission, which allows it to accelerate from 0 to 60 mph in 4.9 seconds. The CL 600 retains the twin-turbo 5.5 L V12 engine and five-speed automatic with a total output of 517 PS (380 kW; 510 hp) and 830 N⋅m (612 lb⋅ft) of torque. It can accelerate from 0 to 60 mph in 4.0 seconds. Both vehicles are limited to 250 km/h. The CL 63 AMG was powered by a new direct injection, 5.5-litre V8 engine (a larger displacement version of the CL 550's) mated to a 7-speed MCT dual-clutch transmission with a total output of 525 PS (386 kW; 518 hp) and 800 N⋅m (590 lb⋅ft) of torque. The CL 65 AMG's V12 engine has been tweaked to produce 630 PS (463 kW; 621 hp) and 1,000 N⋅m (738 lb⋅ft) of torque, mated to a five-speed automatic with AMG SpeedShift.

The last generation of the CL-Class, C216, was available in five models: CL 500 (CL 550 in some markets, with standard 4MATIC in Canada and the USA), CL 600, CL 63 AMG, CL 63 AMG (S) and CL 65 AMG. The CL 65 AMG was the most powerful model of the CL and the most expensive Mercedes-branded vehicle, slightly edging out its S-Class equivalent S 65 AMG and the SLS. CL sales were the third-lowest of Mercedes-Benz in North America at the time with under 1400 units sold in 2006, as only the G-Class four-wheel drive and two-seat SLS AMG sell smaller numbers; annual CL sales equalled Ford truck sales for one day. However, this exclusivity was considered attractive to CL buyers.

	Engine	Power	Torque	0–100 km/h (62 mph)	Top speed
CL 550	4.7 L V8 BiTurbo	320 kW (435 PS; 429 hp)	700 N⋅m (516 lb⋅ft)	4.8 seconds	250 km/h (155 mph)
CL 550 4MATIC	4.7 L V8 BiTurbo	320 kW (435 PS; 429 hp)	700 N⋅m (516 lb⋅ft)	4.8 seconds	250 km/h (155 mph)
CL 600	5.5 L V12 BiTurbo	380 kW (517 PS; 510 hp)	830 N⋅m (612 lb⋅ft)	4.4 seconds (4.1 seconds R&T)	250 km/h (155 mph)
CL 63 AMG	5.5 L V8 BiTurbo	400 kW (544 PS; 536 hp)	800 N⋅m (590 lb⋅ft)	4.4 seconds	250 km/h (155 mph)
CL 63 AMG Performance Package	5.5 L V8 BiTurbo	420 kW (571 PS; 563 hp)	900 N⋅m (664 lb⋅ft)	4.3 seconds	300 km/h (186 mph)
CL 65 AMG	6.0 L V12 BiTurbo	450 kW (612 PS; 603 hp)	1,000 N⋅m (738 lb⋅ft)	4.1 seconds	250 km/h (155 mph)

== Sales ==
Calendar year	US sales
2001	3,748
2002	3,938
2003	3,377
2004	2,683
2005	1,320
2006	1,312
2007	3,672
2008	2,733
2009	1,220
2010	1,035
2011	943
2012	723

== See also ==
- Bentley Continental GT
- Lexus LC
