= Mercedes-Benz M119 engine =

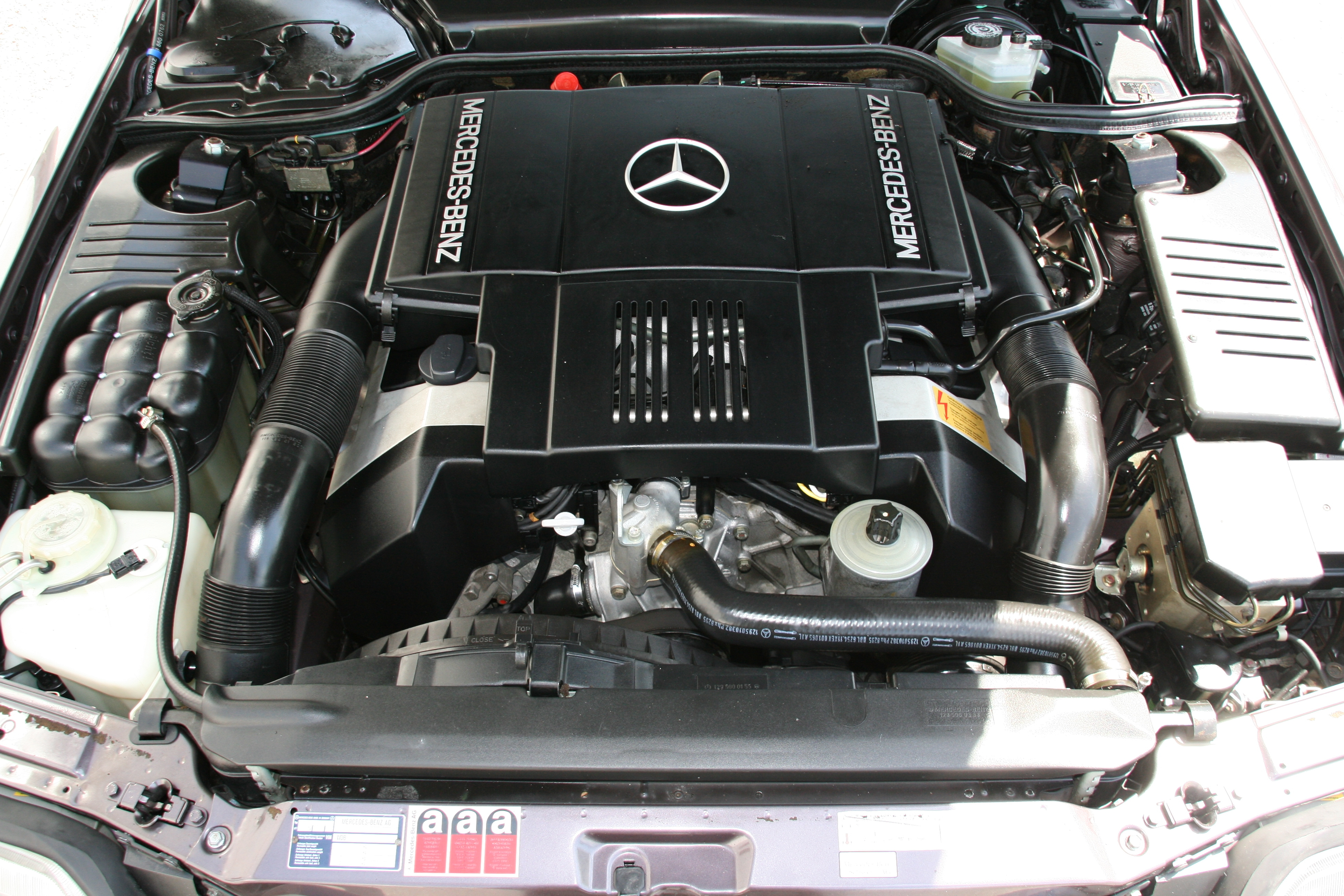

Overview
- Manufacturer: Mercedes-Benz
- Production: 1989–1999

Layout
- Configuration: 90° V8
- Displacement: 4.2 L (4,196 cc); 5.0 L (4,973 cc); 6.0 L (5,956 cc); 6.4 L (6,410 cc)
- Cylinder bore: 92 mm (3.62 in); 96.5 mm (3.80 in); 100 mm (3.94 in)
- Piston stroke: 78.9 mm (3.11 in); 85 mm (3.35 in); 94.8 mm (3.73 in)
- Cylinder head material: Aluminium
- Valvetrain: DOHC 4 valves x cyl. and VVT
- Compression ratio: 10.0:1, 11.0:1

Combustion
- Turbocharger: In some 5.0 L racing versions
- Fuel system: Fuel injection
- Fuel type: Petrol
- Cooling system: Water cooled

Output
- Power output: 279–960 hp (283–973 PS; 208–716 kW)
- Torque output: 400–1,085 N⋅m (295–800 lb⋅ft)

Chronology
- Predecessor: Mercedes-Benz M117
- Successor: Mercedes-Benz M113

The Mercedes-Benz M119 is a V8 automobile petrol engine produced from 1989 through 1999. It was available in 4.2 L; 5.0 L; and 6.0 L displacements. It was a double overhead cam design with 4 valves per cylinder and variable valve timing on the intake side. It was replaced by the 3-valve M113 starting in 1997.

The M119 differed from the M117 in the following ways:

- The engine block uses asbestos-free gaskets and has better oil flow
- The cylinder head is now a 4-valve aluminium unit with dual overhead camshafts
- The connecting rods are forged and enable cooling of the pistons with sprayed oil
- The pistons are iron-coated cast aluminium
- An improved vibration damper system is used
- The aluminium oil pan has bolted-on oil baffles to prevent foaming of the engine oil
- The intake camshaft timing is adjusted hydro-mechanically up to 20°:
  - 0–2000 rpm — retarded for improved idle and cylinder scavenging
  - 2000–4700 rpm — advanced for increased torque
  - 4700+ rpm — retarded for improved volumetric efficiency

== Engine Data ==
Engine code	Bore × stroke	Displacement	Compression	Power at [rpm]	Years manufactured	Torque at [rpm]
M 119 E 42	92 mm × 78.9 mm (3.62 in × 3.11 in)	4.2 L (4,196 cc)	10.0:1	268 hp (272 PS; 200 kW) at 5,700 (US-Version) - Ratings conflict in factory documents	1992	400 N⋅m (295 lb⋅ft) at 3,900
M 119 E 42	92 mm × 78.9 mm (3.62 in × 3.11 in)	4.2 L (4,196 cc)	10.0:1	282 hp (286 PS; 210 kW) at 5,700	1991-1993	400 N⋅m (295 lb⋅ft) at 3,900
M 119 E 42	92 mm × 78.9 mm (3.62 in × 3.11 in)	4.2 L (4,196 cc)	11.0:1	275 hp (279 PS; 205 kW) at 5,700	1993-1999	400 N⋅m (295 lb⋅ft) at 3,900
M 119 E 50	96.5 mm × 85 mm (3.80 in × 3.35 in)	5.0 L (4,973 cc)	10.0:1	316 hp (320 PS; 236 kW) at 5,600	1993-1999	470 N⋅m (347 lb⋅ft) at 3,900
M 119 E 50	96.5 mm × 85 mm (3.80 in × 3.35 in)	5.0 L (4,973 cc)	10.0:1	322 hp (326 PS; 240 kW) at 5,700	1989-1992	480 N⋅m (354 lb⋅ft) at 3,900
M 119 E 50	96.5 mm × 85 mm (3.80 in × 3.35 in)	5.0 L (4,973 cc)	11.0:1	342 hp (347 PS; 255 kW) at 5,750	1996-1997	480 N⋅m (354 lb⋅ft) at3,750–4,250
M 119 E 60	100 mm × 94.8 mm (3.94 in × 3.73 in)	6.0 L (5,956 cc)	10.0:1	369 hp (374 PS; 275 kW) at 5,250	1996-1999	550 N⋅m (406 lb⋅ft) at 4,000
M 119 E 60	100 mm × 94.8 mm (3.94 in × 3.73 in)	6.0 L (5,956 cc)	10.0:1	375 hp (380 PS; 280 kW) at 5,500	1993-1994	580 N⋅m (428 lb⋅ft) at 3,750

== 4.2 ==
The 4.2 L (4,196 cc) version (M119.975) produced 275 hp (279 PS; 205 kW) at 5700 rpm and 400 N⋅m (295 lb⋅ft) of torque at 3900 rpm. Early versions of W140 400SE/400SEL (and potentially W124 400E for USA and Japan) produced 286 PS (210 kW; 282 bhp) at 5700 rpm and 410 N⋅m (302 lb⋅ft) of torque at 3900 rpm. Rare Japanese version 400E 4.2 AMG (16-20 cars) has 312 PS (229 kW; 308 bhp).

Applications:

- W124 400 E / E 420
- W124 400E 4.2 AMG
- W210 E 420
- W140 400 SE / 400 SEL / S 420
- C140 420 SEC / S 420 Coupé / CL 420

== 5.0 ==
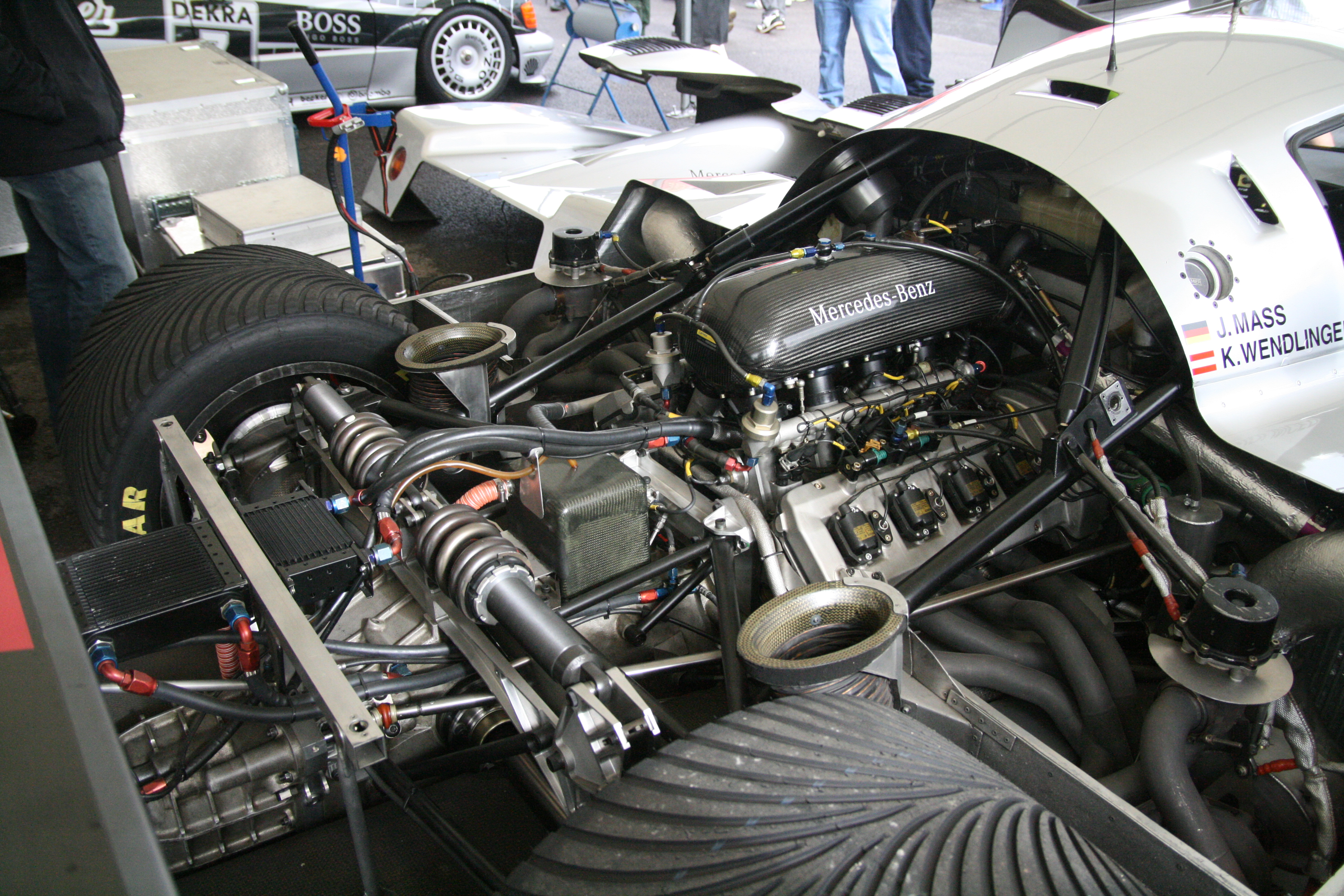
A twin-turbocharged M119 installed in a Mercedes-Benz C11 Group C race car.

The 5.0 L (4,973 cc) version produced 326 PS (240 kW; 322 bhp) at 5700 rpm and 480 N⋅m (354 lb⋅ft) of torque at 3900 rpm. Later engines had the full throttle enrichment removed and power was a little less, to 316 hp (320 PS; 236 kW). The E50 AMG M119.985 produced 347 PS (255 kW; 342 hp) @ 5,550 rpm and 480 N⋅m (354 lb⋅ft) @ 3,200 rpm.

Applications:

- W124 500E / E500
- W140 500SE / 500SEL / S500
- C140 500SEC / S500 Coupe / CL500
- R129 500SL / SL500
- W210 E50 AMG
- CLK LM (with naturally aspirated version of M119 engine)
- Sauber C9 (with biturbo)
- Mercedes-Benz C11 (with biturbo)
- De La Chapelle Parcours (2 of 3, 1 concept and 1 production car)

The 5.0 L M119 replaced the M120 V12 in the CLK-GTR race car, for the new generation CLK-LM which then won every race in the FIA GT series, which ultimately resulted in the GT1 class being canceled.

It also won the 1989 24 Hours of Le Mans in the Sauber C9 and was further used in the Mercedes-Benz C11 before being replaced by the M291 in 1991.

== 6.0 ==
The M119 fitted into AMG models produced around 375 hp (380 PS; 280 kW) to 415 PS (305 kW; 409 hp) and 580 N⋅m (428 lb⋅ft) of torque.

- E 60 AMG (W124)
- SL 60 AMG (R129)
- E 60 AMG (W210)

For 1994 model year, there were also limited AMG models for Japan which were sold between October 1993 and September 1999 in left-hand drive. Installed engine was M119.970 which displaced 6.0 L (5,956 cc), power 381 PS (280 kW; 376 hp), and 59.1 kg⋅m (580 N⋅m; 427 lb⋅ft) of torque.

- 500 GE 6.0 AMG (W463)
- S 500 6.0 AMG (W140)
- CL 500 6.0 AMG (C140)
