= Mercedes-Benz W140 =

Mercedes-Benz S-Class model manufactured from 1991 to 1998

Mercedes-Benz W140/C140
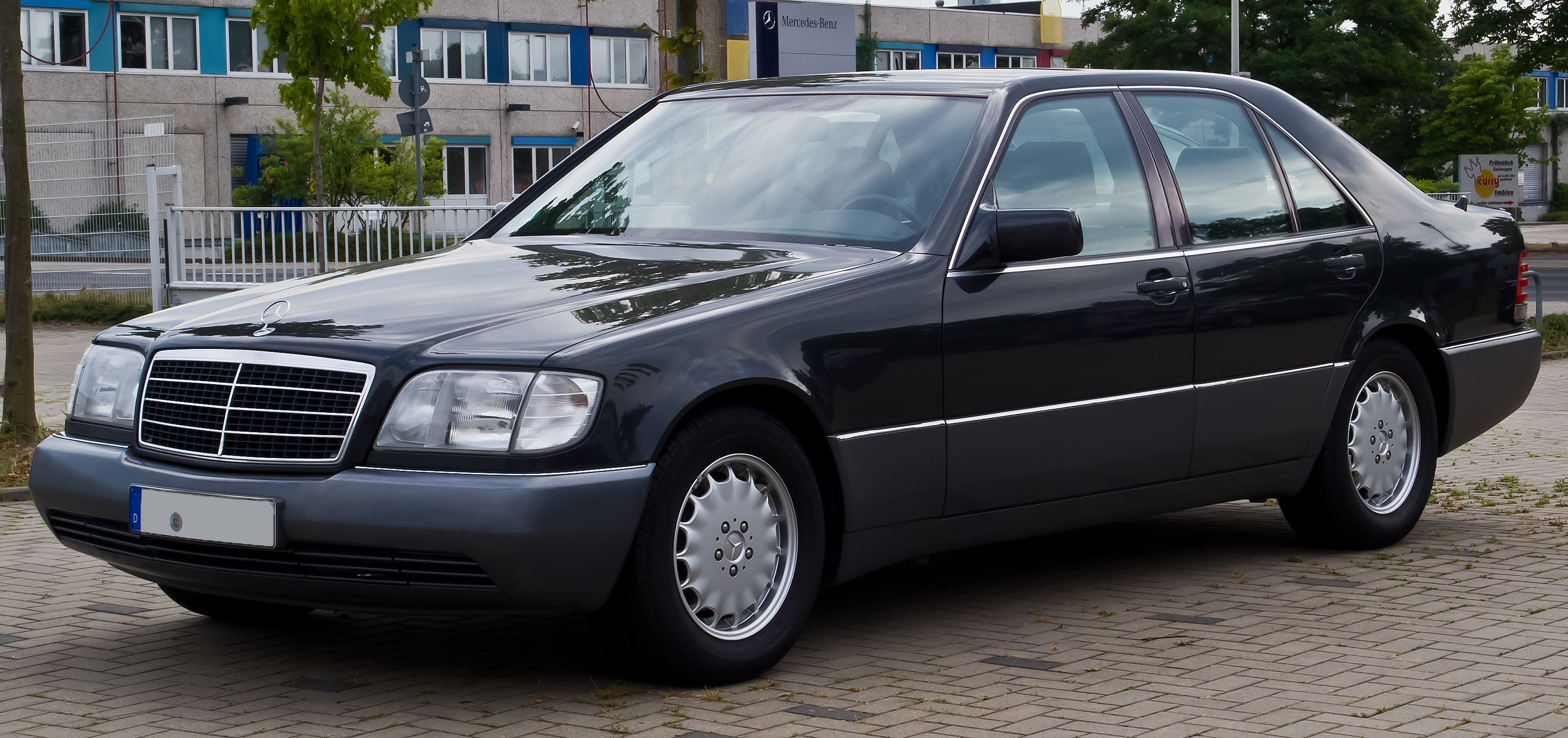
- Mercedes-Benz S Class (W140) facelift

Overview
- Manufacturer: Daimler-Benz
- Production: April 1991 – September 1998 (saloon); October 1992 – September 1998 (coupé)
- Model years: 1992–1998 (Worldwide); 1992–1999 (North America)
- Assembly: Germany: Stuttgart
- Designer: Olivier Boulay (Saloon exterior: 1986; Coupe exterior: 1987); Bruno Sacco (design director 1982–1990)

Body and chassis
- Class: Full-size luxury car (F)
- Body style: 4-door saloon (W140; short); 4-door saloon (V140; long); 4-door saloon (VV140; Pullman); 2-door coupé (C140)
- Layout: FR layout
- Related: Maybach 57 and 62

Powertrain
- Engine: Petrol: 2.8 – 3.2 L M104 I6; 4.2 – 5.0 L M119 V8; 6.0 L M120 V12; 7.1 – 7.3 L M120 AMG V12; Diesel: 3.0 L OM606 turbo I6; 3.5 L OM603 turbo I6
- Transmission: 5-speed manual 4-speed 4G-Tronic automatic 5-speed 4G-Tronic automatic 5-speed 5G-Tronic automatic

Dimensions
- Wheelbase: W140: 3,040 mm (119.7 in); V140: 3,140 mm (123.6 in); C140: 2,945 mm (115.9 in); VV140: 4,140 mm (163.0 in)
- Length: W140: 5,113 mm (201.3 in); V140: 5,213 mm (205.2 in); C140: 5,065 mm (199.4 in); VV140: 6,228 mm (245.2 in)
- Width: W140: 1,886 mm (74.3 in); C140: 1,895 mm (74.6 in)
- Height: W140: 1,486 mm (58.5 in); C140: 1,427 mm (56.2 in)
- Curb weight: W140: 1,890–2,180 kg (4,167–4,806 lb); V140: 1,900–2,190 kg (4,189–4,828 lb); C140: 2,060–2,240 kg (4,542–4,938 lb)

Chronology
- Predecessor: Mercedes-Benz W126
- Successor: Mercedes-Benz W220 (sedan); Mercedes-Benz C215 (coupé)

The Mercedes-Benz W140 is a series of flagship vehicles manufactured by Mercedes-Benz from 1991 to 1998 in sedan/saloon and coupe body styles and two wheelbase lengths (SE and SEL). Mercedes-Benz unveiled the W140 S-Class at the Geneva International Motor Show in March 1991, with the sales starting in April 1991 and North American launch was on 6 August 1991.

All models were renamed in June 1993 as part of the corporate-wide nomenclature changes for 1994 model year on, becoming "S" regardless of wheelbase length or body style as well as fuel type. Diesel models carried a TURBODIESEL trunk/boot lid label. In 1996, the S-Class coupé was renamed again as CL-Class into its own model range.

The W140 series S-Class was superseded by the W220 S-Class sedan and C215 CL-Class coupé in 1998 after an eight-year production run. Production of the W140 reached 432,732, with 406,710 sedans and 26,022 coupes.

== History ==
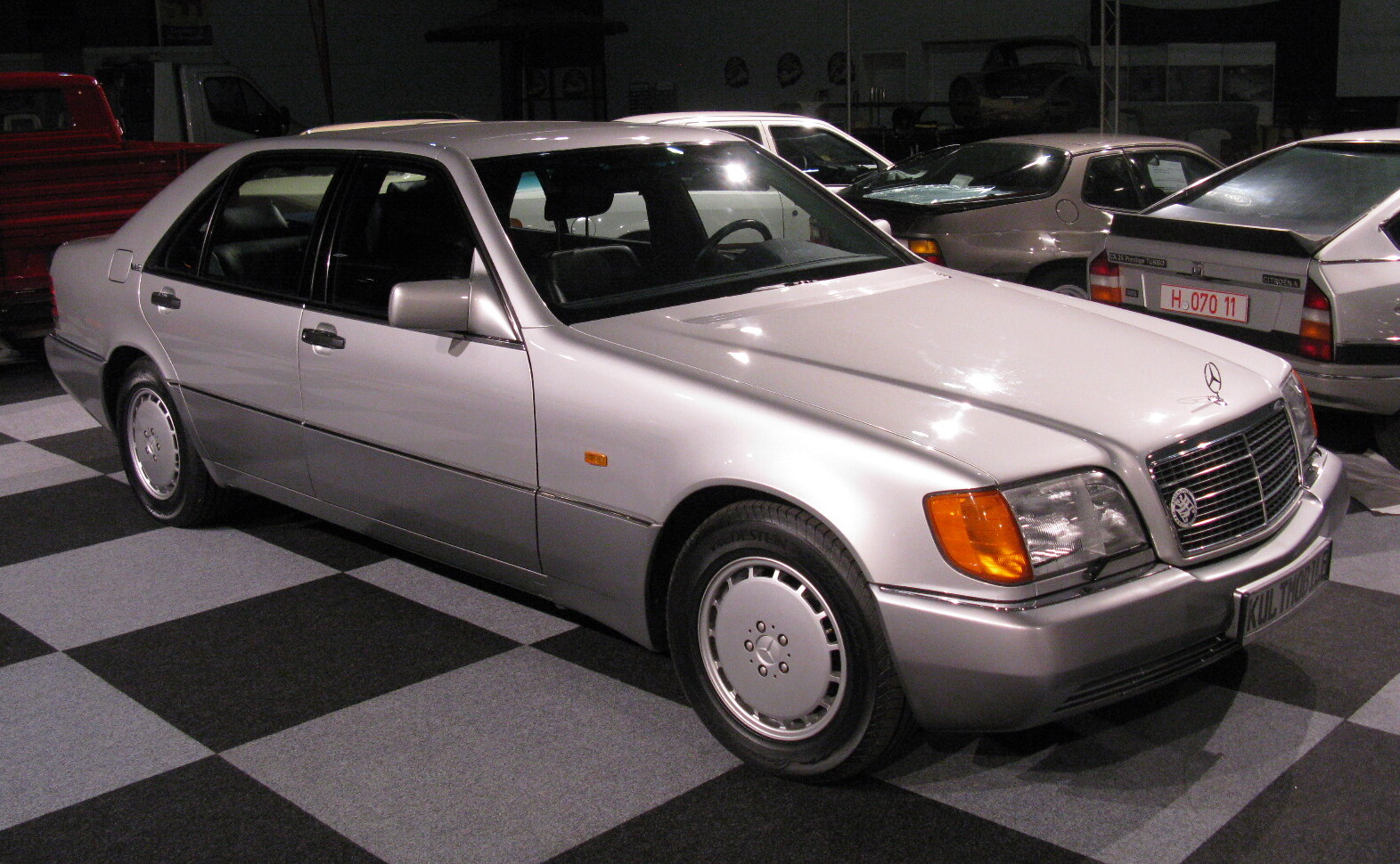
1991–1993 S-Class (W140) pre-facelift

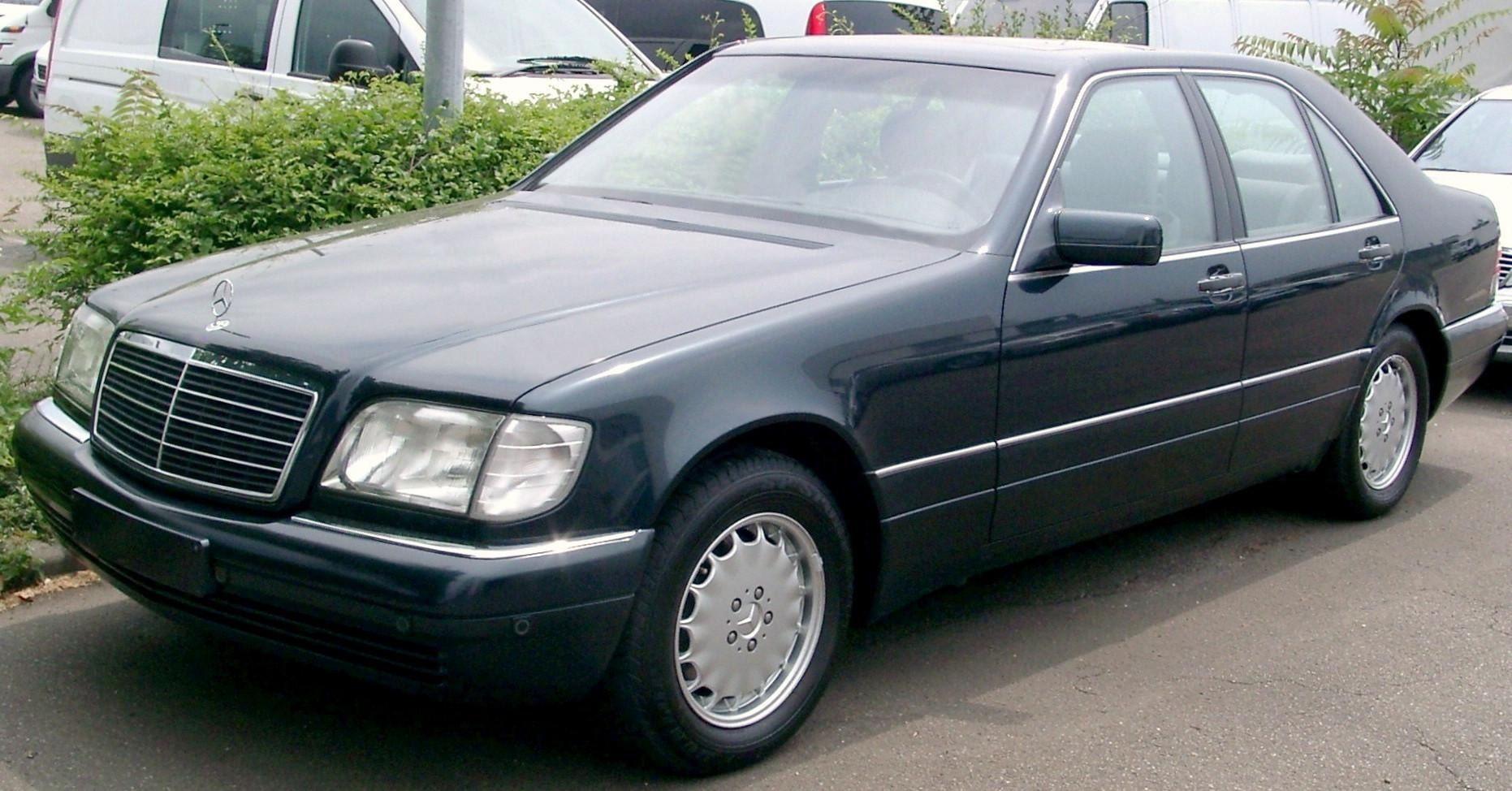
1994–1998 S-Class (W140) facelift

Development of the W140 began in 1981, with official introduction originally set for September 1989. Several different design proposals were studied from 1982 until 1986, when a definitive design proposal by Olivier Boulay was selected on 9 December 1986. Several engineering prototypes were evaluated from early 1987, with the final exterior design locked in September 1987. The design patents were filed on 23 February 1988 in West Germany and 23 August 1988 in the United States. The lead designer Bruno Sacco attributed Jaguar's XJ40 saloon and BMW's E32 7-Series as a major influence on the W140's design. The initial exterior design proposal called for the two different cooling grille designs to denote the lower and upper model, similar to the idea of round and rectangle headlamps on the W123 (1976-1985). Innovative metal-forming technology allowed the extension of the engine hood/bonnet to the front bumper, with the grille placed inside the extruded metal. The W140 became the second model after the R129 (1989-2001) to have this extruded metal grille.

When BMW introduced a new 7-Series (E32) in 1986, the first post-war German passenger V12 engine (M70) was offered. This surprise announcement forced Mercedes-Benz to delay the introduction of the W140 by eighteen months to 1991. The delay allowed Mercedes-Benz to develop the new V12 engine and to rearrange the engine bay to accommodate the larger V12 engine, along with upgrading the brake system. The final development prototypes were completed in June 1990, with pilot production models being built from June 1990 to January 1991.

The project's cost overruns and eighteen-month delay resulted in the departure of Wolfgang Peter, the chief engineer of Mercedes-Benz. The price of a W140 was considerably higher than its predecessor, the W126 (up to 25 per cent), leading to slow sales during the recession of 1990-1994.

The slow sales of the W140 can also be attributed to a wave of Japanese luxury cars that were introduced before the W140 was launched. While the base price of a six-cylinder 300SE was $71,500 in 1992, the Lexus LS400 started at $44,300, the Infiniti Q45 started at $43,600, and the Acura Legend started at $28,800. This led many prospective W140 buyers to switch to its Japanese competitors due to their lower prices, lower maintenance costs, and in the case of the LS400, an ownership experience that was considered just as good if not better than its European competitors.

As a result of the price increases and stiff competition, Mercedes-Benz shifted from "engineer's design" to "market-driven design" in the 1990s. Many enthusiasts argue that the W140 was the "last true S-Class," as its successor, the W220, was criticized for having inferior engineering, and in the case of early models, poor reliability.

Two engines, a stillborn V16 engine based on an elongated V12 engine and an 8.0 W18 engine meant for a hypothetical 800 SEL/S 800 were, again, developed in response to the purported rumour of BMW exploring a V16 engine and testing it in a 7-Series (E32) mule, named Goldfisch V16. The W18 did not proceed past the blueprint stage, but Mercedes-Benz had a small fleet of 85 W140 prototypes with V16 engines. Due to the increasing concern for climate protection and fear of sending a wrong message to the public in the early 1990s, the V16 engine was quietly cancelled.

In March 1994, the updated W140 was unveiled at the 1994 Geneva Auto Salon and went on sale in April 1994.

In 1995, the two tone exterior appearance was made to be monotone, low-beam xenon headlamps were added and the rear indicator lenses became clear. The change was later introduced in June 1996 as 1996.5 models in Europe and 1997 models in the United States.

The W140 received notoriety in 1997 when Diana, Princess of Wales died in a car crash, involving an S 280 model, in a Paris tunnel. The car also received attention when Eduard Shevardnadze, President of Georgia, was hit by an RPG while travelling in the car and survived.

The W140 S-Class was notable for being the first Mercedes-Benz model to be sold in the United States with ECE (Economic Commission for Europe) headlamps. United States had revised its FMVSS 108 to allow the ECE headlamps and H4 (designated as HB2) and H1 bulbs.

== Models ==
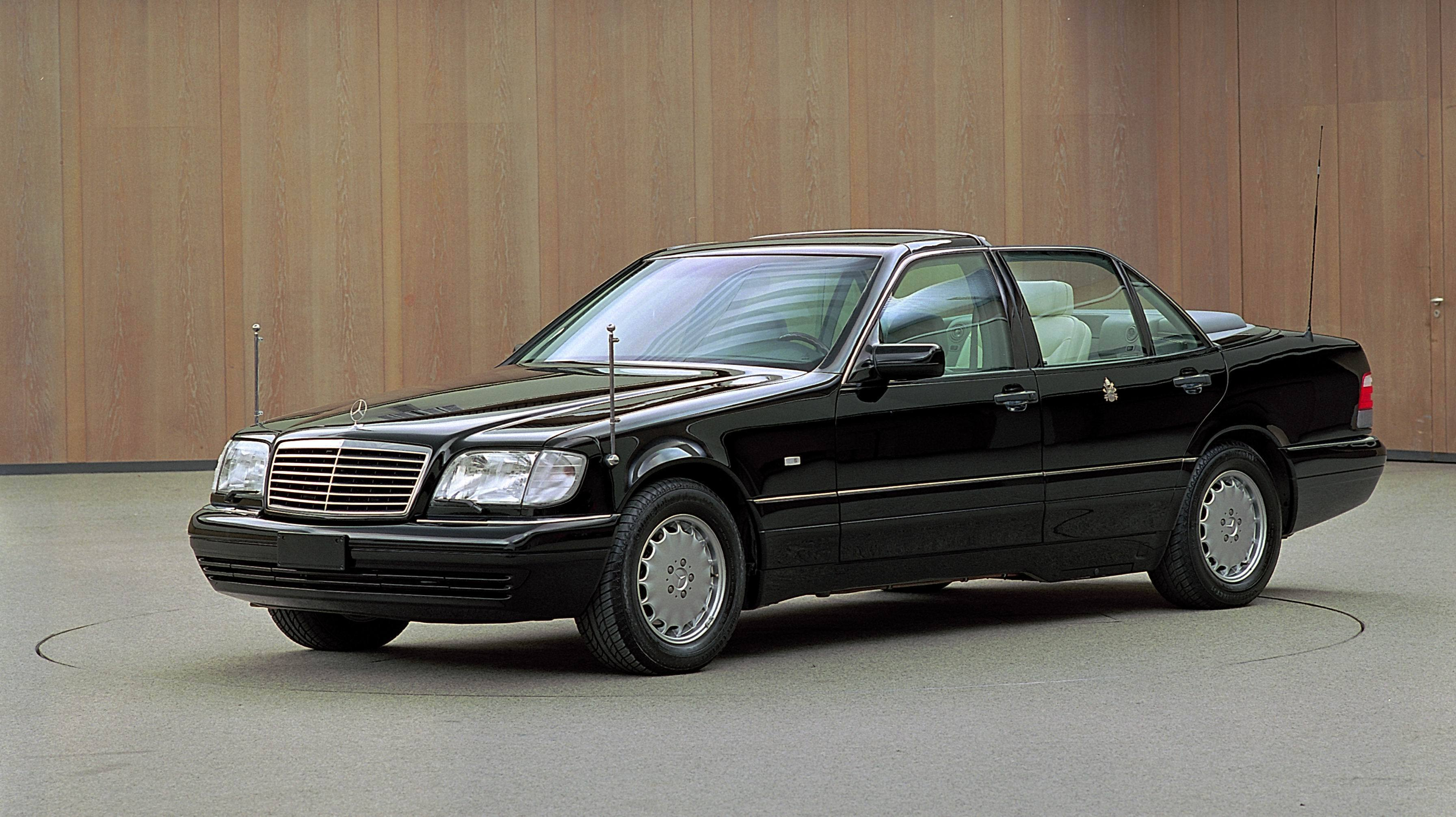
The papal S 500 Landaulet

The three body types are carried over from the W126: four-door sedan/saloon in two wheelbase lengths and one two-door coupé. The model types are assigned as W140 for standard wheelbase, V140 for long wheelbase, and C140 for coupé. In 1996, the S-Class coupé was renamed as CL-Class and spun off from the S-Class. A longer Pullman version with 4140 mm wheelbase was introduced in 1995 with two engine choices (S 500 Pullman and S 600 Pullman). The S 600 Pullman could be ordered with an armour package.

The Sultan of Brunei ordered eighteen S 73 T station wagons/estates with AMG-prepared M120 7.3-litre V12 engines producing 391 kW (532 PS; 524 hp) and 750 N⋅m (550 lb⋅ft) to be built, with ten units delivered. The S 73 T had either an S-Class coupé front end or the normal S-Class sedan front, and the rear part of an S210 station wagon/estate installed, and taillights from the S-Class sedan.

A one-off custom-built S 500 lang Landaulet Popemobile was built for Pope John Paul II in 1997.

== Features ==
=== Safety ===
The W140 S-Class introduced a number of safety innovations.

- Braking system. The V8 and V12 W140 models distributed more braking power to the rear wheels, increasing stopping effectiveness. In 1996, the W140 received Brake Assist System BAS, which engaged during emergency maneuvers to boost braking power to maximum.
- Electronic Stability Program (ESP) was introduced in 1995 on the Mercedes-Benz S 600 Coupé. ESP used on-board computers to improve vehicle handling response during difficult driving conditions. This was a Mercedes developed system, which has since been licensed to other manufacturers.
- Xenon High-intensity discharge headlights (low beam only) were introduced in 1995.
- Door mounted Side Airbags and seat occupancy sensors were introduced in 1996 for the 1997 Model Year.
- Automatic windscreen wipers with rain sensors were introduced in 1996.

=== Comfort and convenience ===
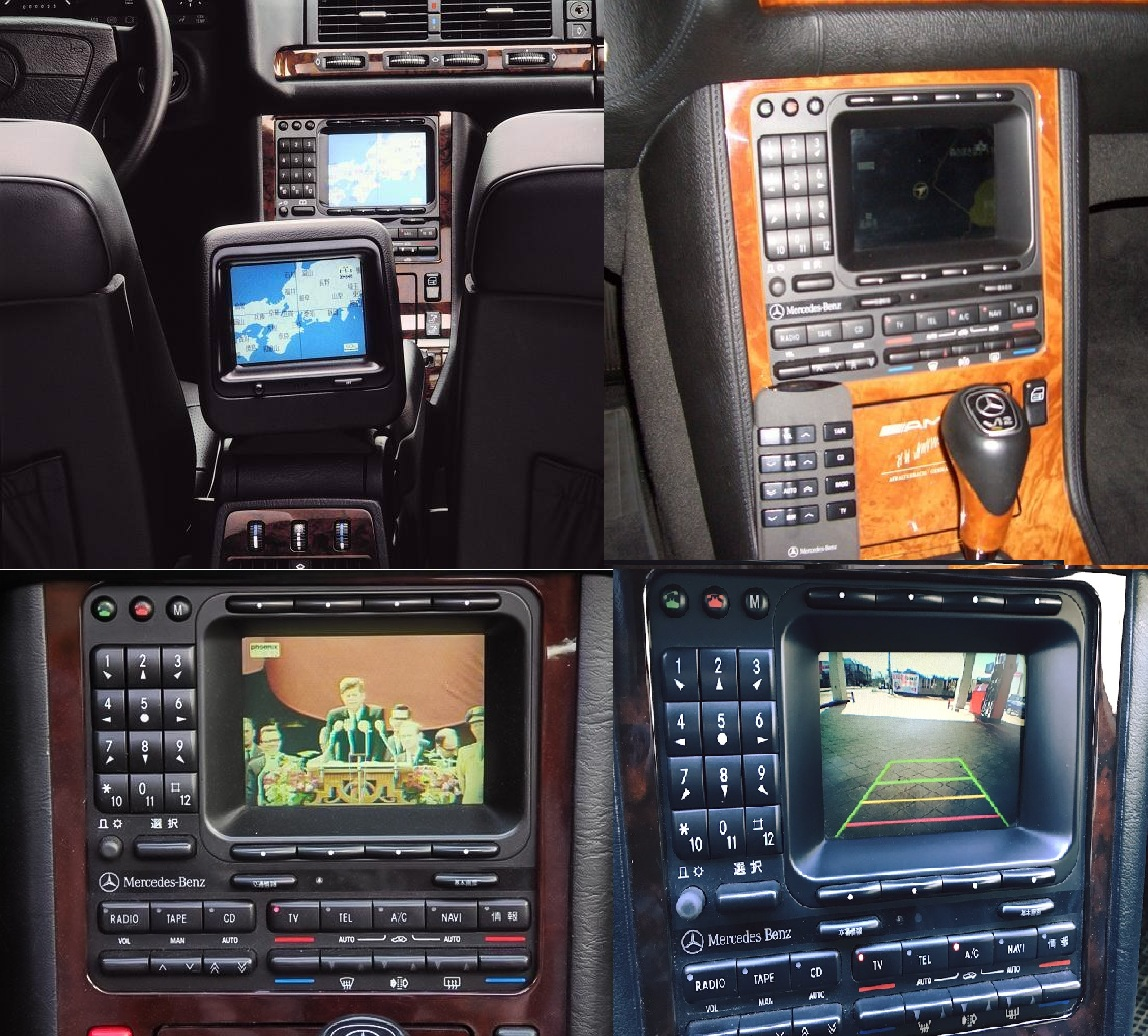
Originally developed for the Japanese market: Navigation system with screen, TV reception and car telephone

W140 features included:

- Double paned soundproofed glass was a new S-Class innovation first fitted on the W140. This form of window glazing allowed for improved soundproofing, reduced condensation, and other insulation benefits.
- Electrically operated exterior mirrors could be folded by switch to ease driving in narrow spaces.
- 'Parameter steering' was a system which made low-speed driving easier by reducing the effort required to maneuver in speed-sensitive situations such as parking.
- Rear-parking markers, or guide rods. These rods extended from the rear corners of the trunk lid when in reverse, providing the driver with a guideline for rear maneuvers. In 1995, this system was replaced by the sonar-based Parktronic system which measured the distance of the bumpers to nearby obstacles.
- 12-way powered, heated front seats, with 3 setting memory functions and lumbar support.
- Windshield wipers with heated washer system. Later models also included rain-sensing windshield wipers.
- Electrically operated automatic-dimming inside rear-view mirror that tied into the seat and steering wheel memory.
- Heated exterior mirrors. Later models also included auto-dimming driver's side mirror.
- Orthopedic seats were an expensive option from the factory that consisted of several different air cushions in the seat that the user can inflate and deflate to find the perfect driving position.
- Dual-zone climate control. Four-zone climate control on LWB models.
- Reclining and heated rear seats on LWB models. V12 models also have the four-place seating option, which allows fully adjustable rear seats, lumbar support and rear sunshade control. The center seat has been replaced by a burlwood center console, allowing a 2 + 2 seating format.
- The climate control system could be set to operate for 20 minutes after the engine had been turned off.
- Electric rear sunshade.
- Rear passenger illuminated vanity mirrors.
- Soft-closing doors and trunk.
- Leather interiors and burl inserts (optional; standard for 500SEC/CL 500).
- In 1995, the S 600 Coupé became the first Mercedes car with a GPS navigation system, designated "Auto Pilot System" or APS. It featured CD-ROM-installed maps and full color navigation display in the center dashboard.
- In 1996, the Linguatronic voice control system and Parktronic sonar-based parking system were introduced.
- In 1997, the TELEAID emergency and tracking system was introduced in the US market.
- Also, developed with the car, a Bose sound system was available as an option.

=== Drivetrain technologies ===
- First introduction of CAN bus (5 CAN bus nodes).
- The W140 featured a newly developed front axle double wishbone suspension and a rear independent multi-link suspension.
- In 1991, the first generation of the hydropneumatic ADS (Adaptive Damping System) (Skyhook-type suspension) was introduced. It adjusted the damping level of the shock absorbers to help stabilize the car during high speed driving, aggressive driving, or if the driver loses control of the vehicle. Became standard on V12 models and optional for V8 models.
- In 1996, self-levelling suspension was integrated with ADS.
- A new diesel inline six engine with four valves per cylinder, a first for Mercedes-Benz, was introduced in 1996 as S 300 TURBODIESEL.

=== Gallery ===
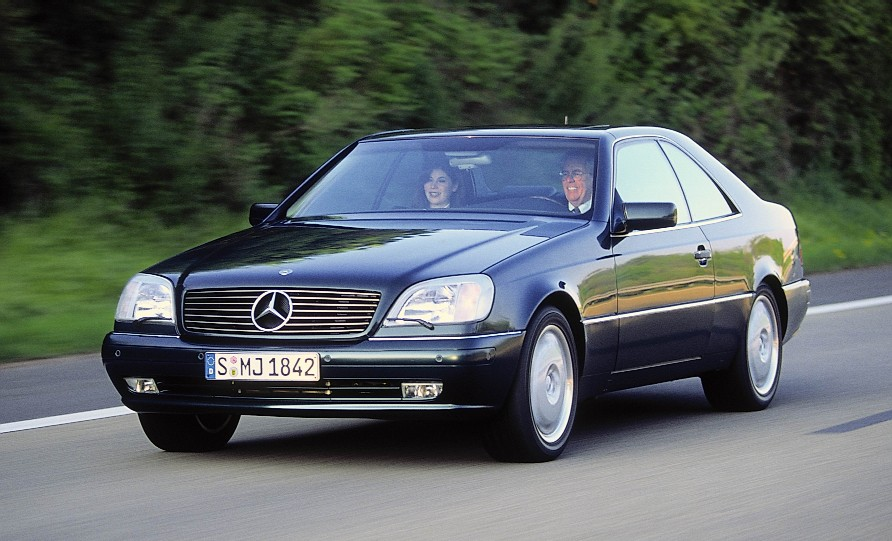
1996–1998 CL 500 (C140)

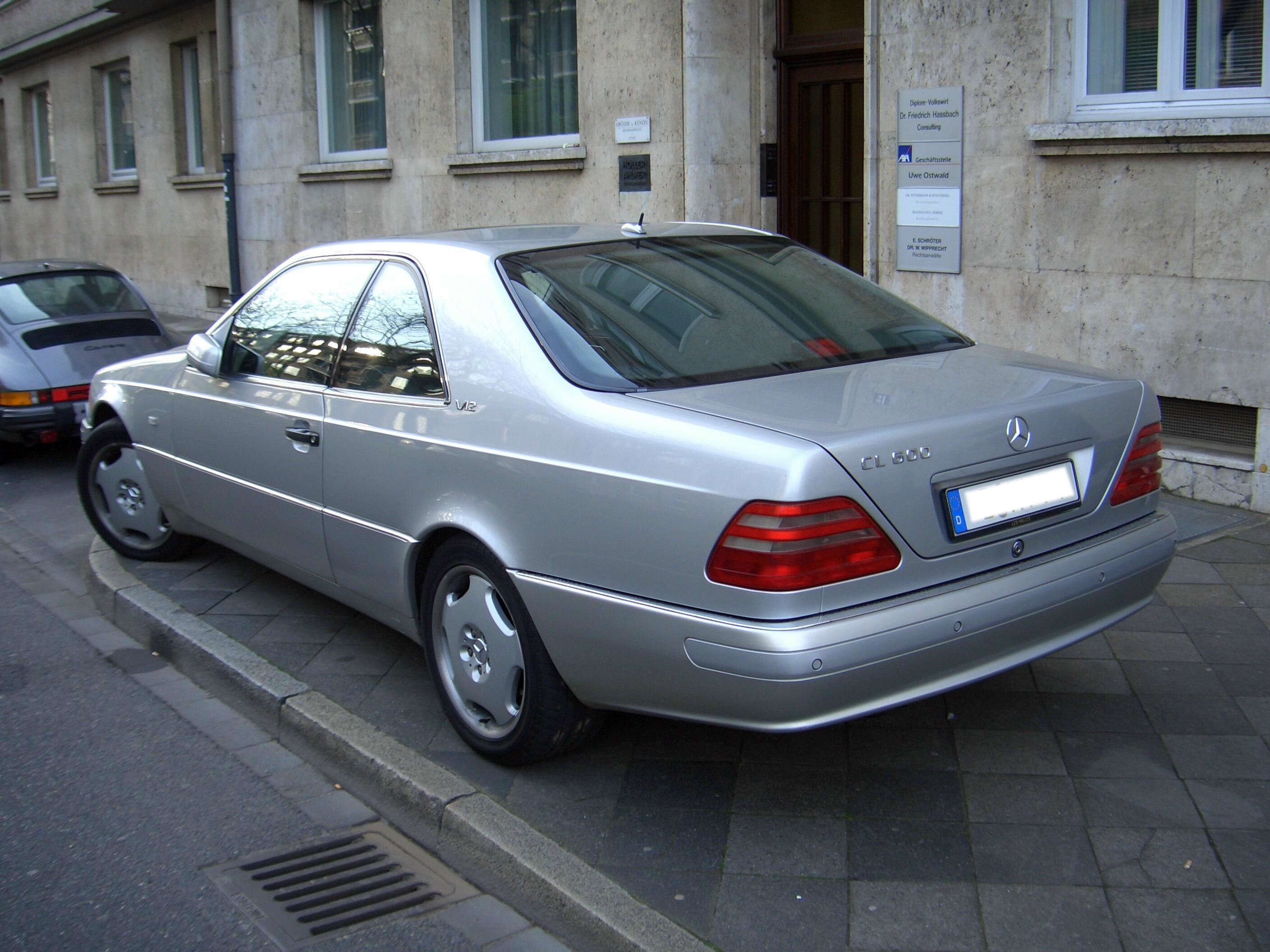
1996–1998 CL 600 (C140)

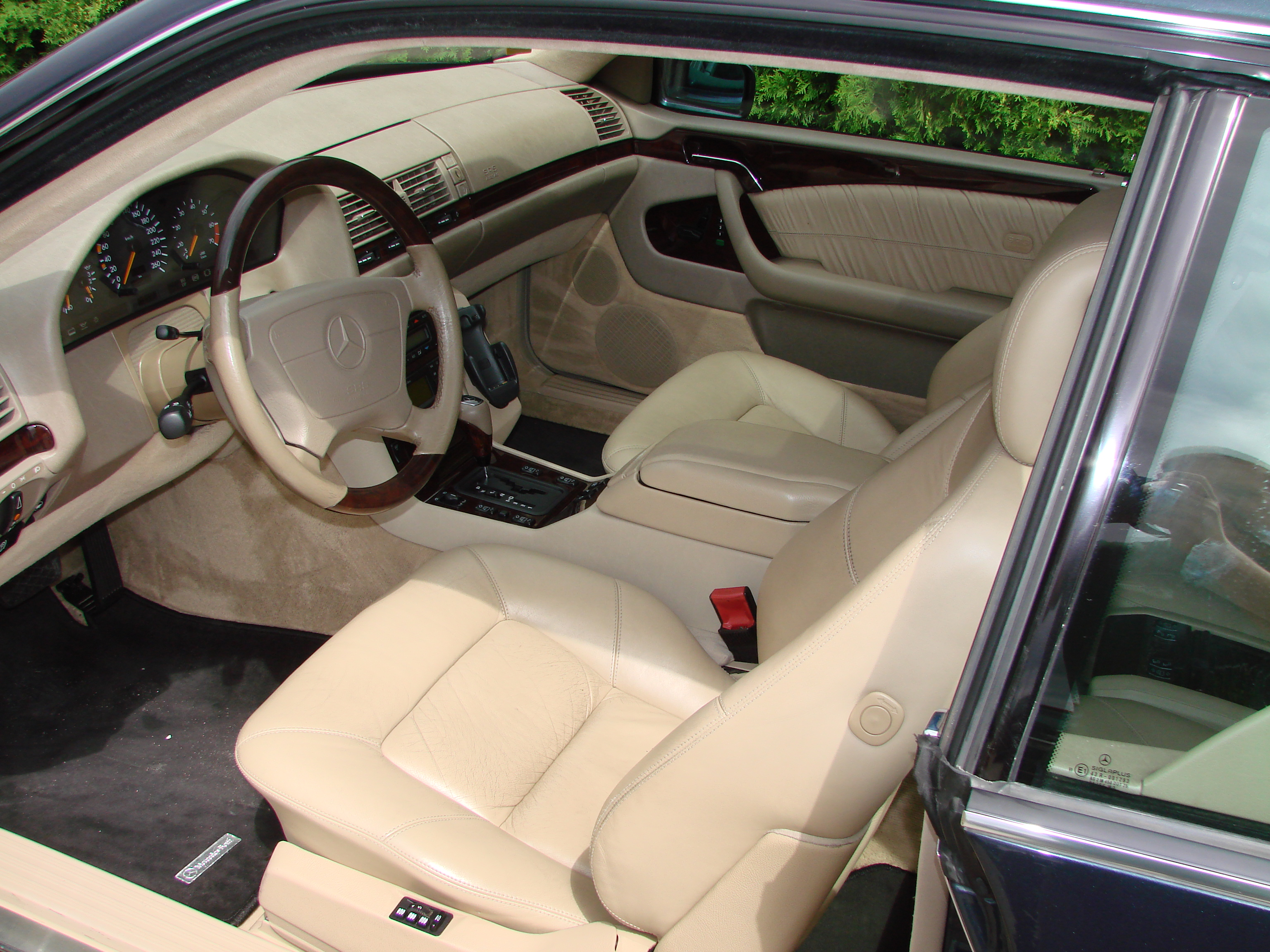
Interior (C140): the 500 luxury version was sold with Nappa leather and burl inserts

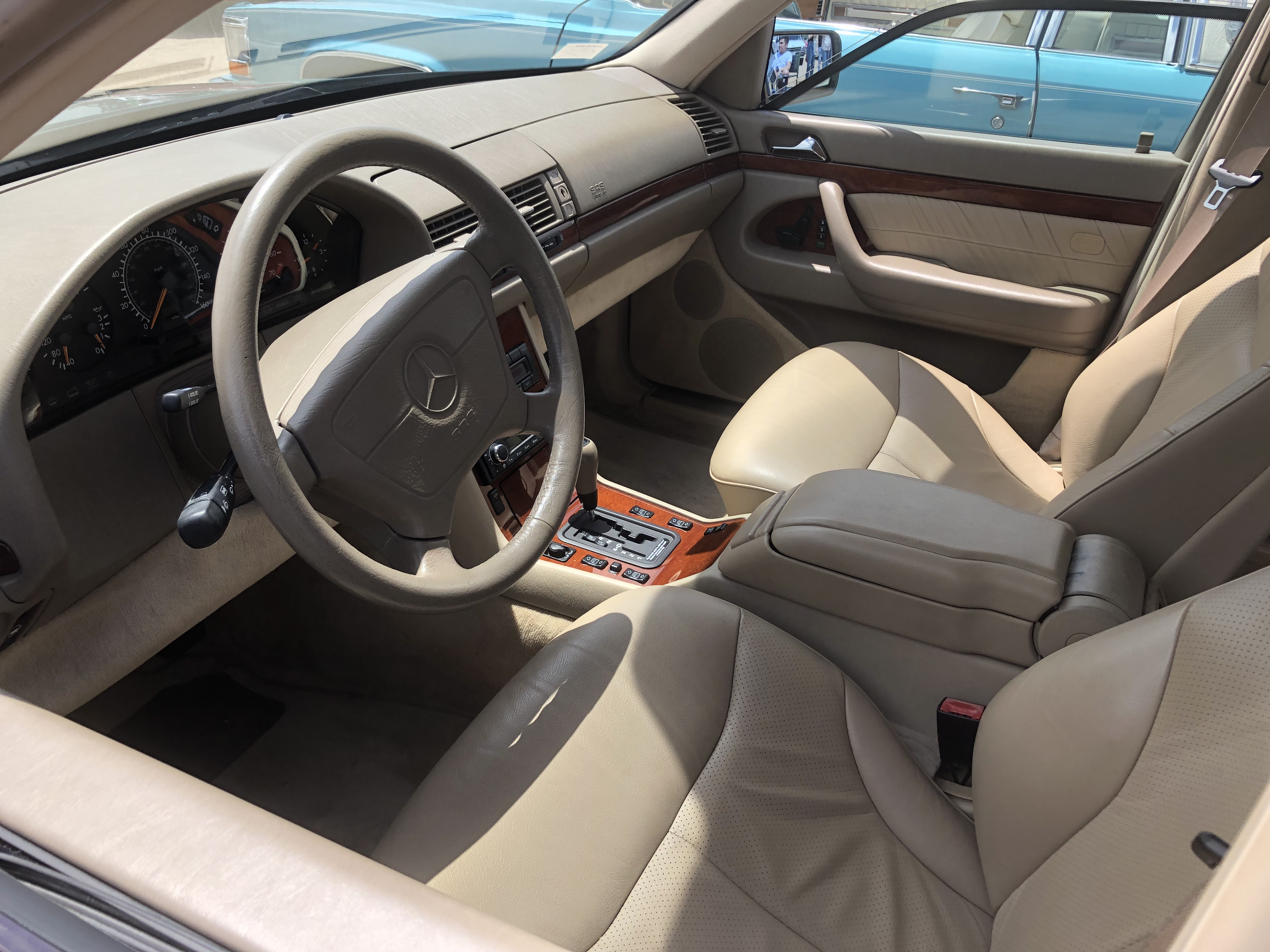
S 320 interior (W140)

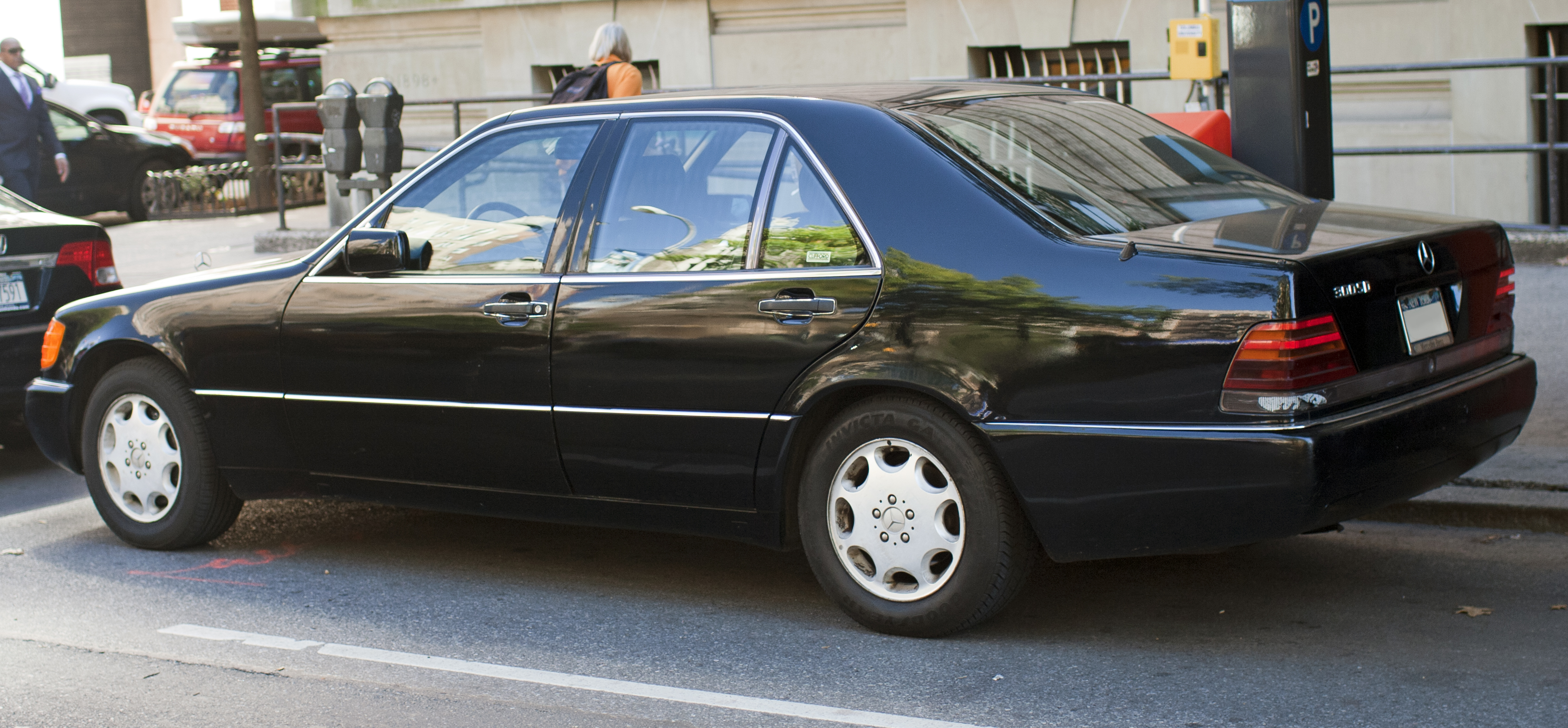
1991–1993 300 SD (W140)

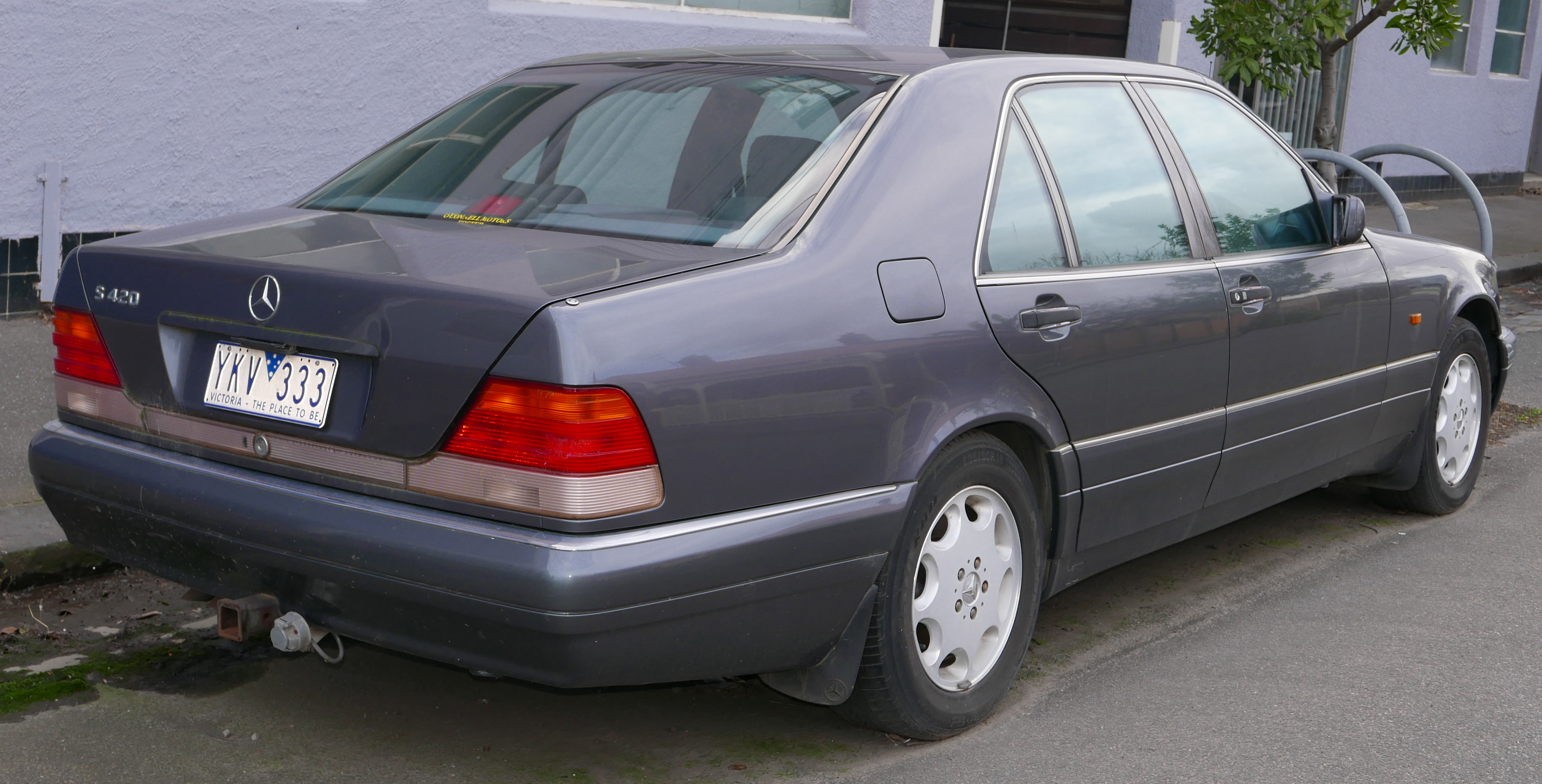
1994–1996 S 420 (W140)

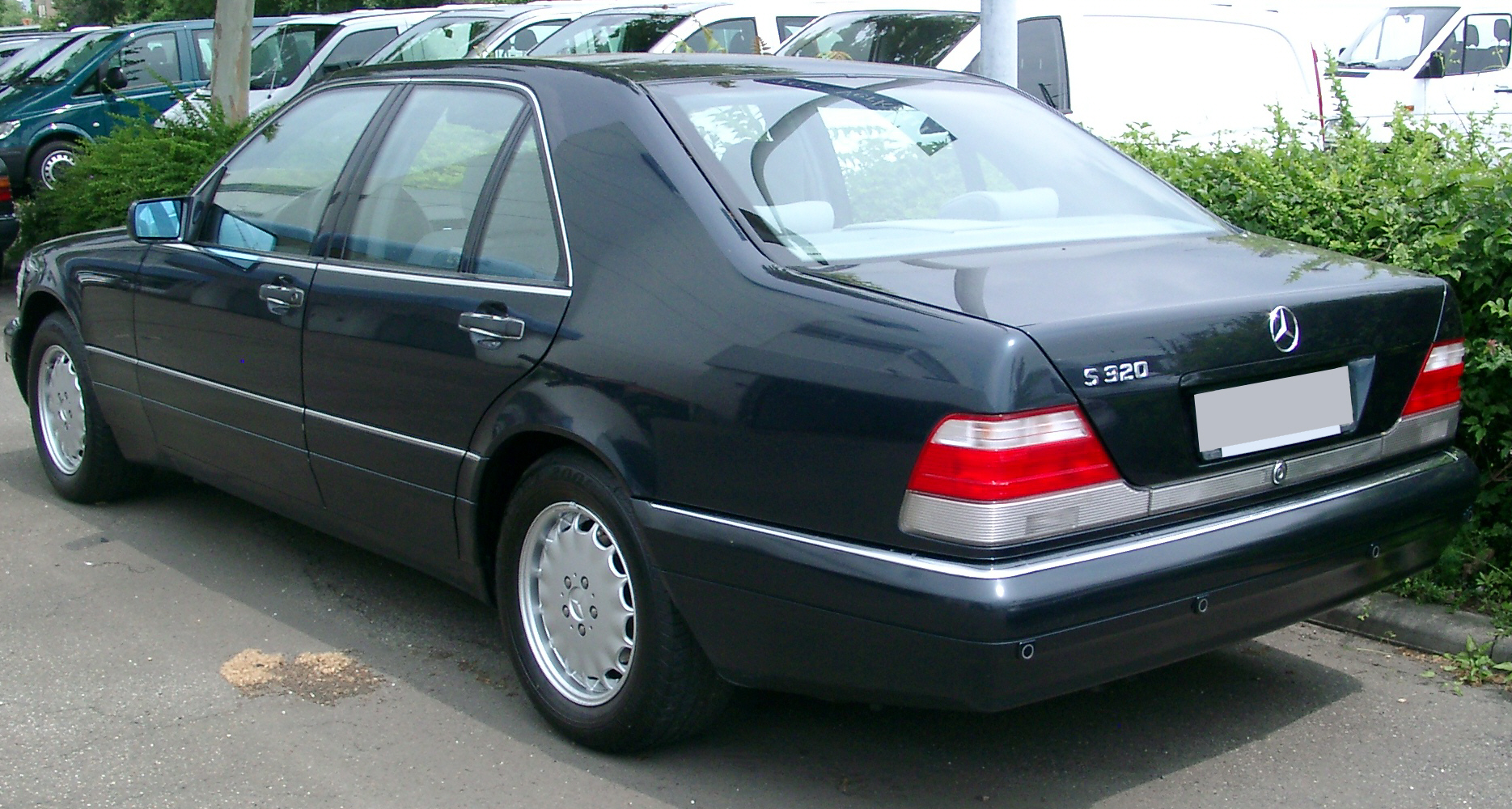
1996–1998 S 320 (W140)

== Engines ==
For the W140 series, a new generation of inline-6 and V8 petrol engines was developed with double overhead camshafts (DOHC), four valves per cylinder, and new variable valve timing. Mercedes-Benz's first passenger V12 engine was introduced in 1991 in a response to BMW's 750i/750iL (E32). Only the 3.5-litre inline-6 diesel engine, OM 603.97x, was carried over from W126, and it remained the only engine in the W140 model range with a two-valves-per-cylinder format until its replacement in 1996. The advent of DOHC, with four valves per cylinder and accompanied by variable valve timing, helped to increase the horsepower and torque figures without imposing a heavy fuel-consumption penalty, all while reducing emissions. All petrol engines were equipped with catalytic converters during the entire W140 model run, regardless of where they were sold.

The M 104 petrol engine was introduced in 1992 with two displacements: the smaller 2.8-litre M 104.94x engine was fitted to the 300 SE 2.8 (one year only) then the S 280 (1994-1998); the larger 3.2-litre M 104.99x engine was fitted to the 300 SE/300 SEL (one year only) then the S 320 (1994–1998).

The M 119 V8 engines were available in 4.2-litre (M 119 E 42) and 5.0-litre (M 119 E 50) versions and remained unchanged during its entire model run. In 1994, AMG developed a 6.0-litre version (M 119 E 60) with 279 kW (379 PS; 374 bhp) and 580 N⋅m (428 lb⋅ft) in a very limited production for Japanese market. The S 500 AMG 6.0 and CL 500 AMG 6.0 were built from 1994 to 1999 per customer order. For 1993, the V8 engines were detuned for improved emission control.

The M 120 V12 engine was offered in 6.0 litres only for the entire model run. This engine developed 290–300 kW (394–408 PS; 389–402 hp) and 569–580 N⋅m (420–428 lb⋅ft) of torque. The 300 kW (408 PS; 402 bhp) version was available in Europe from 1991 to 1992 and in the United States for 1992 only. In 1993, the V12 was slightly detuned to 290 kW (394 PS; 389 bhp) for lower emission control. An AMG-prepared 6.0-litre M 120 V12 with higher performance rating, 327 kW (445 PS; 439 hp) and 623 N⋅m (460 lb⋅ft), was only available for S- or CL-Class (C140) coupes and not S-Class sedans/saloons.

The 3.5-litre inline-6 diesel engine, OM 603.97x in the 300 SD TURBODIESEL (1991–1993) and S 350 TURBODIESEL (1994–1996) models was offered outside the North American and Japanese markets for the first time. This engine was replaced in 1996 by the entirely new 24-valve OM 606.961 ERE engine. This engine was loosely derived from the M 104 petrol engine, but with a different crankshaft and cylinder head. The smaller engine fitted to the S 300 TURBODIESEL produced 130 kW (177 PS; 174 hp) and 330 N⋅m (243 lb⋅ft). The fuel was delivered indirectly in the precombustion chamber before entering the combustion chamber.

== Transmissions ==
The transmission choices at its introduction were a 5-speed manual and 4-speed 4G-Tronic automatic.

In 1994, a 5-speed version of the 4G-Tronic was introduced for the inline 6 petrol engines. This was essentially a 4G-Tronic 4-speed with an electronically controlled, fifth gear overdrive bolted onto the rear of the transmission housing. Due to the low torque rating, all other models continued to use the older 4-speed 4G-Tronic transmissions.

In September 1996, Mercedes introduced the 5G-Tronic transmission. The 5G-Tronic integrated the overdrive gear into the main transmission housing and was fully electronically controlled, allowing for more optimal shifting points based on sensor readings. This transmission had a higher torque rating and became the sole automatic transmission option for the entire model range from 1996 to 1998.

The models equipped with inline 6 petrol engines have the 5-speed manual transmission as standard with either the 4-speed or 5-speed automatic transmission as extra-cost options, making the W140 the last S-Class to be offered with a manual transmission. The inline 6 diesel engines were never offered with manual transmissions, following the "tradition" with the W116 and W126. The S 300 TURBODIESEL, introduced in 1996, received the 5G-Tronic.

4MATIC, the all-wheel-drive system introduced in the W124 (1985–1996), was never fitted to the W140 S-Class. The W140's successor, the W220, became the first S-Class to have 4MATIC as an extra-cost option.

== Technical data ==
The figures given for acceleration, top speed, and fuel consumption are combination of all types of transmission (5-speed manual, 4-speed automatic, 5-speed automatic, and 5-speed electronically controlled automatic) and three body types (standard, long, and coupé) wherever applicable.

Model	Chassis	Years	Configuration	Displacement	Power	Torque	Empty weight	0–100 km/h (0–62 mph)	Top speed (km/h)	Fuel consumption	Units
Petrol engines
300 SE 2.8	W140.028	02/1992–05/1993	(M 104 E 28) Inline 6	2799 cc	142 kW (193 PS; 190 bhp)	270 N⋅m (199 lb⋅ft)	1,890 kg (4,167 lb)	10.6–11 seconds	210–215 km/h (130–134 mph)	11.1–11.7 L/100 km (21.2–20.1 mpg_{‑US})	22,784
S 280	W140.028	06/1993–09/1998	(M 104 E 28) Inline 6	2799 cc	142 kW (193 PS; 190 bhp)	270 N⋅m (199 lb⋅ft)	1,890 kg (4,167 lb)	10.6–11 seconds	210–215 km/h (130–134 mph)	11.1–11.7 L/100 km (21.2–20.1 mpg_{‑US})	22,784
300 SE	W140.032	09/1991–05/1993	(M 104 E 32) Inline 6	3199 cc	170 kW (231 PS; 228 bhp)	310 N⋅m (229 lb⋅ft)	1,890 kg (4,167 lb)	8.9–9.4 seconds	225–230 km/h (140–143 mph)	11.1–12.3 L/100 km (21.2–19.1 mpg_{‑US})	98,095
S 320	W140.032	06/1993–09/1998	(M 104 E 32) Inline 6	3199 cc	170 kW (231 PS; 228 bhp)	315 N⋅m (232 lb⋅ft)	1,890 kg (4,167 lb)	8.9–9.4 seconds	225–230 km/h (140–143 mph)	11.1–12.3 L/100 km (21.2–19.1 mpg_{‑US})	98,095
300 SEL	W140.033	01/1991–05/1993	(M 104 E 32) Inline 6	3199 cc	170 kW (231 PS; 228 bhp)	310 N⋅m (229 lb⋅ft)	1,900 kg (4,189 lb)	8.9–9.4 seconds	225–230 km/h (140–143 mph)	11.1–12.3 L/100 km (21.2–19.1 mpg_{‑US})	85,346
S 320 Long	W140.033	06/1993–09/1998	(M 104 E 32) Inline 6	3199 cc	170 kW (231 PS; 228 bhp)	315 N⋅m (232 lb⋅ft)	1,900 kg (4,189 lb)	8.9–9.4 seconds	225–230 km/h (140–143 mph)	11.1–12.3 L/100 km (21.2–19.1 mpg_{‑US})	85,346
400 SE	W140.042	04/1991–05/1993	(M 119 E 42) V8	4196 cc	210 kW (286 PS; 282 bhp)	410 N⋅m (302 lb⋅ft)	1,900 kg (4,189 lb)	7.9–8.5 seconds	245–250 km/h (152–155 mph)	11.7–12.2 L/100 km (20.1–19.3 mpg_{‑US})	14,277
S 420	W140.042	06/1993–08/1998	(M 119 E 42) V8	4196 cc	205 kW (279 PS; 275 bhp)	400 N⋅m (295 lb⋅ft)	1,900 kg (4,189 lb)	7.9–8.5 seconds	245–250 km/h (152–155 mph)	11.7–12.2 L/100 km (20.1–19.3 mpg_{‑US})	14,277
400 SEL	W140.043	04/1991–05/1993	(M 119 E 42) V8	4196 cc	210 kW (286 PS; 282 bhp)	410 N⋅m (302 lb⋅ft)	2,000 kg (4,409 lb)	7.9–8.5 seconds	245–250 km/h (152–155 mph)	11.7–12.2 L/100 km (20.1–19.3 mpg_{‑US})	35,191
S 420 Long	W140.043	06/1993–09/1998	(M 119 E 42) V8	4196 cc	205 kW (279 PS; 275 bhp)	400 N⋅m (295 lb⋅ft)	2,000 kg (4,409 lb)	7.9–8.5 seconds	245–250 km/h (152–155 mph)	11.7–12.2 L/100 km (20.1–19.3 mpg_{‑US})	35,191
S 420 Coupé; CL 420	W140.063	02/1994–08/1998	(M 119 E 42) V8	4196 cc	205 kW (279 PS; 275 bhp)	400 N⋅m (295 lb⋅ft)	2,080 kg (4,586 lb)	7.9–8.5 seconds	245–250 km/h (152–155 mph)	11.7–12.2 L/100 km (20.1–19.3 mpg_{‑US})	2,496
500 SE	W140.050	04/1991–05/1993	(M 119 E 50) V8	4973 cc	240 kW (326 PS; 322 bhp)	480 N⋅m (354 lb⋅ft)	1,900 kg (4,189 lb)	7.0–7.5 seconds	250 km/h (155 mph)	11.5–11.9 L/100 km (20.5–19.8 mpg_{‑US})	21,942
S 500	W140.050	06/1993–08/1998	(M 119 E 50) V8	4973 cc	235 kW (320 PS; 315 bhp)	470 N⋅m (347 lb⋅ft)	1,900 kg (4,189 lb)	7.0–7.5 seconds	250 km/h (155 mph)	11.5–11.9 L/100 km (20.5–19.8 mpg_{‑US})	21,942
500 SEL	W140.051	04/1991–05/1993	(M 119 E 50) V8	4973 cc	240 kW (326 PS; 322 bhp)	480 N⋅m (354 lb⋅ft)	2,000 kg (4,409 lb)	7.0–7.5 seconds	250 km/h (155 mph)	11.5–11.9 L/100 km (20.5–19.8 mpg_{‑US})	65,065
S 500 Long	W140.051	06/1993–09/1998	(M 119 E 50) V8	4973 cc	235 kW (320 PS; 315 bhp)	470 N⋅m (347 lb⋅ft)	2,000 kg (4,409 lb)	7.0–7.5 seconds	250 km/h (155 mph)	11.5–11.9 L/100 km (20.5–19.8 mpg_{‑US})	65,065
500 SEC	W140.070	10/1992–05/1993	(M 119 E 50) V8	4973 cc	240 kW (326 PS; 322 bhp)	480 N⋅m (354 lb⋅ft)	2,080 kg (4,586 lb)	7.0–7.5 seconds	250 km/h (155 mph)	11.5–11.9 L/100 km (20.5–19.8 mpg_{‑US})	14,953
S 500 Coupé; CL 500	W140.070	06/1993–09/1998	(M 119 E 50) V8	4973 cc	235 kW (320 PS; 315 bhp)	470 N⋅m (347 lb⋅ft)	2,080 kg (4,586 lb)	7.0–7.5 seconds	250 km/h (155 mph)	11.5–11.9 L/100 km (20.5–19.8 mpg_{‑US})	14,953
600 SE	W140.056	04/1991–05/1993	(M 120 E 60) V12	5987 cc	300 kW (408 PS; 402 bhp)	580 N⋅m (428 lb⋅ft)	2,180 kg (4,806 lb)	6.3–6.5 seconds	250 km/h (155 mph)	12.5–13.7 L/100 km (18.8–17.2 mpg_{‑US})	3,399
S 600	W140.056	06/1993–07/1998	(M 120 E 60) V12	5987 cc	290 kW (394 PS; 389 bhp)	570 N⋅m (420 lb⋅ft)	2,180 kg (4,806 lb)	6.3–6.5 seconds	250 km/h (155 mph)	12.5–13.7 L/100 km (18.8–17.2 mpg_{‑US})	3,399
600 SEL	W140.057	04/1991–05/1993	(M 120 E 60) V12	5987 cc	300 kW (408 PS; 402 bhp)	580 N⋅m (428 lb⋅ft)	2,190 kg (4,828 lb)	6.3–6.5 seconds	250 km/h (155 mph)	12.5–13.7 L/100 km (18.8–17.2 mpg_{‑US})	32,517
S 600 Long	W140.057	06/1993–09/1998	(M 120 E 60) V12	5987 cc	290 kW (394 PS; 389 bhp)	570 N⋅m (420 lb⋅ft)	2,190 kg (4,828 lb)	6.3–6.5 seconds	250 km/h (155 mph)	12.5–13.7 L/100 km (18.8–17.2 mpg_{‑US})	32,517
600 SEC	W140.076	10/1992–05/1993	(M 120 E 60) V12	5987 cc	300 kW (408 PS; 402 bhp)	580 N⋅m (428 lb⋅ft)	2,240 kg (4,938 lb)	6.3–6.5 seconds	250 km/h (155 mph)	12.5–13.7 L/100 km (18.8–17.2 mpg_{‑US})	8,573
S 600 Coupé; CL 600	W140.076	06/1993–09/1998	(M 120 E 60) V12	5987 cc	290 kW (394 PS; 389 bhp)	570 N⋅m (420 lb⋅ft)	2,240 kg (4,938 lb)	6.3–6.5 seconds	250 km/h (155 mph)	12.5–13.7 L/100 km (18.8–17.2 mpg_{‑US})	8,573
Diesel engines
300 SD	W140.134	10/1991–05/1993	(OM 603 D 35 A, 12 valves) Inline 6	3449 cc	110 kW (150 PS; 148 bhp)	310 N⋅m (229 lb⋅ft)	1,940 kg (4,277 lb)	13.1 seconds	185 km/h (115 mph)	9.7 L/100 km (24 mpg_{‑US})	20,518
S 350 Turbodiesel	W140.134	06/1993–08/1996	(OM 603 D 35 A, 12 valves) Inline 6	3449 cc	110 kW (150 PS; 148 bhp)	310 N⋅m (229 lb⋅ft)	1,940 kg (4,277 lb)	13.1 seconds	185 km/h (115 mph)	9.7 L/100 km (24 mpg_{‑US})	20,518
S 300 Turbodiesel	W140.135	06/1996–08/1998	(OM 606 D 30 LA, 24 valves) Inline 6	2996 cc	130 kW (177 PS; 174 bhp)	330 N⋅m (243 lb⋅ft)	1,940 kg (4,277 lb)	11.2 seconds	206 km/h (128 mph)	8.1 L/100 km (29 mpg_{‑US})	7,583
