= Altfrid Heger =

German racing driver (born 1958)

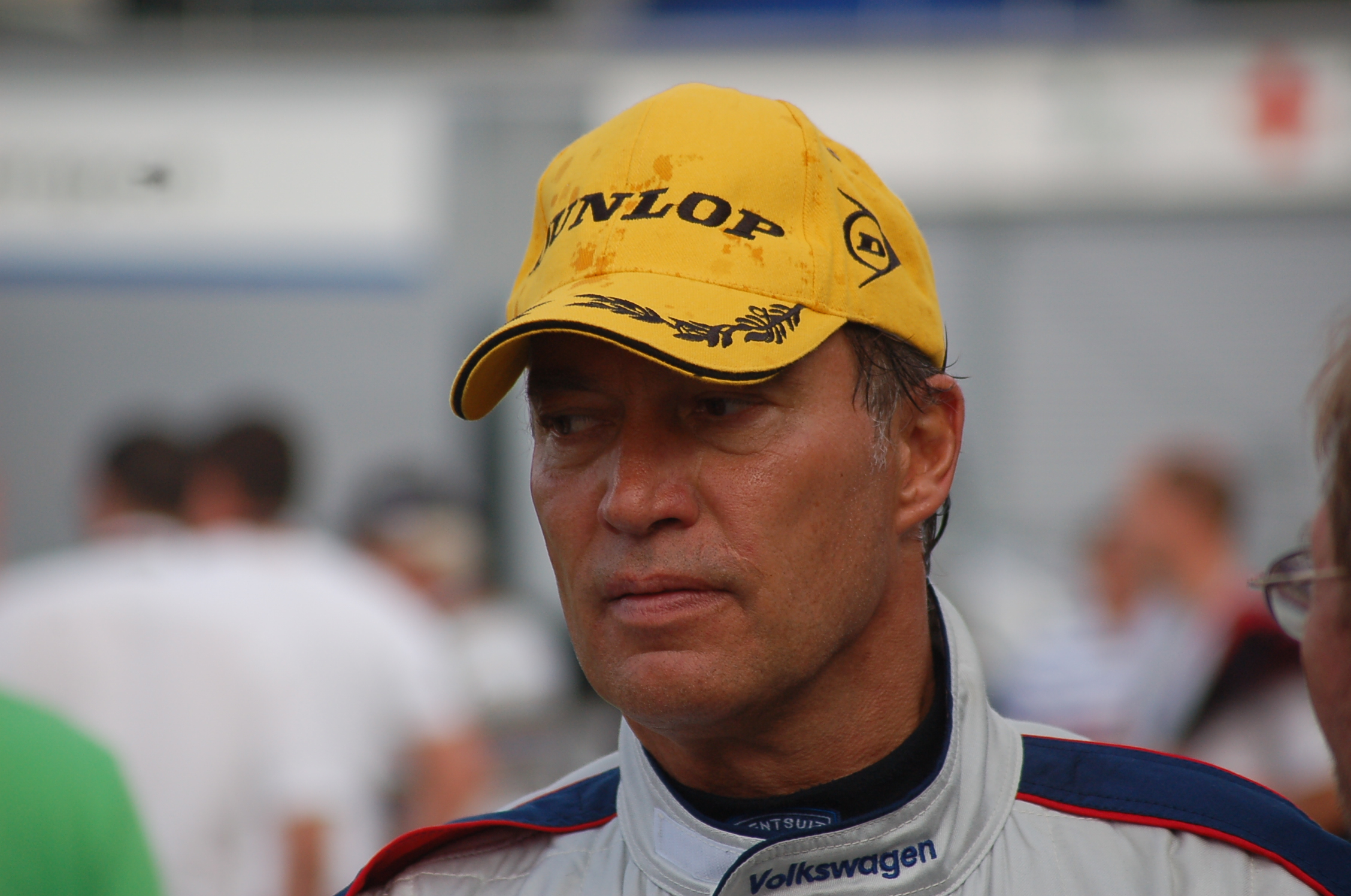
- Heger in 2010.
- Nationality: (Germany) German
- Born: 24 January 1958 (age 68) Essen, Germany

Championship titles
- 1993: Porsche Supercup

Altfrid Heger (born 24 January 1958) is a German former racing driver and motorsport entrepreneur. Active internationally since the 1980s, he competed in the World Touring Car Championship, the Deutsche Tourenwagen Meisterschaft (DTM), and major endurance events. He won the Guia Race in 1988 and the Porsche Supercup championship in 1993.

Over the course of his career, Heger claimed victories at the 24 Hours of Spa in 1986 and 1988, as well as the 24 Hours of Nürburgring in 1990 and 2000. He was a regular top-ten finisher in the DTM between 1988 and 1990. Beyond driving, he co-founded Hegersport GmbH, a motorsport agency that organized the V8Star Series, managed the Porsche Sports Cup Germany, and entered the FIA GT1 World Championship.

== Racing record ==
=== Complete 24 Hours of Le Mans results ===
Year	Team	Co-Drivers	Car	Class	Laps	Pos.	Class Pos.
1984	(Switzerland) Claude Haldi	(Switzerland) Claude Haldi (Switzerland) Jean Krucker	Porsche 930	B	285	16th	**2nd**
1985	(Switzerland) Vogelsang	(Germany) Harald Grohs (Germany) Kurt König	BMW M1	B	32	DNF	DNF

=== Complete International Formula 3000 results ===
(key) (Races in bold indicate pole position; races in italics indicate fastest lap.)

Year	Entrant	Chassis	Engine	1	2	3	4	5	6	7	8	9	10	11	Pos.	Pts
1986	Bertram Schäfer Racing	March 85B	Cosworth	SIL; 23	VAL; DNQ	PAU; DNQ		IMO; Ret							NC	0
1986	Bertram Schäfer Racing	March 86B	Cosworth				SPA; DNS								NC	0
1986	Bertram Schäfer Racing	Ralt RT20	Cosworth						MUG; 13	PER; DNQ	ÖST; DNQ	BIR; Ret	BUG; Ret	JAR; 13	NC	0
1987	Bertram Schäfer Racing	Ralt RT21	Cosworth	SIL	VAL	SPA; DNQ	PAU	DON	PER						NC	0
1987	GA Motorsport	Lola T86/50	Cosworth							BRH; 21	BIR; DNQ	IMO	BUG	JAR	NC	0

=== Complete Deutsche Tourenwagen Meisterschaft results ===
(key) (Races in bold indicate pole position) (Races in italics indicate fastest lap)

Year	Team	Car	1	2	3	4	5	6	7	8	9	10	11	12	13	14	15	16	17	18	19	20	21	22	23	24	Pos.	Pts
1988	BMW M Team Linder	BMW M3	ZOL; 1; 6	ZOL; 2 Ret	HOC; 1; 20	HOC; 2; 11	**NÜR**; **1** Ret	NÜR; 2 Ret	BRN; 1; 5	BRN; 2; 3	AVU; 1 Ret	AVU; 2; 10	MFA; 1; 1	**MFA**; **2**; 1	NÜR; 1; 4	NÜR; 2 Ret	NOR; 1; 6	NOR; 2; 15	WUN; 1; 13	WUN; 2; 8	SAL; 1 C	SAL; 2 C	HUN; 1; 8	HUN; 2; 6	HOC; 1	HOC; 2	8th	173
1989	BMW M Team Linder	BMW M3 Evo	ZOL; 1; 4	ZOL; 2; 9	HOC; 1; 4	HOC; 2; 5	NÜR; 1; 25	NÜR; 2; 6	**MFA**; **1**; 6	MFA; 2 Ret	AVU; 1; 12	AVU; 2; 11	NÜR; 1; 8	NÜR; 2 Ret	NOR; 1; 5	NOR; 2; 7	HOC; 1 Ret	HOC; 2 DNS	DIE; 1; 17	DIE; 2; 10	NÜR; 1; 3	NÜR; 2; 3	HOC; 1	HOC; 2			8th	175
1990	BMW M Team Linder	BMW M3 Sport Evo	ZOL; 1; 21	ZOL; 2 Ret	HOC; 1; 9	HOC; 2; 5	**NÜR**; **1** Ret	NÜR; 2 Ret	AVU; 1; 2	AVU; 2; 2	MFA; 1; 14	MFA; 2; 4	WUN; 1 Ret	WUN; 2 Ret	NÜR; 1; 7	NÜR; 2 Ret	NOR; 1; 6	NOR; 2; 2	DIE; 1; 5	DIE; 2; 2	NÜR; 1; 19	NÜR; 2; 15	HOC; 1; 23	HOC; 2 Ret			8th	98
1991	Linder M Team	BMW M3 Sport Evo	ZOL; 1; 16	ZOL; 2; 11	HOC; 1; 16	HOC; 2; 24	NÜR; 1; 9	NÜR; 2 Ret	AVU; 1; 14	AVU; 2 Ret	WUN; 1; 8	WUN; 2; 8	NOR; 1 Ret	NOR; 2; 10	DIE; 1; 28	DIE; 2 Ret	NÜR; 1; 6	NÜR; 2; 8	ALE; 1; 12	ALE; 2 Ret	HOC; 1; 11	HOC; 2; 17	BRN; 1; 7	BRN; 2 Ret	DON; 1; 12	DON; 2; 11	18th	18
1992	Schnitzer Motorsport	BMW M3 Sport Evo	ZOL; 1 Ret	ZOL; 2; 7	NÜR; 1; 8	NÜR; 2; 13	WUN; 1; 13	WUN; 2; 8	AVU; 1; 14	AVU; 2 Ret	HOC; 1; 8	HOC; 2 Ret	NÜR; 1; 9	NÜR; 2; 22	NOR; 1; 10	NOR; 2 Ret	BRN; 1; 8	BRN; 2; 9	DIE; 1; 9	DIE; 2; 6	ALE; 1; 11	ALE; 2; 9	NÜR; 1; 8	NÜR; 2; 10	HOC; 1; 8	HOC; 2 Ret	14th	38

=== Complete Super Tourenwagen Cup results ===
(key) (Races in bold indicate pole position) (Races in italics indicate fastest lap)

Year	Team	Car	1	2	3	4	5	6	7	8	9	10	11	12	13	14	15	16	17	18	19	20	Pos.	Pts
1994	BMW Team Schneider	BMW 318i	AVU; 9	WUN; 8	ZOL; 4	ZAN; 6	**ÖST**; 1	SAL; 2	SPA; 2	NÜR; 6													4th	77
1995	A.Z.K.-Team Schneider	Audi A4 Quattro	**ZOL**; **1**; 3	ZOL; 2; 2	SPA; 1; 5	SPA; 2; 6	ÖST; 1; 7	ÖST; 2; 15	HOC; 1; 2	HOC; 2; 4	NÜR; 1; 11	NÜR; 2; 7	SAL; 1; 7	SAL; 2; 17	AVU; 1; 8	AVU; 2; 4	NÜR; 1; 17	NÜR; 2; 7					5th	315
1996	Peugeot Esso	Peugeot 406	ZOL; 1; 10	ZOL; 2 Ret	ASS; 1; 13	ASS; 2 Ret	HOC; 1; 10	HOC; 2; 6	SAC; 1; 14	SAC; 2; 11	WUN; 1; 4	WUN; 2; 17	ZWE; 1; 12	ZWE; 2; 7	SAL; 1; 4	SAL; 2 Ret	AVU; 1 Ret	AVU; 2; 10	NÜR; 1; 12	NÜR; 2; 8			11th	223
1997	Team Honda Sport	Honda Accord	HOC; 1; 28	HOC; 2 Ret	ZOL; 1; 28	ZOL; 2; 12	NÜR; 1; 5	NÜR; 2; 4	SAC; 1; 16	SAC; 2; 14	NOR; 1; 10	NOR; 2 Ret	WUN; 1; 10	WUN; 2; 13	ZWE; 1; 11	ZWE; 2; 15	SAL; 1; 12	SAL; 2 Ret	REG; 1; 12	REG; 2; 7	NÜR; 1; 10	NÜR; 2; 8	12th	238

=== Complete FIA GT Championship results ===
(key) (Races in bold indicate pole position) (Races in italics indicate fastest lap)

Year	Team	Car	Class	1	2	3	4	5	6	7	8	9	10	Pos.	Pts
1998	Konrad Motorsport	Porsche 911 GT2	GT2	OSC	SIL	HOC	DIJ	HUN; DNS	SUZ; 4	DON; 2	A1R; 3	HOM	LAG	15th	13
1999	Konrad Motorsport	Porsche 911 GT2	GT2	MNZ	SIL	HOC	HUN	ZOL; 6	OSC	DON	HOM	GLN	ZHU	40th	1

==== Complete GT1 World Championship results ====
(key) (Races in bold indicate pole position; races in italics indicate fastest lap.)

Year	Team	Car	1	2	3	4	5	6	7	8	9	10	11	12	13	14	15	16	17	18	19	20	Pos.	Pts
2010	Triple H Team Hegersport	Maserati	ABU; QR; 5	ABU; CR; 9	SIL; QR; NC	SIL; CR; 6	BRN; QR; 13	BRN; CR; Ret	PRI; QR; 8	PRI; CR; 3	SPA; QR; 12	SPA; CR; 2	NÜR; QR; 13	NÜR; CR; 20	ALG; QR; 6	ALG; CR; 9	NAV; QR	NAV; CR	INT; QR; 10	INT; CR; 10	SAN; QR; 11	SAN; CR; 9	17th	48

Sporting positions
Preceded by Roberto Ravaglia	Guia Race winner 1988	Succeeded by Tim Harvey
Preceded by Inaugural	Porsche Supercup champion 1993	Succeeded by Uwe Alzen
