= 1998 FIA GT A1-Ring 500 km =

Layout of the A1-Ring (1996-2003)

The 1998 FIA GT A1-Ring 500 km was the eighth round the 1998 FIA GT Championship season. It took place at the A1-Ring, Austria, on September 20, 1998.

== Official results ==
Class winners are in bold. Cars failing to complete 70% of winner's distance are marked as Not Classified (NC).

Pos	Class	No	Team	Drivers	Chassis	Tyre	Laps
Pos	Class	No	Team	Drivers	Engine	Tyre	Laps
1	**GT1**	**2**	**(Germany) AMG Mercedes**	**(Germany) Klaus Ludwig (Brazil) Ricardo Zonta**	**Mercedes-Benz CLK LM**	**B**	**116**
1	**GT1**	**2**	**(Germany) AMG Mercedes**	**(Germany) Klaus Ludwig (Brazil) Ricardo Zonta**	**Mercedes-Benz M119 6.0L V8**	**B**	**116**
2	GT1	1	(Germany) AMG Mercedes	(Germany) Bernd Schneider (Australia) Mark Webber	Mercedes-Benz CLK LM	**B**	116
2	GT1	1	(Germany) AMG Mercedes	(Germany) Bernd Schneider (Australia) Mark Webber	Mercedes-Benz M119 6.0L V8	**B**	116
3	GT1	7	(Germany) Porsche AG	(France) Yannick Dalmas (United Kingdom) Allan McNish	Porsche 911 GT1-98	**MI**	115
3	GT1	7	(Germany) Porsche AG	(France) Yannick Dalmas (United Kingdom) Allan McNish	Porsche 3.2L Turbo Flat-6	**MI**	115
4	GT1	6	(Germany) Zakspeed Racing	(Germany) Michael Bartels (Italy) Max Angelelli	Porsche 911 GT1-98	**P**	115
4	GT1	6	(Germany) Zakspeed Racing	(Germany) Michael Bartels (Italy) Max Angelelli	Porsche 3.2L Turbo Flat-6	**P**	115
5	GT1	12	(Germany) Team Persson Motorsport	(France) Jean-Marc Gounon (Germany) Marcel Tiemann	Mercedes-Benz CLK GTR	**B**	115
5	GT1	12	(Germany) Team Persson Motorsport	(France) Jean-Marc Gounon (Germany) Marcel Tiemann	Mercedes-Benz M120 6.0L V12	**B**	115
6	GT1	15	(United Kingdom) Davidoff Classic (United Kingdom) GTC Competition	(United Kingdom) Geoff Lees (Germany) Thomas Bscher	McLaren F1 GTR	**G**	112
6	GT1	15	(United Kingdom) Davidoff Classic (United Kingdom) GTC Competition	(United Kingdom) Geoff Lees (Germany) Thomas Bscher	BMW S70 6.0L V12	**G**	112
7	GT1	3	(France) DAMS	(France) Christophe Tinseau (France) Franck Lagorce	Panoz GTR-1	**MI**	109
7	GT1	3	(France) DAMS	(France) Christophe Tinseau (France) Franck Lagorce	Ford (Roush) 6.0L V8	**MI**	109
8	**GT2**	**52**	**(France) Viper Team Oreca**	**(Austria) Karl Wendlinger (United Kingdom) Justin Bell**	**Chrysler Viper GTS-R**	**MI**	**106**
8	**GT2**	**52**	**(France) Viper Team Oreca**	**(Austria) Karl Wendlinger (United Kingdom) Justin Bell**	**Chrysler 8.0L V10**	**MI**	**106**
9	GT2	51	(France) Viper Team Oreca	(Monaco) Olivier Beretta (Portugal) Pedro Lamy	Chrysler Viper GTS-R	**MI**	106
9	GT2	51	(France) Viper Team Oreca	(Monaco) Olivier Beretta (Portugal) Pedro Lamy	Chrysler 8.0L V10	**MI**	106
10	GT2	66	(Germany) Konrad Motorsport	(Germany) Altfrid Heger (Austria) Franz Konrad	Porsche 911 GT2	**D**	105
10	GT2	66	(Germany) Konrad Motorsport	(Germany) Altfrid Heger (Austria) Franz Konrad	Porsche 3.6L Turbo Flat-6	**D**	105
11	GT1	8	(Germany) Porsche AG	(Germany) Jörg Müller (Germany) Uwe Alzen	Porsche 911 GT1-98	**MI**	105
11	GT1	8	(Germany) Porsche AG	(Germany) Jörg Müller (Germany) Uwe Alzen	Porsche 3.2L Turbo Flat-6	**MI**	105
12	GT2	81	(Germany) Freisinger Motorsport	(Germany) Wolfgang Kaufmann (France) Michel Ligonnet	Porsche 911 GT2	?	104
12	GT2	81	(Germany) Freisinger Motorsport	(Germany) Wolfgang Kaufmann (France) Michel Ligonnet	Porsche 3.6L Turbo Flat-6	?	104
13	GT2	63	(Germany) Krauss Race Sports International	(Germany) Michael Trunk (Germany) Bernhard Müller	Porsche 911 GT2	**D**	104
13	GT2	63	(Germany) Krauss Race Sports International	(Germany) Michael Trunk (Germany) Bernhard Müller	Porsche 3.6L Turbo Flat-6	**D**	104
14	GT2	58	(Germany) Roock Sportsystem	(Germany) André Ahrlé (Germany) Sascha Maassen	Porsche 911 GT2	**Y**	104
14	GT2	58	(Germany) Roock Sportsystem	(Germany) André Ahrlé (Germany) Sascha Maassen	Porsche 3.6L Turbo Flat-6	**Y**	104
15	GT2	65	(Germany) Konrad Motorsport	(United Kingdom) Martin Stretton (Switzerland) Toni Seiler	Porsche 911 GT2	**D**	103
15	GT2	65	(Germany) Konrad Motorsport	(United Kingdom) Martin Stretton (Switzerland) Toni Seiler	Porsche 3.6L Turbo Flat-6	**D**	103
16	GT2	60	(Switzerland) Elf Haberthur Racing	(Belgium) Michel Neugarten (Germany) Gerd Ruch (Italy) Marco Spinelli	Porsche 911 GT2	**G**	103
16	GT2	60	(Switzerland) Elf Haberthur Racing	(Belgium) Michel Neugarten (Germany) Gerd Ruch (Italy) Marco Spinelli	Porsche 3.6L Turbo Flat-6	**G**	103
17	GT2	57	(Germany) Roock Racing	(Switzerland) Bruno Eichmann (Netherlands) Mike Hezemans	Porsche 911 GT2	**Y**	103
17	GT2	57	(Germany) Roock Racing	(Switzerland) Bruno Eichmann (Netherlands) Mike Hezemans	Porsche 3.6L Turbo Flat-6	**Y**	103
18	GT2	79	(Germany) RWS	(Germany) Günther Blieninger (Austria) Hans-Jörg Hofer (Italy) Raffaele Sangiuolo	Porsche 911 GT2	?	100
18	GT2	79	(Germany) RWS	(Germany) Günther Blieninger (Austria) Hans-Jörg Hofer (Italy) Raffaele Sangiuolo	Porsche 3.6L Turbo Flat-6	?	100
19	GT2	61	(Switzerland) Elf Haberthur Racing	(Belgium) Bruno Lambert (Italy) Mauro Casadei (Austria) Karl Baron	Porsche 911 GT2	**G**	99
19	GT2	61	(Switzerland) Elf Haberthur Racing	(Belgium) Bruno Lambert (Italy) Mauro Casadei (Austria) Karl Baron	Porsche 3.6L Turbo Flat-6	**G**	99
20	GT2	96	(Germany) Proton Competition	(Austria) Horst Felbermayr, Sr. (Austria) Horst Felbermayr, Jr.	Porsche 911 GT2	**P**	97
20	GT2	96	(Germany) Proton Competition	(Austria) Horst Felbermayr, Sr. (Austria) Horst Felbermayr, Jr.	Porsche 3.6L Turbo Flat-6	**P**	97
21	GT1	5	(Germany) Zakspeed Racing	(Germany) Armin Hahne (Germany) Andreas Scheld	Porsche 911 GT1-98	**P**	97
21	GT1	5	(Germany) Zakspeed Racing	(Germany) Armin Hahne (Germany) Andreas Scheld	Porsche 3.2L Turbo Flat-6	**P**	97
22	GT2	56	(Germany) Roock Racing	(Germany) Claudia Hürtgen (France) Stéphane Ortelli	Porsche 911 GT2	**Y**	89
22	GT2	56	(Germany) Roock Racing	(Germany) Claudia Hürtgen (France) Stéphane Ortelli	Porsche 3.6L Turbo Flat-6	**Y**	89
23	GT1	11	(Germany) Team Persson Motorsport	(France) Christophe Bouchut (Germany) Bernd Mayländer	Mercedes-Benz CLK GTR	**B**	86
23	GT1	11	(Germany) Team Persson Motorsport	(France) Christophe Bouchut (Germany) Bernd Mayländer	Mercedes-Benz M120 6.0L V12	**B**	86
24 DNF	GT2	67	(Germany) Remus Racing	(Germany) Wido Rössler (Germany) Herbert Drexler	Porsche 911 GT2	?	56
24 DNF	GT2	67	(Germany) Remus Racing	(Germany) Wido Rössler (Germany) Herbert Drexler	Porsche 3.6L Turbo Flat-6	?	56
25 DNF	GT2	69	(Germany) Proton Competition	(Germany) Gerold Ried (France) Patrick Vuillaume	Porsche 911 GT2	**P**	50
25 DNF	GT2	69	(Germany) Proton Competition	(Germany) Gerold Ried (France) Patrick Vuillaume	Porsche 3.6L Turbo Flat-6	**P**	50
26 DNF	GT2	62	(Switzerland) Stadler Motorsport	(Germany) Axel Röhr (Switzerland) Uwe Sick	Porsche 911 GT2	**P**	47
26 DNF	GT2	62	(Switzerland) Stadler Motorsport	(Germany) Axel Röhr (Switzerland) Uwe Sick	Porsche 3.6L Turbo Flat-6	**P**	47
27 DNF	GT2	70	(Netherlands) Marcos Racing International	(United Kingdom) Christian Vann (Germany) Harald Becker (Netherlands) Cor Euser	Marcos LM600	**D**	46
27 DNF	GT2	70	(Netherlands) Marcos Racing International	(United Kingdom) Christian Vann (Germany) Harald Becker (Netherlands) Cor Euser	Chevrolet 5.9L V8	**D**	46
28 DNF	GT2	78	(Hungary) Bovi Motorsport	(Hungary) Kálmán Bódis (Hungary) Ferenc Rátkai	Porsche 911 GT2	?	46
28 DNF	GT2	78	(Hungary) Bovi Motorsport	(Hungary) Kálmán Bódis (Hungary) Ferenc Rátkai	Porsche 3.6L Turbo Flat-6	?	46
29 DNF	GT2	53	(United Kingdom) Chamberlain Engineering	(Austria) Manfred Stohl (Portugal) Ni Amorim	Chrysler Viper GTS-R	**D**	11
29 DNF	GT2	53	(United Kingdom) Chamberlain Engineering	(Austria) Manfred Stohl (Portugal) Ni Amorim	Chrysler 8.0L V10	**D**	11
30 DNF	GT2	76	(Germany) Seikel Motorsport	(Germany) Ernst Palmberger (Germany) Gerhard Marchner (Austria) Manfred Jurasz	Porsche 911 GT2	**P**	3
30 DNF	GT2	76	(Germany) Seikel Motorsport	(Germany) Ernst Palmberger (Germany) Gerhard Marchner (Austria) Manfred Jurasz	Porsche 3.6L Turbo Flat-6	**P**	3

== Statistics ==
- Pole position – #2 AMG Mercedes – 1:22.166
- Fastest lap – #1 AMG Mercedes – 1:23.802
- Average speed – 179.375 km/h

FIA GT Championship
Previous race: 1998 FIA GT Donington 500km	1998 season	Next race: 1998 FIA GT Homestead 500km
