= 1998 Suzuka 1000 km =

1998 1000 km Suzuka

Seasons
- ← 1997 1999 →

Layout of the Suzuka International Racing Course (1987-2002)

The 1998 Suzuka 1000 km was the nineteenth running of the 1000km Suzuka and the sixth round the 1998 FIA GT Championship season. It took place at the Suzuka Circuit, Japan, on August 23, 1998.

GT500 and GT300 class cars from the All-Japan Grand Touring Car Championship (JGTC) were allowed to participate on an exhibitional basis, but were not allowed to score points in the FIA GT Championship.

== Official results ==
Class winners are in bold. Cars failing to complete 70% of winner's distance are marked as Not Classified (NC).

Pos	Class	No	Team	Drivers	Chassis	Tyre	Laps
Pos	Class	No	Team	Drivers	Engine	Tyre	Laps
1	**GT1**	**1**	**(Germany) AMG Mercedes**	**(Germany) Bernd Schneider (Australia) Mark Webber**	**Mercedes-Benz CLK LM**	**B**	**171**
1	**GT1**	**1**	**(Germany) AMG Mercedes**	**(Germany) Bernd Schneider (Australia) Mark Webber**	**Mercedes-Benz M119 6.0L V8**	**B**	**171**
2	GT1	2	(Germany) AMG Mercedes	(Germany) Klaus Ludwig (Brazil) Ricardo Zonta	Mercedes-Benz CLK LM	**B**	169
2	GT1	2	(Germany) AMG Mercedes	(Germany) Klaus Ludwig (Brazil) Ricardo Zonta	Mercedes-Benz M119 6.0L V8	**B**	169
3	GT1	7	(Germany) Porsche AG	(France) Yannick Dalmas (France) Stéphane Ortelli (United Kingdom) Allan McNish	Porsche 911 GT1-98	**M**	168
3	GT1	7	(Germany) Porsche AG	(France) Yannick Dalmas (France) Stéphane Ortelli (United Kingdom) Allan McNish	Porsche 3.2L Turbo Flat-6	**M**	168
4	GT1	11	(Germany) Team Persson Motorsport	(France) Christophe Bouchut (Germany) Bernd Mayländer	Mercedes-Benz CLK GTR	**B**	167
4	GT1	11	(Germany) Team Persson Motorsport	(France) Christophe Bouchut (Germany) Bernd Mayländer	Mercedes-Benz M120 6.0L V12	**B**	167
5	GT1	3	(France) DAMS	(France) Franck Lagorce (France) Christophe Tinseau (United States) Johnny O'Connell	Panoz GTR-1	**M**	165
5	GT1	3	(France) DAMS	(France) Franck Lagorce (France) Christophe Tinseau (United States) Johnny O'Connell	Ford (Roush) 6.0L V8	**M**	165
6	GT1	6	(Germany) Zakspeed Racing	(Germany) Michael Bartels (Germany) Alexander Grau (Germany) Andreas Scheld	Porsche 911 GT1-98	**P**	165
6	GT1	6	(Germany) Zakspeed Racing	(Germany) Michael Bartels (Germany) Alexander Grau (Germany) Andreas Scheld	Porsche 3.2L Turbo Flat-6	**P**	165
7	GT1	12	(Germany) Team Persson Motorsport	(France) Jean-Marc Gounon (Germany) Marcel Tiemann	Mercedes-Benz CLK GTR	**B**	163
7	GT1	12	(Germany) Team Persson Motorsport	(France) Jean-Marc Gounon (Germany) Marcel Tiemann	Mercedes-Benz M120 6.0L V12	**B**	163
8	GT1	5	(Germany) Zakspeed Racing	(Germany) Armin Hahne (France) Fabien Giroix (Switzerland) Jean-Denis Délétraz	Porsche 911 GT1-98	**P**	163
8	GT1	5	(Germany) Zakspeed Racing	(Germany) Armin Hahne (France) Fabien Giroix (Switzerland) Jean-Denis Délétraz	Porsche 3.2L Turbo Flat-6	**P**	163
9	**GT2**	**51**	**(France) Viper Team Oreca**	**(Monaco) Olivier Beretta (Portugal) Pedro Lamy (France) Dominique Dupuy**	**Chrysler Viper GTS-R**	**M**	**155**
9	**GT2**	**51**	**(France) Viper Team Oreca**	**(Monaco) Olivier Beretta (Portugal) Pedro Lamy (France) Dominique Dupuy**	**Chrysler 8.0L V10**	**M**	**155**
10	GT2	52	(France) Viper Team Oreca	(Austria) Karl Wendlinger (United Kingdom) Justin Bell (Japan) Hideshi Matsuda	Chrysler Viper GTS-R	**M**	155
10	GT2	52	(France) Viper Team Oreca	(Austria) Karl Wendlinger (United Kingdom) Justin Bell (Japan) Hideshi Matsuda	Chrysler 8.0L V10	**M**	155
11	GT2	70	(Netherlands) Marcos Racing International	(United Kingdom) Christian Vann (Germany) Harald Becker (Netherlands) Cor Euser	Marcos LM600	**D**	152
11	GT2	70	(Netherlands) Marcos Racing International	(United Kingdom) Christian Vann (Germany) Harald Becker (Netherlands) Cor Euser	Chevrolet 5.9L V8	**D**	152
12	GT2	66	(Germany) Konrad Motorsport	(Germany) Altfrid Heger (Austria) Franz Konrad (France) Stéphane Sallaz	Porsche 911 GT2	**D**	150
12	GT2	66	(Germany) Konrad Motorsport	(Germany) Altfrid Heger (Austria) Franz Konrad (France) Stéphane Sallaz	Porsche 3.6L Turbo Flat-6	**D**	150
13	GT2	60	(Switzerland) Elf Haberthur Racing	(Belgium) Michel Neugarten (Germany) Gerd Ruch (France) Michel Ligonnet	Porsche 911 GT2	**G**	146
13	GT2	60	(Switzerland) Elf Haberthur Racing	(Belgium) Michel Neugarten (Germany) Gerd Ruch (France) Michel Ligonnet	Porsche 3.6L Turbo Flat-6	**G**	146
14	GT2	53	(United Kingdom) Chamberlain Engineering	(Netherlands) Hans Hugenholtz (United States) Matt Turner (Japan) Hiroshi Sakai	Chrysler Viper GTS-R	**D**	145
14	GT2	53	(United Kingdom) Chamberlain Engineering	(Netherlands) Hans Hugenholtz (United States) Matt Turner (Japan) Hiroshi Sakai	Chrysler 8.0L V10	**D**	145
15	GT2	56	(Germany) Roock Racing	(Germany) Claudia Hürtgen (Netherlands) Jan Lammers (Netherlands) Mike Hezemans	Porsche 911 GT2	**Y**	144
15	GT2	56	(Germany) Roock Racing	(Germany) Claudia Hürtgen (Netherlands) Jan Lammers (Netherlands) Mike Hezemans	Porsche 3.6L Turbo Flat-6	**Y**	144
16	GT2	76	(Germany) Seikel Motorsport	(Japan) Takashi Suzuki (United Kingdom) Nigel Smith	Porsche 911 GT2	**P**	141
16	GT2	76	(Germany) Seikel Motorsport	(Japan) Takashi Suzuki (United Kingdom) Nigel Smith	Porsche 3.6L Turbo Flat-6	**P**	141
17	GT2	69	(Germany) Proton Competition	(Germany) Gerold Ried (France) Patrick Vuillaume (Austria) Manfred Jurasz	Porsche 911 GT2	**P**	140
17	GT2	69	(Germany) Proton Competition	(Germany) Gerold Ried (France) Patrick Vuillaume (Austria) Manfred Jurasz	Porsche 3.6L Turbo Flat-6	**P**	140
18	**GT300**	**181**	**(Japan) Team Daishin**	**(Japan) Hideo Fukuyama (Japan) Nobuyuki Ooyagi (Japan) Tatsuya Mizutani**	**Nissan Silvia**	**D**	**140**
18	**GT300**	**181**	**(Japan) Team Daishin**	**(Japan) Hideo Fukuyama (Japan) Nobuyuki Ooyagi (Japan) Tatsuya Mizutani**	**Nissan SR20 2.0L Turbo I4**	**D**	**140**
19	GT2	61	(Switzerland) Elf Haberthur Racing	(France) Eric Graham (France) David Smadja (Japan) Masahiro Kimoto	Porsche 911 GT2	**G**	139
19	GT2	61	(Switzerland) Elf Haberthur Racing	(France) Eric Graham (France) David Smadja (Japan) Masahiro Kimoto	Porsche 3.6L Turbo Flat-6	**G**	139
20	GT300	170	(Japan) Team Gaikokuya	(Japan) Yoshimi Ishibashi (Japan) Hiroyuki Noji (Belgium) Patrick van Schoote	Porsche 911 GT2	**D**	137
20	GT300	170	(Japan) Team Gaikokuya	(Japan) Yoshimi Ishibashi (Japan) Hiroyuki Noji (Belgium) Patrick van Schoote	Porsche 3.6L Turbo Flat-6	**D**	137
21	GT300	128	(Japan) NSX Dream 28 Competition	(Japan) Hajime Ooshiro (Japan) Kazuho Takahashi (Japan) Tadayuki Sato	Honda NSX-S	?	128
21	GT300	128	(Japan) NSX Dream 28 Competition	(Japan) Hajime Ooshiro (Japan) Kazuho Takahashi (Japan) Tadayuki Sato	Honda 3.2L V6	?	128
22	**GT500**	**129**	**(Japan) IDC SARD Racing Team**	**(Japan) Keiichi Tsuchiya (Japan) Tatsuya Tanigawa (Italy) Max Angelelli**	**Toyota Supra**	**Y**	**126**
22	**GT500**	**129**	**(Japan) IDC SARD Racing Team**	**(Japan) Keiichi Tsuchiya (Japan) Tatsuya Tanigawa (Italy) Max Angelelli**	**Toyota 2.1L Turbo I4**	**Y**	**126**
23	GT2	87	(Germany) Seikel Motorsport	(Germany) Gerhard Marchner (Japan) Sumio Sakurai Suzuki (Japan) Tomiko Yoshikawa	Porsche 911 GT2	**P**	122
23	GT2	87	(Germany) Seikel Motorsport	(Germany) Gerhard Marchner (Japan) Sumio Sakurai Suzuki (Japan) Tomiko Yoshikawa	Porsche 3.6L Turbo Flat-6	**P**	122
24 DNF	GT1	8	(Germany) Porsche AG	(France) Bob Wollek (Germany) Jörg Müller (Germany) Uwe Alzen	Porsche 911 GT1-98	**M**	107
24 DNF	GT1	8	(Germany) Porsche AG	(France) Bob Wollek (Germany) Jörg Müller (Germany) Uwe Alzen	Porsche 3.2L Turbo Flat-6	**M**	107
25 DNF	GT1	15	(United Kingdom) Davidoff Classic (United Kingdom) GTC Competition	(United Kingdom) Geoff Lees (Germany) Thomas Bscher	McLaren F1 GTR	**G**	106
25 DNF	GT1	15	(United Kingdom) Davidoff Classic (United Kingdom) GTC Competition	(United Kingdom) Geoff Lees (Germany) Thomas Bscher	BMW S70 6.0L V12	**G**	106
26 DNF	GT2	62	(Switzerland) Stadler Motorsport	(Switzerland) Franz Hunkeler (Switzerland) Uwe Sick (Switzerland) Jörg Clavuot	Porsche 911 GT2	**P**	85
26 DNF	GT2	62	(Switzerland) Stadler Motorsport	(Switzerland) Franz Hunkeler (Switzerland) Uwe Sick (Switzerland) Jörg Clavuot	Porsche 3.6L Turbo Flat-6	**P**	85
27 DNF	GT2	58	(Germany) Roock Sportsystem	(Germany) André Ahrlé (Thailand) Ratanakul Prutirat (United Kingdom) Robert Nearn	Porsche 911 GT2	**Y**	74
27 DNF	GT2	58	(Germany) Roock Sportsystem	(Germany) André Ahrlé (Thailand) Ratanakul Prutirat (United Kingdom) Robert Nearn	Porsche 3.6L Turbo Flat-6	**Y**	74
28 DNF	GT2	65	(Germany) Konrad Motorsport	(United Kingdom) Martin Stretton (Japan) Yukihiro Hane (Japan) Jun Harada	Porsche 911 GT2	**D**	63
28 DNF	GT2	65	(Germany) Konrad Motorsport	(United Kingdom) Martin Stretton (Japan) Yukihiro Hane (Japan) Jun Harada	Porsche 3.6L Turbo Flat-6	**D**	63
29 DNF	GT2	57	(Germany) Roock Racing	(Germany) Sascha Maassen (Switzerland) Bruno Eichmann (Japan) Hisashi Wada	Porsche 911 GT2	**Y**	46
29 DNF	GT2	57	(Germany) Roock Racing	(Germany) Sascha Maassen (Switzerland) Bruno Eichmann (Japan) Hisashi Wada	Porsche 3.6L Turbo Flat-6	**Y**	46
30 DNF	GT500	100	(Japan) Team Kunimitsu with Mooncraft	(Japan) Kunimitsu Takahashi (Japan) Akira Iida (Japan) Ryo Michigami	Honda NSX-S	**B**	31
30 DNF	GT500	100	(Japan) Team Kunimitsu with Mooncraft	(Japan) Kunimitsu Takahashi (Japan) Akira Iida (Japan) Ryo Michigami	Honda 3.5L V6	**B**	31
DSQ^{†}	GT300	110	(Japan) Ability	(Japan) Hidehiko Aso (Japan) Akira Ishikawa (Japan) Yasutaka Hinoi	Porsche 911 GT2	**D**	136
DSQ^{†}	GT300	110	(Japan) Ability	(Japan) Hidehiko Aso (Japan) Akira Ishikawa (Japan) Yasutaka Hinoi	Porsche 3.6L Turbo Flat-6	**D**	136

† – #110 Ability was disqualified for failing to respond to a black flag.

== Statistics ==
- Pole position – #1 Bernd Schneider – 1:52.580
- Fastest lap – #7 Allan McNish – 1:56.416
- Average speed – 172.405 km/h

FIA GT Championship
Previous race: 1998 FIA GT Budapest 500km	1998 season	Next race: 1998 FIA GT Donington 500km
