= 1998 FIA GT Donington 500 km =

Layout of the Donington Park

The 1998 FIA GT Donington 500 km was the seventh round the 1998 FIA GT Championship season. It took place at Donington Park, United Kingdom, on 6 September 1998.

== Official results ==
Class winners are in bold. Cars failing to complete 70% of winner's distance are marked as Not Classified (NC).

Pos	Class	No	Team	Drivers	Chassis	Tyre	Laps
Pos	Class	No	Team	Drivers	Engine	Tyre	Laps
1	**GT1**	**1**	**(Germany) AMG Mercedes**	**(Germany) Bernd Schneider (Australia) Mark Webber**	**Mercedes-Benz CLK LM**	**B**	**125**
1	**GT1**	**1**	**(Germany) AMG Mercedes**	**(Germany) Bernd Schneider (Australia) Mark Webber**	**Mercedes-Benz M119 6.0L V8**	**B**	**125**
2	GT1	2	(Germany) AMG Mercedes	(Germany) Klaus Ludwig (Brazil) Ricardo Zonta	Mercedes-Benz CLK LM	**B**	125
2	GT1	2	(Germany) AMG Mercedes	(Germany) Klaus Ludwig (Brazil) Ricardo Zonta	Mercedes-Benz M119 6.0L V8	**B**	125
3	GT1	7	(Germany) Porsche AG	(France) Yannick Dalmas (United Kingdom) Allan McNish	Porsche 911 GT1-98	**MI**	124
3	GT1	7	(Germany) Porsche AG	(France) Yannick Dalmas (United Kingdom) Allan McNish	Porsche 3.2L Turbo Flat-6	**MI**	124
4	GT1	8	(Germany) Porsche AG	(Germany) Jörg Müller (Germany) Uwe Alzen	Porsche 911 GT1-98	**MI**	123
4	GT1	8	(Germany) Porsche AG	(Germany) Jörg Müller (Germany) Uwe Alzen	Porsche 3.2L Turbo Flat-6	**MI**	123
5	GT1	12	(Germany) Team Persson Motorsport	(France) Jean-Marc Gounon (Germany) Marcel Tiemann	Mercedes-Benz CLK GTR	**B**	123
5	GT1	12	(Germany) Team Persson Motorsport	(France) Jean-Marc Gounon (Germany) Marcel Tiemann	Mercedes-Benz M120 6.0L V12	**B**	123
6	GT1	5	(Germany) Zakspeed Racing	(Germany) Armin Hahne (Germany) Andreas Scheld	Porsche 911 GT1-98	**P**	121
6	GT1	5	(Germany) Zakspeed Racing	(Germany) Armin Hahne (Germany) Andreas Scheld	Porsche 3.2L Turbo Flat-6	**P**	121
7	GT1	15	(United Kingdom) Davidoff Classic (United Kingdom) GTC Competition	(United Kingdom) Geoff Lees (Germany) Thomas Bscher	McLaren F1 GTR	**G**	120
7	GT1	15	(United Kingdom) Davidoff Classic (United Kingdom) GTC Competition	(United Kingdom) Geoff Lees (Germany) Thomas Bscher	BMW S70 6.0L V12	**G**	120
8	**GT2**	**51**	**(France) Viper Team Oreca**	**(Monaco) Olivier Beretta (Portugal) Pedro Lamy**	**Chrysler Viper GTS-R**	**MI**	**114**
8	**GT2**	**51**	**(France) Viper Team Oreca**	**(Monaco) Olivier Beretta (Portugal) Pedro Lamy**	**Chrysler 8.0L V10**	**MI**	**114**
9	GT2	66	(Germany) Konrad Motorsport	(Germany) Altfrid Heger (Austria) Franz Konrad	Porsche 911 GT2	**D**	112
9	GT2	66	(Germany) Konrad Motorsport	(Germany) Altfrid Heger (Austria) Franz Konrad	Porsche 3.6L Turbo Flat-6	**D**	112
10	GT2	52	(France) Viper Team Oreca	(Austria) Karl Wendlinger (United Kingdom) Justin Bell	Chrysler Viper GTS-R	**MI**	111
10	GT2	52	(France) Viper Team Oreca	(Austria) Karl Wendlinger (United Kingdom) Justin Bell	Chrysler 8.0L V10	**MI**	111
11	GT2	81	(Germany) Freisinger Motorsport	(Germany) Wolfgang Kaufmann (France) Michel Ligonnet	Porsche 911 GT2	?	111
11	GT2	81	(Germany) Freisinger Motorsport	(Germany) Wolfgang Kaufmann (France) Michel Ligonnet	Porsche 3.6L Turbo Flat-6	?	111
12	GT1	11	(Germany) Team Persson Motorsport	(France) Christophe Bouchut (Germany) Bernd Mayländer	Mercedes-Benz CLK GTR	**B**	111
12	GT1	11	(Germany) Team Persson Motorsport	(France) Christophe Bouchut (Germany) Bernd Mayländer	Mercedes-Benz M120 6.0L V12	**B**	111
13	GT2	65	(Germany) Konrad Motorsport	(United Kingdom) Martin Stretton (Switzerland) Toni Seiler	Porsche 911 GT2	**D**	109
13	GT2	65	(Germany) Konrad Motorsport	(United Kingdom) Martin Stretton (Switzerland) Toni Seiler	Porsche 3.6L Turbo Flat-6	**D**	109
14	GT2	53	(United Kingdom) Chamberlain Engineering	(United Kingdom) Martin Short (United States) Matt Turner (Portugal) Ni Amorim	Chrysler Viper GTS-R	**D**	109
14	GT2	53	(United Kingdom) Chamberlain Engineering	(United Kingdom) Martin Short (United States) Matt Turner (Portugal) Ni Amorim	Chrysler 8.0L V10	**D**	109
15	GT2	63	(Germany) Krauss Race Sports International	(Germany) Michael Trunk (Germany) Bernhard Müller	Porsche 911 GT2	**D**	109
15	GT2	63	(Germany) Krauss Race Sports International	(Germany) Michael Trunk (Germany) Bernhard Müller	Porsche 3.6L Turbo Flat-6	**D**	109
16	GT2	96	(Germany) Proton Competition	(Austria) Horst Felbermayr Sr. (Austria) Horst Felbermayr Jr.	Porsche 911 GT2	**P**	107
16	GT2	96	(Germany) Proton Competition	(Austria) Horst Felbermayr Sr. (Austria) Horst Felbermayr Jr.	Porsche 3.6L Turbo Flat-6	**P**	107
17	GT2	69	(Germany) Proton Competition	(Germany) Gerold Ried (France) Patrick Vuillaume	Porsche 911 GT2	**P**	104
17	GT2	69	(Germany) Proton Competition	(Germany) Gerold Ried (France) Patrick Vuillaume	Porsche 3.6L Turbo Flat-6	**P**	104
18	GT2	98	(United Kingdom) Cirtek Motorsport	(United Kingdom) David Warnock (United Kingdom) Robert Nearn (Germany) Sascha Maassen	Porsche 911 GT2	**D**	101
18	GT2	98	(United Kingdom) Cirtek Motorsport	(United Kingdom) David Warnock (United Kingdom) Robert Nearn (Germany) Sascha Maassen	Porsche 3.6L Turbo Flat-6	**D**	101
19	GT2	61	(Switzerland) Elf Haberthur Racing	(France) Eric Graham (France) David Smadja (France) Emmanuel Clérico	Porsche 911 GT2	**G**	98
19	GT2	61	(Switzerland) Elf Haberthur Racing	(France) Eric Graham (France) David Smadja (France) Emmanuel Clérico	Porsche 3.6L Turbo Flat-6	**G**	98
20	GT2	57	(Germany) Roock Racing	(Switzerland) Bruno Eichmann (Germany) André Ahrlé (Netherlands) Mike Hezemans	Porsche 911 GT2	**Y**	94
20	GT2	57	(Germany) Roock Racing	(Switzerland) Bruno Eichmann (Germany) André Ahrlé (Netherlands) Mike Hezemans	Porsche 3.6L Turbo Flat-6	**Y**	94
21	GT2	56	(Germany) Roock Racing	(Germany) Claudia Hürtgen (France) Stéphane Ortelli	Porsche 911 GT2	**Y**	82
21	GT2	56	(Germany) Roock Racing	(Germany) Claudia Hürtgen (France) Stéphane Ortelli	Porsche 3.6L Turbo Flat-6	**Y**	82
22 NC	GT1	6	(Germany) Zakspeed Racing	(Germany) Michael Bartels (Italy) Max Angelelli	Porsche 911 GT1-98	**P**	83
22 NC	GT1	6	(Germany) Zakspeed Racing	(Germany) Michael Bartels (Italy) Max Angelelli	Porsche 3.2L Turbo Flat-6	**P**	83
23 DNF	GT2	60	(Switzerland) Elf Haberthur Racing	(Belgium) Michel Neugarten (Germany) Gerd Ruch (Italy) Marco Spinelli	Porsche 911 GT2	**G**	59
23 DNF	GT2	60	(Switzerland) Elf Haberthur Racing	(Belgium) Michel Neugarten (Germany) Gerd Ruch (Italy) Marco Spinelli	Porsche 3.6L Turbo Flat-6	**G**	59
24 DNF	GT1	3	(France) DAMS	(France) Éric Bernard (Australia) David Brabham	Panoz GTR-1	**MI**	56
24 DNF	GT1	3	(France) DAMS	(France) Éric Bernard (Australia) David Brabham	Ford (Roush) 6.0L V8	**MI**	56
25 DNF	GT2	62	(Switzerland) Stadler Motorsport	(Germany) Axel Röhr (Switzerland) Uwe Sick	Porsche 911 GT2	**P**	40
25 DNF	GT2	62	(Switzerland) Stadler Motorsport	(Germany) Axel Röhr (Switzerland) Uwe Sick	Porsche 3.6L Turbo Flat-6	**P**	40
26 DNF	GT2	76	(Germany) Seikel Motorsport	(United Kingdom) Nigel Smith (France) Jean-François Véroux (Morocco) Max Cohen-Olivar	Porsche 911 GT2	**P**	26
26 DNF	GT2	76	(Germany) Seikel Motorsport	(United Kingdom) Nigel Smith (France) Jean-François Véroux (Morocco) Max Cohen-Olivar	Porsche 3.6L Turbo Flat-6	**P**	26
DSQ^{†}	GT2	70	(Netherlands) Marcos Racing International	(United Kingdom) Christian Vann (Germany) Harald Becker (Netherlands) Cor Euser	Marcos LM600	**D**	112
DSQ^{†}	GT2	70	(Netherlands) Marcos Racing International	(United Kingdom) Christian Vann (Germany) Harald Becker (Netherlands) Cor Euser	Chevrolet 5.9L V8	**D**	112
DSQ^{‡}	GT2	58	(Germany) Roock Sportsystem	(United Kingdom) John Robinson (United Kingdom) Hugh Price	Porsche 911 GT2	**Y**	106
DSQ^{‡}	GT2	58	(Germany) Roock Sportsystem	(United Kingdom) John Robinson (United Kingdom) Hugh Price	Porsche 3.6L Turbo Flat-6	**Y**	106

† – #70 Marcos Racing International was disqualified for failing post-race technical inspection. The car was found to have used fuel which did not meet FIA regulations.

‡ – #58 Roock Sportsystem was disqualified for failing post-race technical inspection. The car was found to have used an illegal amount of turbo boost.

== Statistics ==
- Pole position – #2 AMG Mercedes – 1:22.870
- Fastest lap – #1 AMG Mercedes – 1:25.550
- Average speed – 162.962 km/h

FIA GT Championship
Previous race: 1998 Suzuka 1000km	1998 season	Next race: 1998 FIA GT A1-Ring 500 km
