= Mercedes-Benz CLR =

German sports prototype race car

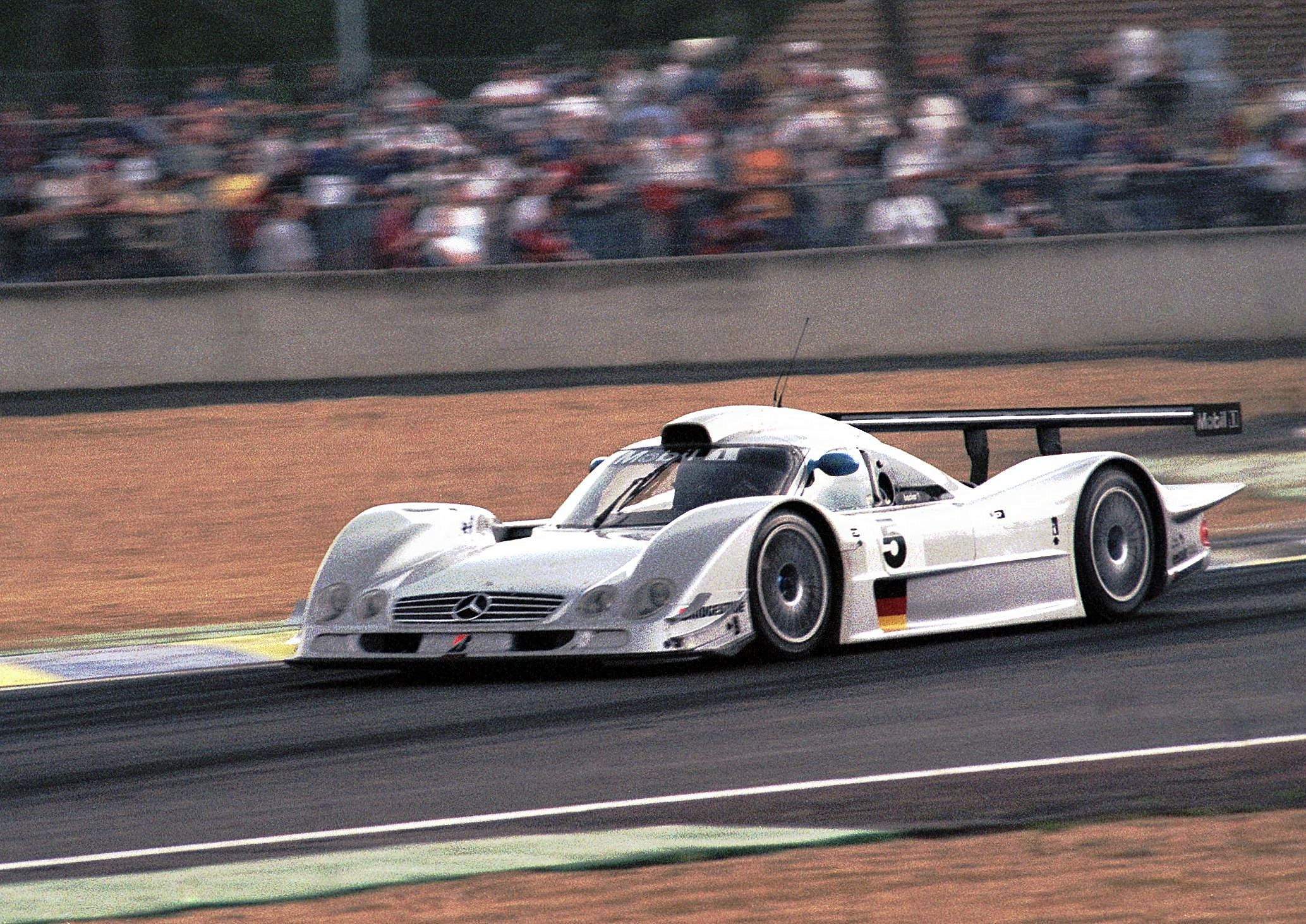
- The No. 5 CLR during the 1999 24 Hours of Le Mans
- Category: Le Mans Grand Touring Prototype (LMGTP)
- Constructor: Mercedes-Benz
- Designer: Gerhard Ungar
- Predecessor: Mercedes-Benz CLK LM

Technical specifications
- Chassis: Carbon fibre and aluminium honeycomb monocoque
- Suspension (front): Double wishbone suspension with pushrod-activated dampers
- Suspension (rear): Same as front
- Length: 4,893 mm (192.6 in)
- Width: 1,999 mm (78.7 in)
- Height: 1,012 mm (39.8 in)
- Wheelbase: 2,670 mm (105 in)
- Engine: Mercedes-Benz GT108C 5,721 cc (349.1 cu in) V8, naturally-aspirated, mid-mounted
- Transmission: Xtrac 6-speed sequential manual
- Weight: Appr. 900 kg (2,000 lb)
- Fuel: Mobil 1
- Tyres: Bridgestone

Competition history
- Notable entrants: AMG-Mercedes
- Notable drivers: (Germany) Bernd Schneider (Germany) Nick Heidfeld (Germany) Marcel Tiemann (France) Franck Lagorce (France) Jean-Marc Gounon (France) Christophe Bouchut (Australia) Mark Webber (Portugal) Pedro Lamy (United Kingdom) Peter Dumbreck
- Debut: 1999 24 Hours of Le Mans
- Last event: 1999 24 Hours of Le Mans
Races	Wins	Poles	F/Laps
1	0	0	0

The Mercedes-Benz CLR was a prototype race car developed by Mercedes-Benz in collaboration with in-house tuning division AMG and motorsports specialists HWA GmbH. Designed to meet Le Mans Grand Touring Prototype (LMGTP) regulations, the CLRs were intended to compete in sports car events during 1999, most notably at the 24 Hours of Le Mans which Mercedes had last won in 1989. It was the third iteration in Mercedes' 1990s sports cars, succeeding the Mercedes-Benz CLK LM, which in turn was born of the CLK GTR. Similar to its predecessors, CLR retained elements of Mercedes-Benz's production cars, including a V8 engine loosely based on the Mercedes M119 as well as a front fascia, headlamps, and grille inspired by the then new Mercedes flagship CL Class.

Three CLRs were entered for Le Mans in 1999 after the team performed nearly 22,000 mi (35,000 km) of testing. The cars suffered aerodynamic instabilities along the circuit's long high-speed straight sections. The car of Australian Mark Webber became airborne and crashed in qualifying, requiring it to be rebuilt. Webber and the repaired CLR returned to the track in a final practice session on the morning of the race, but during its first lap around the circuit, the car once again became airborne and landed on its roof. Mercedes withdrew the damaged CLR but chose to continue in the race despite the accidents. The remaining cars were hastily altered and the drivers were given instructions to avoid closely following other cars.

Nearly four hours into the race, Scotsman Peter Dumbreck was battling amongst the race leaders when his CLR suffered the same instability and became airborne, this time vaulting the circuit's safety barriers, crashing into trees and then coming to rest in an open field after several somersaults. This and earlier incidents led Mercedes not only to withdraw its remaining car from the event immediately, but also to cancel the entire CLR programme and move the company out of sports car racing. The accidents led to changes in the regulations dictating the design of Le Mans racing cars as well as alterations to the circuit itself to increase safety.

== Background ==
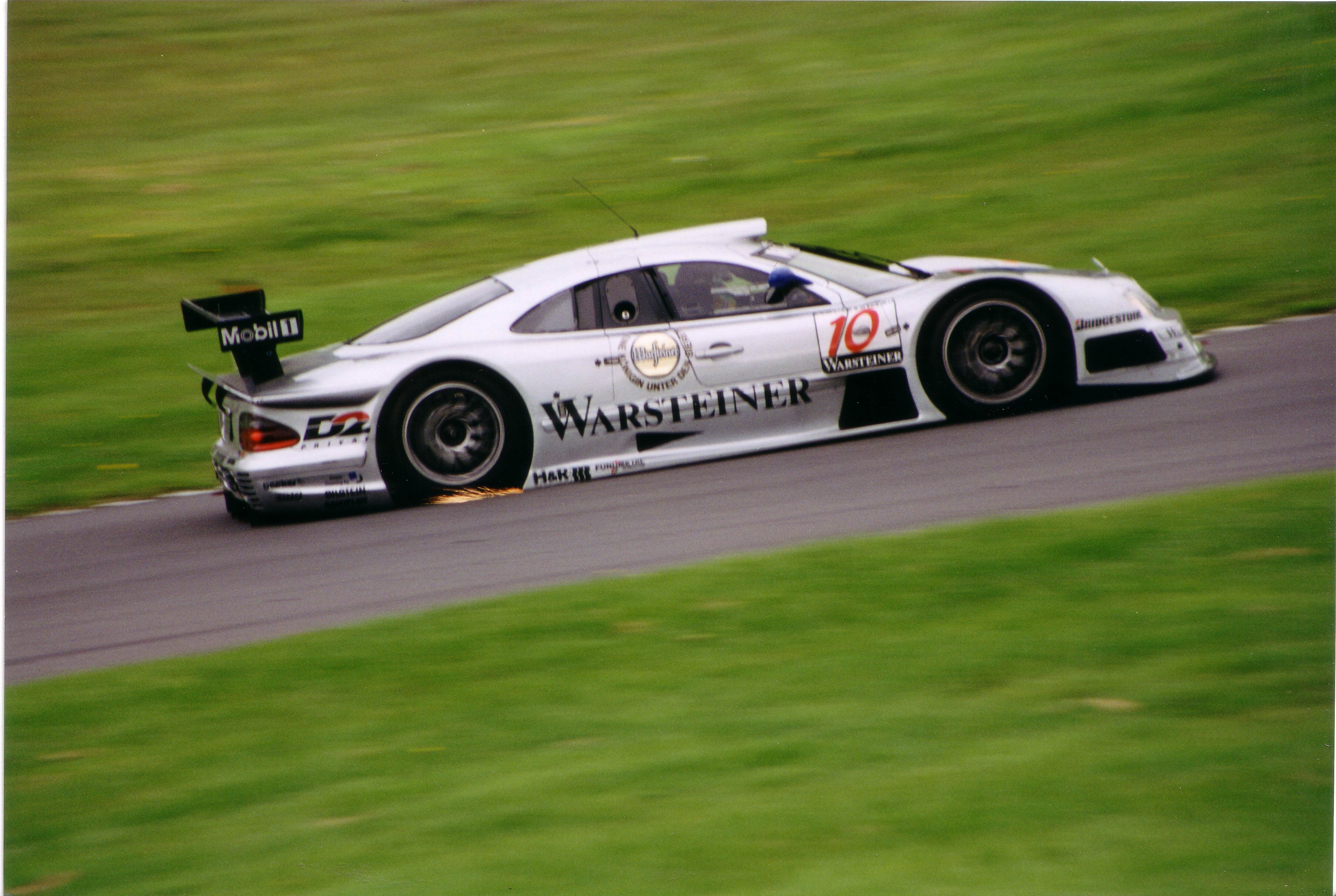
A CLK GTR competing in the FIA GT Championship

In 1996 Mercedes-Benz's motorsports programmes included support for cars in Formula One, IndyCar, and the International Touring Car Championship (ITC). Following the collapse of the ITC at the end of the 1996 season, Mercedes' attention shifted to a new international series, the FIA GT Championship. Racing partners AMG were tasked with developing a design to meet the Fédération Internationale de l'Automobile's GT1 regulations for the new championship. The new cars, known as CLK GTRs, were designed for use both as racing and road cars available to the public, as series regulations required the racing cars to be based on production models. The CLK GTRs were successful in their debut season, winning seven of eleven races and earning both the drivers' and teams' championships.

For the 1998 season AMG refined the CLK GTR's design with the launch of the new CLK LM. A major change for the new design was the replacement of the CLK GTR's V12 engine with a smaller V8, thought by Mercedes to be more suitable to take on longer endurance events such as the 24 Hours of Le Mans, a race not part of the FIA GT calendar. Despite earning pole position for Le Mans, the new cars were unreliable and both lasted less than three hours before retiring with mechanical failure. The race was won by Mercedes' FIA GT rivals Porsche. Mercedes did go on to win its second straight FIA GT Championships later that year after winning all ten races.

After the dominance of Mercedes, most of the GT1 class competitors chose to not return to the FIA GT Championship for 1999, leading the FIA to eliminate the category from the series. The Automobile Club de l'Ouest (ACO), organisers of the 24 Hours of Le Mans, chose to follow the FIA's lead and no longer allow GT1 category cars to enter Le Mans. While FIA GT concentrated solely on its lower GT2 category in 1999, the ACO created a new category of race car known as a Le Mans Grand Touring Prototype (LMGTP). The LMGTP regulations for closed-cockpit cars were similar to the former GT1 regulations but shared many elements with the ACO's existing open-cockpit Le Mans Prototype (LMP) category. Mercedes, no longer able to compete in the FIA GT Championship with the CLK LMs, chose to concentrate on the ACO's new LMGTP category.

== Development ==
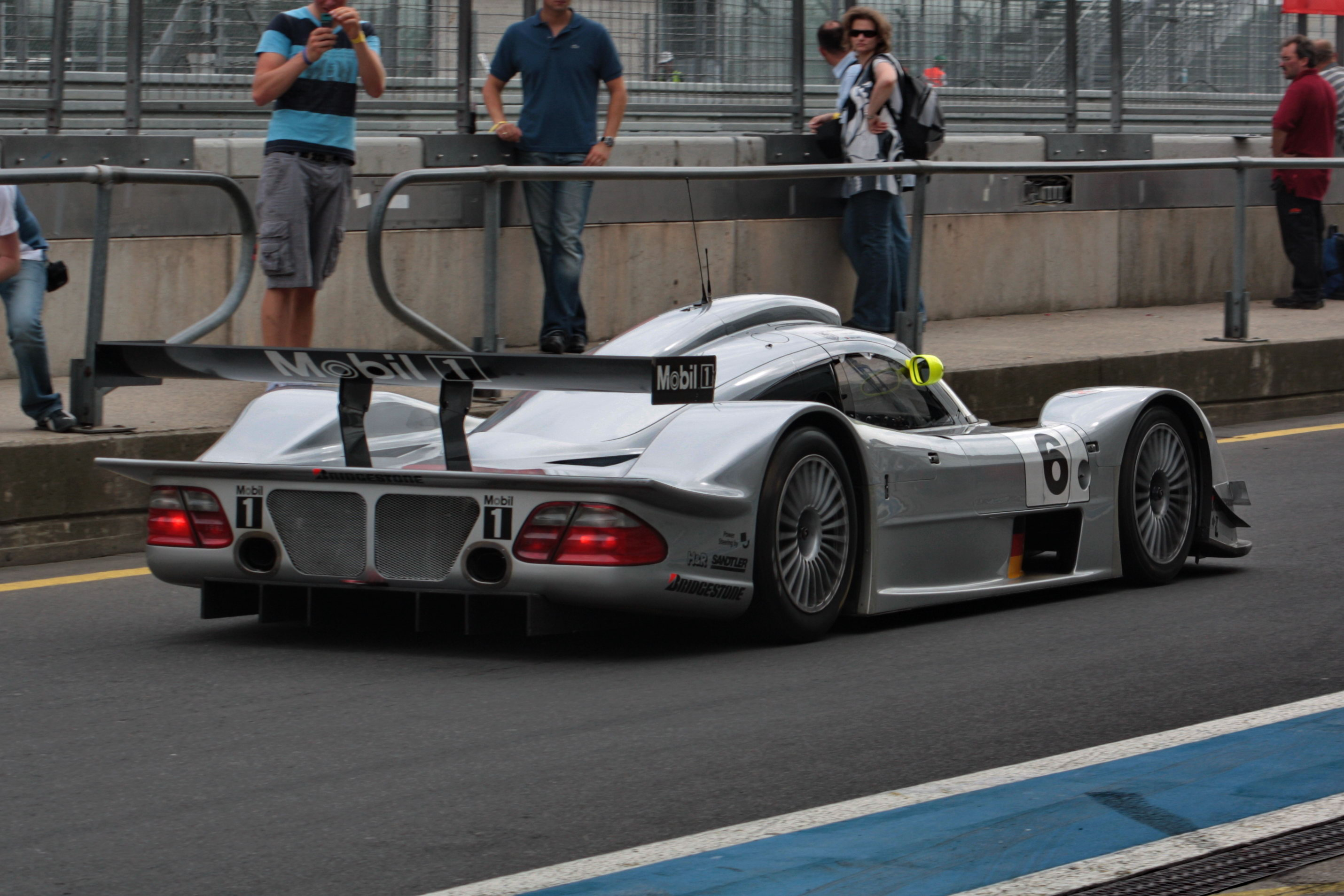
The low profile of the CLR

Work on designing a new car to meet LMGTP regulations began in September 1998 as Mercedes was closing out its second FIA GT Championship season. Development was led by HWA GmbH, the motorsports division of AMG, which became an independent company the following year. The LMGTP rules did not require road versions of the cars to be built, so Gerhard Ungar, chief designer for HWA, was free to develop the CLR without concern for road legality issues or the inclusion of driver comforts. The transition from GT1 to LMGTP also allowed a decrease in the minimum allowed weight, from 950 kg (2,090 lb) to 900 kg (2,000 lb). (Note: Although the LMGTP rules allowed a 900 kg minimum weight, the CLRs were officially measured by the ACO with a weight between 914 kg (2,015 lb) and 925 kg (2,039 lb).) The new design had a much smaller cockpit monocoque made from carbon fiber and aluminium honeycomb. The monocoque derived the design of its lower half from the CLK LM's combination of carbon fibre and steel tube frame, but required a full carbon and aluminium upper half because of new load tests mandatory for LMGTP cockpits. The bodywork of the CLR was also 10 cm (4 in) shorter in overall height compared to the CLK LM, while the nose was substantially lower and flatter than its predecessor due to a shorter wheelbase allowing longer overhangs. Aerodynamic development on the design was carried out at the University of Stuttgart's wind tunnel and assisted by the aerodynamic specialists Fondmetal Technologies. Aerodynamic emphasis was placed on low drag for maximum top speed. Mercedes-Benz's brand image was also retained with the reuse of CLK-Class styled tail lights from the CLK LM and a front fascia, grille and headlamps based on the then-new CL-Class.

The engine for the CLR was also a variant of the design used on the CLK LM. The GT108C 32 valve naturally aspirated V8 engine was loosely based on the M119 engine used in Mercedes-Benz road cars at that time. A previous variant of the M119 had won Le Mans for Mercedes in 1989. Displacement was increased from 5.0 L (310 cu in) to 5.7 L (350 cu in) to compensate for the new air restrictor limitations in the LMGTP category, which allowed the engine to produce approximately 600 bhp (450 kW; 610 PS). The first engine was completed and began testing in December 1998. The Xtrac 6-speed sequential gearbox came directly from the CLK LM, while Bridgestone continued as the team's tyre supplier. The suspension setup from the CLK LM was largely carried over to the CLR, although a central spring was added to the rear suspension.

Mercedes publicly announced its CLR programme in February 1999 just days before the first car began private testing at California Speedway in the United States. Testing continued into March at California as well as Homestead-Miami Speedway in Florida before the team moved to the Circuit de Nevers Magny-Cours in France. At Magny-Cours three CLRs completed a 30-hour test session covering 8,073 mi (12,992 km). On 20 April the CLR was shown to the press for the first time during a test session at the Hockenheimring in Germany. By that point in the development process the CLRs had covered 21,735 mi (34,979 km) in testing without any major failures.

== Preparation ==
The initial schedule for the CLRs consisted of participation in the May pre-qualifying and testing session at Le Mans in preparation for the race in June. At the team's Hockenheim test session plans were announced to enter several races after Le Mans. The first, scheduled for July, was to be an exhibition event consisting of two 60 mi (97 km) races at the Norisring street circuit in Nuremberg, Germany. Mercedes planned to enter four CLRs in the event. The team would then end its season with the final three races of the American Le Mans Series: the 10-hour Petit Le Mans endurance at Road Atlanta and shorter races at Laguna Seca Raceway and Las Vegas Motor Speedway. More than 200 personnel from Mercedes-Benz and HWA formed the crew for the three cars although the team was officially known as AMG-Mercedes.

As part of its launch announcement in February 1999, Mercedes named nine drivers to the team. Retained from the FIA GT programme were Christophe Bouchut, Jean-Marc Gounon, Bernd Schneider, Marcel Tiemann, and Mark Webber. Nick Heidfeld, then a test driver for the McLaren Mercedes Formula One team, was added to the team for his first experience with sports cars. Former Macau Grand Prix winner and All-Japan Formula Three champion Peter Dumbreck also came from an open wheel racing background. Pedro Lamy, 1998 FIA GT2 Champion, was drafted from the Oreca Chrysler team to participate at Le Mans and in the Deutsche Tourewagen Masters for Mercedes, while Franck Lagorce transferred from Nissan's Le Mans squad. Darren Turner, also a test driver for McLaren, served as the team's reserve driver for Le Mans.

== Le Mans ==
=== Practice and qualifying ===
By winning the 1998 FIA GT Championship, Mercedes were awarded a single guaranteed entry for Le Mans, which was assigned to Gounon, Tiemann, and Webber in CLR No. 4. Bouchut, Dumbreck, and Heidfeld in the No. 5 and Lagorce, Lamy, and Schneider in the No. 6 entries would have to pre-qualify for the event, while No. 4 was free to use the pre-qualifying session for testing purposes. Pre-qualifying involved all 62 entry applicant teams setting lap times over a long session. The final entry for Le Mans would be made of 48 cars, combining guaranteed entries and the fastest cars in pre-qualifying within their respective classes; the prototype category, combining LMP and LMGTP cars, only allowed 28 cars from 31 entries. Competitors in the prototype category for 1999 included factory-supported LMGTP programmes from Toyota and Audi, and LMP entries from Nissan, BMW, Audi, and Panoz. Toyota set the fastest pre-qualifying time overall, followed by Panoz and BMW. Mercedes No. 6 was the sixth fastest car, while Nos. 4 and 5 were 14th and 15th respectively. Although the cars succeeded in passing pre-qualifying, one CLR suffered a setback when a suspension linkage was torn from the front of the monocoque. The suspension failure was the first major fault suffered by the CLRs since their testing debut in February.

Several weeks after pre-qualifying, Mercedes' returned for two days of practice and qualifying sessions in the week leading up to the race. The sessions would set the starting grid for the race based on the fastest overall lap time by each car. At the end of the first day, Mercedes' entries were fifth, sixth, and eighth on the provisional grid. Toyota led the session, over four seconds ahead of the fastest Mercedes. Early in the second day of sessions, Webber, driving CLR No. 4, was following the Audi R8R of Frank Biela through the portion of the circuit connecting Mulsanne Corner and the Indianapolis complex when he moved out of the Audi's slipstream to overtake. The CLR suddenly lifted its nose and front wheels off the circuit and became airborne, flipping upwards and somersaulting backwards before rotating onto its side. The car impacted the tarmac with its right side while perpendicular to the circuit then flipped back onto its wheels before skidding 300 m (980 ft) into the safety barriers on the side of the circuit. Webber was extracted from the car by track marshals and taken to a nearby hospital suffering from a sore neck, chest, and back. The accident occurred in an area not generally accessible to the public and was not seen by television cameras.

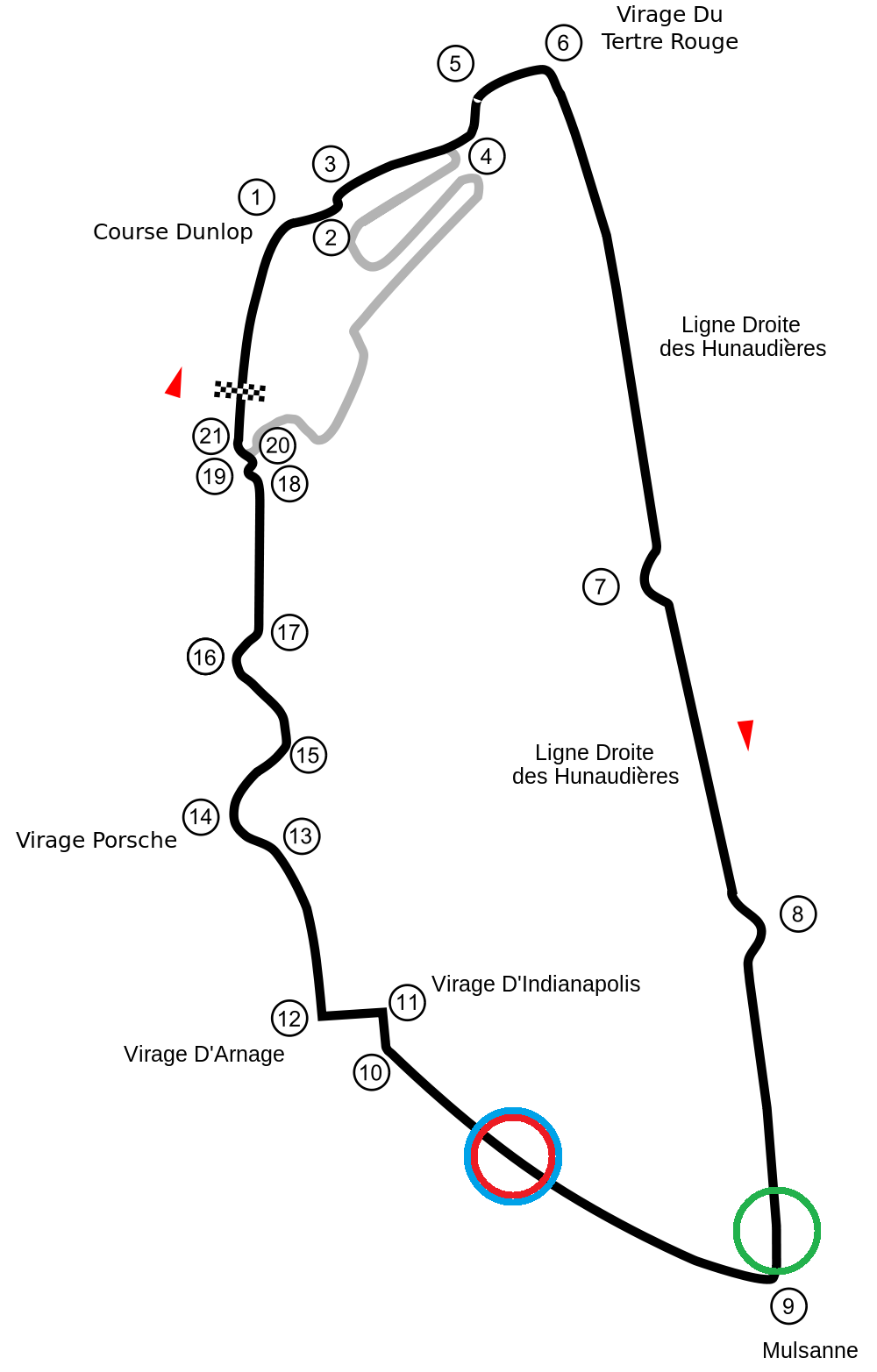
The locations of the CLR accidents on the Circuit de la Sarthe: Red: Webber's qualifying accident Green: Webber's warm-up accident Blue: Dumbreck's race accident

Due to the accident, the No. 4 car was unable to improve its qualifying time from the previous day, which relegated the car to tenth on the starting grid as competitors improved their times; Mercedes No. 5 also did not improve its lap time and finished the session seventh. Bernd Schneider was able to go quicker than his time from the previous day with a 3:31.541 lap for the No. 6 car. Toyota took pole position with a 3:29.930 lap, while Schneider's car was placed fourth on the final starting grid. The wreckage of the CLR No. 4 was returned to Mercedes at the end of the qualifying session and the team issued a press release confirming that they could repair the car before the start of the race two days later. A spare CLR monocoque, taken from a test car, was used to rebuild the No. 4. (Note: There is a discrepancy on whether or not CLR No. 4 used a spare monocoque to be repaired. Spurring states that the monocoque was not damaged and reused on the rebuilt car. Norbert Haug stated in Autosport that the team left Le Mans with one intact CLR and three damaged monocoques.) Webber was able to recover from his injuries by spending the following day in physical training and was cleared on Saturday morning to participate in the race.

=== Warm-up ===
On the morning of the race, a warm-up session lasting half an hour was held as a final preparation for the teams. Mercedes No. 4, repaired after its Thursday accident, joined its two teammates on the circuit as the session began. Webber was once again driving the No. 4 car as the trio made their way down the Mulsanne Straight. Approaching Mulsanne Corner, Webber trailed his two teammates but was approximately 15 m (50 ft) behind a Chrysler Viper GTS-R entered by Team Oreca. Cresting a hill at the approach to the corner, Webber's car lifted its nose into the air once again and rose over 9 m (30 ft) above the track, somersaulting backwards before twisting towards its right and hitting the tarmac with the right rear of the car while inverted, shedding its engine cover, rear wing, and nose. The car skidded on its roof into a run-off area just short of the roundabout next to the Mulsanne Corner before coming to a halt. Marshals were eventually able to right the Mercedes and extract Webber, who sustained no major injuries. Television cameras located at Mulsannes Corner captured the aftermath of the accident and broadcast pictures of the CLR on its roof to the worldwide audience. Photographers in the same location also captured the car as it flipped. The ACO later published these photographs in its 1999 yearbook.

Mercedes immediately withdrew CLR No. 4 from the event as the race was only a few hours from beginning. Norbert Haug, head of Mercedes-Benz's motorsport activities, contacted Adrian Newey, chief aerodynamicist of the McLaren Formula One team, for consultation on modifying the remaining CLRs to prevent further accidents. The drivers were also consulted on whether they believed the cars were too dangerous to race; Bouchut felt that the front of the car could become light at high speeds and voiced his concerns to the team, but other drivers had not felt this issue with the cars. Mercedes opted to make modifications to the front bodywork of the two remaining cars by adding dive planes to the fenders for increased downforce but sacrificing overall top speed. The drivers were also instructed not to follow other cars too closely.

=== Race ===
With only two CLRs remaining, Mercedes started from the fourth and seventh place grid positions. Schneider was able to move into third place behind the two Toyotas in the opening laps while Bouchut progressed to fourth. The Toyotas made pit stops first, followed by Schneider and Bouchut, then the two BMWs. One of the Toyotas eventually suffered transmission issues which dropped it down in the field, leaving the top six positions to be swapped amongst the two remaining Toyotas, two Mercedes, and two BMWs as they made pit stops on different schedules. Driver changes during later pit stops had Lagorce getting in the No. 6 to replace Schneider, while Dumbreck replaced Bouchut in the No. 5. Schneider reported that, despite some initial problems dealing with the car's new aerodynamics, it was running well by the end of his stint.

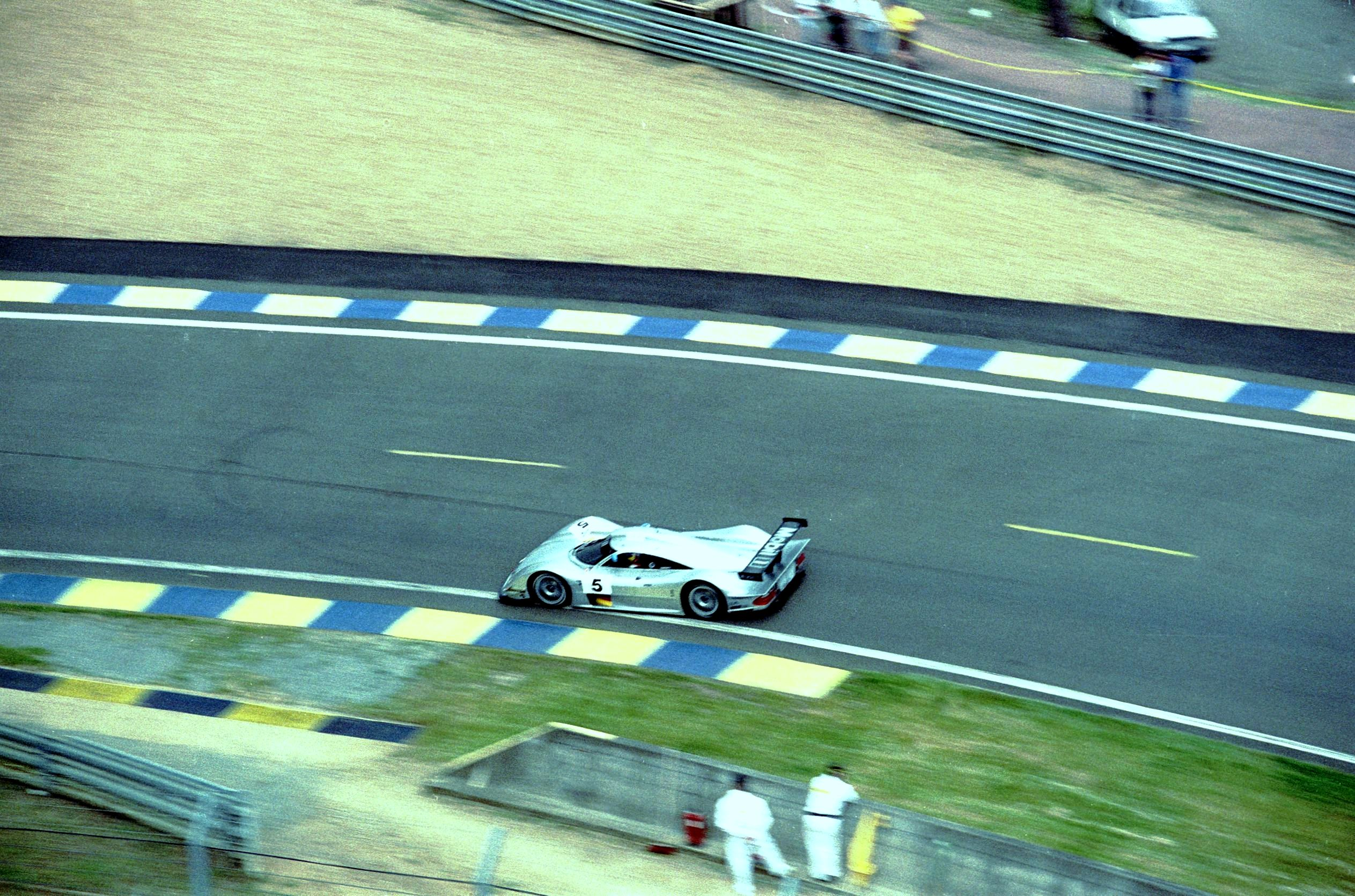
The No. 5 CLR involved in the accident on that day.

Towards the close of the fourth hour of the race, Dumbreck's Mercedes came into contact with the GTS-class Porsche 911 GT2 of the Estoril Racing team at the Ford Chicanes, but continued with no apparent damage. On lap 76 Dumbreck was in third place and catching Thierry Boutsen's Toyota in second place. The Mercedes and Toyota were nose to tail on the run from Mulsannes Corner to Indianapolis at nearly 200 mph (320 km/h) with both drivers partially blinded by the setting sun ahead of them. At a slight right kink in the straight, Dumbreck's CLR ran over the small apex kerbing and suddenly lifted its front wheels from the ground before somersaulting backwards as the entire car became airborne. The Mercedes rotated three times as it flew in the air, reaching a height of nearly 15 m (50 ft). The car continued its trajectory as the circuit curved to the right, clearing a marshaling post and the safety barrier on the left side of the track and missing a large advertising billboard bridging the track just ahead of it. Television cameras broadcasting the live world feed captured the CLR's aerobatics before it went out of view behind trees. The car impacted the ground in an area of woods alongside the circuit that had been cut and cleared only two weeks prior and was inaccessible to spectators. The car dug a rut in the dirt as it continued to tumble in the clearing. The impact forced a tree limb to penetrate the monocoque between the driver's seat and fuel tank. The CLR came to rest right side up and track marshals rushed to the stopped car. Track officials quickly slowed the race with caution flags and safety cars to dispatch recovery vehicles. Dumbreck was knocked unconscious after the initial impact but awoke and climbed from the car where he was found by the marshals and local Gendarmerie officers in the area. Dumbreck was later given a breathalyser test by the officers due to Le Mans' use of public roads before being transported by ambulance to a local hospital for examinations before being released. At the end of the 76th lap Lagorce was ordered by the team to bring the remaining CLR directly to its garage; upon the car's arrival AMG-Mercedes shut the last of its three garage doors signifying its official retirement from the event. National rivals BMW went on to win the race the following day.

== Aftermath ==
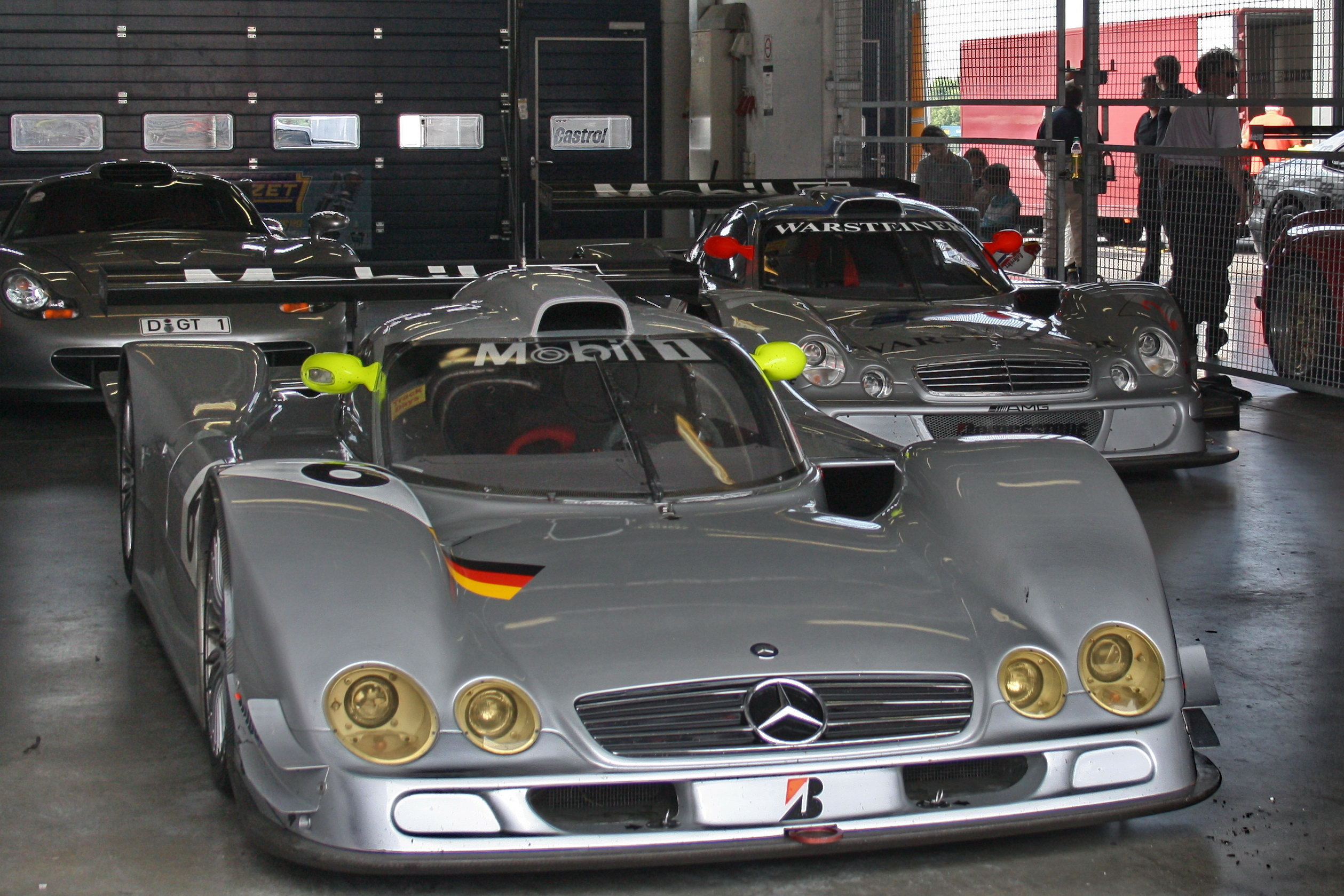
CLR No. 6 appeared at a track day event held at the Nürburgring in 2009. The dive planes added to the car before the start of Le Mans are still on the front fenders.

Following the race the ACO and the Fédération Française du Sport Automobile (FFSA) national motorsport body investigated the incidents. The FFSA questioned the ACO's decision to allow Mercedes to continue to compete after the two accidents prior to the race start, but the ACO argued that there were no indications that the problems that befell CLR No. 4 were shared by the other Mercedes entries. The ACO argued that the design of the CLR, with the longest front and rear overhang amongst the prototype field, was the cause of the problem. Already in 1998, at Road Atlanta in the United States, the Porsche 911 GT1-98 of Yannick Dalmas, similar in design to the CLR, had suffered a nearly identical blow over accident when going over a hump, and at the very same place in 2000, the open cockpit BMW V12 of Bill Auberlen also backflipped. The ACO changed the regulations for the LMGTP category in 2000, decreasing the allowable length of overhang. The FIA also instructed its Advisory Expert Group to develop new regulations to prevent similar airborne accidents in other racing cars. The LMGTP class itself was abandoned by the teams in 2000 as Toyota cancelled its programme and Audi concentrated on open-cockpit LMP cars; the class reappeared in 2001.

Peter Dumbreck, in response to his accident, initially blamed the height of the kerbs he had run on when his car became airborne, but Mercedes-Benz responded by stating that blame did not lie with the circuit. The kerbs, as well as the entire Le Mans circuit, were all approved by the FIA. After the 2000 race the ACO and the French government made modifications to the Route nationale 138 which forms the Mulsanne Straight, by decreasing the height of a hill by 7.9 m (26 ft) on the approach to the Mulsanne Corner where Webber had his warm-up accident.

Before the race had concluded, Mercedes-Benz addressed criticism from other drivers and teams of its decisions. Haug believed that the team's data from Webber's practice incident had been adequately analysed and that the drivers did not feel there were problems with their cars in traffic that could cause the same incidents, prompting his decision to continue. He also stated his belief that contact between CLR No. 5 and the Estoril Porsche may have damaged the front diffuser and led to the aerodynamic instabilities. Shortly after Le Mans, Mercedes conducted its own examination of the accidents by running the remaining CLR on an airfield to verify wind tunnel data. Although no conclusions were published by Mercedes, the company cancelled the rest of its 1999 programme, withdrawing from the Norisring exhibition event and the final three rounds of the American Le Mans Series. The team's change in plans for the Norisring eventually led to the entire event being cancelled over a lack of manufacturer involvement. Mercedes returned to touring car racing from 2000 onwards, and did not participate in the 24 Hours of Le Mans in any capacity between 1999 and 2024. In 2025, with Group GT3 cars being used in the present-day FIA World Endurance Championship's GT class, the Mercedes-Benz name made its return to the Le Mans grid with the Mercedes-AMG GT3 Evo, although only as customer entries.

Despite the failure of the CLR project, Christophe Bouchut felt that the cars were his favorite to drive in a 21-year career at Le Mans, praising the cars' handling and technology. Following the damage to CLRs Nos. 4 and 5 during the Le Mans week, the remaining car has rarely been seen but has begun to make reappearances in recent years. As part of a 2008 celebration for the retirement of Bernd Schneider, CLR No. 6 was publicly displayed in Sankt Ingbert, Germany. The car appeared in the hands of a private owner in 2009 at a Modena Trackdays event held at the Nürburgring and was driven on the circuit. Since 2023, the car is on display at the Nationales Automuseum, a German car museum.

The failures of the CLRs have become lore for Le Mans and motorsport in general. Speed Channel, as part of its tenth anniversary, named its broadcast of Dumbreck's accident as the fourth most memorable moment in the network's history. Road & Track magazine's list of the ten most infamous crashes at Le Mans named Webber's warm-up accident as seventh and Dumbreck's crash as second.

== See also ==
- 1955 Le Mans disaster
- Matra MS640 - unraced sports prototype that suffered a similar accident during Le Mans testing
- Mercedes-Benz CLK GTR
- Mercedes-Benz in motorsport
