= 1998 FIA GT Laguna Seca 500 km =

Layout of the Laguna Seca Raceway

The 1998 Visa Sports Car Championships was the tenth and final round the 1998 FIA GT Championship season. It took place at the Laguna Seca Raceway, California, United States on October 25, 1998.

This race shared the weekend with a Professional SportsCar Racing Championship event.

== Official results ==
Class winners are in bold. Cars failing to complete 70% of winner's distance are marked as Not Classified (NC).

Pos	Class	No	Team	Drivers	Chassis	Tyre	Laps
Pos	Class	No	Team	Drivers	Engine	Tyre	Laps
1	**GT1**	**2**	**(Germany) AMG Mercedes**	**(Germany) Klaus Ludwig (Brazil) Ricardo Zonta**	**Mercedes-Benz CLK LM**	**B**	**139**
1	**GT1**	**2**	**(Germany) AMG Mercedes**	**(Germany) Klaus Ludwig (Brazil) Ricardo Zonta**	**Mercedes-Benz M119 6.0L V8**	**B**	**139**
2	GT1	1	(Germany) AMG Mercedes	(Germany) Bernd Schneider (Australia) Mark Webber	Mercedes-Benz CLK LM	**B**	139
2	GT1	1	(Germany) AMG Mercedes	(Germany) Bernd Schneider (Australia) Mark Webber	Mercedes-Benz M119 6.0L V8	**B**	139
3	GT1	8	(Germany) Porsche AG	(Germany) Jörg Müller (Germany) Uwe Alzen	Porsche 911 GT1-98	**MI**	138
3	GT1	8	(Germany) Porsche AG	(Germany) Jörg Müller (Germany) Uwe Alzen	Porsche 3.2L Turbo Flat-6	**MI**	138
4	GT1	3	(France) DAMS	(France) Éric Bernard (Australia) David Brabham	Panoz GTR-1	**MI**	137
4	GT1	3	(France) DAMS	(France) Éric Bernard (Australia) David Brabham	Ford (Roush) 6.0L V8	**MI**	137
5	GT1	6	(Germany) Zakspeed Racing	(Germany) Michael Bartels (Italy) Max Angelelli	Porsche 911 GT1-98	**P**	138
5	GT1	6	(Germany) Zakspeed Racing	(Germany) Michael Bartels (Italy) Max Angelelli	Porsche 3.2L Turbo Flat-6	**P**	138
6	GT1	11	(Germany) Team Persson Motorsport	(France) Christophe Bouchut (Germany) Bernd Mayländer	Mercedes-Benz CLK GTR	**B**	135
6	GT1	11	(Germany) Team Persson Motorsport	(France) Christophe Bouchut (Germany) Bernd Mayländer	Mercedes-Benz M120 6.0L V12	**B**	135
7	**GT2**	**51**	**(France) Viper Team Oreca**	**(Monaco) Olivier Beretta (Portugal) Pedro Lamy**	**Chrysler Viper GTS-R**	**MI**	**127**
7	**GT2**	**51**	**(France) Viper Team Oreca**	**(Monaco) Olivier Beretta (Portugal) Pedro Lamy**	**Chrysler 8.0L V10**	**MI**	**127**
8	GT2	57	(Germany) Roock Racing	(Switzerland) Bruno Eichmann (Netherlands) Mike Hezemans	Porsche 911 GT2	**Y**	126
8	GT2	57	(Germany) Roock Racing	(Switzerland) Bruno Eichmann (Netherlands) Mike Hezemans	Porsche 3.6L Turbo Flat-6	**Y**	126
9	GT2	63	(Germany) Krauss Race Sports International	(Germany) Michael Trunk (Germany) Bernhard Müller	Porsche 911 GT2	**D**	123
9	GT2	63	(Germany) Krauss Race Sports International	(Germany) Michael Trunk (Germany) Bernhard Müller	Porsche 3.6L Turbo Flat-6	**D**	123
10	GT2	58	(Germany) Roock Sportsystem	(Germany) André Ahrlé (United Kingdom) Robert Schirle (United States) Dirk Layer	Porsche 911 GT2	**Y**	122
10	GT2	58	(Germany) Roock Sportsystem	(Germany) André Ahrlé (United Kingdom) Robert Schirle (United States) Dirk Layer	Porsche 3.6L Turbo Flat-6	**Y**	122
11	GT1	12	(Germany) Team Persson Motorsport	(France) Jean-Marc Gounon (Germany) Marcel Tiemann	Mercedes-Benz CLK GTR	**B**	121
11	GT1	12	(Germany) Team Persson Motorsport	(France) Jean-Marc Gounon (Germany) Marcel Tiemann	Mercedes-Benz M120 6.0L V12	**B**	121
12	GT2	60	(Switzerland) Elf Haberthur Racing	(Belgium) Michel Neugarten (Germany) Gerd Ruch (United States) Zak Brown	Porsche 911 GT2	**G**	118
12	GT2	60	(Switzerland) Elf Haberthur Racing	(Belgium) Michel Neugarten (Germany) Gerd Ruch (United States) Zak Brown	Porsche 3.6L Turbo Flat-6	**G**	118
13	GT2	80	(United Kingdom) GP Motorsport	(United Kingdom) Daniel Dor (United States) John Young (United States) Peter Gregg	Saleen Mustang SR	?	118
13	GT2	80	(United Kingdom) GP Motorsport	(United Kingdom) Daniel Dor (United States) John Young (United States) Peter Gregg	Ford 5.9L V8	?	118
14	GT2	69	(Germany) Proton Competition	(Germany) Gerold Ried (France) Patrick Vuillaume	Porsche 911 GT2	**P**	65
14	GT2	69	(Germany) Proton Competition	(Germany) Gerold Ried (France) Patrick Vuillaume	Porsche 3.6L Turbo Flat-6	**P**	65
15	GT2	53	(United Kingdom) Chamberlain Engineering	(Portugal) Ni Amorim (United States) Spencer Trenery (Netherlands) Hans Hugenholtz	Chrysler Viper GTS-R	**D**	117
15	GT2	53	(United Kingdom) Chamberlain Engineering	(Portugal) Ni Amorim (United States) Spencer Trenery (Netherlands) Hans Hugenholtz	Chrysler 8.0L V10	**D**	117
16	GT2	87	(Germany) Seikel Motorsport	(Canada) Tony Burgess (Germany) Gerhard Marchner (Austria) Manfred Jurasz	Porsche 911 GT2	**P**	113
16	GT2	87	(Germany) Seikel Motorsport	(Canada) Tony Burgess (Germany) Gerhard Marchner (Austria) Manfred Jurasz	Porsche 3.6L Turbo Flat-6	**P**	113
17	GT2	65	(Germany) Konrad Motorsport	(United Kingdom) Martin Stretton (Switzerland) Toni Seiler	Porsche 911 GT2	**D**	105
17	GT2	65	(Germany) Konrad Motorsport	(United Kingdom) Martin Stretton (Switzerland) Toni Seiler	Porsche 3.6L Turbo Flat-6	**D**	105
18 DNF	GT2	81	(Germany) Freisinger Motorsport	(Germany) Wolfgang Kaufmann (France) Michel Ligonnet	Porsche 911 GT2	?	84
18 DNF	GT2	81	(Germany) Freisinger Motorsport	(Germany) Wolfgang Kaufmann (France) Michel Ligonnet	Porsche 3.6L Turbo Flat-6	?	84
19 DNF	GT2	61	(Switzerland) Elf Haberthur Racing	(Belgium) Bruno Lambert (United States) Mike Conte	Porsche 911 GT2	**G**	76
19 DNF	GT2	61	(Switzerland) Elf Haberthur Racing	(Belgium) Bruno Lambert (United States) Mike Conte	Porsche 3.6L Turbo Flat-6	**G**	76
20 DNF	GT2	76	(Germany) Seikel Motorsport	(United Kingdom) Nigel Smith (New Zealand) Andrew Bagnall (Morocco) Max Cohen-Olivar	Porsche 911 GT2	**P**	62
20 DNF	GT2	76	(Germany) Seikel Motorsport	(United Kingdom) Nigel Smith (New Zealand) Andrew Bagnall (Morocco) Max Cohen-Olivar	Porsche 3.6L Turbo Flat-6	**P**	62
21 DNF	GT1	7	(Germany) Porsche AG	(France) Yannick Dalmas (United Kingdom) Allan McNish	Porsche 911 GT1-98	**MI**	44
21 DNF	GT1	7	(Germany) Porsche AG	(France) Yannick Dalmas (United Kingdom) Allan McNish	Porsche 3.2L Turbo Flat-6	**MI**	44
22 DNF	GT2	71	(Netherlands) Marcos Racing International	(Netherlands) Herman Buurman (South Africa) Manno Schaafsma	Marcos LM600	**D**	33
22 DNF	GT2	71	(Netherlands) Marcos Racing International	(Netherlands) Herman Buurman (South Africa) Manno Schaafsma	Chevrolet 5.9L V8	**D**	33
23 DNF	GT2	70	(Netherlands) Marcos Racing International	(United Kingdom) Christian Vann (Germany) Harald Becker (Netherlands) Cor Euser	Marcos LM600	**D**	21
23 DNF	GT2	70	(Netherlands) Marcos Racing International	(United Kingdom) Christian Vann (Germany) Harald Becker (Netherlands) Cor Euser	Chevrolet 5.9L V8	**D**	21
24 DNF	GT2	62	(Switzerland) Stadler Motorsport	(Italy) Renato Mastropietro (Switzerland) Uwe Sick (United States) William Langhorne	Porsche 911 GT2	**P**	19
24 DNF	GT2	62	(Switzerland) Stadler Motorsport	(Italy) Renato Mastropietro (Switzerland) Uwe Sick (United States) William Langhorne	Porsche 3.6L Turbo Flat-6	**P**	19
25 DNF	GT2	86	(France) Larbre Compétition	(France) Jean-Luc Chéreau (France) Jack Leconte	Porsche 911 GT2	**MI**	15
25 DNF	GT2	86	(France) Larbre Compétition	(France) Jean-Luc Chéreau (France) Jack Leconte	Porsche 3.6L Turbo Flat-6	**MI**	15
26 DNF	GT2	56	(Germany) Roock Racing	(Germany) Claudia Hürtgen (France) Stéphane Ortelli	Porsche 911 GT2	**Y**	7
26 DNF	GT2	56	(Germany) Roock Racing	(Germany) Claudia Hürtgen (France) Stéphane Ortelli	Porsche 3.6L Turbo Flat-6	**Y**	7
27 DNF	GT2	66	(Germany) Konrad Motorsport	(Netherlands) Jan Lammers (Austria) Franz Konrad	Porsche 911 GT2	**D**	7
27 DNF	GT2	66	(Germany) Konrad Motorsport	(Netherlands) Jan Lammers (Austria) Franz Konrad	Porsche 3.6L Turbo Flat-6	**D**	7
DNS	GT2	52	(France) Viper Team Oreca	(Austria) Karl Wendlinger (United States) David Donohue	Chrysler Viper GTS-R	**MI**	–
DNS	GT2	52	(France) Viper Team Oreca	(Austria) Karl Wendlinger (United States) David Donohue	Chrysler 8.0L V10	**MI**	–
DNS	GT2	55	(United States) Saleen-Allen Speedlab	(United Kingdom) Andy Pilgrim (United States) Ron Johnson (United States) Terry Borcheller	Saleen Mustang SR	?	–
DNS	GT2	55	(United States) Saleen-Allen Speedlab	(United Kingdom) Andy Pilgrim (United States) Ron Johnson (United States) Terry Borcheller	Ford 5.9L V8	?	–

== Statistics ==
- Pole position – #2 AMG Mercedes – 1:16.154
- Fastest lap – #2 AMG Mercedes – 1:19.094
- Average speed – 158.815 km/h

FIA GT Championship
Previous race: 1998 FIA GT Homestead 500km	1998 season	Next race: None
