= Mercedes-Benz CLK LM =

Sports car built by Mercedes-AMG

Mercedes-Benz CLK-LM
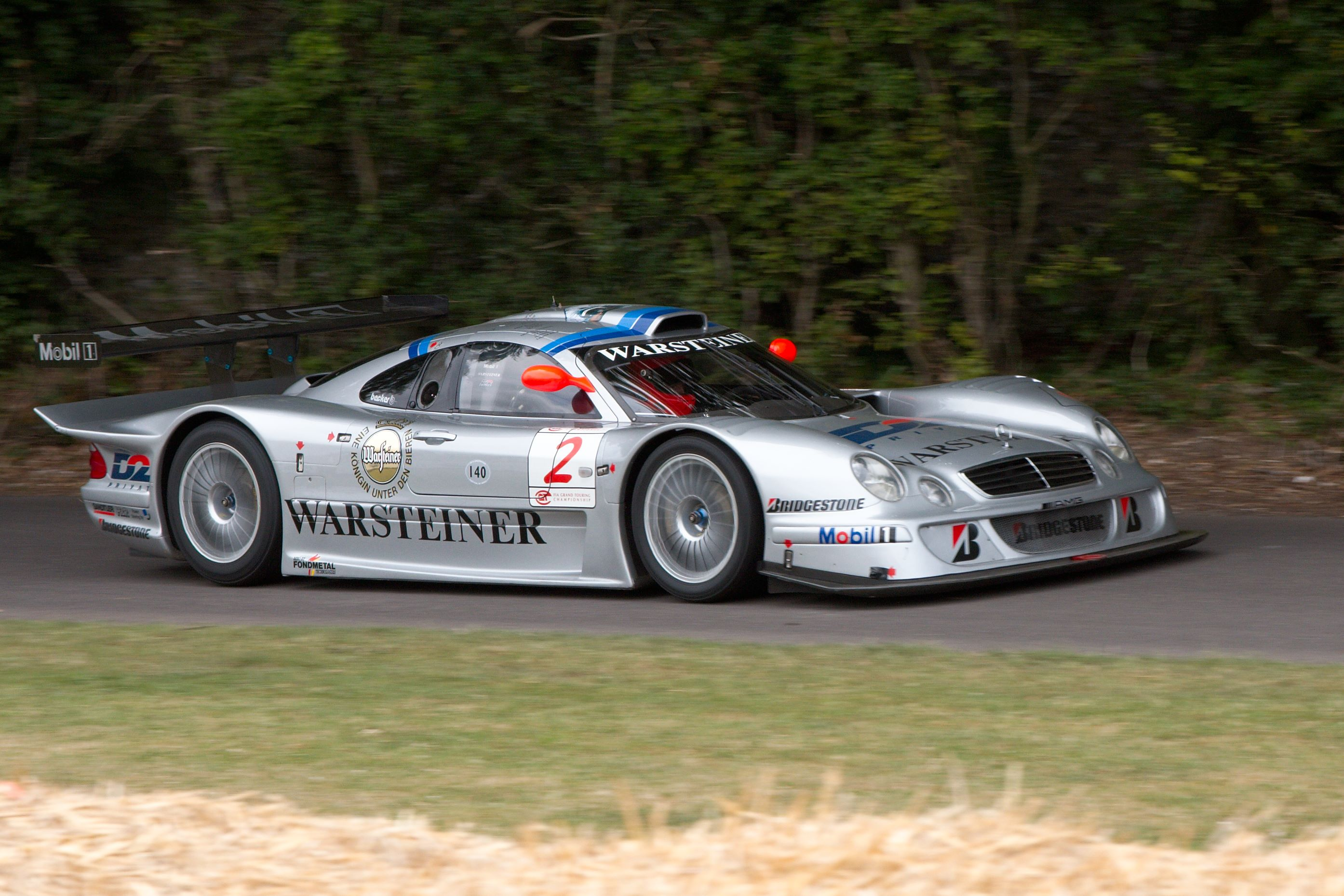
- The No. 2 CLK LM at the 2010 Goodwood Festival of Speed
- Category: GT1
- Constructor: Mercedes-AMG
- Designer: Gerhard Ungar
- Predecessor: Mercedes-Benz CLK GTR
- Successor: Mercedes-Benz CLR; Mercedes-AMG ONE (Straßenversion)

Technical specifications
- Chassis: Carbon-fibre monocoque
- Suspension: Double wishbone suspension with pull-rod actuated coil springs over dampers
- Length: 4,900 mm (192.9 in)
- Width: 1,999 mm (78.7 in)
- Height: 1,112 mm (43.8 in)
- Wheelbase: 2,670 mm (105.1 in)
- Engine: Mercedes-Benz GT108B 4,986 cc (304.3 cu in) V8 naturally aspirated, mid engined
- Transmission: 6-speed sequential
- Power: 600 PS (441 kW; 592 hp)
- Weight: 940 kg (2,072 lb)
- Fuel: Mobil
- Lubricants: Mobil 1
- Brakes: AP Racing ventilated steel calipers
- Tyres: Bridgestone

Competition history
- Competition: FIA GT Championship
- Notable entrants: Mercedes-AMG
- Notable drivers: List of drivers: (Germany) Klaus Ludwig; (Germany) Bernd Schneider; (Brazil) Ricardo Zonta; (Australia) Mark Webber; (France) Christophe Bouchut; (France) Jean-Marc Gounon
- Debut: 1998 FIA GT Hockenheim 500 km
- First win: 1998 FIA GT Hockenheim 500 km
- Last win: 1998 FIA GT Laguna Seca 500 km
- Last event: 1998 FIA GT Laguna Seca 500 km
Races	Wins	Poles	F/Laps
9	8	9	8
- Constructors' Championships: 1 (1998 FIA GT)
- Drivers' Championships: 1 (1998 FIA GT)

The Mercedes-Benz CLK LM (chassis code C298) was a Group GT1 sports car designed and built by Mercedes-Benz in partnership with AMG to compete in the FIA GT Championship. It won every single race in the 1998 FIA GT season, while retiring at the 1998 24 Hours of Le Mans, which was a non-championship event.

At the end of 1998, the FIA GT Championship removed the GT1 class due to the lack of entrants and rising costs, which meant that Mercedes' GT1 program was brought to a close. Mercedes instead focussed their efforts on the newly introduced LMGTP class for the 1999 season, which produced the Mercedes-Benz CLR.

To satisfy the requirements of competing in the FIA GT Championship, a road-legal version had to be built to homologate the car. That car was known as the Mercedes-Benz CLK LM Straßenversion. The company assembled two units, one of which was destroyed for crash-testing.

== Background ==
Mercedes was left without a major international touring or sports car series after the 1996 International Touring Car Championship and Deutsche Tourenwagen Meisterschaft folded in 1996, with their competitors Opel and Alfa Romeo pulling out of the series, leaving Mercedes as the sole entrant. The BPR Global GT Series was elevated to an FIA-sanctioned event, the FIA GT Championship, This piqued the interest of Mercedes, who instructed AMG to construct a car to the Group GT1 regulations.

To speed up the development process, AMG purchased McLaren F1 GTR chassis #11R from French privateers Larbre Compétition, which was then fitted with AMG's own bodywork along with substituting the F1 GTR's S70/2 engine for Mercedes' own, the LS600. This accelerated development process meant that the CLK GTR was ready for competition just 128 days after work on the design had begun.

The CLK GTR debuted at Mercedes' home track, the Hockenheimring, where Bernd Schneider qualified on pole. However, he later retired with brake problems, and the sister car finished 27th. Despite the setback, the CLK GTR would prove to be successful in the 1997 FIA GT Championship, winning six out of eleven races, the constructor's and the driver's championship by a large margin.

Following the success of the CLK GTR, Mercedes-Benz modified the CLK GTR to suit the long straights of the Circuit de la Sarthe, constructing a new chassis with revised bodywork. AMG also had doubts over the reliability of the V12 engine of the CLK GTR, opting to replace it with a non-turbocharged version of the M119 engine found in the Sauber C9 and Mercedes-Benz C11, dubbed the GT 108B. The engine featured a revised crankshaft, with the GT 108B replacing the previous crossplane crank of the V12 with a flat-plane crank. Changes to the bodywork included removing the two front brake cooling ducts, the removal of the front fender gills, alterations to the roof scoop, and a lower roofline and nose.

The CLK GTR would race the first two rounds of the 1998 FIA GT Championship, where it won the championship's first two races at Silverstone and Oschersleben before being replaced by the CLK LM.

== Racing history ==
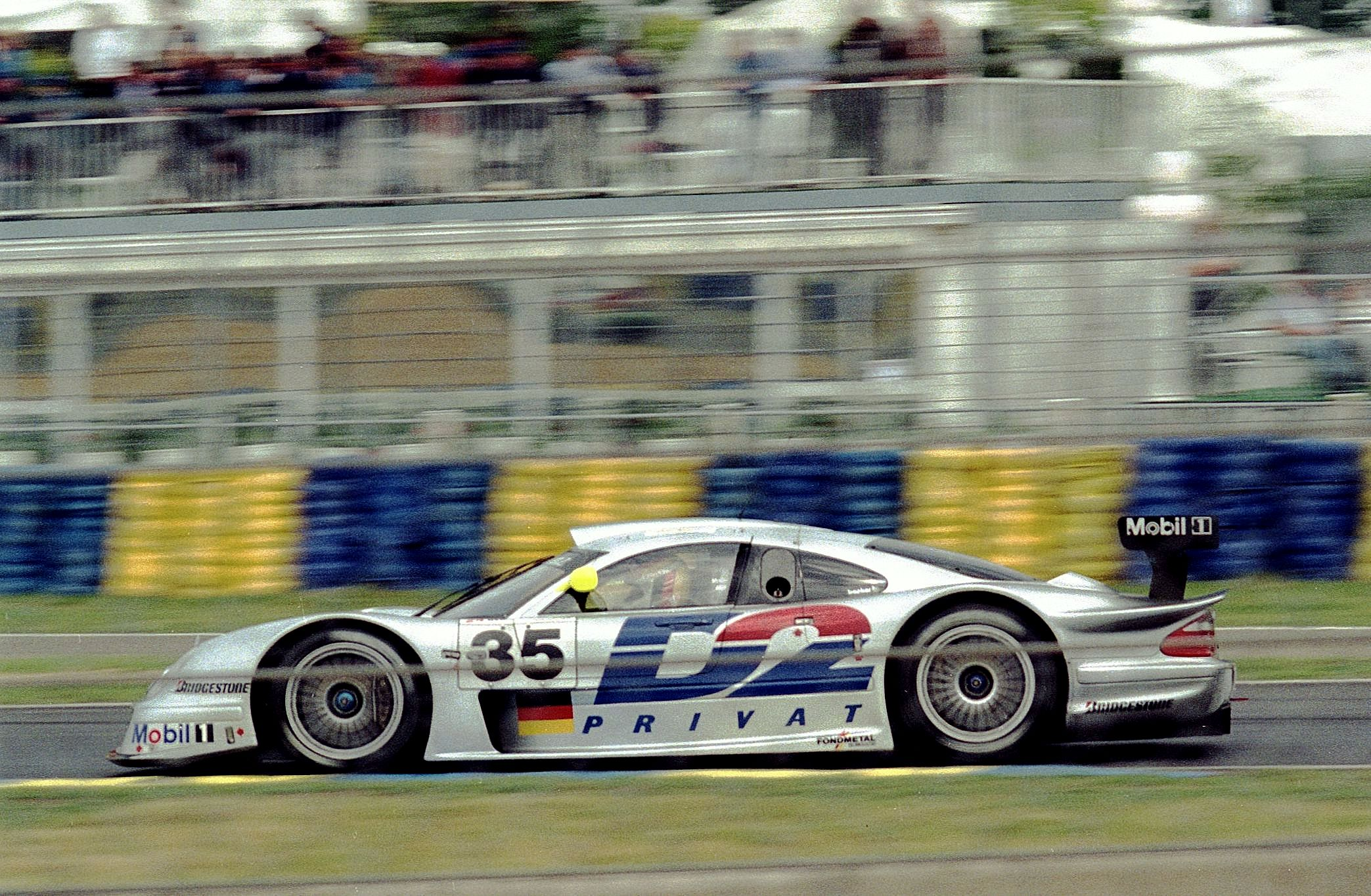
The No. 35 CLK LM at the 1998 24 Hours of Le Mans

At the 1998 24 Hours of Le Mans, Bernd Schneider qualified the No. 35 CLK LM on pole in the third of four qualifying sessions, setting a time of 3:35.544, just over a second ahead of the works Toyota GT-One. The sister No. 36 CLK LM would round out the top three. The engine ultimately proved to be Mercedes' Achilles' heel, with both cars retiring before the halfway mark. Problems with the power steering oil pump caused the CLK LM's entire lubrication system to fail, with Schneider pulling over on the pit straight on the 19th lap, and Gounon pitting a few laps later with the same problem.

In spite of the disappointing results, Mercedes was pleased with the pace of the CLK LM, fielding the car for the rest of the 1998 FIA GT Championship. The two cars shared pole position between them throughout the season, and won every single race, posting six 1–2 finishes. Klaus Ludwig and Ricardo Zonta captured the drivers title at the conclusion of the 1998 season, along with Mercedes-AMG collecting the constructors. Five chassis were constructed in total, with three racing chassis, and two road-legal chassis, one of which was destroyed for crash testing purposes. The termination of the FIA GT Championship meant that the requirement for 25 road-legal chassis to be produced was no longer in effect, leaving the sole road-legal version produced prior to the 1998 24 Hours of Le Mans the only one in existence. Later on, the spare test car (chassis No. 005) was converted for road-legal use in the United Kingdom. The road-legal conversion retained much of the race car's characteristics such as the large rear wing, with the interior being very spartan; it lacked furnishings such as upholstery or a second seat.

== Legacy ==
The rising costs and Mercedes' use of homologation specials caused Porsche and McLaren to withdraw from the 1999 FIA GT Championship, and seeing as Mercedes was the only entrant, the FIA opted to run the 1999 season without the GT1 class. The repetition of what happened in 1996 with the DTM and ITC forced Mercedes to turn their attention to the newly introduced Le Mans Grand Touring Prototype class, where homologation was not an issue. Japanese Internet service provider MTCI planned on campaigning the CLK LM in the Japanese Grand Touring Car Championship, however, negotiations to purchase the CLK LM fell through, with MTCI eventually fielding a custom Porsche Boxster.

The LM's successor, the Mercedes-Benz CLR, inherited many features from the CLK LM; the V8 was enlarged to 5.7 L (347.8 cu in), rechristened the GT 108C, and the roofline was lowered by 10 mm (0.4 in), among other changes. The CLR, despite being a purpose-built Le Mans racecar, turned out to be beset by severe aerodynamic flaws that resulted in its infamous somersaults at the 1999 24 Hours of Le Mans. Following the incidents, Mercedes withdrew from all sportscar activities in 1999 and never entered Le Mans again, with exception of customer Mercedes-AMG GT3 Evo entries in the FIA WEC's LMGT3 class starting in 2025.

== Straßenversion ==
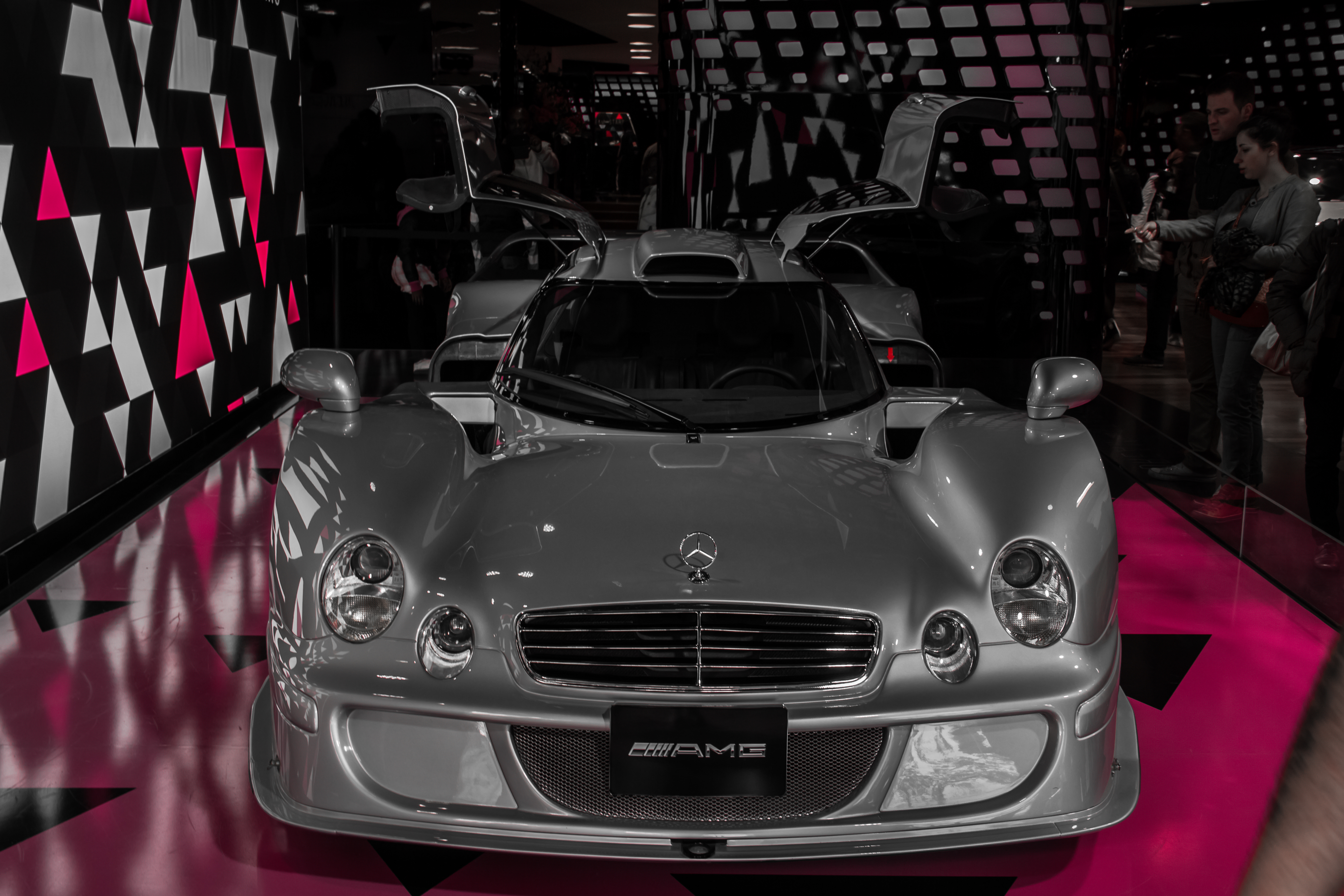
The Straßenversion on display at the Champs-Élysées

The CLK LM Straßenversion or Strassenversion (German for "Street version") is the road-legal homologated version of the CLK LM. Mercedes manufactured two chassis, No. 001 and No. 002, the former of which was destroyed for crash testing purposes.

Modifications for road use included the installation of a tubular steel rollcage, the installation of a plastic front bumper similar to the one found on the CLK GTR Straßenversion, and a rear aerofoil that had a low- and high-downforce configuration. The road car's rear wing was also modified from the lightweight bare-bones racing wing to a wide, swooping rear wing akin to the one found on the Mercedes-Benz CLK GTR Straßenversion.

The car was presented at the 1998 24 Hours of Le Mans alongside the CLK LM racecars, after which it was sold to a Japanese collector. The sole chassis has since made sparse appearances, resurfacing at the 2014 Rétromobile alongside two Mercedes-Benz 300 SL on display by French auction house Classic Sport Leicht, where it was purchased by a European owner. In 2014 it was put on display in the Mercedes-Benz showroom on the Champs-Élysées in Paris as part of the "Dream Paris Stars" exhibition, alongside other rare Mercedes vehicles. The car would also make an appearance at the 2015 Chantilly Arts and Elegance Richard Mille, which Mercedes-Benz was sponsoring. In 2016, the car was put up for sale through the Mercedes-Benz Museum's trading arm, All Time Stars, where it sold for €2 million.

== Racing results ==
=== Complete FIA GT Championship results ===
Year	Entrant	Class	Drivers	No.	Rds.	Rounds										Pts.	Pos.
Year	Entrant	Class	Drivers	No.	Rds.	1	2	3	4	5	6	7	8	9	10	Pts.	Pos.
1998	(Germany) Team AMG-Mercedes	GT1	(Germany) Bernd Schneider (Australia) Mark Webber	1	All; All			**HOC**; 1	**DIJ**; 9*	**HUN**; 1	**SUZ**; 1	DON; 1	A1R; 2	HOM; 4	LAG; 2	146	1st
1998	(Germany) Team AMG-Mercedes	GT1	(Germany) Klaus Ludwig (Brazil) Ricardo Zonta	2	All; All			HOC; 2	DIJ; 1	HUN; 2	SUZ; 2	**DON**; 2	**A1R**; 1	**HOM**; 1	**LAG**; 1	146	1st

* Despite retiring, they had completed over 75% of the race distance, and were thus classified.

=== Complete 24 Hours of Le Mans results ===
Year	Team	Class	No.	Drivers	Position
1998	(Germany) Team AMG-Mercedes	GT1	35	(Germany) Bernd Schneider (Australia) Mark Webber (Germany) Klaus Ludwig	Ret
1998	(Germany) Team AMG-Mercedes	GT1	36	(France) Jean-Marc Gounon (Brazil) Ricardo Zonta (France) Christophe Bouchut	Ret

Colour	Result
Gold	Winner
Silver	Second place
Bronze	Third place
Green	Points classification
Blue	Non-points classification
Blue	Non-classified finish (NC)
Purple	Retired, not classified (Ret)
Red	Did not qualify (DNQ)
Red	Did not pre-qualify (DNPQ)
Black	Disqualified (DSQ)
White	Did not start (DNS)
White	Withdrew (WD)
White	Race cancelled (C)
Blank	Did not practice (DNP)
Blank	Did not arrive (DNA)
Blank	Excluded (EX)

**Bold** – Pole position
Italics – Fastest lap

== See also ==
- Mercedes-Benz in motorsport
