= Panoz Esperante GTR-1 =

Endurance race car

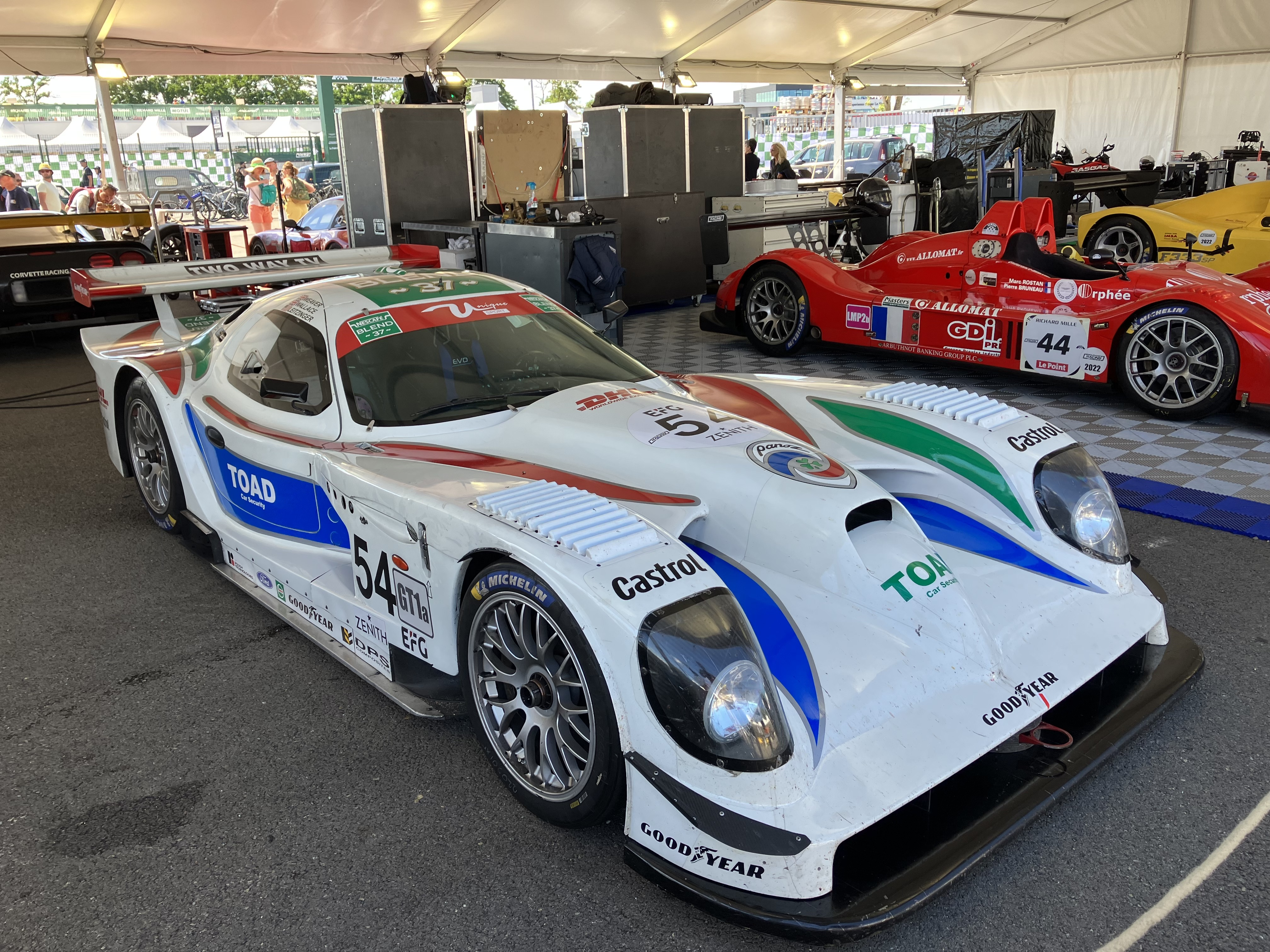
- Panoz Esperante GTR-1 in the paddock of the 2022 Le Mans Classic
- Category: GT1; LMP1 (modified)
- Constructor: Panoz Auto Development and Reynard Motorsport
- Designer: Nigel Stroud

Technical specifications
- Engine: Roush Racing Ford, 6,000 cc (366.1 cu in), V8, NA, front mid-engine Élan 6L8, 6,000 cc (366.1 cu in), V8, NA, front mid-engine (Larbre Compétition)
- Tyres: Goodyear (1997); Michelin

Competition history
- Notable entrants: (United States) Panoz Motorsports (United Kingdom) David Price Racing (France) DAMS (France) Larbre Compétition
- Notable drivers: (Australia) David Brabham (United Kingdom) Andy Wallace (France) Eric Bernard (Brazil) Raul Boesel (United States) Johnny O'Connell
- Debut: 1997 12 Hours of Sebring
- Teams' Championships: 2 (1998 IMSA GT Championship, 1998 United States Road Racing Championship)
- Drivers' Championships: 1 (1998 IMSA GT Championship)

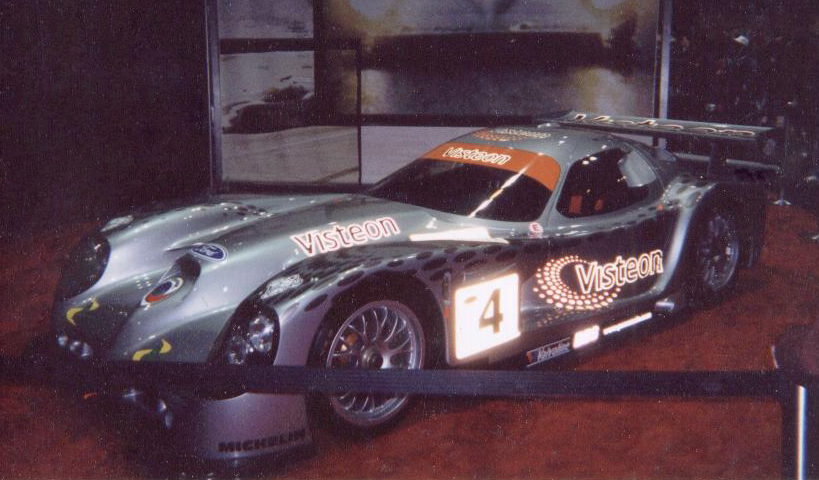
An Esperante GTR-1 on display.

The Panoz Esperante GTR-1 (also known as Panoz GTR-1 and later the Panoz GTP) was a race car developed by Panoz Auto Development and Reynard Motorsport for grand tourer endurance racing in 1997. Although named after the Panoz Esperante roadster, the GTR-1 actually bore no mechanical relation to the production Esperante, instead sharing only minor styling points. Only two road-legal GTR-1s were built to meet homologation requirements set forth by the ruling bodies which the racing cars ran under.

The GTR-1 competed in the FIA GT Championship and 24 Hours of Le Mans in Europe as well as the IMSA GT, United States Road Racing Championship, and American Le Mans Series in North America.

== Development ==
From 1996, Reynard Motorsports' special vehicles division began working with Panoz to develop a grand tourer style racing car meant for the upcoming FIA GT Championship in 1997. Don Panoz, wanting to keep an American-style of design, insisted that the car be based on his Esperante sports car in some way. Due to this, the Esperante GTR-1 became unique in comparison to its Mercedes-Benz, Lotus, Porsche, and McLaren counterparts in that, like the production Esperante, the engine was located in front of the cockpit. Although locating the engine behind the front axle gave the car a balanced mid-engine layout, having the engine in front gave the car unusual proportions, including a large nose and a cockpit placed as far back in the body. The unusual look, including a large bulging intake in the center of the nose, earned the car the nickname "Batmobile" due to its resemblance to the car used by the comic book hero. Following the initial 1997 season, the bodywork was modified in 1998 by lengthening the front and rear bodywork for increased downforce and handling capabilities.

For the engine, Panoz attempted to keep the American theme by using a Ford V8 engine similar to the one used in his Esperante. Instead of the standard 32-valve DOHC 4.6L V8, Panoz turned to Roush Racing of NASCAR to construct a 6.0L V8 based on the Ford engine. Panoz's Élan Power Products would maintain the V8 engines and continue their development.

In order to meet homologation requirements wherein race cars had to be based on road legal production cars, Panoz built a single GTR-1 which featured full interiors and minor modifications to make it able to be legally registered. This car has been retained by Don Panoz. It now features a slightly smaller 5.3L V8 instead of the full 6.0L V8 race engine, since rules allowed engine sizes to be modified in the racing cars.

=== Q9 Hybrid "Sparky" ===
For 1998, in a time when the first proper battery electric cars like the General Motors EV1 were on streets in California along with the first Toyota Prius Hybrids, and about a decade before Formula one and Le Mans racing started considering Hybrids, Panoz reached an agreement with English firm Zytek to develop a hybrid electric motor for the Esperante GTR-1. The Q9 GTR-1 Hybrid, nicknamed "Sparky", was constructed by Panoz, Reynard, and Zytek and developed by David Price Racing for the 1998 season. In honor of its electric power, the car received a unique purple paint job with large yellow lightning bolts.

The idea was that the car would be able to gain better fuel mileage by using an electric motor that would help drive the rear wheels during acceleration, thus requiring less power from the gasoline engine and consuming less fuel. The car would of course require a set of batteries to power the electric motor. To recharge the batteries, a regenerative braking system would be used, the same electric motor now being used to generate electricity. This would reduce the wastage of energy normally emitted as heat from the brakes. By using less fuel, the car would thus be able to make fewer pit stops in endurance races, such as the 24 Hours of Le Mans, and thus would be able to spend more time on the track and achieve a farther distance.

Zytek's oil-cooled, permanent magnet, Brushless DC electric motor/generator was powered by a VARTA 300-volt, 260-cell nickel metal hydride (NiMH) battery pack. It provided on demand 30 percent or 195 hp of the approximately 650 horsepower produced by the hybrid power unit.

The battery—composed of a series of cells—is from Germany's Varta Co. and weighs only 220 pounds; the Zytec motor, another 35. Pretty light for a unit that produces 150 hp.

== Racing results ==
=== 1997 ===
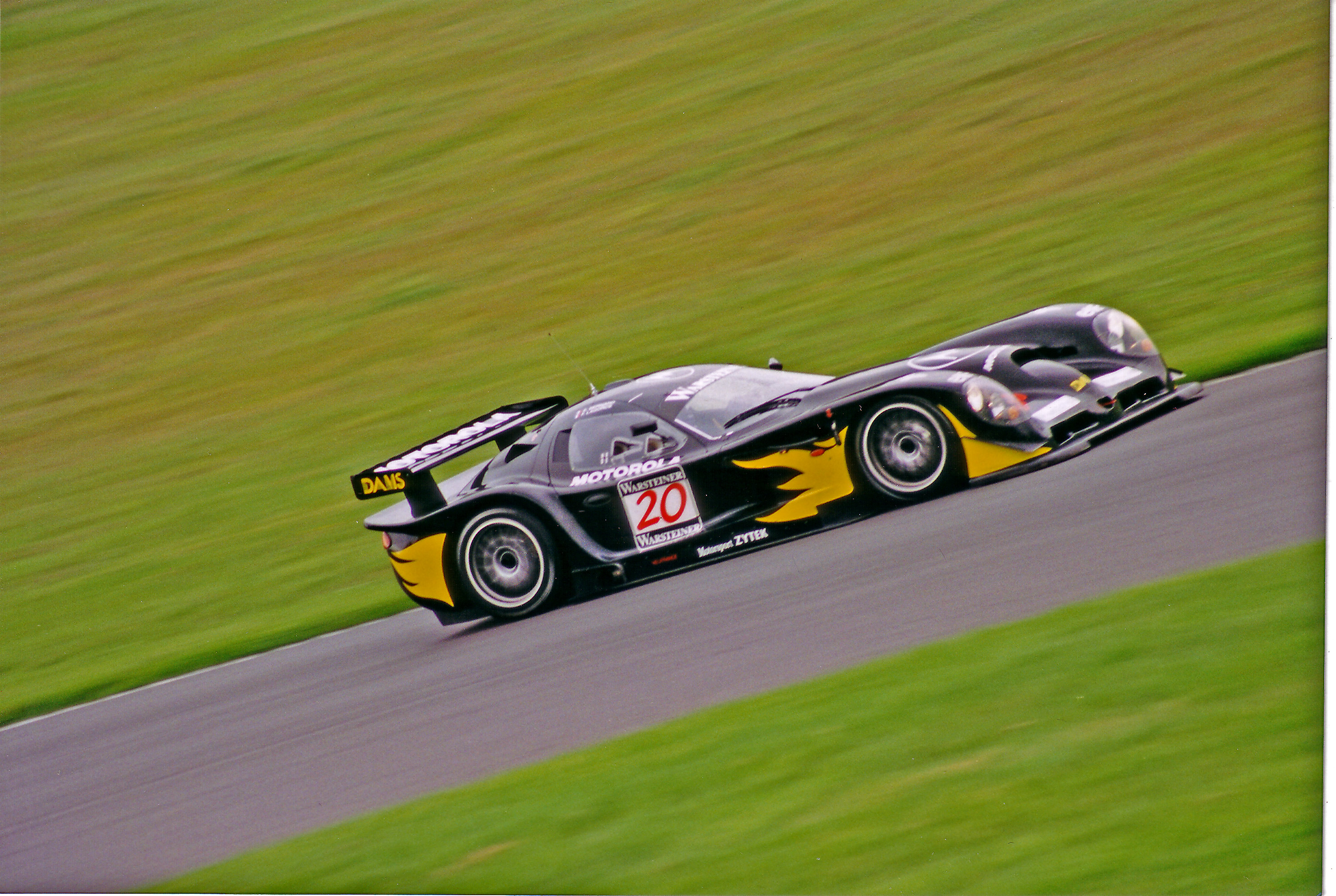
DAMS' Panoz in the FIA GT Championship

A total of six Esperante GTR-1s were built by Panoz, Ford and Reynard, with them being split amongst three teams. Panoz would retain two cars for their own factory effort in the United States. French squad DAMS would use two in Europe along with British team David Price Racing who received the final two cars. The cars debuted at the 1997 12 Hours of Sebring, but failed to finish after 108 laps. Meanwhile, David Price's first Esperante GTR-1 would debut at Hockenheimring for the FIA GT Championship, and managed to finish 11th overall behind the McLaren and Porsche competitors. DAMS' car debuted a round later at Silverstone Circuit, although it failed to finish.

As the three teams continued, Panoz's factory team took the first success at Road Atlanta, winning a GT-class only event. This was followed by the 6 Hours of Watkins Glen, winning the GTS-1 class and finishing 3rd overall, a mere two laps behind the winning prototype. The factory team would follow this with wins in the GT class at Sonoma Raceway and Laguna Seca. Panoz would finish second to Porsche in the constructors championship that season.

In Europe however, the Esperante GTR-1 suffered from a lack of pace against much better funded factory efforts which were mostly lacking in North America. DAMS was unable to score any points in the championship, while David Price finished third in American soil at Sebring in one of the final rounds of the FIA GT season, earning the team 6th place in the team's championship.

For the 24 Hours of Le Mans, three GTR-1s were entered by David Price and DAMS. None of the cars was able to finish, mostly due to engine difficulties. DAMS car burned, destroying chassis #005 and requiring it to be replaced.

=== 1998 ===
For 1998, with the evolved Esperante GTR-1 bodywork, the program was expanded. The factory Panoz team would race not only in IMSA GT but also in the new United States Road Racing Championship. DAMS would continue in FIA GT, while David Price would drop out in an attempt to develop the Esperante GTR-1 Q9 for the 24 Hours of Le Mans.

In USSRC, the factory Panoz team fought hard with Porsche in the GT class, winning the class in three of the five events in the season but losing to Porsche in the manufacturers championship by a mere three points, although it won the teams championship. In IMSA, Panoz was more dominant as they won seven of the eight races, including taking an overall win at the rain drenched Sebring Fall Festival in October. This earned them the constructors and teams championship for the season.

In Europe, DAMS also proved more powerful. Although incapable of competing with the Mercedes-Benz CLK LM juggernaut, it was able to compete well against the Porsche 911 GT1, earning points in seven of ten rounds with best results of third at Hockenheimring and Dijon-Prenois. This success earned DAMS 5th in the teams championship.

David Price Racing tested the GTR-1 Q9 throughout the season, making its first competition appearance at the test days for the 24 Hours of Le Mans. The car was only able to achieve the 39th fastest time, well behind the two Panoz factory entries. It was found that the car was too overweight and slowed down by the addition of the batteries necessary to run the hybrid system. Thus plans for competing at Le Mans were abandoned. The car would make one more appearance later on in the initial Petit Le Mans, part of the IMSA schedule. The car managed to finish 12th overall. After this, the Q9 project was cancelled.

Meanwhile, with the Q9 gone, the Panoz factory team concentrated on Le Mans with their own two cars. Although one car failed to finish, the second entry managed to take a 7th place overall finish a mere 16 laps behind the overall winning Porsche.

=== 1999 ===
Although the Esperante GTR-1 had major success in 1998, Panoz was aware that grand touring racing cars were becoming highly exotic machines with no road car similarities, such as the Toyota GT-One. Therefore, Panoz realized he would no longer be able to compete against such cars with the Esperante GTR-1, and it was decided that Panoz would move to the Le Mans prototype class. This was also helped by the fact that the FIA GT Championship decided to abandon the GT1 class, leaving the Esperante GTR-1 unable to compete in Europe.

Therefore, while development of the new LMP-1 Roadster-S was underway, Panoz pushed on with the GTR-1 in the new American Le Mans Series. Two GTR-1s would run at Sebring, both failing to finish. At the next race at Road Atlanta, the new LMP-1 debuted and a GTR-1 was also run to give the team something to fall back on. It failed to finish as well. For the next round, a second LMP-1 was completed, and so the GTR-1 was retired completely.

The design of the Esperante GTR-1 would form the basis for the LMP-1 Roadster-S, using the same front engine layout and large nose. It is thus seen that the LMP-1 Roadster-S is an Esperante GTR-1 with its roof taken off, the cars actually do share the same chassis according to a short documentary snippet on YouTube presented by Don Panoz (2021).

=== Final outing ===
In 2003, Panoz decided to resurrect chassis #003 (formerly run by David Price Racing) to run as a closed-cockpit Le Mans prototype before the company switched to the new Esperante GT-LM GT2 car. The car was entered in the 1000km of Le Mans and run by the factory JML Team. The car did not finish due to electronics problems.

Following this event, the car was purchased by French squad Larbre Compétition and further modified, being renamed the Panoz GTP to reflect its change in class. The modified car would debut at the 2004 12 Hours of Sebring, finishing 9th overall. The car would next appear at the 24 Hours of Le Mans, where it dropped out of the race early on. A final appearance was made in the Le Mans Series event at Spa-Francorchamps, taking 14th place. The car would finally be retired for good after the 2004 season.

== Bibliography ==
- Panoz, Don (1997). The Race. London: Haymarket Specialist Publishers.
