= Edinburgh Bicycle Co-operative =

British co-operative bicycle retailer

Edinburgh Bicycle Co-operative Limited

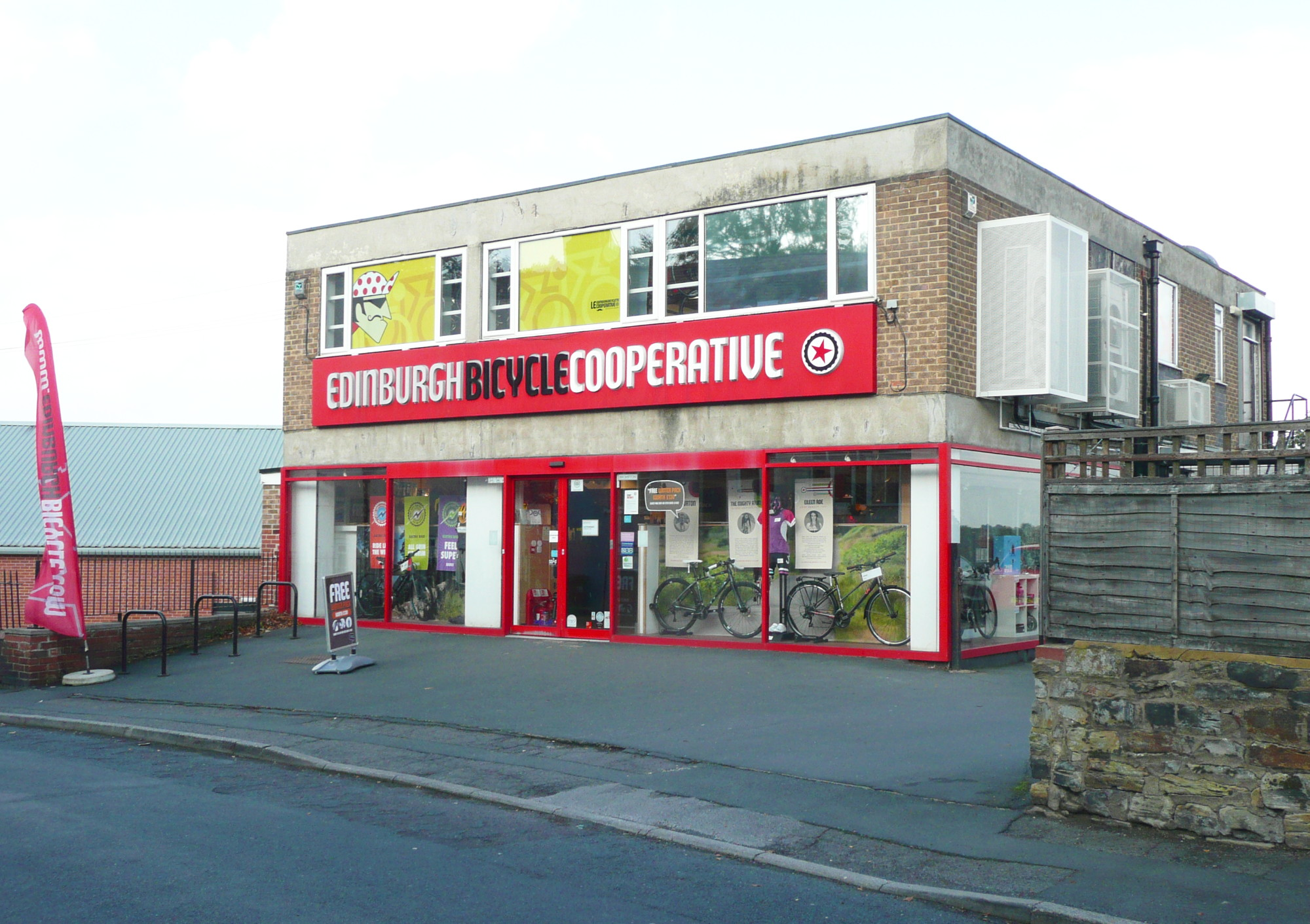
- The co-operative's store in Leeds
- Trade name: Edinburgh Bicycle Co-operative
- Formerly: Recycles Co-operative (until 1985)
- Company type: Worker cooperative
- Industry: Bicycle industry
- Founded: Edinburgh, Scotland (1977; 49 years ago)
- Founder: Chris Hill; Gerry Murray; Morag Ogilvie
- Headquarters: Edinburgh, Scotland, UK
- Number of locations: 6 Stores (2026)
- Area served: Aberdeen; Edinburgh; Stirling; Newcastle
- Services: Sales of bicycles and cycling accessories; Bicycle repair
- Revenue: £12m
- Number of employees: 170
- Website: edinburghbicycle.com

Edinburgh Bicycle Co-operative is a bicycle retailer with three stores across Scotland, two stores in Northern England, and an online store selling worldwide.

The co-operative is the longest-established worker co-operative in Scotland, originally founded as a bicycle repair service in Edinburgh in 1977. In recent years the co-operative has grown to be a dominant bicycle retailer in Scotland.

EBC has its own Revolution self-branded products which are established outside of the Edinburgh branches.

The chain's stores in Manchester closed in 2016, citing Brexit and the shops' location as contributing to the cause of closure.

However, 2023 saw the chain expanding in its home city of Edinburgh, opening its third shop.

The business offers products from leading brands, including Specialized, Whyte, Brompton, Genesis, Kalkhoff, Frog and Giant.
