= Marcos LM600 =

British GT race car

Marcos Mantara LM600
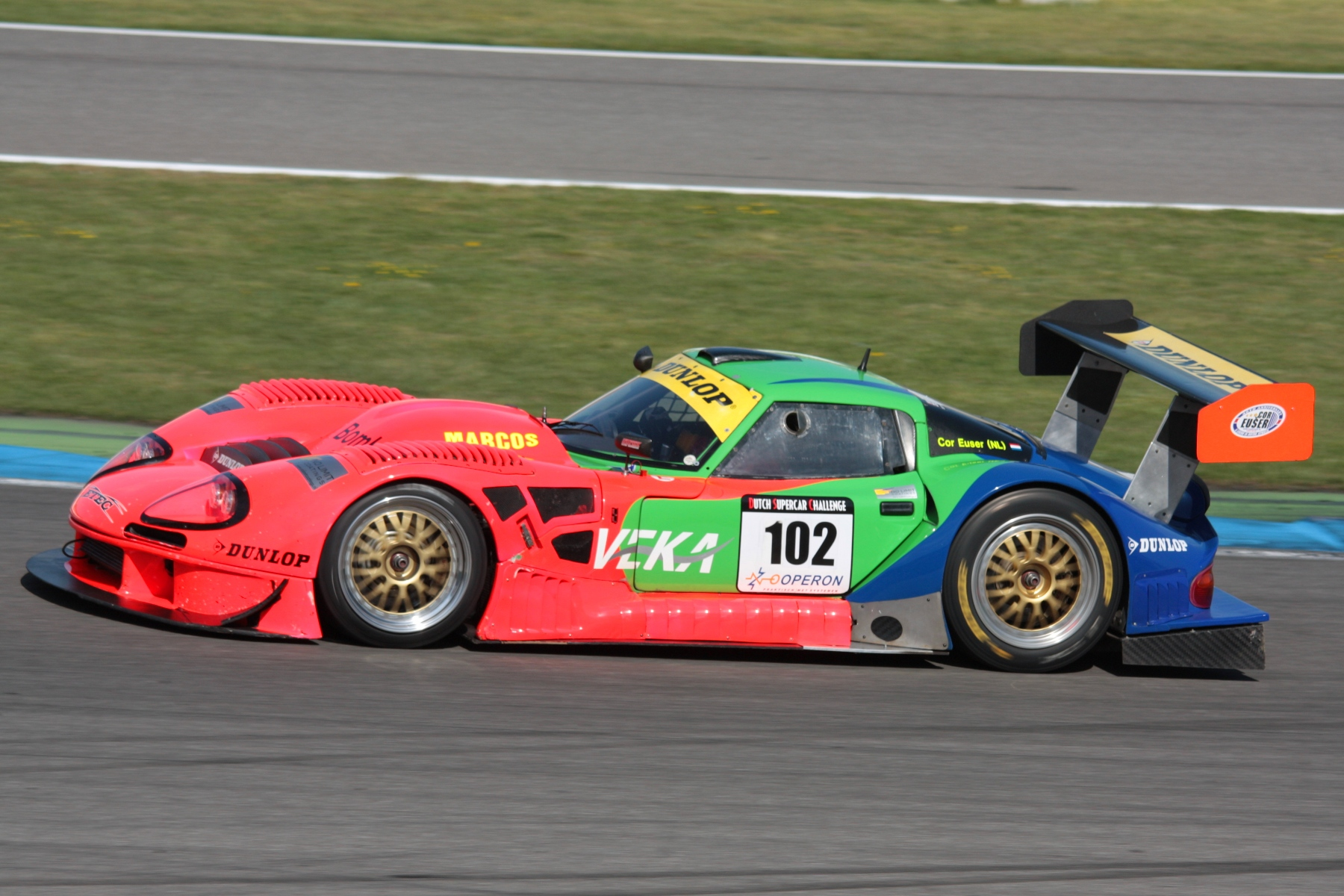
- Cor Euser driving the Marcos Mantara LM600EVO at Hockenheim in 2011.
- Category: GT1 and GT2
- Constructor: Marcos Engineering
- Designers: Marcos Engineering; Wiet Huidekoper
- Production: 1995 to 2000
- Predecessor: Marcos LM400; Marcos LM500

Technical specifications
- Chassis: Steel tube frame
- Suspension: Double wishbone coil springs over anti-shock absorbers, anti-roll bar
- Engine: Chevrolet LS V8 naturally aspirated, front mounted
- Transmission: Hewland 6-speed sequential manual
- Tyres: Dunlop

Competition history
- Notable drivers: (Brazil) Thomas Erdos; (Netherlands) Cor Euser; (United Kingdom) Chris Hodgetts; (United Kingdom) Calum Lockie
- Debut: Silverstone 1995
- Constructors' Championships: 0
- Drivers' Championships: 3

The Marcos Mantara LM600 is a grand tourer-style race car designed and built by Marcos Engineering. Built to GT1 and GT2 regulations based on the Marcos Mantara, it competed in the BPR Global GT Series, the FIA GT Championship, and the British GT Championship from 1995 to 2000. The LM600 also contested the 24 Hours of Le Mans from 1995 to 1997.

== History ==
The LM600 made its competitive debut at the opening round of the 1995 British GT Championship with driver Chris Hodgetts. Conceived as a more powerful iteration of the proceeding Marcos LM400 and LM500 models, the car was also entered into the 1995 BPR Global GT Series and the 1995 24 Hours of Le Mans with support from Cor Euser. Hodgetts quickly delivered the car's first win, taking overall victory in the car's third race appearance in British GT at Donington Park. Despite failing to finish at Le Mans, Hodgetts successfully won the GT2 class championship in British GT at the car's first attempt. Notably, a GT1 specification of the car named the LM600S was entered for driver Thomas Erdos at the final British GT round at Silverstone. After finishing fourth overall, the GT1 LM600 never appeared in competition again.

With increasing support from Euser, who led the factory race team from 1995 onwards, the LM600 began appearing at select BPR Global fly-away races in 1996. The car took its first international class win at the 4 Hours of Jarama and won again in class at the next race at Silverstone. Despite failing to finish two years in a row at Le Mans, the LM600 won a second consecutive championship in 1996, again winning the GT2 class in British GT with three class wins including one overall win at Thruxton.

== Mantara LM600EVO ==
During the 1999 season, the Marcos Engineering company was sold to a Dutch consortium led by Euser. Now in full control of the company in addition to the race team, final assembly was moved to Venlo in the Netherlands and Dutch car designer Wiet Huidekpoer was commissioned to design a new version of the LM600. Named the Mantara LM600EVO, four chassis were built with heavily modified bodywork. Calum Lockie drove the upgraded Mantara LM600EVO to the GT class title in the 2000 British GT Championship, achieving the car's third and final championship.
