= Marcos Engineering =

British sports car manufacturer

Marcos Cars Ltd.
- Type: Private
- Industry: Automotive
- Founded: 1959
- Founder: Jem Marsh; Frank Costin
- Headquarters: Kenilworth, England
- Products: Automobile

Marcos Engineering is a British sports car manufacturer. The name derives from the surnames of founders Jem Marsh and Frank Costin.

== History ==
Marcos was founded in Dolgellau, North Wales, in 1959, by Speedex cars' Jem Marsh with aerodynamicist Frank Costin. Costin had earlier worked on the de Havilland Mosquito fighter-bombers and from there he got the idea to use plywood for the chassis. The company moved to a converted mill in Bradford on Avon, Wiltshire, in 1963; in 1971 they relocated to a £125,000 purpose-built factory at nearby Westbury.

Problems with exporting cars to the US and the move to the expensive new premises led to financial troubles, and in 1971 Marcos went out of business. In July 1971 it was reported that the Rob Walker Group of Companies, a principal dealer, had acquired the stocks and assets and established a new company, Marcos Ltd. The new owners said production would continue, albeit, at least in the short term, only for the UK market, but it is not clear whether any additional cars were built. Although Marcos dealers in the UK had been heavily discounting new cars since the end of 1970, and Motor magazine reported at the time of the collapse that the company's stock of 35 unsold cars in the United States had to be "liquidated", there may have been a substantial stock of new cars without buyers.

In June 1972, what was described as "a cash jumble sale of Marcos bits – prototype and shop soiled components, benches, tools..." took place at the "old Marcos Cars factory" at Westbury. The sale was occasioned by the company's reorganisation and move to a smaller factory.

Marsh stayed in the car business, and bought back the rights to the Marcos name in 1976. In 1981 the brand was relaunched with the Marcos V6 coupé, which was sold in kit form. The design evolved to incorporate both Rover and Ford V8 engines, as well as moving from kit cars to entirely factory-built cars (from 1992), before the company went bankrupt again in 2000.

Canadian entrepreneur Tony Stelliga formed Marcos Engineering with Marsh, and revived production in 2002. Race car production was relocated to the Netherlands while road car production moved to Kenilworth, Warwickshire, England. By 2005, most of the designers from near-to-bankrupt TVR had joined the company.

On 9 October 2007 it was again announced that Marcos would cease production and go into voluntary liquidation. The design property rights, drawings, jigs and car history files were bought by Marcos Heritage Spares Ltd, owned by Rory MacMath, who had worked closely with Marsh on all the Marcos cars. The names Marcos Engineering and Marcos Cars were purchased by engineer Tony Brown who later began development of a new vehicle. Marcos Cars would later partner with former Rich Energy CEO William Storey, and began development of a new supercar.

Marcos Heritage Spares Ltd was acquired by businessman Howard Nash in 2022, who subsequently formed "Marcos Motor Company" and began development of a series of new vehicles. The first new Marcos vehicle in over a decade was revealed by Marcos Motor Company in 2025. Both Marcos Cars and Marcos Motor Company are involved in an ongoing dispute over the rights to the Marcos brand.

== GT Xylon, Luton Gullwing; fastback GT ==
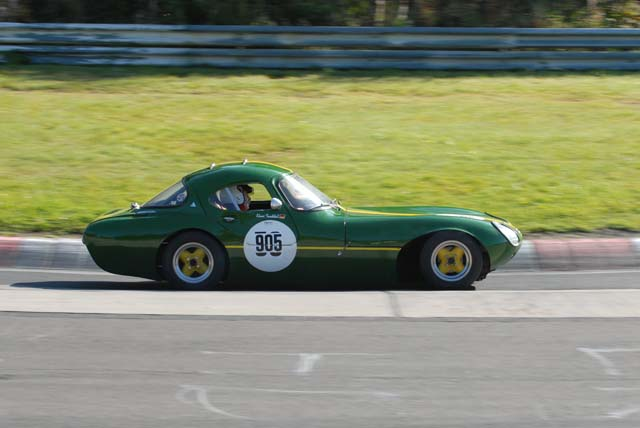
1961/1962 Marcos Luton gullwing at Nürburgring, 2007

Their first car, the Xylon, which had gullwing doors and a windscreen in four panels, was nicknamed the "ugly duckling". A total of nine, aimed at 750 Motor Club events, were built in 1959 and 1960. For production the body was made less radical but initially retained the gullwing doors. It was powered by a choice of Ford engines varying from 997 to 1498 cc and had Standard 10 and Triumph Herald steering and suspension components. Thirty-nine were made up to 1963.

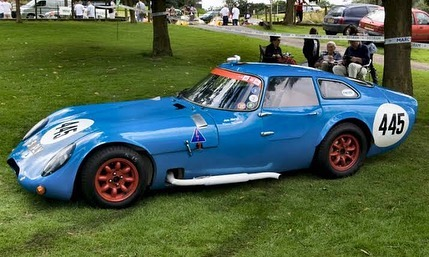
Fastback GT

In 1961, brothers Dennis Adams and Peter Adams started working with Marcos and introduced several changes to the original design. The Marcos Luton gullwing and the spyder were introduced in November 1961. This design was again reworked, becoming the Marcos fastback GT, which was displayed at the London Racing Car Show in 1963. The chassis was fabricated from laminated 3 mm thick sheets of marine plywood, giving the cars strong monocoques and low weights (the GT was internationally homologated with 475 kg), so they performed well in sportscar competition. Most early Marcos models competed in national and international events.

== Marcos 1800GT ==
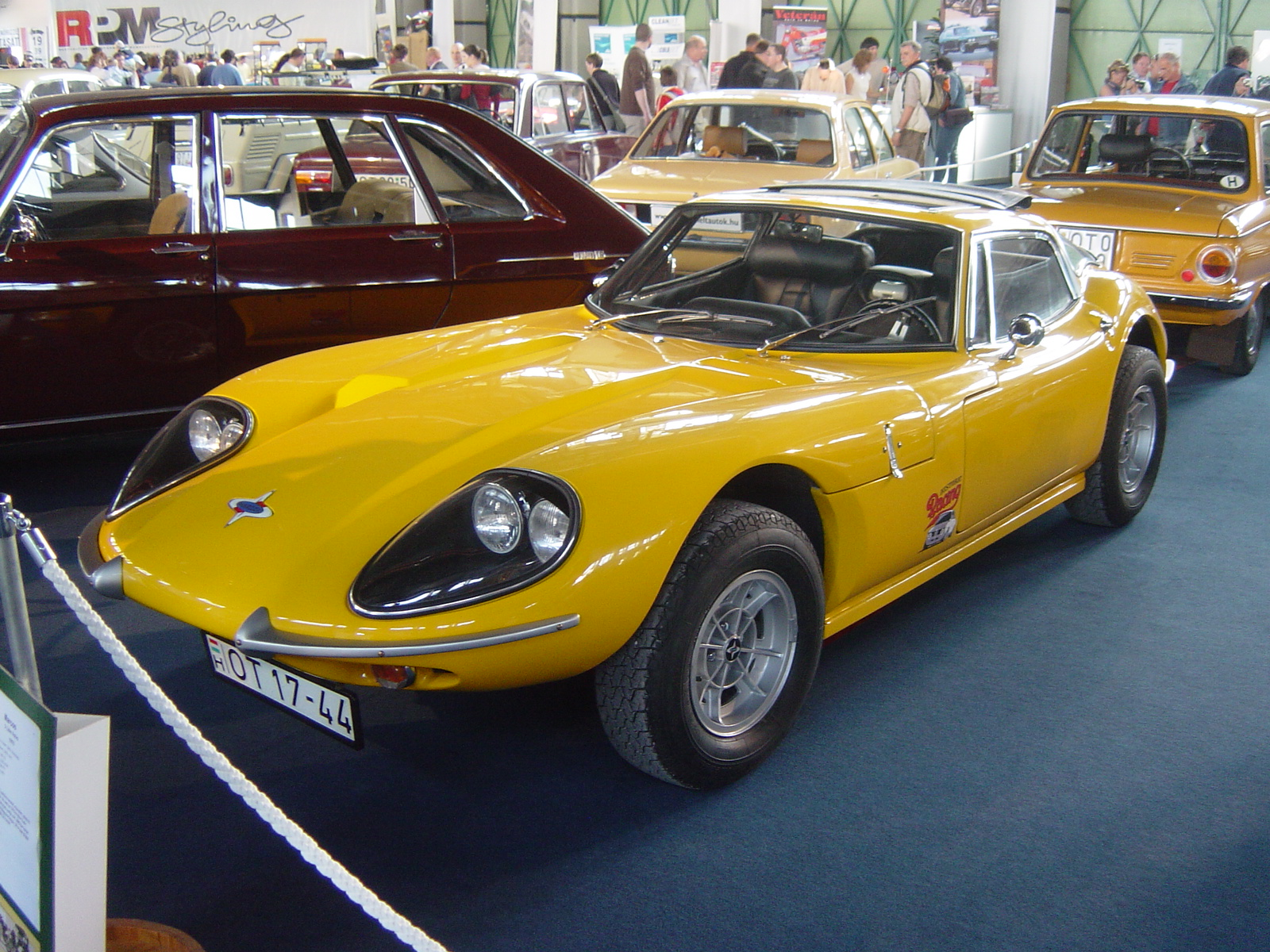
1970–1971 Marcos 3-litre, Volvo-engined

In 1964 the Marcos 1800 GT was introduced, using the four-cylinder Volvo B18 engine with overdrive gearbox and De Dion rear axle. This was to be the design that would become familiar to sports car enthusiasts for more than 30 years, even though the original plywood chassis was later replaced by a steel chassis. A variety of other engines, mostly from Ford, but also from Triumph and Volvo, became available over the years. In 1966 the GT was changed to Ford engines of originally 1500 cc, later 1650 and 1600 cc, and a coil-sprung live rear axle. In 1968 the Ford Essex V6 engine from the Capri Mk1 was added. In 1969 the plywood chassis was replaced by steel, which shortened production time and saved on cost, and the Ford Essex V4 engine replaced the earlier inline-fours. In 1971 a few cars with Triumph 2.5-litre straight-sixes were built, to use up engines from the slow selling Mantis. As the bonnet was a close fit over the engine, this variety of engine resulted in a corresponding variation in the bonnet design, particularly as regards changes designed to clear engine air intakes, often the only external sign of the type of engine fitted.

The Ford V6 version achieved over 120 mph (190 km/h) on test and the Volvo-engined model was not far behind it, but the heavy cast-iron engines increased nose-weight in comparison to the four-cylinder variants. From 1970 cars for the North American markets received Volvo's inline-six cylinder, three-litre engines coupled to Borg-Warner automatic transmissions. These have tubular steel space frames, a higher ride height and no headlight covers, to achieve US road certification. Delays and problems with the federalised cars, together with the development costs of the Mantis, led the company to close its doors for the first time.

The Marcos intellectual rights, including jigs, build files and logos were bought by Marcos director Rory MacMath, later working under the title "Marcos Heritage Spares" as a restoration and parts company for Marcos Cars. Marcos Heritage Spares was later acquired by businessman Howard Nash in 2022, and now makes up a part of the revived Marcos Motor Company.

== Mini Marcos ==
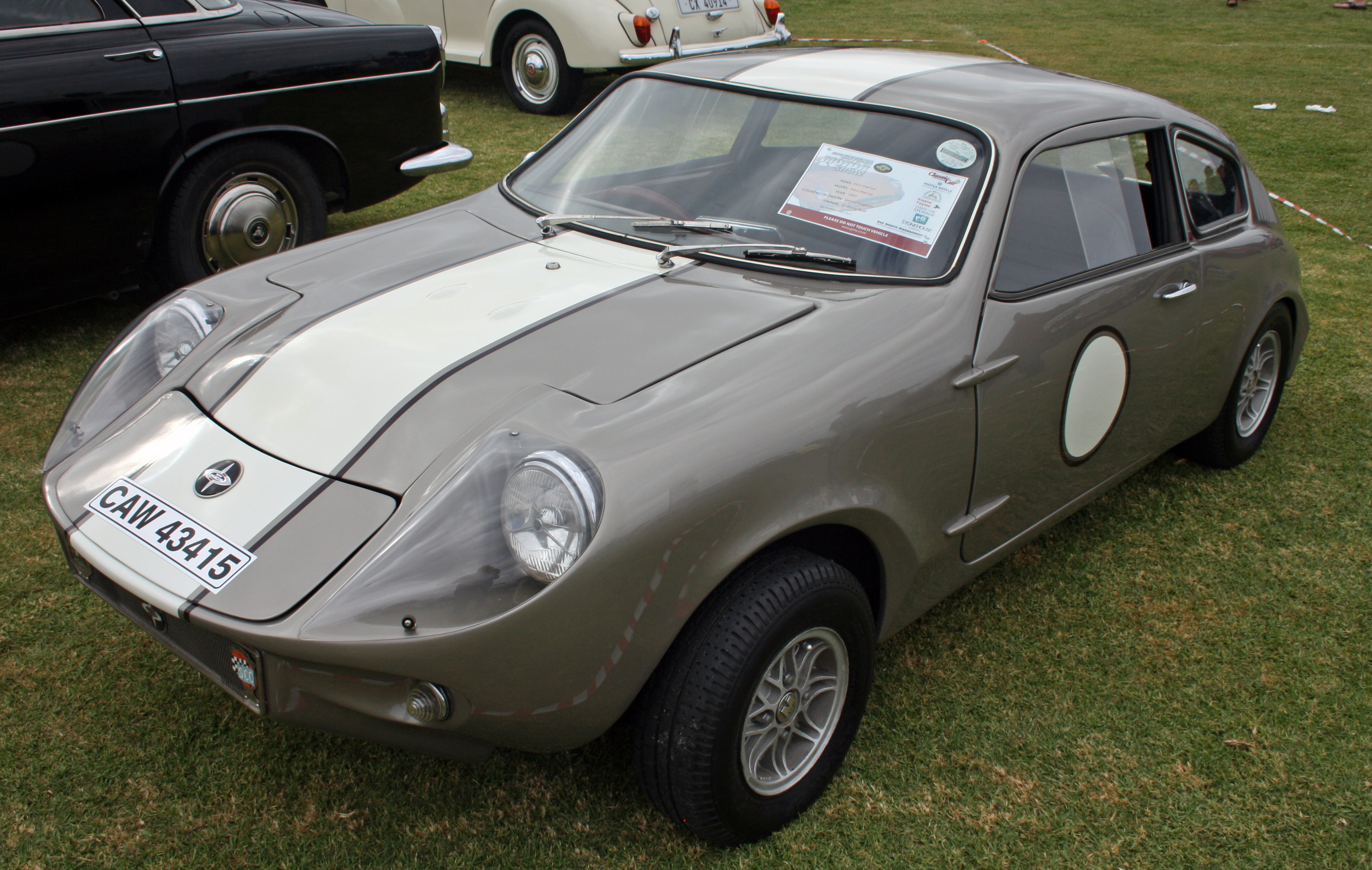
Mini Marcos

The front-wheel drive Mini Marcos, designed by Malcolm Newell, was introduced in 1965. With a fibreglass monocoque body, Mini subframes and suspension, and a wheelbase of 80 inches (2,000 mm), it is powered by a transversely mounted Mini A-series engine driving the front wheels. A French-entered example came 15th overall in the 1966 Le Mans race, the only British car to finish.

When Marcos stopped making the car in about 1975, another company produced updated versions as the "Midas". Cars were also made under licence in South Africa, Australia and Ireland.

Revived in 1991 for the Japanese market, production continued until 1995. A total of over 1300 Mini Marcos cars have been sold in kit form and as complete cars.

After the demise of Marcos Sales Limited, the Mini Marcos moulds were acquired by Marcos Heritage Spares, who relaunched the car in 2005 as the Marcos Heritage Mk. VI and Mk. VI GT.

== Marcos Mantis ==
In 1968 came the first Mantis, the Mantis XP. A racing car designed for the Group 6 Prototype category, it was powered by a mid-mounted Repco V8 engine. Like earlier Marcos cars it used a plywood monocoque chassis, albeit different from that of the GT. Only one car was made, and its only race was the 1968 1,000 km event at Spa, where it retired with electrical problems in heavy rain. Originally Marcos intended to race it in the 1968 Le Mans, but that was postponed from June to September, and by then the car was in America, fitted with a Buick V8 engine (from which the Rover V8 engine was derived).

A full restoration of the XP was completed in 2008. Now based in America, it has visited the UK for the Marcos 50th anniversary celebrations and the Goodwood Festival of Speed.

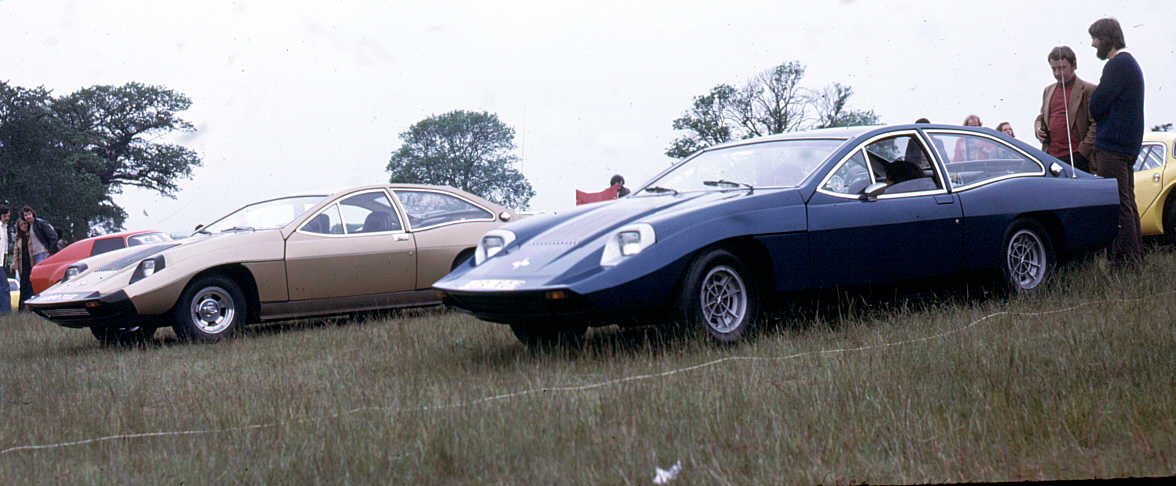
1971 Marcos Mantis M70

The next Mantis, the four-seater M70, was launched in 1970 and had a fuel-injected 2.5-litre Triumph TR6 six-cylinder injected engine mated to a four-speed gearbox. The promotional brochure says the styling "gives high all round visibility", and "a low centre of gravity together with an extremely wide track ensures superb roadholding. The luxurious interior seats four in comfort, and the boot, with a capacity of 10 cubic feet, makes the Mantis ideal for the man who is going places and wants to travel in style".

Thirty-two were sold before the company went into liquidation in 1972. Autotune acquired the moulds and produced a few more cars in the mid-1980s as "Autotune Mirages".

== Marcos returns ==
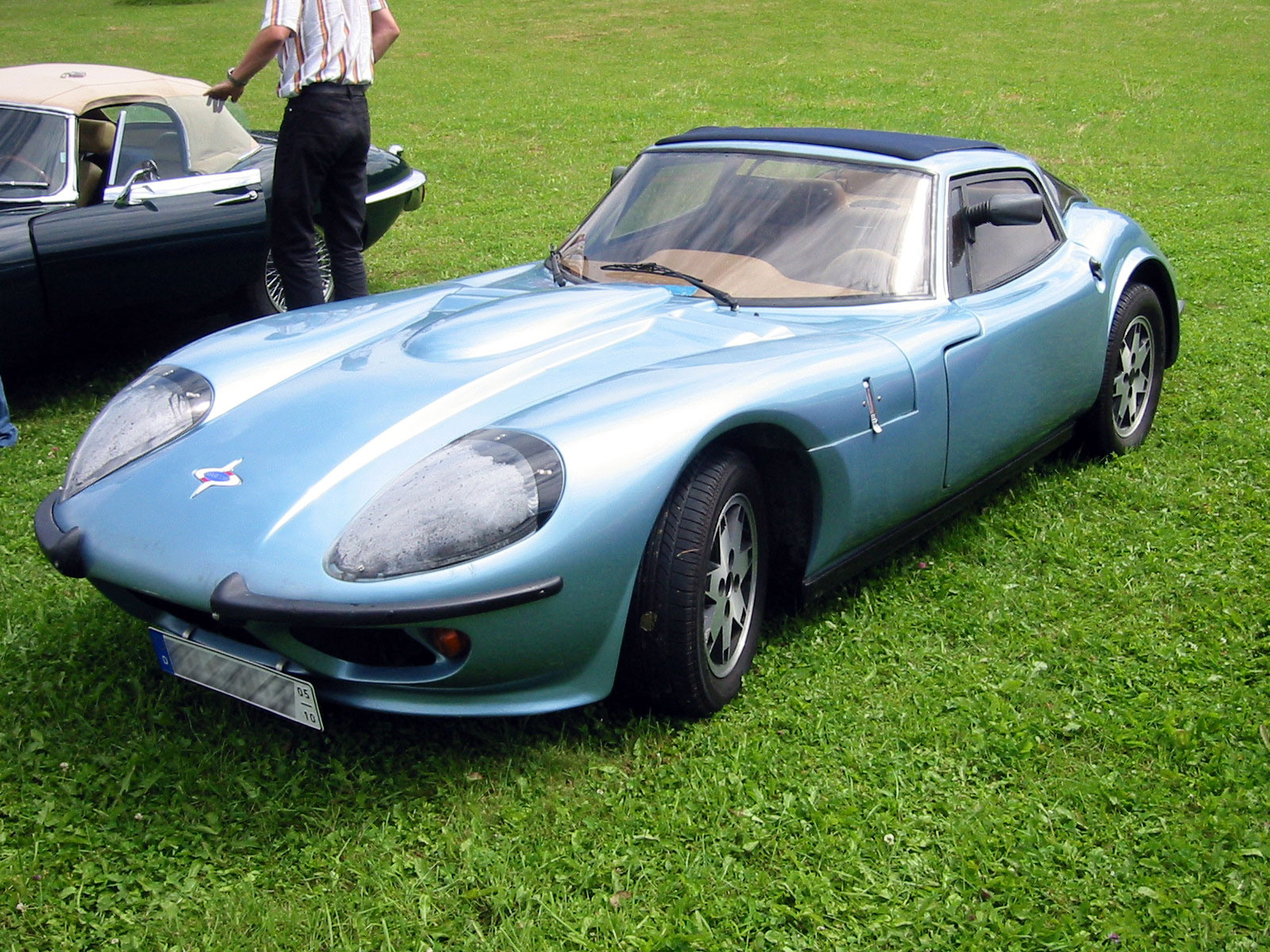
Marcos GT

Jem Marsh resurrected the Marcos brand in 1981, offering the previous GT cars as kits. Engine options included Ford's 3.0 Essex V6, 2.8 Cologne V6, 1600 Crossflow, 2.0 Pinto and 2.0 V4s, plus Triumph's 2.0 and 2.5 straight sixes. About 130 kits were sold up to 1989.

=== Marcos Mantula, Spyder and Martina ===
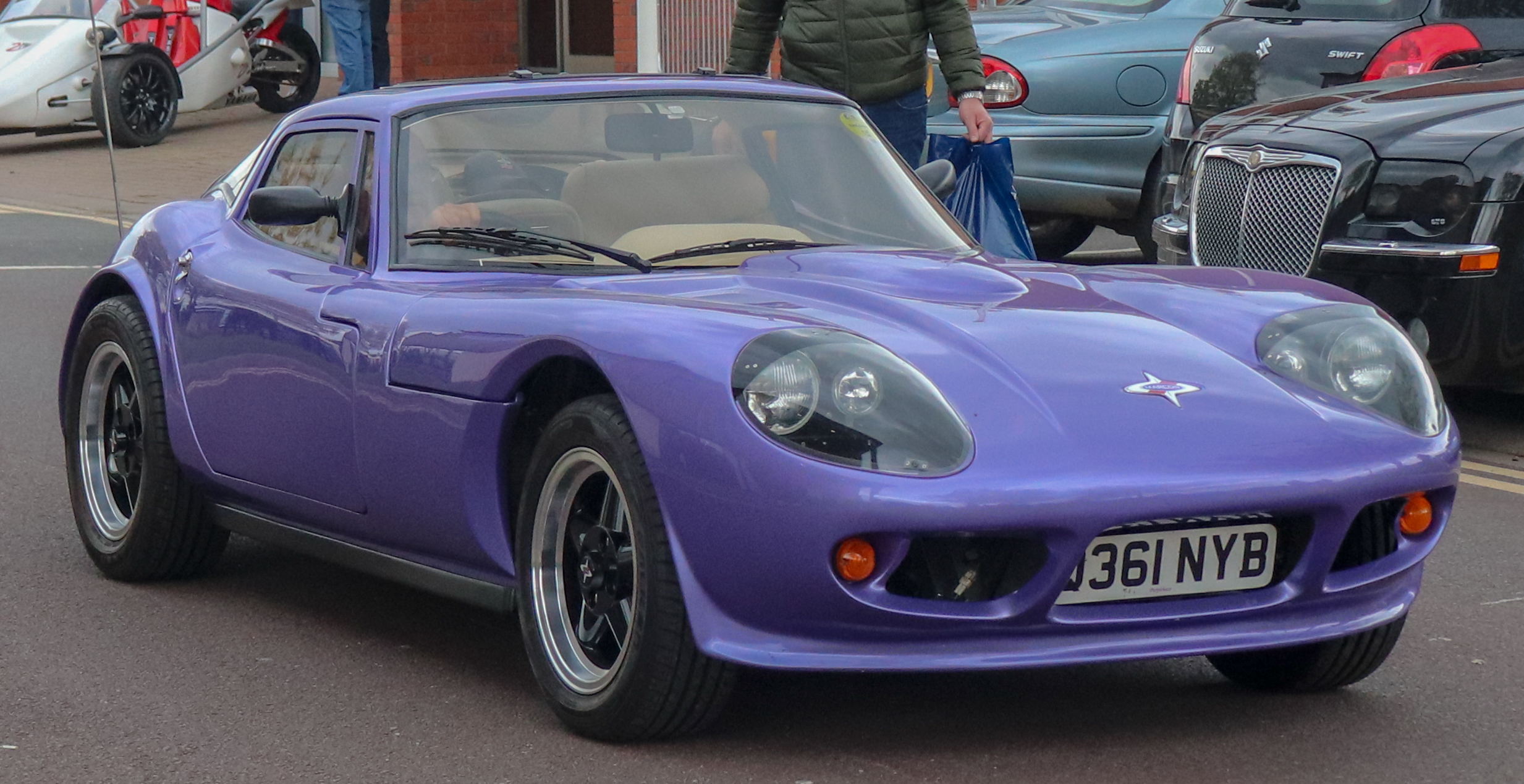
1989 Marcos Mantula

In 1983 the Marcos Mantula was introduced, externally very similar to the old GT, but now powered by a 3.5-litre Rover V8 with a 5-speed gearbox producing 190 hp (142 kW) at 5280 rpm and 220 lb⋅ft (298 N⋅m) of torque at 4000 rpm. This alloy engine weighed less than the previous six-cylinder cast-iron units, reducing overall weight to about 900 kg and making the car competitive against other Rover-powered sports cars such as TVR and Morgan. When tested by Motorweek, the Mantula completed 0-60 mph (97 km/h) in 5.7 seconds, with a top speed of 136.9 mph (220 km/h). The engine evolved into the Rover Vitesse EFi engine, and later Mantulas were fitted with the 3.9 EFi. In 1986 the model was made available as a convertible, the Marcos Spyder, which would outsell the coupés in later production. 1989 saw the introduction of independent rear suspension, together with the Ford Sierra's 7" differential and rear disc brakes. The independent suspension allowed a full-width boot and the relocation of the battery and heater/air conditioning. A total of 170 coupés and 119 Spyders were produced.

Launched in 1991, the Marcos Martina was externally very similar to the Mantula, but with flared front wheel arches. It used the Ford Cortina's 2-litre four-cylinder engine, steering and suspension, and approximately 80 were produced. Originally available as kits or factory-built, the cars were all factory-built from 1992. Production of the Mantula and Martina ceased in 1993.

=== Marcos Mantara, Mantara GTS and LM cars ===
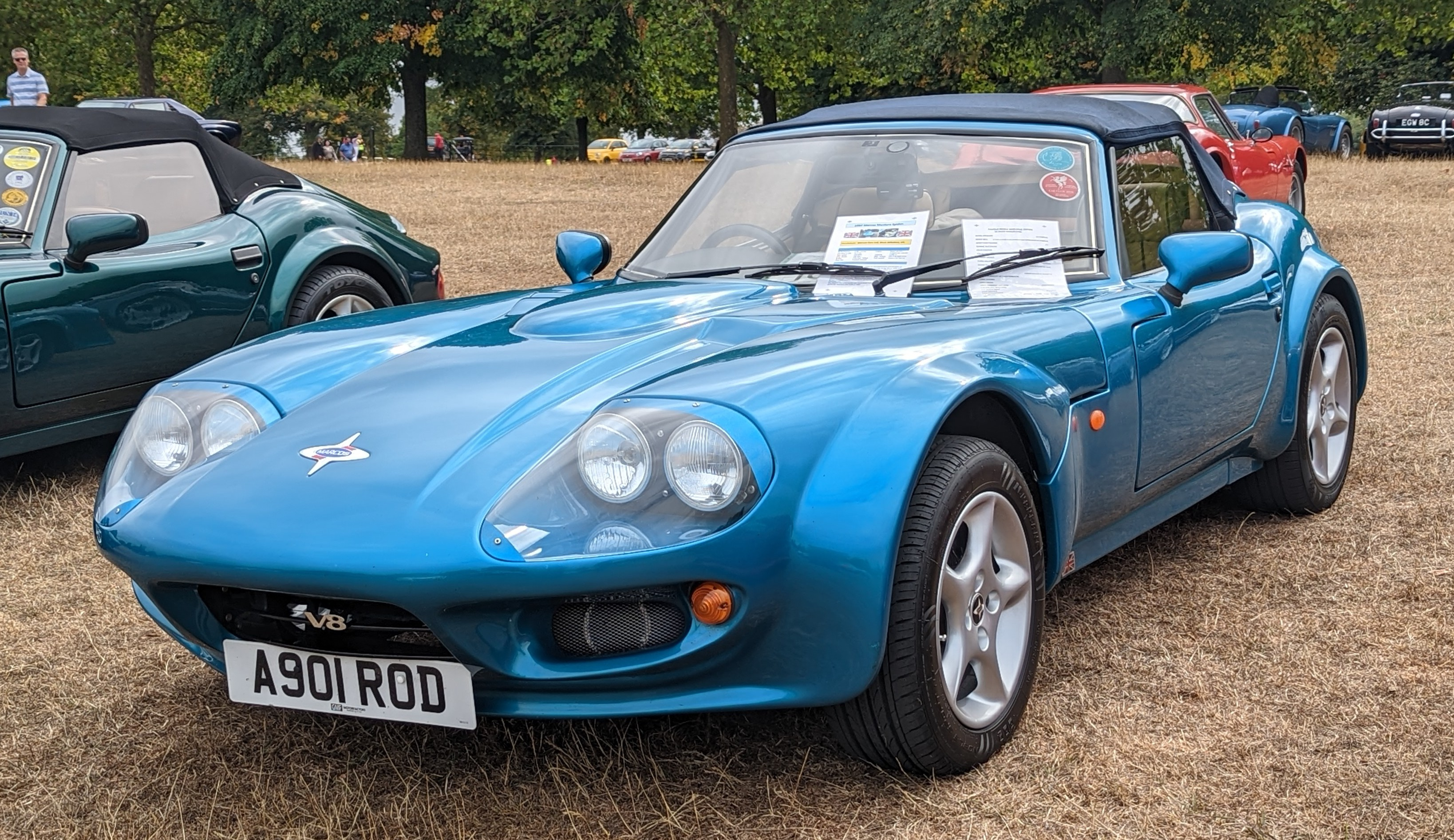
Marcos Mantara Spyder

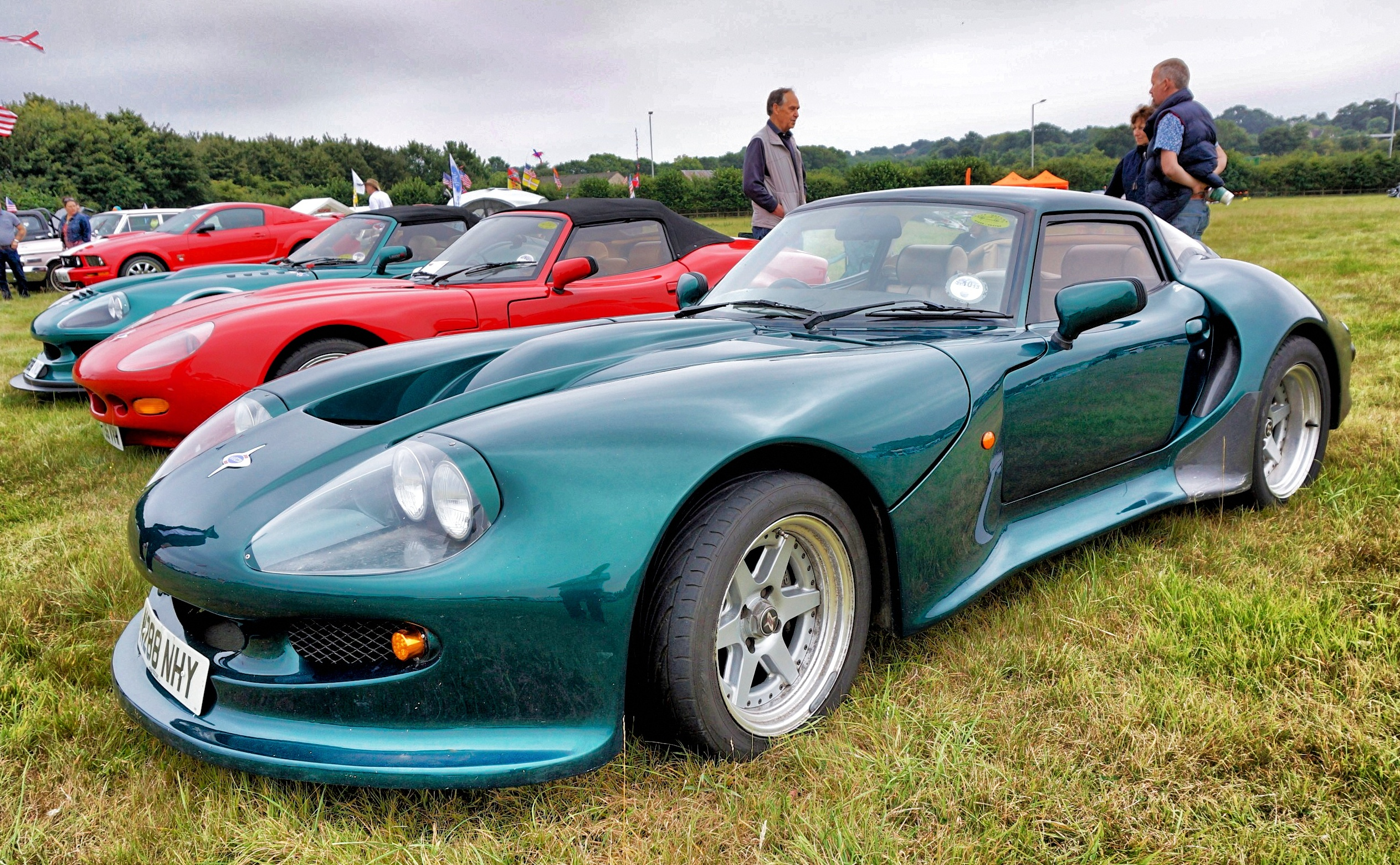
Marcos Mantara LM500 road car with a 5-litre Rover V8 engine

In 1992 Marcos left the kit car business, all cars from this point onwards being factory built, and launched the Marcos Mantara which was sold through dealers in limited numbers. The main difference between the Mantara and the Mantula was the adoption of MacPherson strut front suspension in place of the Triumph suspension and associated trunnions. This change resulted in a wider front track, different bonnet, and flared front arches. The rear wheel arches and rear lights were also changed to give the car a more modern appearance. Power steering was also available for the first time. The Mantara was powered as standard by a 3.9-litre fuel injected Rover V8 or a 4.6-litre Rover V8 as an optional alternative.

The Marcos GTS was a version of the Mantara powered by the 2-litre Rover Tomcat engine, on request of the Italian distributor Martes Spider Cars. The top version was the 200 bhp (149 kW; 203 PS) turbo version. The GTS version of the Mantara had a slightly different bonnet incorporating much smoother lines, flared-in headlamps, and a deeper spoiler, which was used on the later Mantaray model. A handful of late Mantara V8's were produced with the same bonnet as the 2.0 litre GTS.

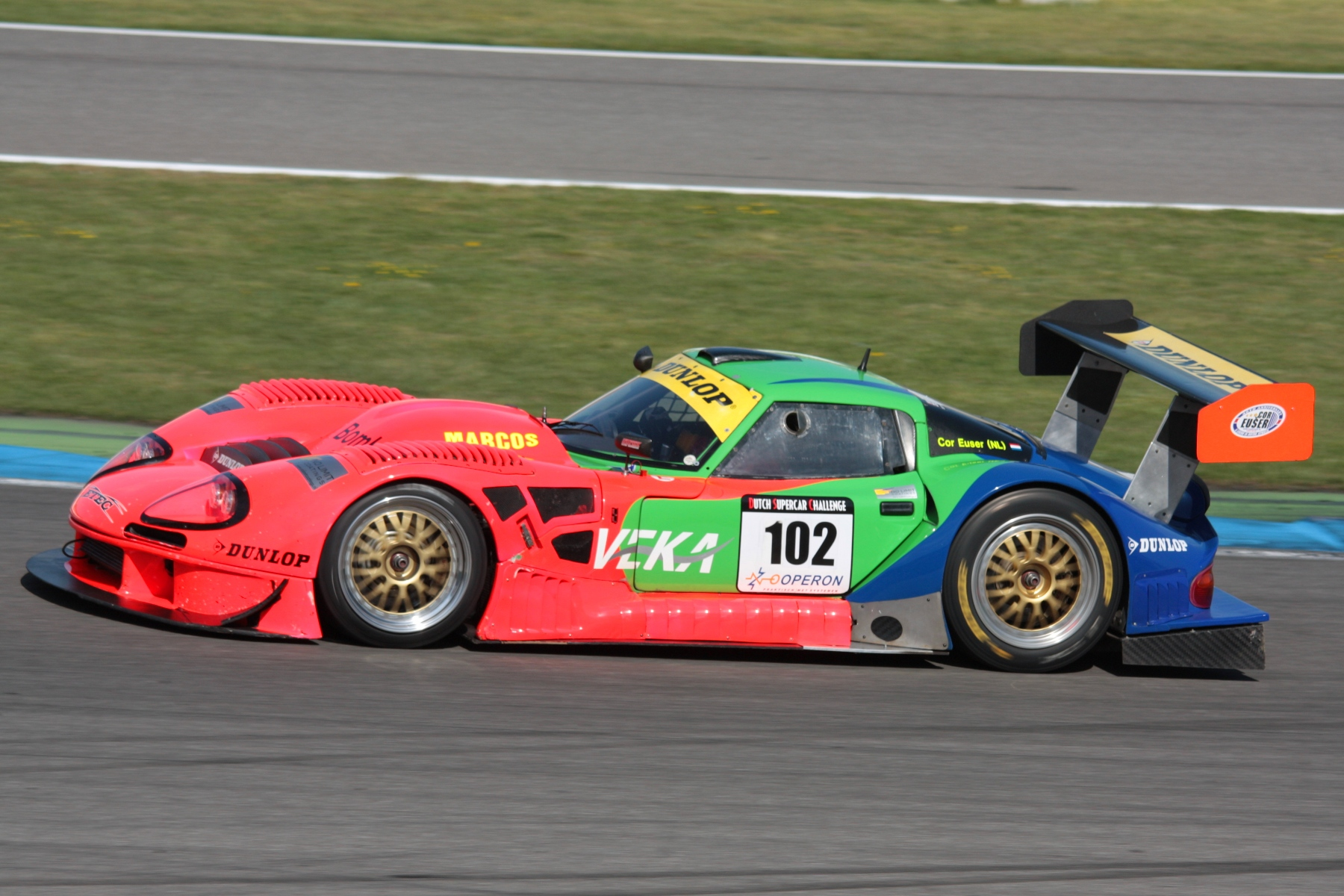
Cor Euser driving a Marcos LM600 at first race of Dutch Supercar Challenge at "Preis der Stadt Stuttgart" 2011

For a return to GT racing, a range of modified Mantaras was also produced in the LM (Le Mans) versions. To qualify as a production vehicle, a limited number of road going cars were also made. Several versions of the LM were made such as the LM400 (with a Rover 3.9-litre V8 engine), LM500 (Rover 5-litre V8) and LM600 (6-litre Chevrolet small-block V8). Only 30 road-going LM cars were ever built, and of these only one was a road-going LM600.

=== Marcos Mantis ===
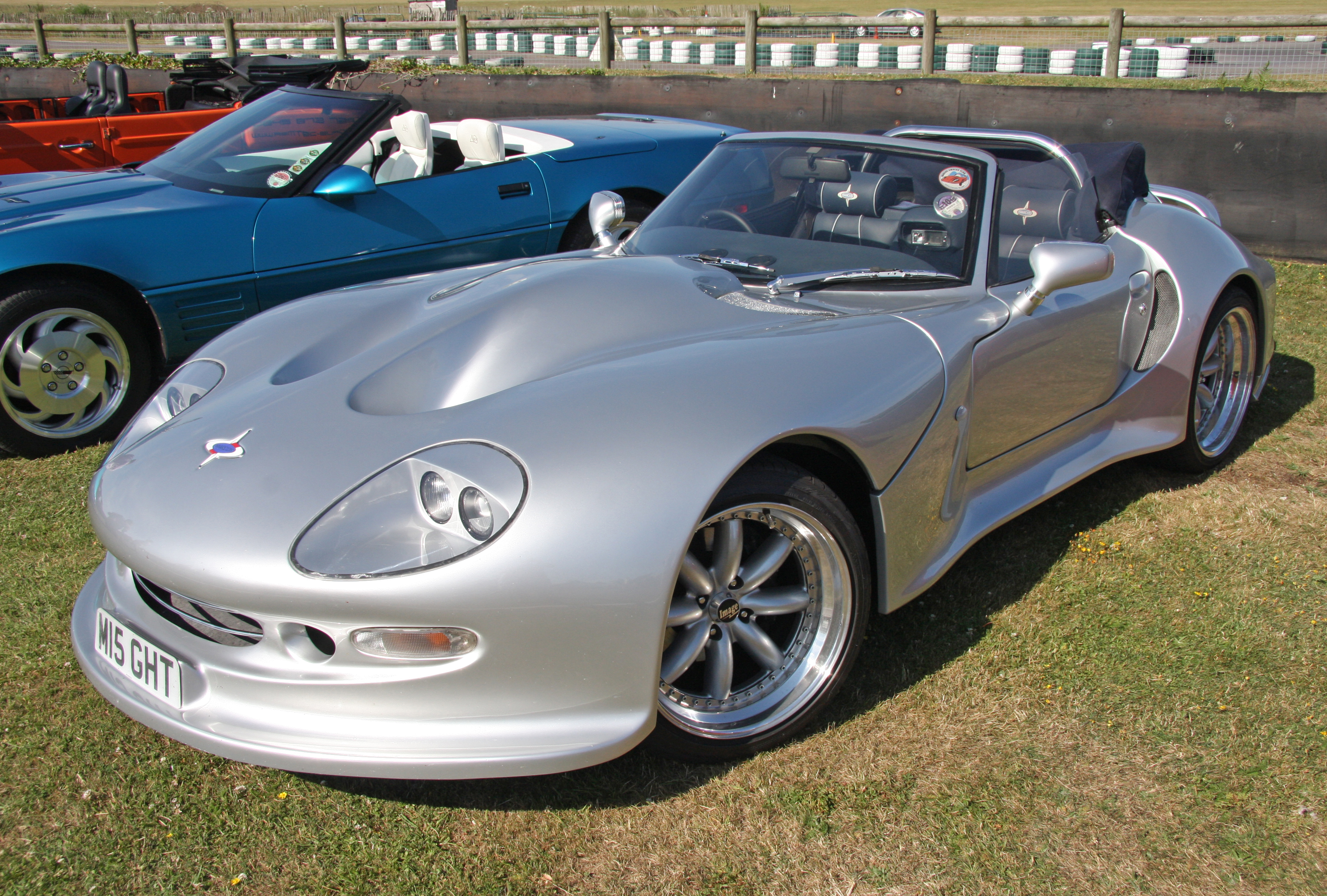
Marcos Mantis

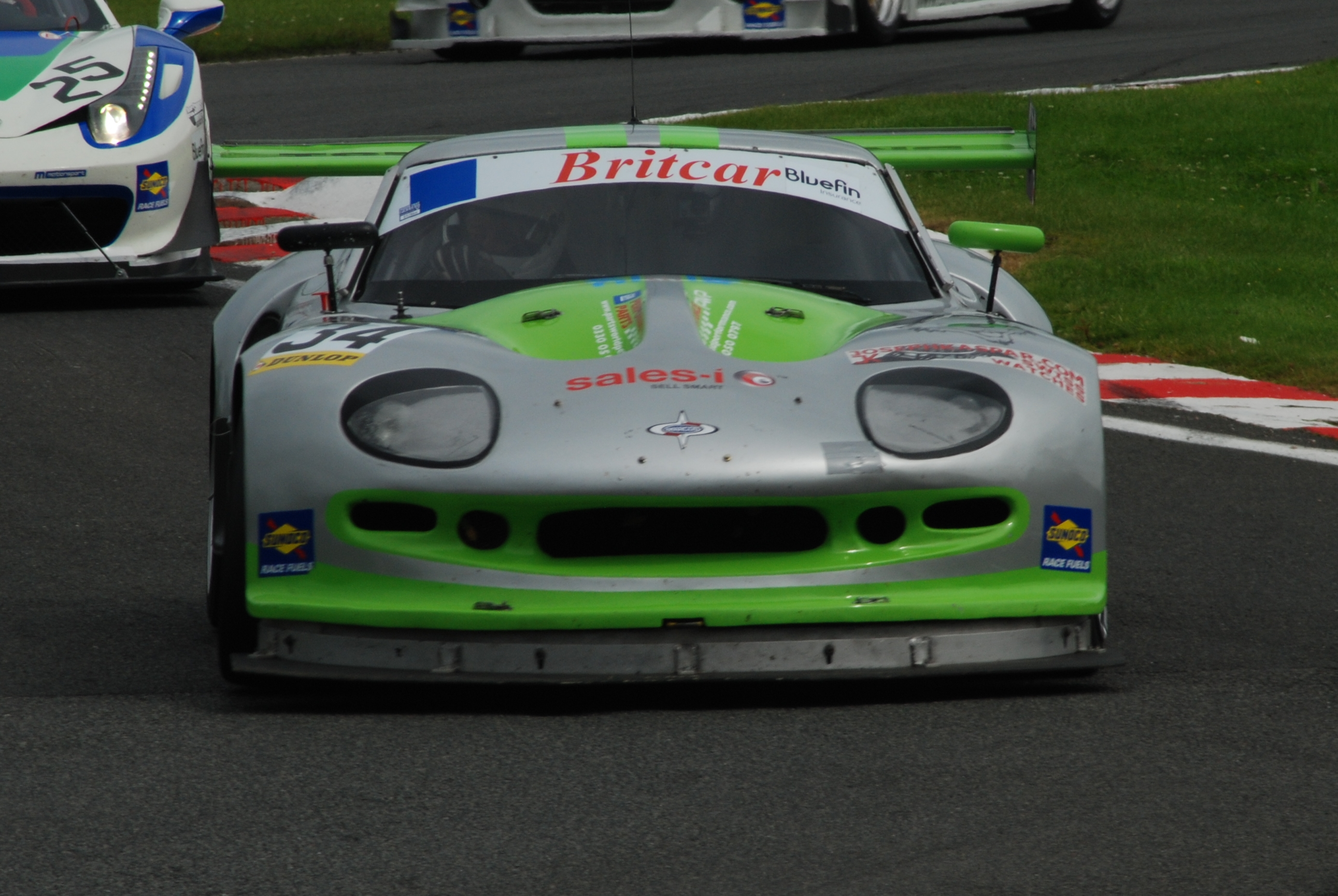
Marcos Mantis GT

In 1997 the Mantis name was re-used on a 2-seater coupé or convertible road car based on the LM series powered by the 4.6-litre all-aluminium quad-cam Ford 'Modular' engine producing 327 bhp (244 kW; 332 PS) and capable of 170 mph (270 km/h). To accommodate the engine the bonnet of the Mantis was significantly remodelled from the previous LM range (that used the Rover V8), and the upper chassis rails in the engine bay were widened. Price for the Mantis was £46,883.

In 1998 it was decided to supercharge the engine to produce one of the few British production sports car with over 500 bhp (373 kW; 507 PS), this being named the Mantis GT. It was first sold in Italy by Martes Spider Cars. Using a Vortech supercharger and intercooler the Mantis GT engine produced 506 bhp (377 kW; 513 PS), which could accelerate the car from 0–60 mph in 3.7 seconds. Price for the Mantis GT was £64,331.

Production of the Mantis was 51 cars, with 16 being the supercharged GT version (this does not include the Mantis Challenge race cars).

=== Marcos Mantaray ===
In 1997 the Mantara evolved into the Marcos Mantaray, with the re-styled bonnet from the Mantara GTS and with a new shape rear-end. Mechanically the car was identical to the Mantara. It was offered with 4.0 and 4.6-litre Rover V8 as well as the 2-litre, and 2-litre turbo Rover Tomcat engines. Only 11 were made with the 4.0-litre, and seven with the 4.6-litre engine. Total factory production was 26, plus one car in chassis/body component form.

== Marcos in the 21st century ==
=== Marcos Marcasite ===
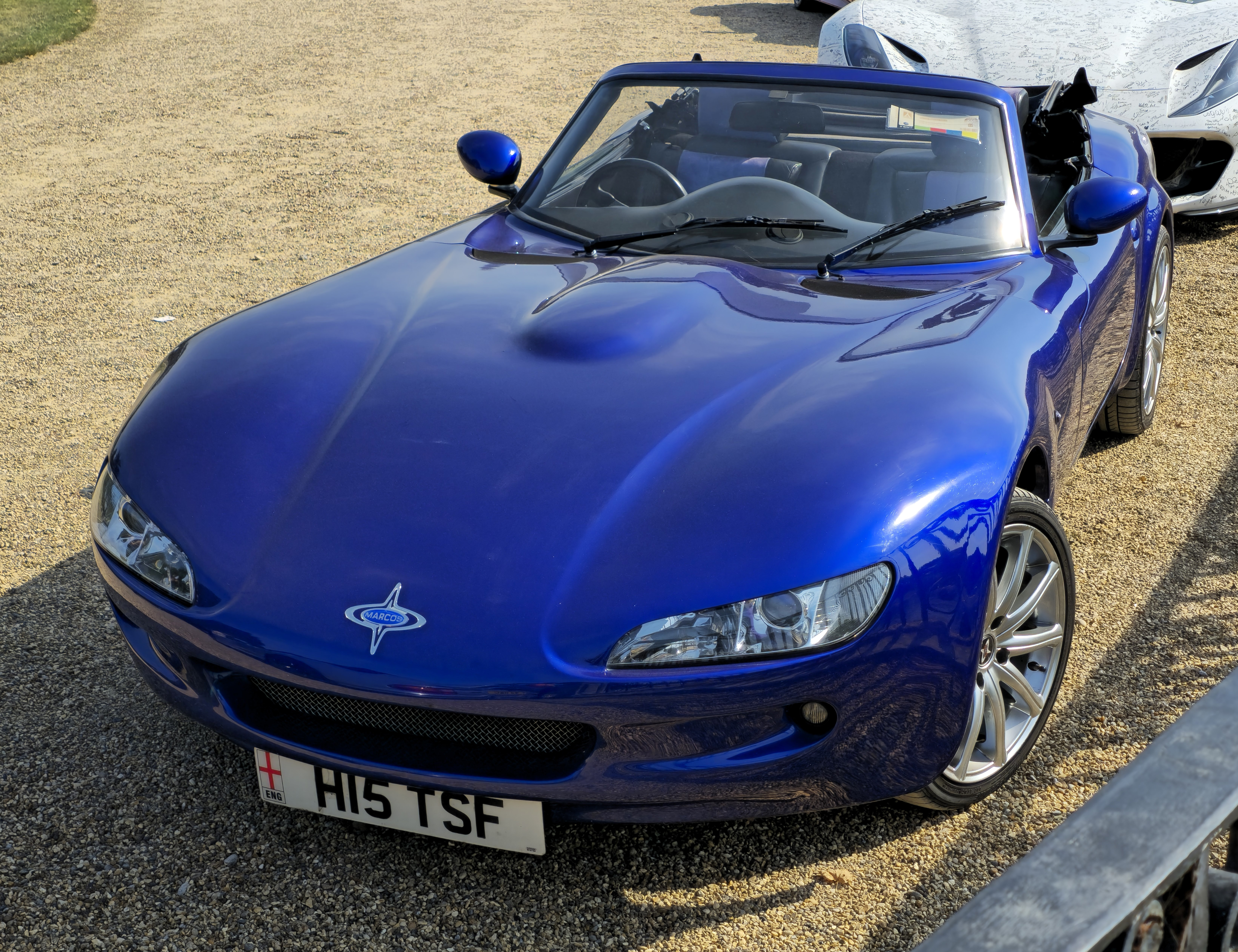
2004 Marcos TS 500 at Hampton Court Concourse in 2024.

In 2002, after a break in production caused by bankruptcy, a new company (Marcos Engineering Ltd) was launched with Jem Marsh as vice-chairman, and with the financial backing of Canadian Tony Stelliga, to manufacture the Marcasite TS250 with a 2.5-litre 175 bhp (130 kW; 177 PS) Ford V6 followed in 2003 by the 5-litre Rover V8-powered TS500. The 2002 price of the TS250 was £29,744 +VAT, with options such as air-conditioning (£1634), full leather interior (£1626) and Hydratrak differential (£360). Other unpriced options included an elm or walnut veneer dashboard, and a newly designed hard top.

=== Marcos TSO ===
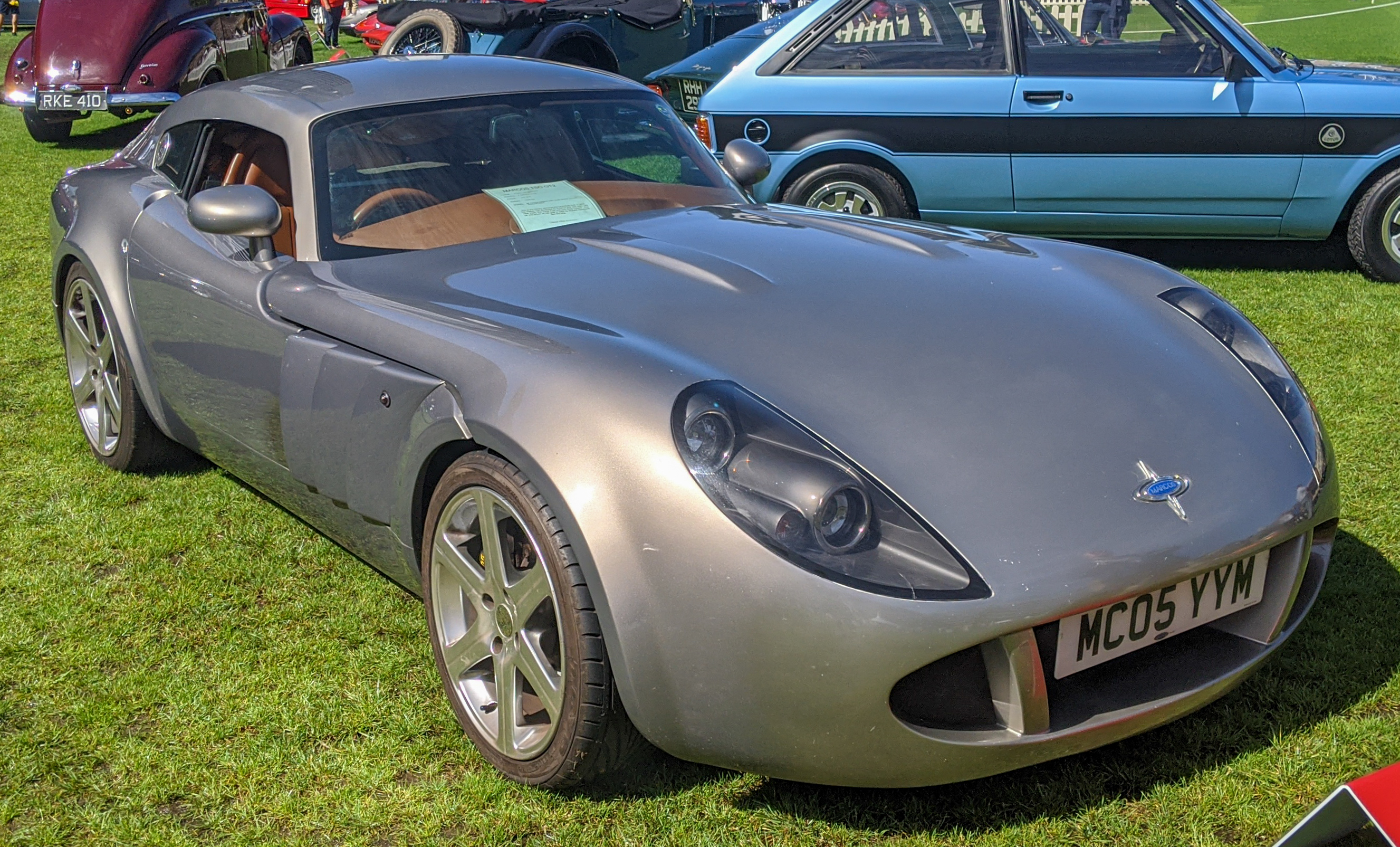
2005 Marcos TSO GT2 Prototype

The Marcos TSO was launched in 2004 with a Chevrolet V8 engine in either 350 bhp (261 kW; 355 PS) or 400 bhp (298 kW; 406 PS) versions. The car's components were designed using CAD in England, and its chassis engineering was completed by Prodrive. These vehicles were produced by Tony Stelliga of Marcos.

Also in 2004, the 5.7-litre Chevrolet Corvette (LS1) V8 TSO GT was announced, but solely for the Australian market. It was joined in 2005 by the GT2 for the European market.

In 2006, Tony Stelliga announced the TSO GTC, a modified version of the current TSO with a racing suspension, racing brakes and a rear diffuser. The car continues on with its Chevrolet-sourced 420 bhp (313 kW) V8, but there was also a 462 bhp (345 kW) Performance Pack available as well. With the extra power from the Performance Pack, the TSO GTC accelerated to 60 mph (97 km/h) in 4.1 seconds and to 100 mph (161 km/h) in 8.5 seconds. With the bigger 340 mm (13 in) AP Racing brakes, the TSO GTC delivered a 0–100–0 time of 12.9 seconds, and the extra power allowed it to accelerate from 50 to 70 mph (110 km/h) in 2.1 seconds. Its top speed was over 185 mph (298 km/h).

2 prototypes and 7 production models cars exist. Tony Stelliga's company went into liquidation in October 2007.

=== Marcos Spirit 220 ===
In 2010, Marcos Cars Limited, Marcos Engineering Limited, and the original Marcos Logo were purchased and registered by ex F1 and IndyCar engineer Tony Brown, who intended on relaunching the brand in the United Kingdom.

A mid-engine prototype was revealed in 2013. The design was a major move away from the original front-engine designs. However, Jem Marsh was consulted during the development process. Both he and Dennis Adams gave their approval. The car was later refined and underwent a few design changes in light of further testing. In 2023, Brown announced he was seeking investment to move the company forward.

In 2025, Marcos partnered with former Rich Energy CEO William Storey, who became the new CEO of the company. Storey announced that Marcos would be launching a "new F1 inspired supercar" named the Manticore, designed and built in Britain later that year.

=== Marcos Project Mosquito ===
Despite the announcements by Marcos Cars, Marcos Heritage Spares, alongside all the original assets of the brand had been acquired from Rory MacMath by businessman Howard Nash in 2022, who subsequently formed the "Marcos Motor Company".

Marcos Motor Company later revealed the Marcos Project Mosquito, the first new Marcos vehicle in over a decade, in 2025. Using the running gear of the R53 Mini Cooper, the Mosquito is a modern tribute to the Mini Marcos. Despite originally being conceived as a test bed, Nash later announced his intention to produce the Mosquito as a limited production track only vehicle. Following this, Marcos Motor Company announced plans for a completely new, mid engine vehicle, alongside a modern revival of the Marcos GT.

William Storey described the announcements made by Howard Nash and Marcos Motor Company as "misleading", stating that Marcos Cars was the legal owner of the brand and their supercar was the "only genuine new Marcos vehicle." Marcos Motor Company responded by stating that Storey's enterprise did not have the assets or rights to the company. The dispute is ongoing.

== Racing history ==
=== Wooden wonders ===
Marcos started out with race cars, with the first Xylon cars being built specifically for the 750 motor club races. Among the drivers were Jackie Stewart, Bill Moss, John Sutton, Jack Gates, John Mitchell and Jackie Oliver, as well as Jem Marsh. The young Jackie Stewart achieved 4 victories in 1961, while Bill Moss managed 9 victories in 10 starts. John Sutton won the 1961 Autosport Championship, and together with Jack Gates and John Mitchell, Marcos won the team prize.

When the car went into production as the Luton Gullwing many examples were bought for racing. In 1962 Stephen Minoprio was the Autosport 1000cc GT Champion in his Gullwing – setting 7 lap records in the process.

The Gullwing in turn evolved into the GT Fastback, also known as the 'Breadvan'. All 18 fastbacks made in 1963 went into racing, and like the Xylon and Gullwing they were FIA homologated in the GT category. However, without the gull wing doors, the fastbacks were awkward to get in and out of. Drivers included Jackie Oliver, Terry Sanger, and Derek Bell, and Jem Marsh of course. The sales brochure for the Fastback included options for 5 speed gearbox (Hewland), dry sump, 997cc (84 to 88 bhp) and 1148cc (102 to 104 bhp) full race engines, light alloy bellhousing, 72-litre fuel tank (for endurance racing), lightweight alloy oil cooler, and perspex windscreen (saving 15 lbs).

The successor Marcos coupé road cars were popular track/day cars, and several were raced in the BARC and BRSCC Modsports championships, including Jonathan Palmer taking the 1977 Modsport championship in a V6. Mark Hales also successfully raced a 1967 wooden chassis V6 in the Modsports class. The 1800 Volvo engined cars are accepted for historic racing under FIA Appendix K, where they are very competitive, and there are still wooden chassis Ford-engined cars being raced. The fact that the wooden chassis can take the stresses of racing for so many years shows what a successful design it was.

=== Mini Marcos ===
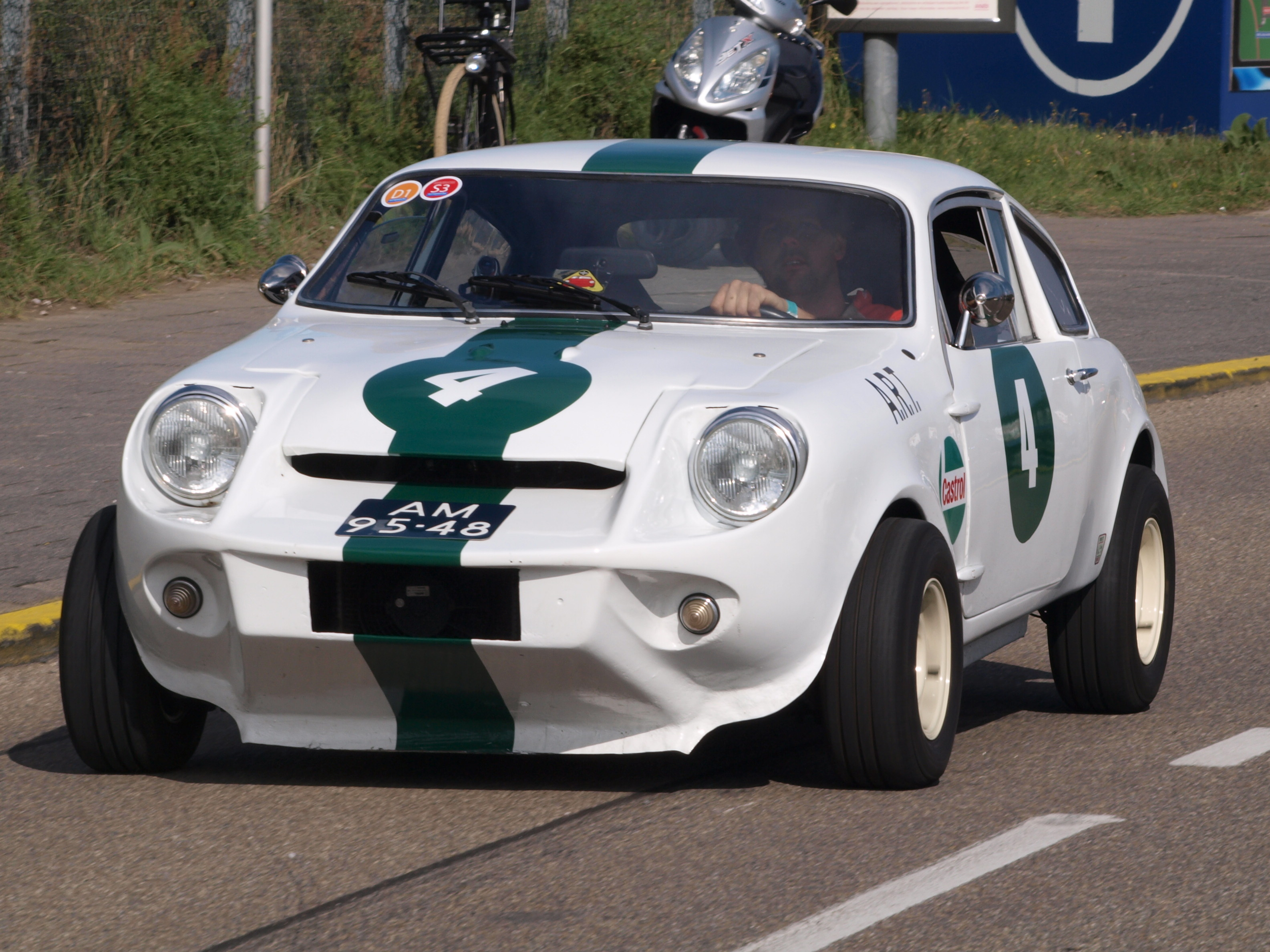
1967 Mini Marcos MkIII

The Mini Marcos is also a very successful car on the race track. It made its debut at a rain soaked Castle Combe race track on 25 September 1965. Driven by Geoff Mabbs, it lapped all but one car to win the BRSCC race by 81 seconds at an average of 76 mph.

In 1966 a French Mini Marcos, with Marcos support, was the only British car to complete the Le Mans 24-hour race. For the 1967 Le Mans, Marcos entered their own Mini-Marcos (drivers were Marsh and Chris Lawrence). The car was clocked at 141 mph on the Mulsanne Straight in the April test, but failed to finish the race because of an oil pump failure. The same car was more successful in the Kyalami 9-hour race in Nov 1967, when Marsh and Brian Raubenheimer finished 15th, it appeared again in the 1968 race but did not finish.

Mini Marcos cars were raced widely, especially as a budget endurance race car, but also in local championships in many countries including Modsports in the UK. Mini-Marcos was also the chosen car for the "First Ladies International Race Team" (FLIRT), which competed at events such as the Nurburgring 1000 km race in May 1967, where they retired, the Grand Premio del Mugello in July 1967, coming 37th, and the Nürburgring 500 km race in September 1967 where two cars were fielded with Jackie Bond-Smith coming in 21st and 4th in class, and Joey Cook retiring.

=== XP prototype ===
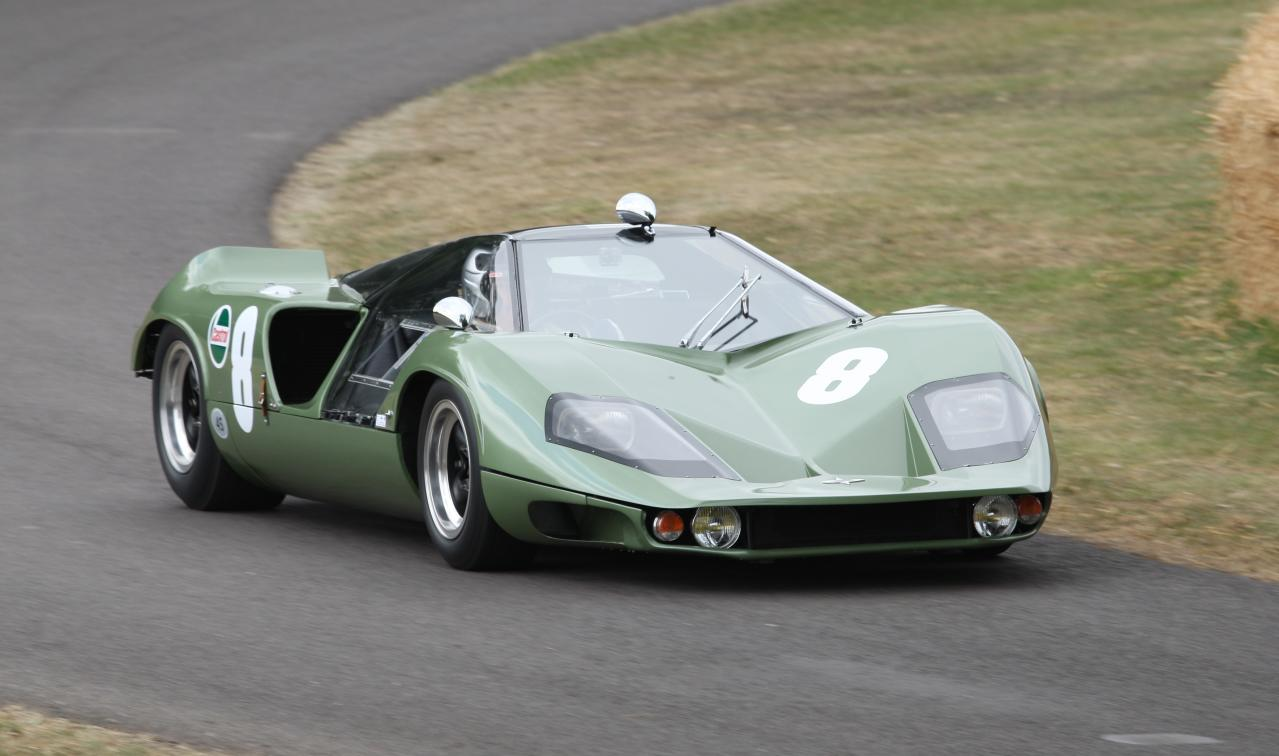
Marcos XP prototype

The XP prototype was intended for the 1968 Le Mans. It was assembled with a stressed plywood monocoque chassis and Cooper suspension, and powered by a Brabham Formula 1 engine, later replaced by a Buick 215 V8. Raced at Spa as a shakedown test, it was one of many cars that retired with electrical problems in heavy rain. This proved to be its only race. Le Mans was postponed that year and the XP went to America.

=== Second generation race cars ===
Marcos Mantis Marcorelly race cars, built by Cor Euser Racing.

After the company's resurrection in 1981 the emphasis was on road cars, although price lists for the early V8 cars included a competition specification for "circuit racing, hill climbs and sprints". Competition options include FIA-approved roll-over bar, limited-slip differential, rose-jointed suspension and full harnesses.

In October 1993 Marcos unveiled its new competition car and announced a return to GT racing, including Le Mans. Based on the Mantara, the cars were designated LM400, LM500 and LM600. After some successes in the British GT championship in 1994, Marcos won it in 1995, 1996 and 2000. Two cars also competed at Le Mans in 1995. Both suffered electrical faults, one retiring and the other (driven by David Leslie, François Migault, and Jem Marsh's son Chris) finishing second to last, having completed 114 laps fewer than the winning McLaren F1 GTR as its electrical problem stranded it on the Mulsanne Straight for two hours soon after the start.

The year 1998 saw the launch of the Dunlop-sponsored Mantis Challenge, a one-make race series for the coupé version of the Mantis road car with a dry-sump version of its 4.6-litre quad-cam Ford Modular V8 engine. Complete with FIA roll-cage the cars weighed 950 kg. Entries were few in 1998, and the cars were accepted for the Privilege GT series as GT2, and the French GT series as GT3, winning one of the races in France. In 1999 the field was stronger, and the Dutch Mantis Challenge was also strong, and some races combined both. The 1999 UK series was won by Edward Horner, and the Dutch series by Robert Knook.

A total of 38 Mantis Challenge cars were built, but the series did not continue beyond 1999, after the GT Championship introduced the GT3 class. Many are still raced, including in the British Endurance Championship (Britcar), and at least one has been converted for road use.

In 2000, the Marcos racing business was sold to longtime GT sponsor Eurotech, a Dutch engineering firm. By that time, all Marcos racing cars and road car chassis were built in the Netherlands, with road car assembly completed in Westbury by a much-reduced staff.

An LM600 driven by Cor Euser competed in the Dutch Supercar Challenge and won the GT Championship in 2002 and 2004, and again in 2009, the 50th anniversary of the founding of Marcos. Euser also has the license to manufacture racing cars, and has done so with a GT3-spec Marcos Mantis, and did the same in a modified Marcos Mantis, named the Marcorelly. He has raced both of these cars in the Benelux-based Supercar Challenge.

== See also ==
- Cosworth
- List of car manufacturers of the United Kingdom
