= Speedex =

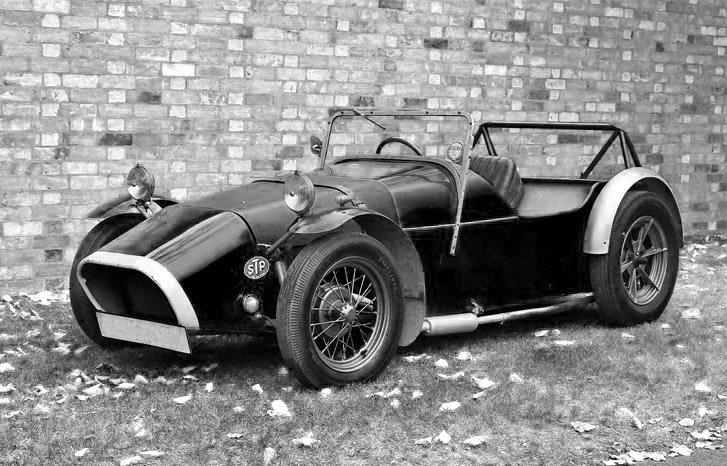
A 1960 Speedex 750 - the first sports car body produced by Speedex of Luton (1958-1962) for the 747cc Austin 7 chassis

Speedex Castings and Accessories Ltd. was a company manufacturing sports car bodies between 1958 and 1962 in Luton, Bedfordshire.

It was set up by Jem Marsh who left Firestone Tyres in 1958 to manage the Luton-based Sporting Motorists Agency which sold Dante tuning parts for Austin 7-based cars. He left in April 1958 to set up a similar company, SPEEDEX Castings and Accessories Ltd, in a former hat factory at 33 Jubilee Street.

The company moved on to larger premises in Windsor Street and produced the aluminium Speedex 750 body, followed by the glassfibre Silverstone and Sirocco GT Coupe.

Marsh went on to set up the Marcos Car Company with Frank Costin in 1962. The remaining Speedex bodies were purchased by Kew-based Cambridge Engineering who marketed the cars during 1962–3.
