= William John Storey =

British businessman (born 1978)

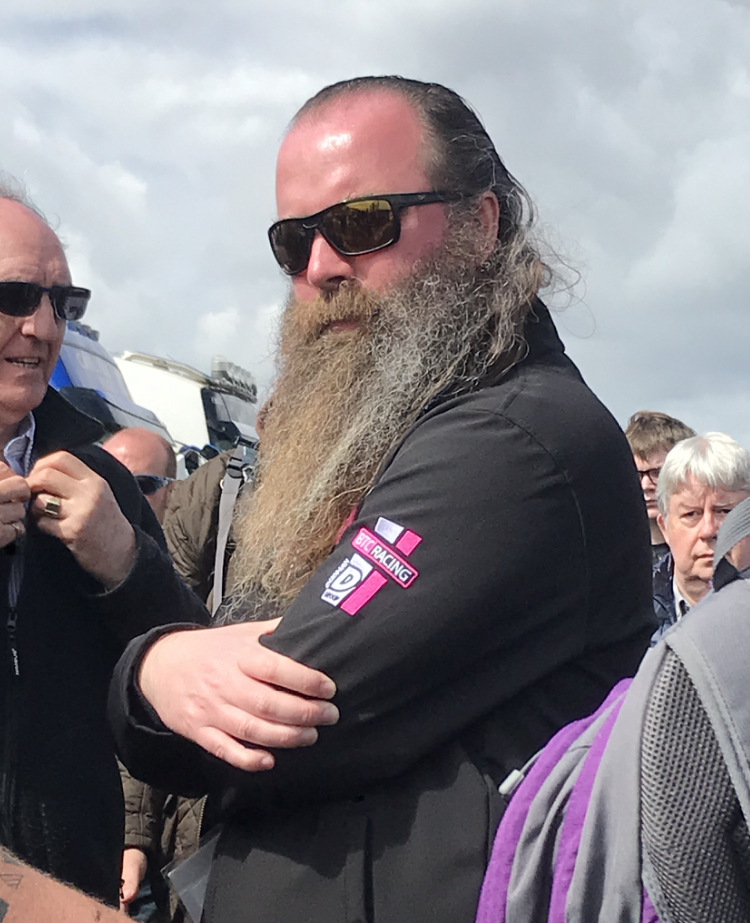
- Storey in 2022
- Born: September 13, 1978 (age 47); United Kingdom
- Occupations: Businessman, sports manager, professional gambler
- Known for: Energy drinks company and controversial bids for sports ownership

William John Storey (born 13 September 1978) is a British businessman, from Richmond on Thames. He has been involved with the carbonated drink brand Rich Energy since 2015.

== Early life and education ==
He was educated at the Russell School in Petersham and at the Tiffin Boys School in Kingston upon Thames, and later studied maths at the University of St Andrews.

== Career ==
He claims to have had short spells in the RAF (or possibly the ATC – accounts differ), as a professional footballer (for QPR reserves), as a professional gambler, and as a tobacco farmer in Zimbabwe.

He founded a sports management company, William Storey management, though some of his filings at Companies House describe him as a 'Computer Consultant', and he traded for many years as 'Tryfan Technologies', an IT consultancy.

Storey managed the boxer Frank Buglioni, with whom he founded a fashion company named Danieli Style, and was part of an ill-fated sponsorship deal between the Haas Formula 1 team and Rich Energy.

Storey led efforts to return the Rich Energy brand as a Formula 1 team sponsor in 2021 without success.

In July 2020, Storey said he was part of a consortium who were trying to purchase Sunderland Association Football Club, though the Roker Report said the claim did not "stack up", and former club CEO Jim Rodwell declined to comment upon his involvement.

In 2023, Storey made a bid for a third English football club Reading FC, however he later pulled out of the deal.

In 2025, Storey became CEO of Marcos Cars following a partnership with engineer Tony Brown. He later announced on social media that the company would be launching "a new, F1 inspired supercar" designed and built in Britain later that year. Despite this, Marcos Cars rights to the brand have been challenged by another company, Marcos Motor Company. Both companies claim to be the sole owner of the Marcos brand and the dispute is ongoing.
