= Jem Marsh =

Jeremy George Weston "Jem" Marsh (15 April 1930 – 2 March 2015) was a British engineer, motor manufacturer and race driver, born in Clifton, Bristol, England. He entered the motor industry through his company Speedex Castings and Accessories Ltd., based in Luton, that manufactured and sold tuning parts for Austin Sevens, based on Marsh's successful Speedex750 racing special. Marsh is perhaps best known as a co-founder of the sports-car manufacturer Marcos, the name being derived from a contraction of his and fellow founder Frank Costin's surnames. Founded in 1959, the company was continued by Jem's son Chris Marsh, until it was taken over by Canadian Tony Stellinga, and continued to produce automobiles until 2008 when it ceased production.
