= Marcos GT =

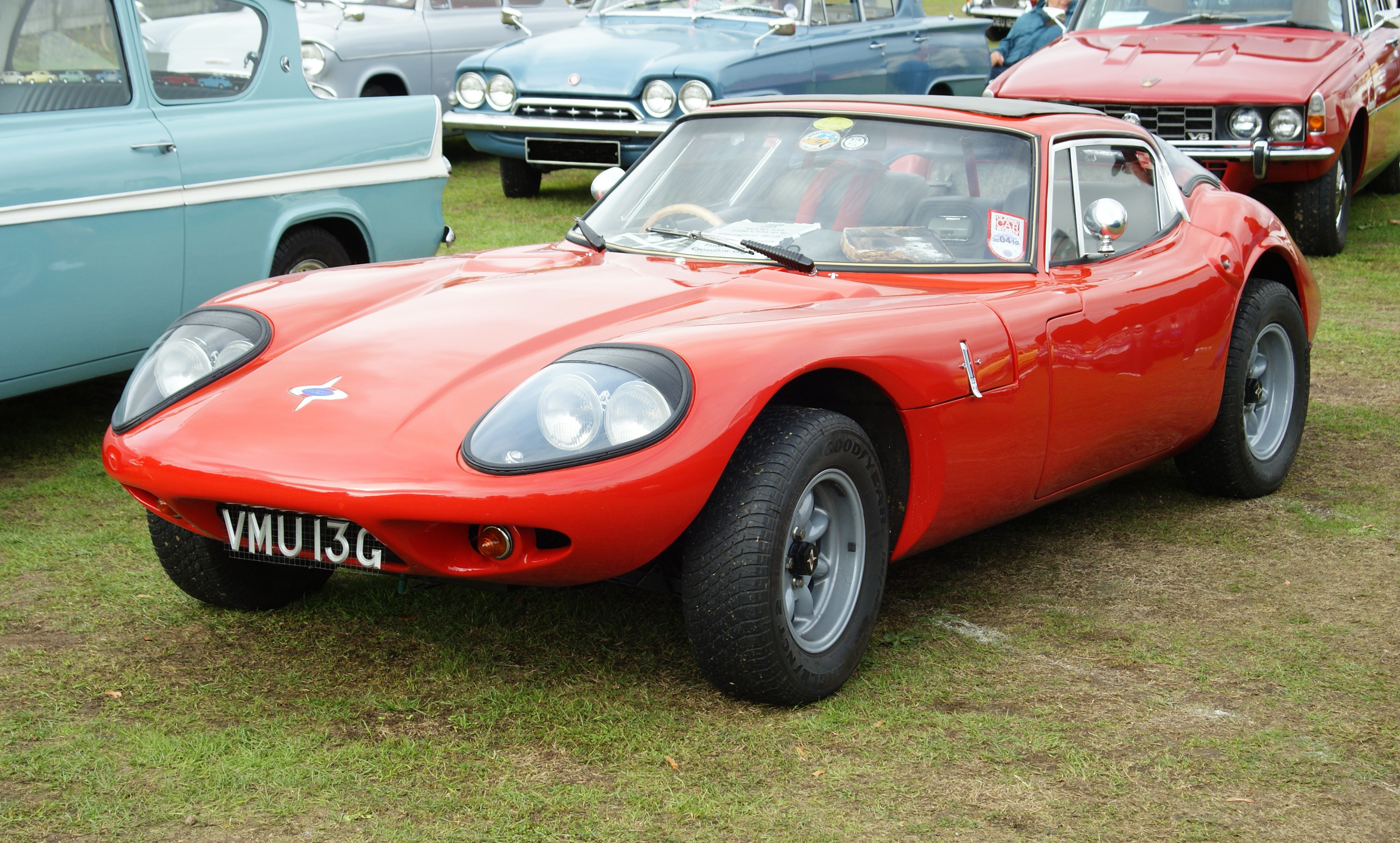

Overview
- Manufacturer: Marcos Engineering Ltd.
- Also called: Marcos 1500/1600/1650; Marcos 1800; Marcos 2-litre; Marcos 3-litre
- Production: 1964–1972; 1981–1990
- Designer: Dennis and Peter Adams

Body and chassis
- Class: Sports car
- Body style: 2-door coupé

Powertrain
- Engine: 1.5 L Ford Kent I4; 1.6 L Ford Crossflow I4; 1.65 L Ford Kent I4; 1.8 L Volvo B18 I4; 2.0 L Ford Essex V4; 2.5 L Triumph I6; 3.0 L Volvo B30 I6; 3.0 L Ford Essex V6
- Transmission: 4-speed manual

Dimensions
- Wheelbase: 89.5 in (2,273 mm)
- Length: 160.25 in (4,070 mm)
- Width: 62.5 in (1,588 mm)
- Height: 42.5 in (1,080 mm)
- Curb weight: ca 1,800 lb (820 kg), four-cylinder models; ca 2,000 lb (910 kg), six-cylinder models

Chronology
- Successor: Marcos Mantula

The Marcos GT is the name used by the British firm of Marcos Engineering Ltd for all of their cars until the introduction of the Mantis in 1970. Most commonly, the name is used to describe the very low coupé designed by brothers Dennis and Peter Adams.

The car was first introduced as the Marcos 1800 in 1964, with a wooden chassis and a Volvo P1800 engine. Later models had a steel chassis and commonly Ford engines although others were also available. Most Marcos GT's were factory built cars until 1972, but some were supplied as kit cars, especially after the 3 litre Volvo engined cars were returned from the USA.

The car was out of production from 1972 until 1981, when small scale component car production recommenced. The original GT continued to be built until 1989 or 1990, being developed into its altered Mantula form. This was further developed into more powerful and aggressively-styled designs, culminating in the 1994 LM600 (which competed in the 1995 Le Mans 24-hour race).

As was the intent with most Marcos products, the GT series saw much competition use. The original 1800 and other 1960s and 1970s Marcos are still competitive in both FIA and HSCC (UK) historic racing series.

== Marcos 1800 GT ==
In 1964 the glassfibre-bodied Marcos 1800 GT was introduced, using the cast-iron four-cylinder Volvo 1778 cc B18 unit with overdrive gearbox and De Dion rear axle. It was a sensation when first shown at the 1964 Racing Car Show. This was to be the design that would become familiar to sports car enthusiasts for more than 30 years, even though the original plywood chassis would later be replaced by a steel chassis and the futuristic scalloped dashboard also vanished after a few years. The plywood chassis was glued together from 386 separate pieces and was not only light and strong, but also required a minimum up front investment to construct. The extremely low Marcos required a nearly supine driving position and fixed seats, mounted lower than the floor of the car. In return, the entire pedal set could be moved fore and aft with a knob on the dashboard. If this proved not to be enough Marcos also offered optional booster pillows. This setup, with the fixed seats, remained until the end of Marcos production in late 2007. The original Marcos 1800 had a two-spoke steering wheel and a novel dash with a prominent centre console, a rather expensive design which did not survive onto the Ford-engined cars. The entire nose portion, of a long and tapered design, was hinged at the front and was held down by latches behind the front wheel wells.

The Volvo engine has 96 hp (72 kW), enough for a 116 mph (187 km/h) top speed and a 0-60 mph time of 8.2 seconds. Some sources claim 108 hp (81 kW) SAE. Successful in competition, the rather expensive 1800 sold very slowly, and after the first 33 cars the de Dion rear suspension was replaced by a live Ford axle. The price was dropped from £1500 to £1340, but it was not enough to make the car profitable. Cars were stockpiling in 1966, and after 106 (or 99) had been built, the 1800 was replaced by the Ford-engined 1500.

Normally fitted with a four-speed manual transmission, a five-speed was also available and allowed for a higher top speed. According to some sources, some of the last cars built had a 2-litre Volvo B20 engine, as did some of the racing versions. The 1800 is the only Marcos that is eligible for historic racing and as such is currently much more valuable than later models.

=== Ford four-cylinder models ===
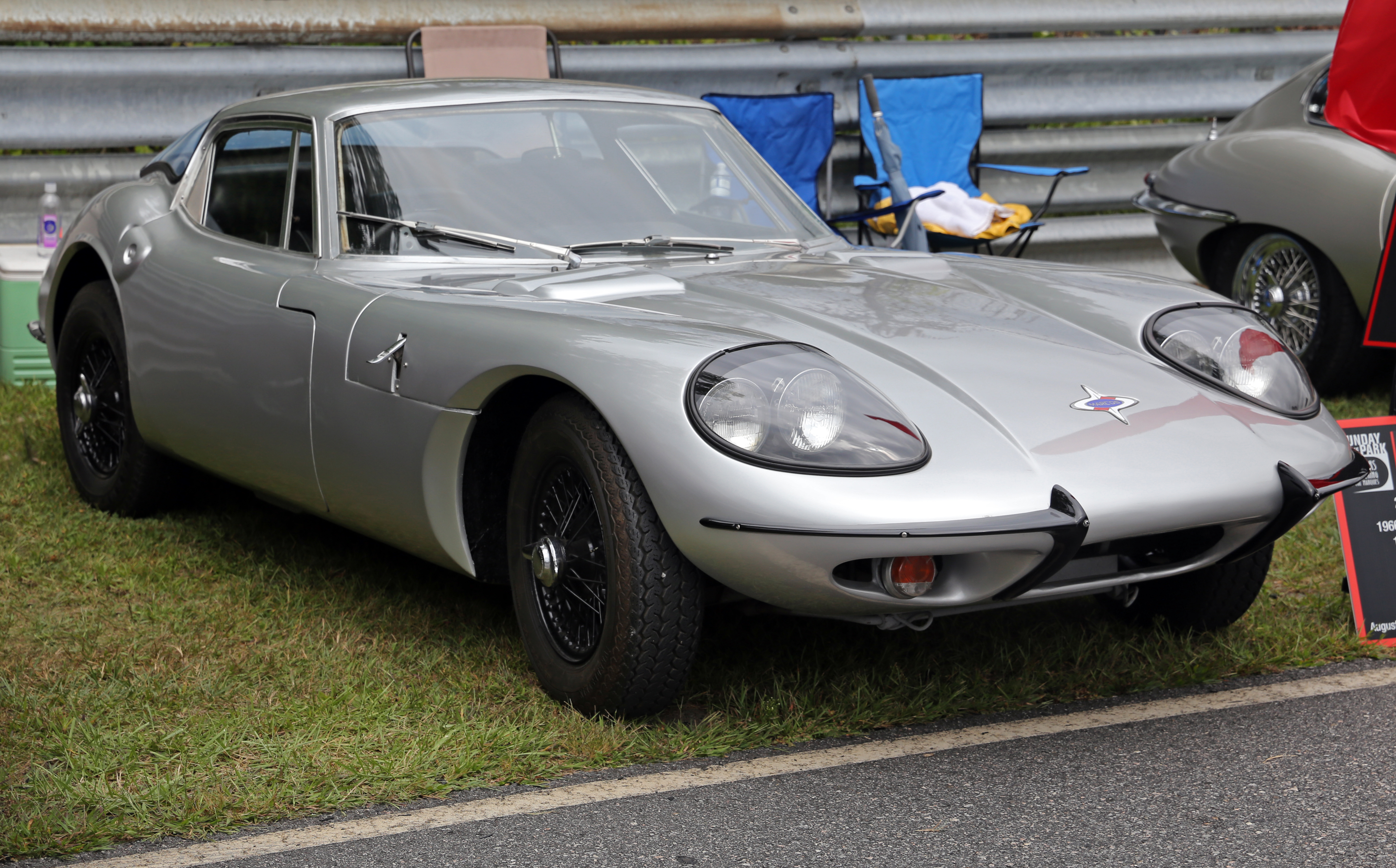
1966 Marcos 1500GT, still with the early doorhandle design

In 1966 the GT was changed to a pushrod inline-four Ford Kent engine of 1500 cc, in order to lower costs as the 1800 had been rather too expensive to market. The complex dash was also replaced with a flat polished wood unit, which was soon downgraded further to a mass-produced "wood-effect" one. Power and performance were both down on the 1800, but sales increased considerably. To hide the fact that a common Ford engine was used, Marsh replaced the rocker covers with Marcos ones and switched from Weber to Stromberg carburettors.

An overbored Lawrencetune 1650 cc version was made available in 1967 (32 built) to ameliorate the power shortage, for the Marcos 1650 GT. The 1650 also had bigger disc brakes and a standard Webasto sunroof, but proved somewhat less than reliable. It and the 1500 were both replaced by Ford's new Crossflow four not much later, in late 1967. The 1600 proved to be the most popular model yet, with 192 cars built until early 1969. Weight was 740 kg (1,631 lb) and disc brakes up front were standard, although power assist was an optional extra. Production ended in October 1969 as the new steel chassis was not well suited for the crossflow engine. A new model, the 2 litre, appeared at the January 1969 London Show with the engine changed to the Ford Essex V4 engine (3006E) from the Ford Corsair - while a V6 engine had already appeared at the top of the line-up in 1968. Also in 1969 (June), the plywood chassis was gradually replaced by a square section steel one, which shortened production time and saved on cost. These steel framed cars required a lower sill panel and have reshaped rear bumpers, as well as some subtle interior differences. The wooden chassis had also begun to meet a certain amount of resistance from buyers. There seem to have been no V4-engined wooden cars made, although there is a few months overlap between the introduction dates.

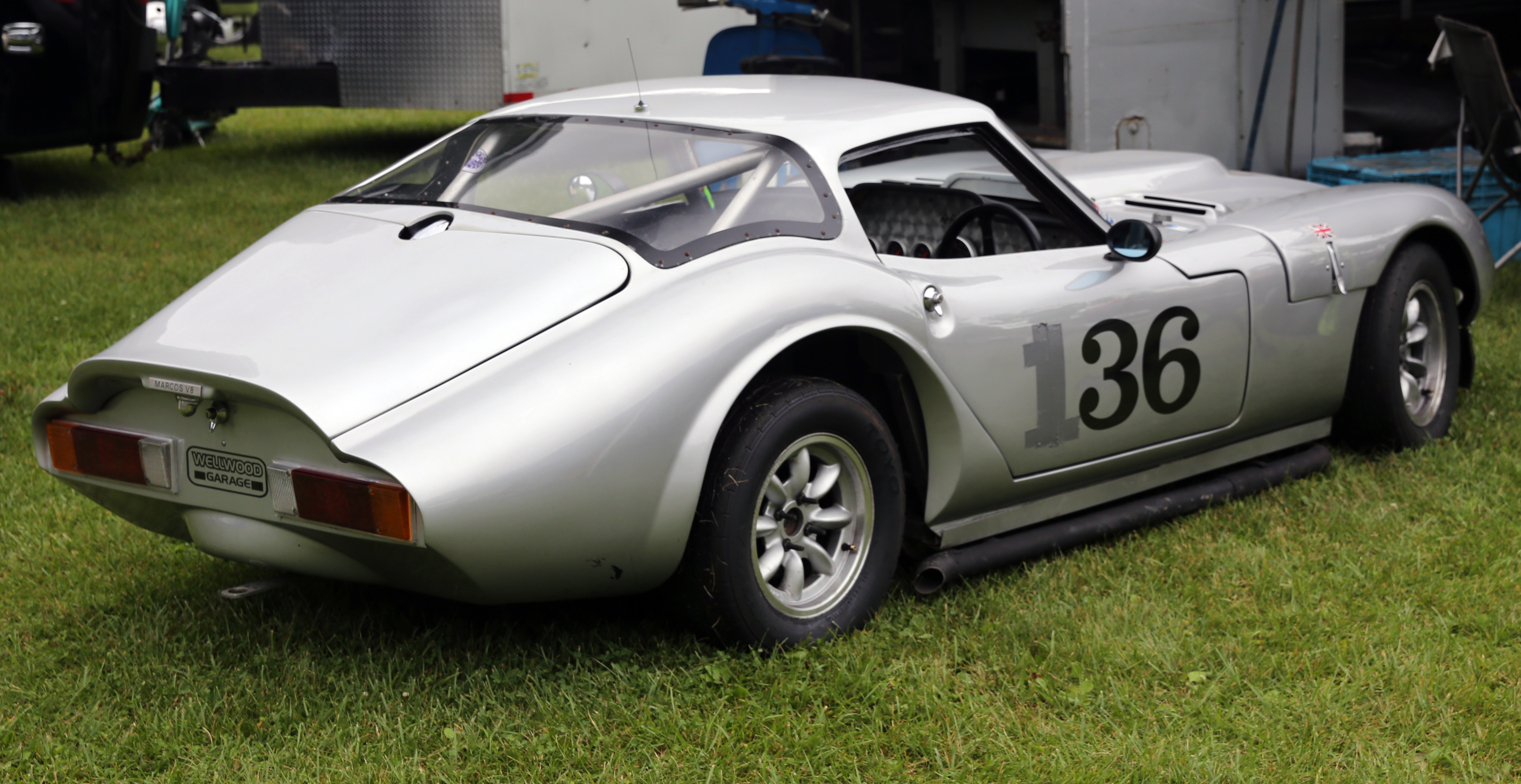
The distinct rear of a 1967 Marcos 1600, modified for competition (USA)

The V4 received most of the same standard and optional equipment (except the overdrive) and the same central bonnet bulge as did the V6 models; very few of the Marcos 2 litres still have their V4 engines, as a V6 swap is a rather quick job and makes for a much faster car than the original's 85 hp (63 kW). Some period sources mention 88 PS (65 kW; 87 hp) DIN and 104 PS (76 kW; 103 hp) SAE. Not exactly a success story, 78 2 litres were most likely built, although numbers as low as 40 have also been mentioned.

Power for the 1500 is also 85 hp (63 kW), with the fragile Lawrencetune model having 120 hp (89 kW). The 1600 Crossflow produces about 100 hp (75 kW), thanks to a number of official Ford Performance Center parts. As a side note, six steel-chassied Marcos 1600 (with the Mark 2 "A711M" Crossflow engines) were built in late 1971 and early 1972. Built to provide a low-priced entry level version, these were rather spartan, with stripped down interiors, no bumpers, steel wheels, and no headlight covers.

=== Six-cylinder models ===
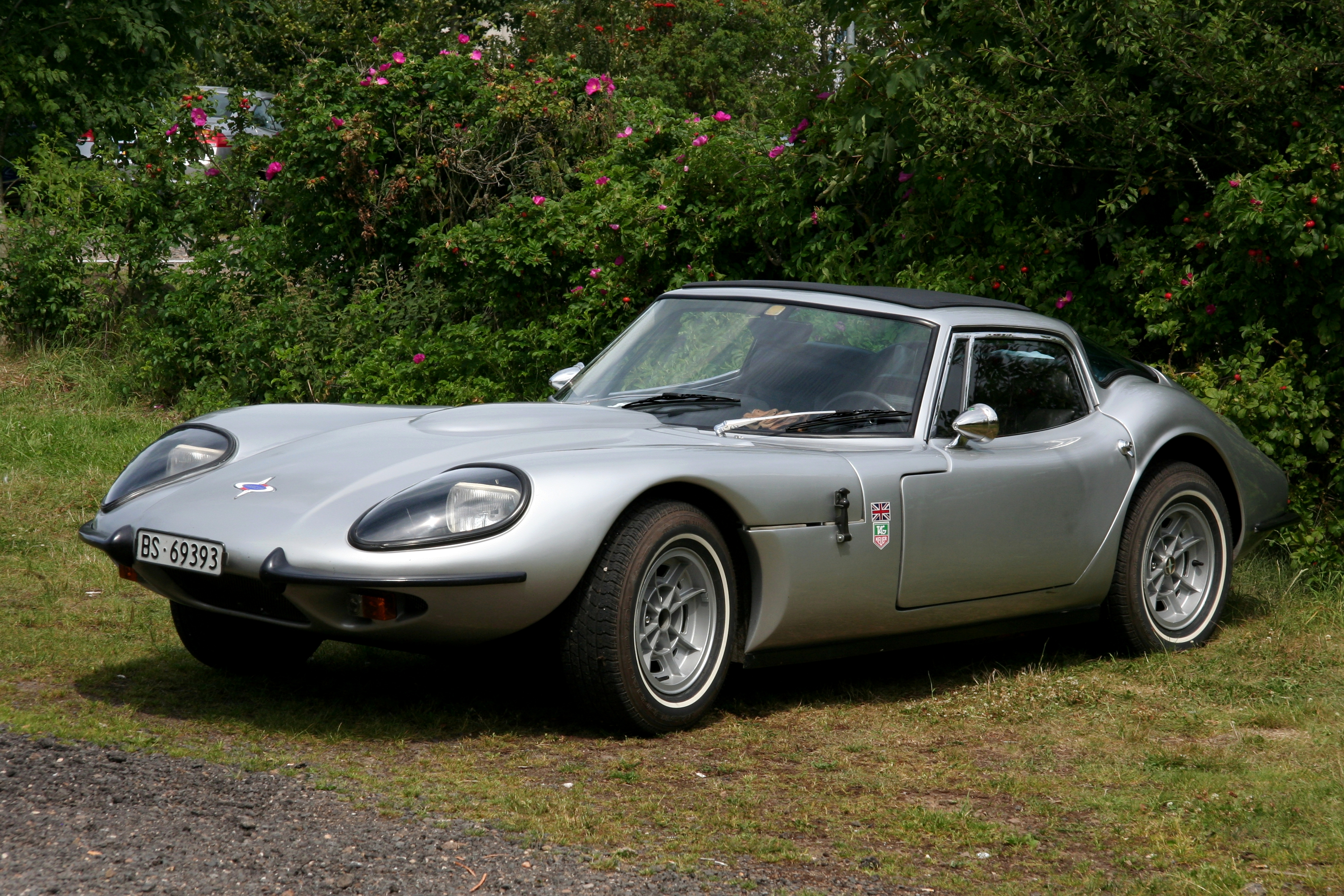
Circa 1970 Marcos 3 litre (Ford V6-engined), with Viva headlamps

New at the October 1968 London Show was the more powerful Marcos 3 litre. Fitted with the single-carb Ford Essex V6 engine (3012E) and transmission from the Ford Zodiac, production beginning in January 1969. Max power is 140 bhp (104 kW) and aside from the badging, this car is most easily recognized by the large, central bonnet bulge necessary to clear the larger engine. The 3 litre has a four-speed manual with a Laycock-de-Normanville Overdrive for the third and fourth gears fitted. In December 1969 a twin-carburetted 3-litre Volvo B30 straight-six became available (initially only for the US), and in 1971 eleven or twelve cars were fitted with the 150 bhp (112 kW) Triumph 2.5-litre straight-six (engines intended for the ill-fated Mantis). These were called the Marcos 2½ litre. As the bonnet was a close fit over the various larger engines, this resulted in a corresponding variation in the bonnet design as regards changes designed to clear engine air intakes, often the only external sign of the type of engine fitted. All inline-sixes required a rather angular bulge right of center on the bonnet to clear the carburettors. Around this time, some V6 cars begun sporting single rectangular headlights (not on US-market cars), borrowed from the Vauxhall Viva HB.

Later in 1969 the six-cylinder cars, as with their four-cylinder counterparts, received the new steel chassis. Either 100 or 119 of the wood-chassied V6 cars were built. The Ford V6 version achieved over 120 mph (190 km/h) on test and the Volvo-engined model was not far behind it, but the heavy cast-iron engines increased nose-heaviness in comparison to the four-cylinder variants. With US sales going strong, Marcos production was up to three per week and they had to invest in a bigger space in 1969.

Cars for the North Americas market had Volvo's inline-six cylinder, 3 litre engines with a standard Borg-Warner Type 35 automatic transmissions. They sit on tubular steel space frames, have a higher ride height, and no headlight covers - all of this was in order to get US road certification. Air conditioning was also listed as an option by New York-based importers Marcos International Inc. Delays and problems with the federalized cars were beginning to mount. In 1970, 27 exported cars were impounded by US Customs for supposedly not meeting federal law, causing Marcos to withdraw entirely from the US market. Together with the development costs of the Mantis and the introduction of VAT on kit cars on the horizon, Marcos had to close its doors (for the first time).

About sixty US market cars were built, some of which were brought back after the US market dried up in 1970 and converted to RHD for sale in the home market. Production of the Volvo 3 litre continued for the rest of the world, with these cars fitted with a four-speed manual transmission. Either 80 or 172 of the Volvo I6-engined Marcos were built until early 1972, with the final one destined to become the last Marcos built for the next ten years. After Marcos had run out of money the company was sold to Hebron & Medlock Bath Engineering in mid-1971. They themselves had to call in the receivers only six months later. The Rob Walker Garage Group bought the factory only to sell off everything, including some finished cars such as all six Mark 2 1600s built. Jem Marsh bought up spares and other parts at the liquidation sale and proceeded to run a company servicing existing Marcos, until he resumed production of Marcos kits in 1981.

=== Chassis ===
The Marcos GT was designed around Jem Marsh, who was 6 feet 4 inches (1.93 m) tall, so while the car is extremely low and sometimes awkward to enter, it can still accommodate surprisingly tall drivers. Earlier cars have a Triumph Herald front suspension; later on a Ford MacPherson setup was used. Although with a wooden chassis, the front suspension was mounted in a steel subframe. The first 33 Marcos (some say the first 52) have a de Dion rear suspension; later cars use a more conventional and cheaper live axle of Ford provenance. An independent rear suspension was introduced for the Marcos Mantula in 1986.

== Return of the GT ==
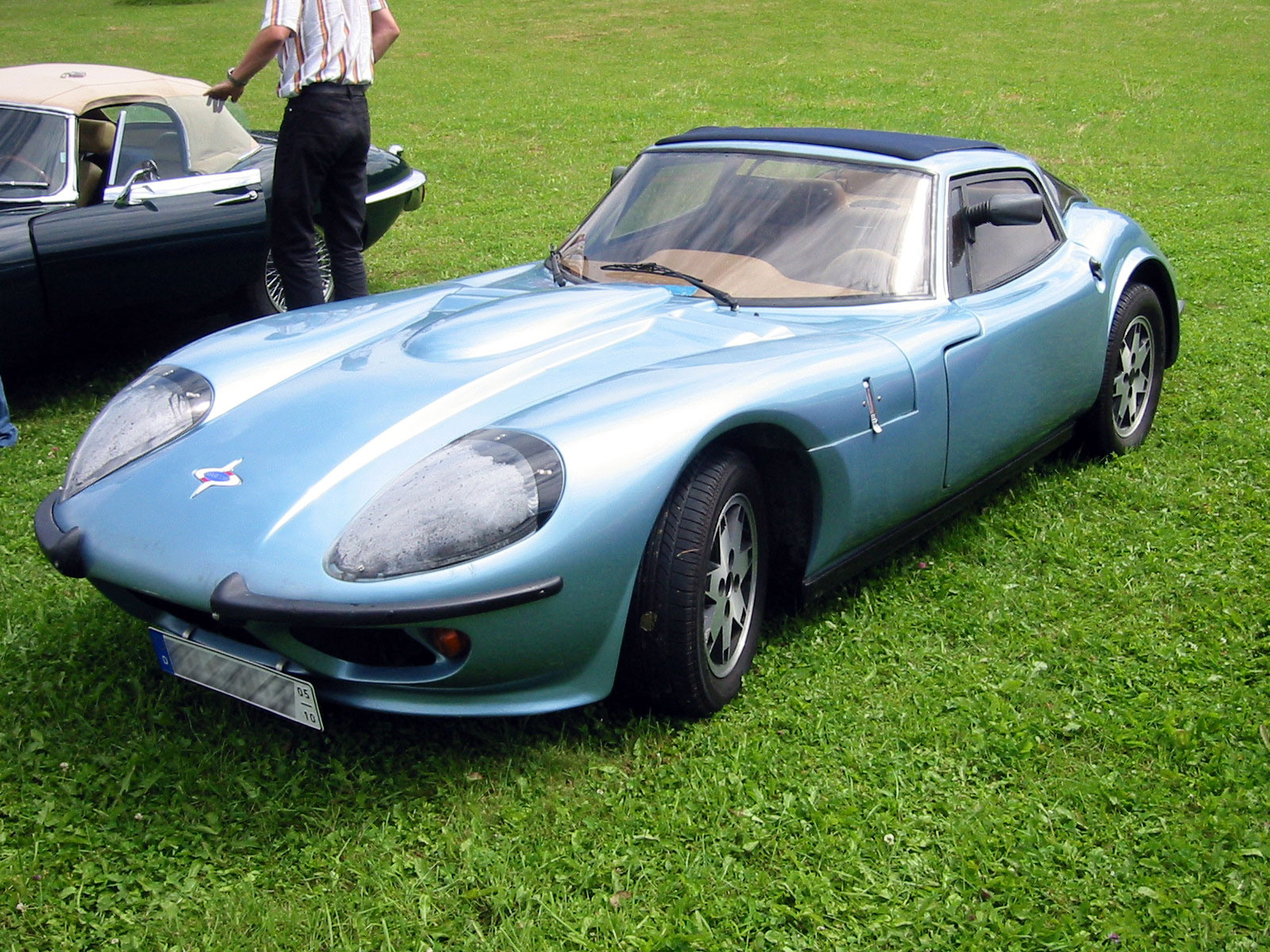
A 1984–1989 Marcos GT with the 2.8 litre Ford V6

Jem Marsh resurrected the Marcos brand in 1981 (having bought the moulds in 1976), offering the previous GT cars as kits only. The focus on racing cars had gone by now, not returning for another thirteen years with the LM series. The kit was offered in four different stages of completion.

Engine options again included Ford's 3.0 Essex V6, 2.0 litre V4, and 1600 Crossflow. New were the 2.3 or 2.8 litre Cologne V6 and the 2.0 litre Pinto inline-four. Taking advantage of the existing design of the rare 2½ litre model, Triumph's 2.0 and 2.5 litre straight-sixes were also possible options.

In 1983 a Rover V8-engined version was introduced, called the Mantula. This lighter and more powerful model was also available fully built up. In 1984 the Marcos GT saw a minor change, when a front spoiler was added to minimize high speed lift. About 130 Marcos Coupé kits were sold up to 1990, when Marcos decided to focus on the fully assembled Mantula and succeeding models. The Mantula Spyder's bodywork was never available as part of the GT kit range.

== Works cited ==
- "Happy 50th Marcos: The History of Marcos Cars" (PDF). Total Kit Car Magazine. UK. November–December 2009.
- Heseltine, Richard (2001). Specialist Sports Cars: The Good, the Bad and the Ugly of a Very British Breed. Haynes Publishing. ISBN 1-85960-690-3.
- Lawrence, Mike (1991). A to Z of Sports Cars. Bideford, Devon: Bay View Books. ISBN 1-870979-81-8.
