= Whyte Bikes =

British bicycle company

- Formerly: ATB Sales
- Type: Private
- Industry: Bicycle
- Founded: 1987; 39 years ago (Brand established in 1999)
- Founder: Jon Whyte
- Headquarters: Hastings, East Sussex, United Kingdom
- Products: Bicycle and Related Components
- Owner: Causeway Capital Partners
- Website: whytebikes.com

Whyte is a British bicycle company established in 1987 as ATB Sales, the brand was established in 1999 by Jon Whyte. The bicycles are manufactured for Whyte in Taiwan. and then distributed to shops in the UK and Europe and the rest of the world.

Whyte's first bike back in 1999 was a full suspension machine and had a girder fork with twin wishbones, with a main frame made of two halves welded down the middle, and used Fox shocks for both fork and swingarm. The prototype's appearance was likened to Preston the robot dog of Wallace and Gromit fame, which later gave the production bike its name, the PRST-1.

== History ==
The brand was established in 1999 by Jon Whyte, who had previously helped to develop aerodynamics and suspension systems for Benetton Formula, most notably the 1994 Formula One title winning B194.

He later joined ATB Sales Ltd as chief designer and helped to develop the full suspension system for Marin, ATB's then UK distributor. This helped Paul Lasenby to win the national championship in 1996, the first for a full-suspension bike. The suspension system later became the Whyte Integrated Fork System.

By 2002, the company sold its 1000th bike. Whyte would leave after 11 years to set up his consultancy business in 2006; ATB retained the name rights to the Whyte brand. In 2019, Whyte won a court case against British drinks company Rich Energy, regarding the potential theft of their stag logo.

In November 2023, Whyte announced a rebranding along with the launch of a new range of electric bikes, including the E-Lyte lightweight mountain bike and a new line of hybrid bikes called the RHeO series. in February 2024 Whyte announced their new CEO and chairman as Nikki Haywes, formally of Cannondale bikes.

On 20 October 2025, Cairngorm Capital announced that it had completed the sale of the UK firm to growth investor Causeway Capital Partners.

== Products ==
As of 2021 the range comprises Children/Youth, Commuter, Gravel, Road, XC, Trail, and Enduro ranges, with E-bike versions in several of these categories. The RD7 range is a road bike but with disc brakes and a more relaxed design. A common frame is used on all models: the wheel set, forks, group set and brakes are changed as the price increases. Whyte also have their own line in accessories.
