= Rich Energy =

British energy drink company

- Company type: Private limited company
- Industry: Energy drink
- Founded: 2015; 11 years ago
- Founder: William Storey
- Area served: United Kingdom
- Key people: William Storey (Director, founder); Zoran Terzic (director)
- Products: Rich Energy
- Website: richenergy.com

Rich Energy was a British beverage brand that was founded in 2015 by William Storey and an anonymous Austrian scientist. The energy drink project began in 2009 with the development of the product, and the UK distribution company was founded six years later. Information about Rich Energy and its energy drink is very limited. Due to this, the company has been the subject of controversy regarding the existence of its product.

On 16 July 2019, Rich Energy announced that they had renamed their company "Lightning Volt Ltd.", and on 19 July 2019 a new company was incorporated under the name "Rich Energy Limited". Information filed at Companies House also revealed that William Storey and Serbian colleague Zoran Terzic had apparently resigned as directors from the newly renamed Lightning Volt Ltd., before being reappointed on 29 August 2019. Storey stated that he had "sold his stake in the legal entity of Rich Energy". Matthew Kell was appointed as a new director of the company after Storey's apparent exit. In August 2019, Storey bought back shares from Kell to retake a majority shareholding in the company. Lightning Volt Limited was declared insolvent on 27 October 2020, following a petition by a creditor, and a liquidator was appointed on 13 January 2021.

== Flavours ==
- Original (since 2015)
- Sugar Free (since 2021)

== Sponsorship ==
=== Motorsports ===
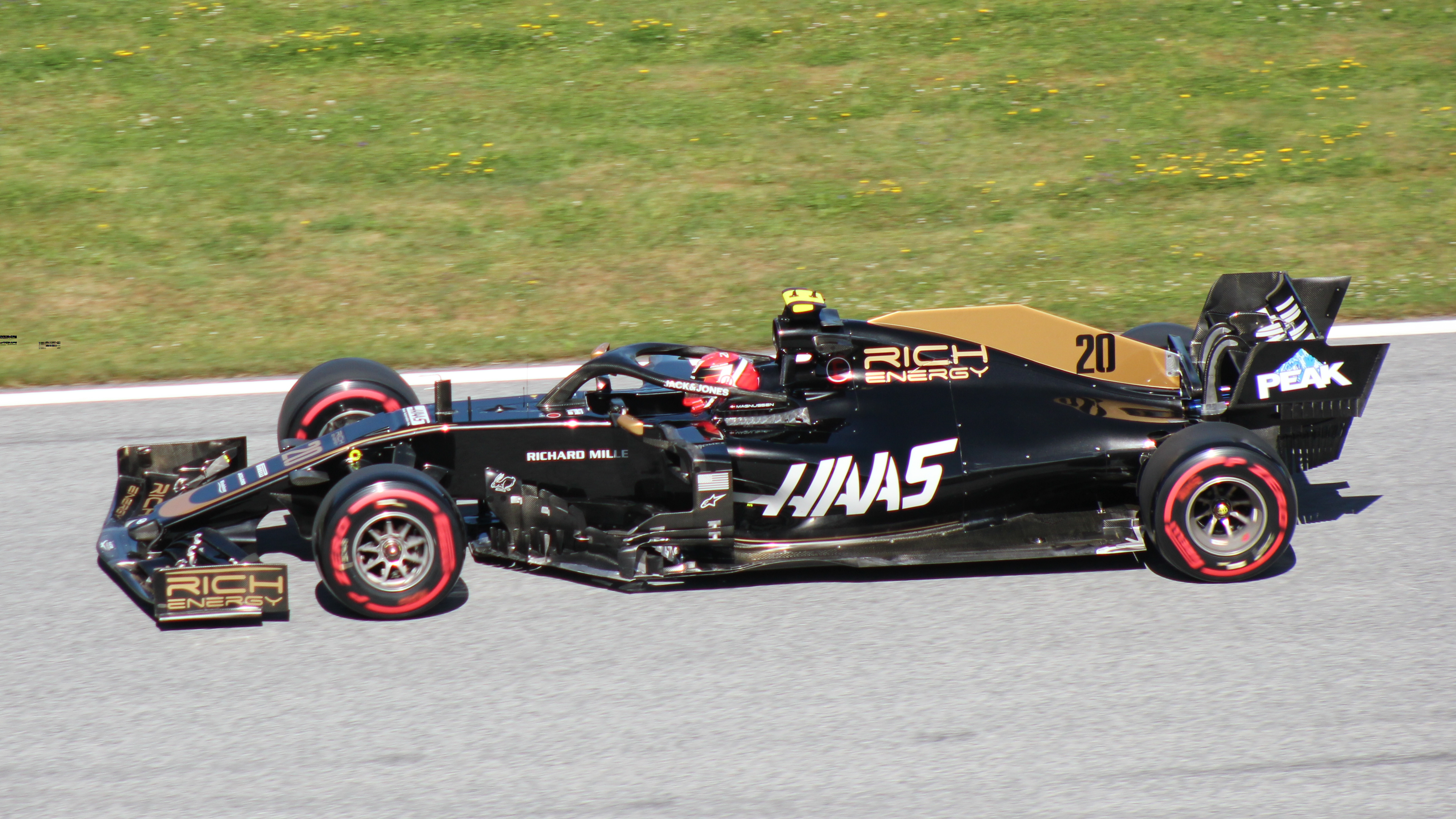
Kevin Magnussen driving the Rich Energy-sponsored VF-19 at the 2019 Austrian Grand Prix

In 2017 Rich Energy sponsored British Superbike team True Heroes Racing.

In October 2018, Rich Energy became the title sponsor of Haas F1 Team as Rich Energy Haas F1 Team. Originally, the company intended to get a sponsorship deal with Williams. However, it was unclear whether the team rejected the offer or Rich Energy simply changed their mind. Rich Energy also attempted to purchase Force India for £100 million which had been put into administration by the High Court at the time. Storey claimed the deal had been finalised but this was denied by the Indian racing team.

In 2019 Rich Energy also sponsored British Indy Lights driver Toby Sowery and Australian GT drivers Rio Nugara and David Russell.

In February 2020, Rich Energy was announced as the new title sponsor of British Superbike Championship race entrant OMG Racing.

In July 2020, Rich Energy was announced as a sponsor of BTCC driver Michael Crees, who drives for BTC Racing.

In 2021, Rich Energy branding could be seen on the BTCC Vauxhall Astras of Jason Plato and Daniel Lloyd.

In April 2022, Storey did a deal for Rich Energy to become title sponsor of BTC Racing in the British Touring Car Championship.

=== Boxing ===
Rich Energy has sponsored Jay Carrigan-McFarlane, Lucas Browne, Jim Walker, Phil Campion and Gennady Golovkin.

=== Other ===
In 2016 British yachtsman Alex Thomson signed a sponsorship deal with Rich Energy.

In 2021-2022 Rich Energy sponsored Jamaican Bobsleigh and Skeleton Federation.

== Controversies ==
=== Company legitimacy ===
Controversies regarding Rich Energy's credibility began to spread in the days following Rich Energy's attempt to purchase the Force India Formula One team. Internet forums and social media posts questioned the legitimacy of the company. Then-CEO William Storey had denied the claims multiple times, stating that Rich Energy had produced 90 million drink cans, and that it was backed by £4 billion worth of endorsements despite there being no financial information corroborating this claim and the company's financial documentation was available through Companies House.

=== Copyright infringement ===
In May 2019, Rich Energy Ltd. was involved in a court case with Whyte Bikes due to the stag-antler logo used by Rich Energy bearing too close a resemblance to the logo used by the bicycle company. Rich Energy lost the case, with the judge declaring that Rich Energy had misled the court by claiming they did not previously know about Whyte Bikes.

On 18 July 2019, the Rich Energy Twitter account leaked alleged court documents, suggesting that the company, as well as William Storey, would be facing legal proceedings by Austrian energy drink company Red Bull GmbH in relation to Rich Energy's advertising slogan because Storey was regularly using Red Bull's own advertising slogans against them.

=== Sponsorship with Haas F1 Team ===
On 10 July 2019, the Rich Energy Twitter account announced that the company had ended its sponsorship deal with Haas F1 Team due to the team's poor performance and Formula One Group's politics and attitude. The announcement from the energy drink brand came as "a surprise" to Guenther Steiner, Haas's team principal at the time. The following day, the company's shareholders disowned the announcement, stating that the apparent termination of the sponsorship deal was "the rogue actions of one individual". The company also stated that it was "in the process of removing the individual from all executive responsibilities". William Storey later accused his company's shareholders of "mounting a coup" in relation to the Haas F1 Team sponsorship.

On 9 September 2019, a day after the Italian Grand Prix, Haas announced the termination of the deal with Rich Energy with immediate effect.
