= Marcos Mantara =

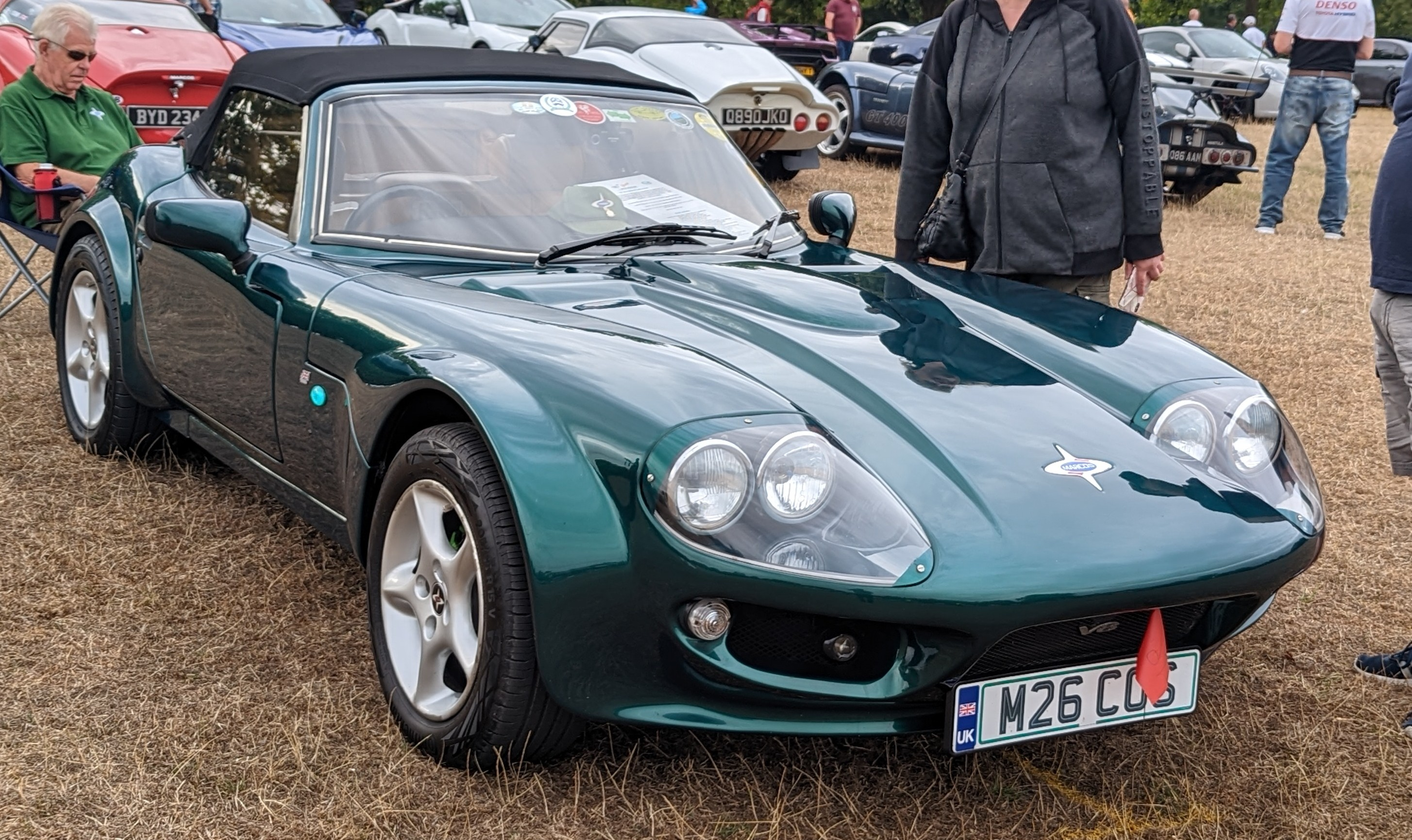

Overview
- Manufacturer: Marcos Engineering
- Production: 1992–1999
- Designer: Dennis Adams, Peter Adams

Body and chassis
- Layout: FR layout

Powertrain
- Engine: 3.9 L Rover V8; 4.6 L Rover V8

Chronology
- Successor: Marcos Mantaray

The Marcos Mantara is a sports car, designed, developed and built by British manufacturer Marcos, introduced in 1992, and produced until 1999.

== Background and history ==
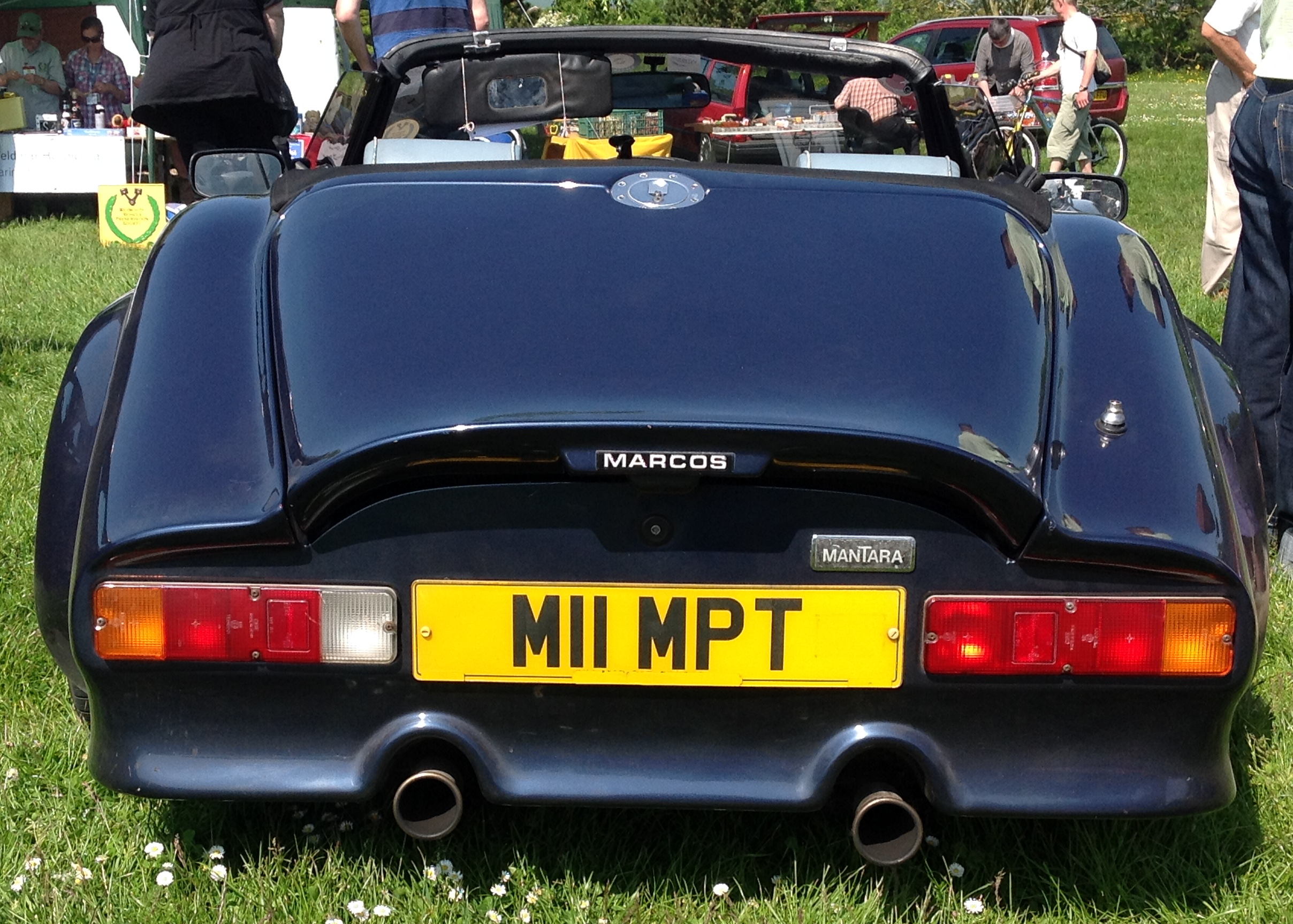
1994/95 Marcos Mantara Spyder rear

In 1992 Marcos left the kit car business, all cars from this point onwards being factory built, and launched the Marcos Mantara which was sold through dealers in limited numbers. The main difference between the Mantara and the Mantula was the adoption of MacPherson strut front suspension in place of the Triumph suspension and associated trunnions. This change resulted in a wider front track, different bonnet, and flared front arches. The rear wheel arches and rear lights were also changed to give the car a more modern appearance. Power steering was also available for the first time. The Mantara was powered as standard by a 3.9-litre fuel-injected Rover V8 or a 4.6-litre Rover V8 as an optional alternative. The 3.9-litre version produces 190 hp (142 kW) at 4750 rpm and 234 lb⋅ft (317 N⋅m) of torque at 3200 rpm, while the 4.7-litre version produces 230 hp (172 kW). Marcos claimed a 0-60 mph time of 5.4 seconds and top speed of 140 mph (225 km/h) for the 3.9-litre version.

Early 1993 onward models shared more parts with the previous generations, such as the tail lights and fuel filler cap and side indicators. Whilst from c. 1996 onwards the Ford Mondeo rear light cluster and side repeaters were used, as well as the flush aero style fuel filler cap.

The Marcos GTS was a version of the Mantara powered by the 2-litre Rover Tomcat engine, on request of the Italian distributor Martes Spider Cars. The top version was the 200 bhp (149 kW; 203 PS) turbo version. The GTS version of the Mantara had a slightly different bonnet incorporating much smoother lines, flared-in headlamps, and a deeper spoiler, which was used on the later Mantaray model. A handful of late Mantara V8s were produced with the same bonnet as the 2.0 litre GTS.
