= List of Lotus vehicles =

The British automobile manufacturer Lotus Cars, currently a subsidiary of Geely, has produced a number of race and production cars since its inception in 1948.

== Current production vehicles ==
Image	Name	Designation	Type	Produced Since	Predecessor
	Emeya	133	electric Liftback	2024	
	Eletre / For Me	132	electric and plug-in hybrid SUV	2023	
	Emira	131	sports car	2022	Elise; Exige; Evora

== Former production vehicles ==
Image	Name	Designation	Type	Introduced	Ended	Predecessor	Successor
	Evija	130	electric sports car	2021	2024		
	3-Eleven	123	speedster	2015	2018	2-Eleven	
	2-Eleven	123	speedster	2007	2011	340R	3-Eleven
	Evora	122	grand tourer	2009	2021	Excel	Emira
	Europa S	121	sports car	2006	2010	Esprit	Exige
	340R	111	speedster	2000	2000		2-Eleven
	Exige	111	sports car, roadster	2000	2021	Europa S	Emira
	Elise	111	roadster	1996	2021	Elan S2	Emira
	Elan	100	roadster	1989	1995		Elise
	Excel	89	grand tourer	1982	1992	Eclat	Evora
	Esprit	79	supercar	1976	2004	Europa	Europa S
	Eclat	76	grand tourer	1975	1982		Excel
	Elite	75	shooting brake	1974	1982	Elan +2	
	Elan +2	50	grand tourer	1967	1975		Elite
	Europa	46	sports car	1966	1975		Esprit
	Elan	26	sports car, roadster	1962	1973	Elite	Esprit
	Elite	14	sports car	1958	1963		Elan
	Seven	7	roadster	1957	1973	Mark Six	
	Mark VI	6	roadster	1952	1957		Seven

== Concept cars ==
Image	Name	Type	Produced	First Showcased
	Elan	sports car	2010	Paris Motor Show
	Elise	roadster	2010	Paris Motor Show
	Elite	grand tourer	2010	Paris Motor Show
	Esprit	supercar	2010	Paris Motor Show
	Eterne	sport sedan	2010	Paris Motor Show
	Ethos	hatchback	2010	Paris Motor Show
	APX	crossover	2006	Geneva Motor Show
	Enjoy	speedster	2003	Geneva Motor Show
	Extreme	sports car	2000	British International Motor Show
	Emotion	supercar	1991	North American International Auto Show
	M200	speedster	1991	International Motor Show Germany
	Etna	grand tourer	1984	British International Motor Show
	X100	roadster	1984	British International Motor Show

== Other vehicles with Lotus development ==
Image	Marque	Model	Introduced	Ended	Lotus contribution
	Baojun	730	2014	2021	suspension tuning
	Hyundai	Genesis	2013	2016	handling adjustment
	Spyker	B6 Venator	2013	2013	tuned Toyota engine
	Infiniti	Emerg-e	2012	2012	base vehicle (Evora)
	Hennessey	Venom GT	2011	2017	base vehicle (Exige)
	Jaguar	C-X75	2010	2013	engine tuning
	Dodge	Circuit	2009	2009	base vehicle (Europa S)
	Kia	Soul	2008	2014	suspension tuning (UK model)
	Tesla	Roadster	2008	2012	base vehicle (Elise)
	Melkus	RS2000	2008	2012	base vehicle (Elise)
	Rinspeed	sQuba	2008	2008	base vehicle (Elise)
	Nissan	GT-R	2007	2025	suspension tuning handling adjustment
	Volkswagen	GX3	2006	2006	chassis development
	Aston Martin	DB9	2004	2016	chassis development
	Mahindra	Scorpio	2002		suspension tuning
	Opel Vauxhall	Speedster/VX220	2000	2005	base vehicle (Elise)
	Proton	Satria GTi	1998	2005	handling adjustment
	Dodge Chrysler	Spirit R/T	1991	1995	engine development
	Chevrolet	Corvette ZR-1	1990	1995	engine development handling adjustment
	Isuzu	Piazza	1990	1993	chassis development suspension tuning
	Opel Vauxhall	Carlton/Omega	1990	1992	chassis development handling adjustment
	Volvo	480	1986	1995	suspension tuning handling adjustment
	Sinclair	C5	1985	1985	chassis development
	Toyota	MR2	1984	1989	suspension tuning handling adjustment
	DMC	DeLorean	1981	1983	chassis development
	Talbot	Sunbeam	1979	1981	chassis development engine development
	Toyota	Supra	1978	1985	suspension tuning
	Ford	Cortina	1963	1970	engine development suspension tuning

== See also ==
- Lotus Cars, the manufacturer of these models
- Lotus F1 and Team Lotus, motorsport ventures of the company
