= Lotus 907 =

Inline-four automobile engine

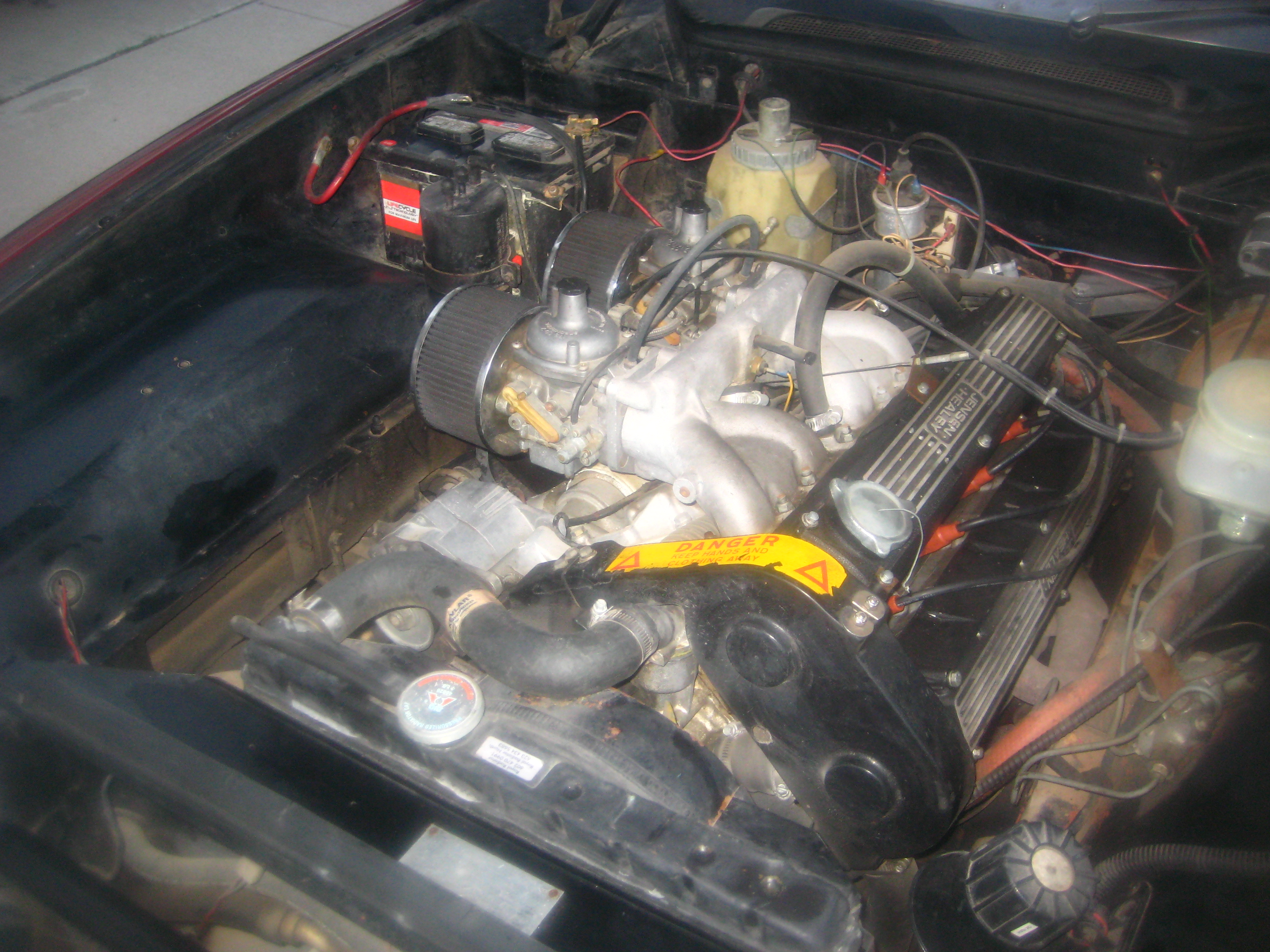
1974 Jensen-Healey engine with dual side-draft Zenith-Stromberg carburettors for North America

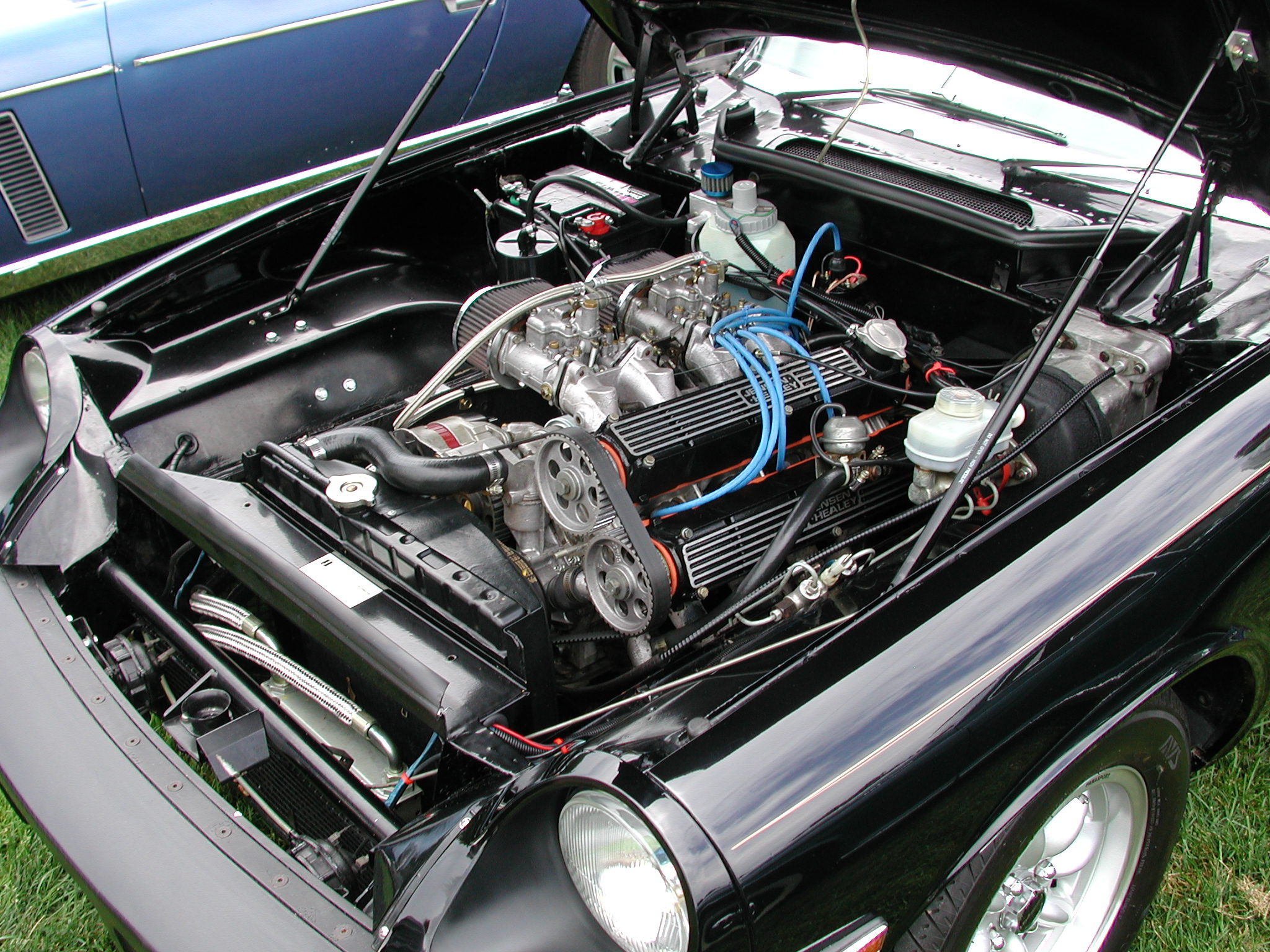
The Lotus Type 907 twin-cam engine fitted with European-spec Dell'Orto carburettors in a Jensen-Healey

The Lotus 907 is an inline-4 automobile engine designed and manufactured by Lotus Cars. With a displacement of 1,973 cubic centimetres (120.4 cu in), the engine is constructed entirely from aluminium alloy and features dual overhead camshafts (DOHC) along with a 16-valve configuration.

The engine produced approximately 144 bhp (107 kW) in most markets when equipped with dual side-draft Dell'Orto carburettors. For vehicles destined for the United States market, the engine used Zenith-Stromberg carburettors to meet stricter emissions standards.

The Lotus 907 was colloquially referred to as "The Torqueless Wonder" due to its relatively low torque output at lower engine speeds, contrasted with its strong high-end horsepower performance.

== History ==
The Lotus 907 was the first production variant of the Lotus 900 series engine. It was first installed in the Jensen-Healey, making it the initial production car to feature the 907 engine.

When Vauxhall unveiled its new slant-four engine at the 1967 Earls Court Motor Show, the bore centres of the engine were identical to those proposed by Lotus. Colin Chapman, founder of Lotus, negotiated a deal with Vauxhall to purchase their cast-iron engine blocks. This arrangement allowed Lotus to accelerate the development of its own aluminium cylinder head, leading to the creation of the 907 engine.

== Applications ==
- Type 75 Lotus Elite
- Type 76 Lotus Eclat
- Type 79 Series 1 and early Series 2 Lotus Esprit
- 1972–1976 Jensen-Healey
- Type 62 Lotus Europa
