= Lotus M90 =

Overview
- Manufacturer: Lotus Cars
- Also called: X100
- Production: 1
- Model years: 1984
- Designer: Oliver Winterbottom

Body and chassis
- Class: Concept Roadster
- Body style: 2-door Convertible
- Layout: Front-engine, rear-wheel-drive

Powertrain
- Engine: 1.6L 123 bhp (92 kW) 4-cylinder Toyota 4A-GEU
- Transmission: Toyota-built 5-speed T50 Manual

The Lotus M90 (sometimes referred to as the Lotus X100) is a concept car that was developed by Lotus using many Toyota parts. Rumors were circulated that it was the initial design for the MKI MR2, but, though sharing an engine, it bears very little resemblance to the mid-engine roadster. The project was the last one overseen by Lotus founder Colin Chapman before his death in 1982.

In 1981, Oliver Winterbottom was brought back to Lotus, after a stint developing the Tasmin for TVR, to design a new car to complement the Excel and the Esprit and bring some profitability to the lineup. The new car was to resurrect the Elan name which had not been used since 1975 and, like the Excel, make use of the company's close relationship with Toyota to use already well-engineered suspension and engine components. Initial designs were a coupé that didn't get much of an enthusiastic response from the board of the company. The project stalled when company founder Colin Chapman died in 1982, as Lotus found itself in financial trouble. David Wickens of British Car Auctions ended up taking a controlling interest in the company, and the project was started up again, but renamed to the X100 (the Elan later being known as the M100). After redesigning the car to be a convertible the go ahead was given in 1984 to make a single prototype. It was built to a high level of finish, but by that time most of the company's engineers were concentrating on the new front-wheel-drive Elan, and the prototype was warehoused at the company's factory. In 1998 it was auctioned off along with several other rare Lotus cars, and sold to a private collector, and shipped to the United States.

The M90 makes use of a front-mounted 1.6L 123 bhp (92 kW) 4-cylinder Toyota engine, as well as a Toyota-built 5-speed transmission and final drive. The suspension uses the same setup as is found in the Lotus Excel. The instrument cluster is from an Opel Monza and the radiator is from an Austin Allegro. The rear lights are borrowed from the Aston Martin Lagonda and the indicators are from the Ford Fiesta. The body is made of fibreglass and the roof is lowered in two pieces. The top is removed separately and fits in the boot, to create a 'targa' style roof, and the rear portion folds down like a typical convertible.

This car is featured in a book released in June 2017 by Oliver Winterbottom titled A Life in Car Design, in which the author provides insight into the design and construction of the M90 along with photographs and related documentation.
