= Top Gear series 15 =

Top Gear
- Series 15
- Promotional poster
- Starring: Jeremy Clarkson; Richard Hammond; James May; The Stig
- No. of episodes: 6

Release
- Original network: BBC Two
- Original release: 27 June – 1 August 2010

Series chronology
- ← Previous; Series 14 Next → Series 16

Series 15 of Top Gear, a British motoring magazine and factual television programme, was broadcast in the United Kingdom on BBC Two and BBC HD during 2010, consisting of six episodes that were aired between 27 June and 1 August; the new series was promoted with a special trailer that made use of a clip published on YouTube. This series saw the replacement of the Chevrolet Lacetti by the Kia Cee'd as the Reasonably Priced Car.

This series' highlights included the creation of home-made motorhomes, the driving of a modified Toyota Hilux up to the active Eyjafjallajökull volcano during one of its eruptions, the testing of budget cars to see if they are suitable for track days, and the production of a tribute to the late Ayrton Senna. Two compilation episodes featuring the best moments from the fifteenth series, titled "Best of Top Gear", were aired on 8 and 15 August 2010.

== Episodes ==
No. overall	No. in series	Reviews	Features/challenges	Guest(s)	Original release date	UK viewers (millions)
120	1	Bentley Continental Supersports	Toyota Hilux Invincible up an Icelandic volcano • Farewell to the former reasonably priced car, the Chevrolet Lacetti • A history of the Reliant 3-wheeler: (Reliant Robin)	Nick Robinson • Al Murray • Peter Jones • Peta 23 from Essex • Johnny Vaughan • Bill Bailey • Louie Spence • Amy Williams • Haraldur Sigurðsson • Phil Oakey • Peter Stringfellow • Harry Gration • Dickie Bird	27 June 2010	5.60
Top Gear is back and the presenters are trying to be sensible. Of course, that's not the case when Clarkson goes to the North to try to drive a Reliant Robin from Sheffield to Rotherham, and rolling it over in the process, while on the track he road-tests the heavy Bentley Continental Supersports. Elsewhere, May heads to Iceland to see if can give glory to the Toyota Hilux used by the camera crew during the Polar Special, by modifying it for the task of driving close to the Eyjafjallajökull volcano as it erupts and collect a piece of lava, while Hammond retires the old reasonably priced car—the Chevrolet Lacetti—with a "Viking burial", before assisting Clarkson with a summer BBQ for the guests they have invited to the test track to set a lap in the new car—a Kia Cee'd.
121	2	Porsche 911 Sport Classic • Porsche Boxster Spyder	Find a £5,000 everyday second-hand sports saloon for track days: (Mercedes-Benz 190E 2.3-16 Cosworth • BMW M3 • Ford Sierra Sapphire RS Cosworth)	Alastair Campbell	4 July 2010	6.60 (Note: 6.00 million on BBC Two, 602,000 on BBC HD.)
The trio head to Germany to see which is the best second-hand four-door saloon for track days on a budget of £5,000—May chooses the Mercedes-Benz 190E 2.3-16 Cosworth, Hammond buys a BMW M3, and Clarkson purchases a Ford Sierra Sapphire RS Cosworth. Travelling from Berlin, the trio attempt to test their cars practicality and speed, before having a personal track day at the EuroSpeedway Lausitz to see who can make the best YouTube video and achieve the fastest lap with their car. Elsewhere, May tests out the Porsche 911 Sport Classic and the Porsche Boxster Spyder on the track, while former Director of Communications under Tony Blair, Alastair Campbell, is the latest star in the Kia Cee'd. Note: Due to time constraints, a segment of film for the episode's main feature was cut but made available online for viewing.
122	3	Chevrolet Camaro SS • Mercedes-Benz E63 AMG	Find the greatest four-door supercar: (Maserati Quattroporte GTS • Aston Martin Rapide • Porsche Panamera Turbo)	Rupert Grint • Rubens Barrichello	11 July 2010	4.58 (Note: 4.03 million on BBC Two, 549,000 on BBC HD.)
The boys attempt to see what is the best new four-door supercar—the rather good-looking Maserati Quattroporte GTS despite it being a little fiddly and complicated, the beautiful Aston Martin Rapide despite it being too expensive and the rather ugly Porsche Panamera Turbo. Starting in London, the presenters test out the cars, before stopping at a business park and letting the Stig see how fast they are on an improvised course. To fully decide which is best, the trio give them the ultimate test by chauffeuring members of a wedding party to the church and then to the reception, although the boys get a little distracted. Elsewhere, Hammond tests out two new muscles, the Mercedes-Benz E63 AMG and the fifth-generation Chevrolet Camaro, while British actor, Rupert Grint, is the latest star in the new reasonably priced car. Note: The 2010 World Cup final took place on BBC 1 and ITV at the same time as this episode of Top Gear was broadcast, hence the noticeable drop in viewing figures.
123	4	Audi R8 V10 Spyder • Porsche 911 Turbo Cabriolet	Building motorhomes: (Lotus Excel • Land Rover 110 • Citroën CX)	Andy García • Lauren McAvoy	18 July 2010	7.05 (Note: 6.47 million on BBC Two, 575,000 on BBC HD.)
The presenters make their campervan using a different car as the base—Hammond using a Land Rover 110 in his design, Clarkson making one out of a Citroën CX, and May designing his with a Lotus Excel—each complete with sleeping accommodations, cooking facilities and a toilet. To see whose is best, the trio take a motoring holiday to Cornwall, and soon find many faults with their designs as they engage in a few tests of practicality with each. Meanwhile, Clarkson is on the track to review the Audi R8 V10 Spyder and the Porsche 911 Turbo Cabriolet and puts them through an unusual test, while actor Andy García sees if he can set a fast lap in the Kia.
124	5	Volkswagen Touareg • Bugatti Veyron Super Sport	Volkswagen Touareg vs Swedish snowmobilers • Reach 258mph (415 km/h) in the Bugatti Veyron Super Sport • Commemorating racing driver Ayrton Senna, Lewis Hamilton drives Senna's 1988 F1 racing car.	Tom Cruise • Cameron Diaz	25 July 2010	7.48 (Note: 6.65 million on BBC Two, 827,000 on BBC HD.)
Hammond heads to Riksgränsen to try out the new Volkswagen Touareg, before using a customised one to race against two snowmobile racers. Meanwhile, May returns to the Ehra-Lessien test track with the Bugatti Veyron Super Sport, to see if it can reclaim the crown of the "Fastest Production Car in the World", while actors Cameron Diaz and Tom Cruise see who was faster in the Kia when they did a lap of the Test Track. Finally, Clarkson pays tribute to the late Ayrton Senna, finding out from the people who knew him best—Mika Häkkinen, Lewis Hamilton, Jarno Trulli, Martin Brundle, Fernando Alonso, Felipe Massa, Rubens Barrichello, David Coulthard, Mark Webber, Nigel Mansell, and Michael Schumacher—what he was like on and off the track, before Lewis Hamilton has a go at driving Senna's F1 car. Note: For licensing reasons regarding the use of F1 footage, all re-runs of the episode do not feature the 'Ayrton Senna Tribute' film, but instead they go straight to the closing credits following the 'Star in a Reasonably Priced Car' segment.
125	6	Ferrari 458 Italia	Old British roadsters for £5,000: (TVR S2 • Lotus Elan • Jensen-Healey)	Jeff Goldblum	1 August 2010	6.19 (Note: 5.81 million on BBC Two, 379,000 on BBC HD.)
Clarkson, Hammond and May feel that classic British sports cars are much better than European Hot Hatchbacks, so the producers task them with proving this correct by each buying one and testing them in a series of challenges—Clarkson seeks to prove his Jensen-Healey he bought will be good, May buys a TVR S2 to show the producers they were right, and Hammond purchases a Lotus M100 Elan to take on this task. On a journey to the sites of the factories where each car were built, the presenters each try to achieve a fast lap in their car, perform a 'safety test', see how waterproof their cars are, and visit a garden centre in Birmingham to find something to fit in their cars. Elsewhere, Clarkson reviews the new Ferrari 458 Italia on the track, while actor, Jeff Goldblum, is on the track to drive fast in the Kia Cee'd.

=== Best-of episodes ===
Total	No.	Title	Feature	Original air date	UK viewers (million)
S22	CE–1	"The Best of Top Gear: 2010 No.1"	Best Moments from Series 15 – Part 1	8 August 2010	3.56
A look back at some of the best moments from Series 15, including the race between a Volkswagen Touareg and some Snowmobilers, and Clarkson's drive to Rotherham in a Reliant Robin.
S23	CE–2	"The Best of Top Gear: 2010 No.2"	Best Moments from Series 15 – Part 2	15 August 2010	2.55
A second look back at the best moments from Series 15, including the search for the best four-door saloon, and May's attempt to drive close to an erupting volcano in Iceland.

== Criticism and controversy ==
The fifteenth series faced criticism after the broadcast of the fifth episode, when Clarkson joked during a "News" segment that he had been in cab the other day and truly seen a woman wearing a burka tripping up on a pavement, upon which he could see that under it she was wearing a "red g-string and stockings". Following the broadcast of the episode, the BBC received a number of complaints regarding the joke, with the singer Lily Allen writing on Twitter that the joke was "distasteful", while a Mediawatch spokesperson said that Clarkson "should learn to keep quiet".

However, in an article written for The Week, Antonia Bland defended the presenter's joke, saying that Clarkson had done nothing wrong and that Muslim women who wore a burka had the right to "choose to wear gorgeous lingerie in private", adding that the joke proved a good example of the dangers faced by male drivers trying to concentrate on the road during Summer.

== Notes ==
The viewing figures shown in the Episode Table above (with the exception of the first episode), are a combination of the figures from the BBC Two broadcast and the BBC HD broadcast.
