= Chrysler Sunbeam =

- Chrysler Sunbeam

Overview
- Manufacturer: Chrysler Europe (1977–1979); PSA (1979–1981)
- Also called: Talbot Sunbeam (1979–1981); Talbot-Simca Sunbeam; Talbot Sunbeam Lotus
- Production: 1977–1981
- Assembly: United Kingdom: Linwood

Body and chassis
- Class: Supermini (B)
- Body style: 3-door hatchback
- Layout: FR layout
- Related: Hillman Avenger

Powertrain
- Engine: 928 cc OHC I4; 1,295 cc OHV I4; 1,598 cc OHV I4; 2,172 cc 16V Lotus Type 911 I4
- Transmission: 4-speed manual

Dimensions
- Wheelbase: 2,413 mm (95.0 in)
- Length: 3,829 mm (150.7 in)
- Width: 1,603 mm (63.1 in)
- Height: 1,395 mm (54.9 in)
- Kerb weight: 818 kg (1,803 lb) - 960 kg (2,120 lb)

Chronology
- Predecessor: Hillman Avenger; Hillman Imp
- Successor: Talbot Samba

The Chrysler Sunbeam is a supermini car manufactured by Chrysler Europe at the former Rootes Group factory in Linwood, Scotland, from 1977 to 1981. After the takeover of Chrysler's European operations by PSA, the model was renamed Talbot Sunbeam and continued in production until 1981. A Talbot Sunbeam Lotus version was successful in rallying and won the World Rally Championship manufacturers' title for Talbot in 1981.

== Background ==
In the mid-1970s, Chrysler UK (formerly Rootes Group) was, like much of the British car industry, in financial trouble. Chrysler's Linwood facility was generating significant losses and falling demand had led to its car making capacity being greatly underutilised.

In 1975, the Ryder Report led to the effective nationalisation of one of Chrysler UK's major competitors, British Leyland. Chrysler management pressed the government for its own state aid package and threatened to close the company's UK operations if it did not receive financial support. The government agreed to a state grant reported at £55,000,000 to fund the development of a small car, which was to be developed in Chrysler's UK facilities and manufactured at the Linwood plant.

== Development ==
The development of the new car started in January 1976, under the codename Project R424. The technical side was the responsibility of the engineering team in Ryton, while the styling was the responsibility of Chrysler's Whitley design studio in Coventry, led by Roy Axe (who left the UK for Chrysler's headquarters in the US before the car was launched). Many constraints, such as a very tight schedule, low budget and the need to use as many British components as possible, led to the decision to use the rear-wheel drive Hillman Avenger as the base for the new vehicle, rather than the increasingly common front-wheel drive favoured by Chrysler's French subsidiary, Simca. The Sunbeam was, unlike the larger Horizon and Alpine models that were launched by Chrysler in the mid to late 1970s, never sold in France as a Simca. Although it was targeted at the supermini class, the Sunbeam's Avenger underpinnings meant that it was slightly larger than its intended rivals, potentially overlapping with Chrysler's own Horizon model. For this reason, the Sunbeam was only available with three-door bodywork, whereas the Horizon was only offered with five doors.

Basing the car on the Avenger's platform allowed for the car not only to use as many existing components as possible, but also to put it in production relatively quickly and cheaply. The Avenger's wheelbase was shortened by 3 inches (76 mm), and some modifications were made to accommodate the 928 cc Coventry Climax-derived engine, an enlarged version of the 875cc unit used in the rear-engined Hillman Imp. The car took its steering wheel and instrument pod from Chrysler's recently launched award-winning Simca 1307/Chrysler Alpine.

With the exception of the doors, which were shared with the two-door Avenger, the R424 was given an all-new body, styled very much in line with Chrysler's new, angular "international" style. This new design language was first seen on the 1975 Simca 1307/Chrysler Alpine, and later on the 1977 Simca/Chrysler Horizon (Project C2). Nevertheless, a constraint in the development process took its toll on the initial look of the car: as the C2's (Horizon's) headlamps were not available at the planned launch time of the R424, the smaller car received the lamps of the pre-facelift Hillman Avenger, which required the characteristic recessed mounting in the front fascia.

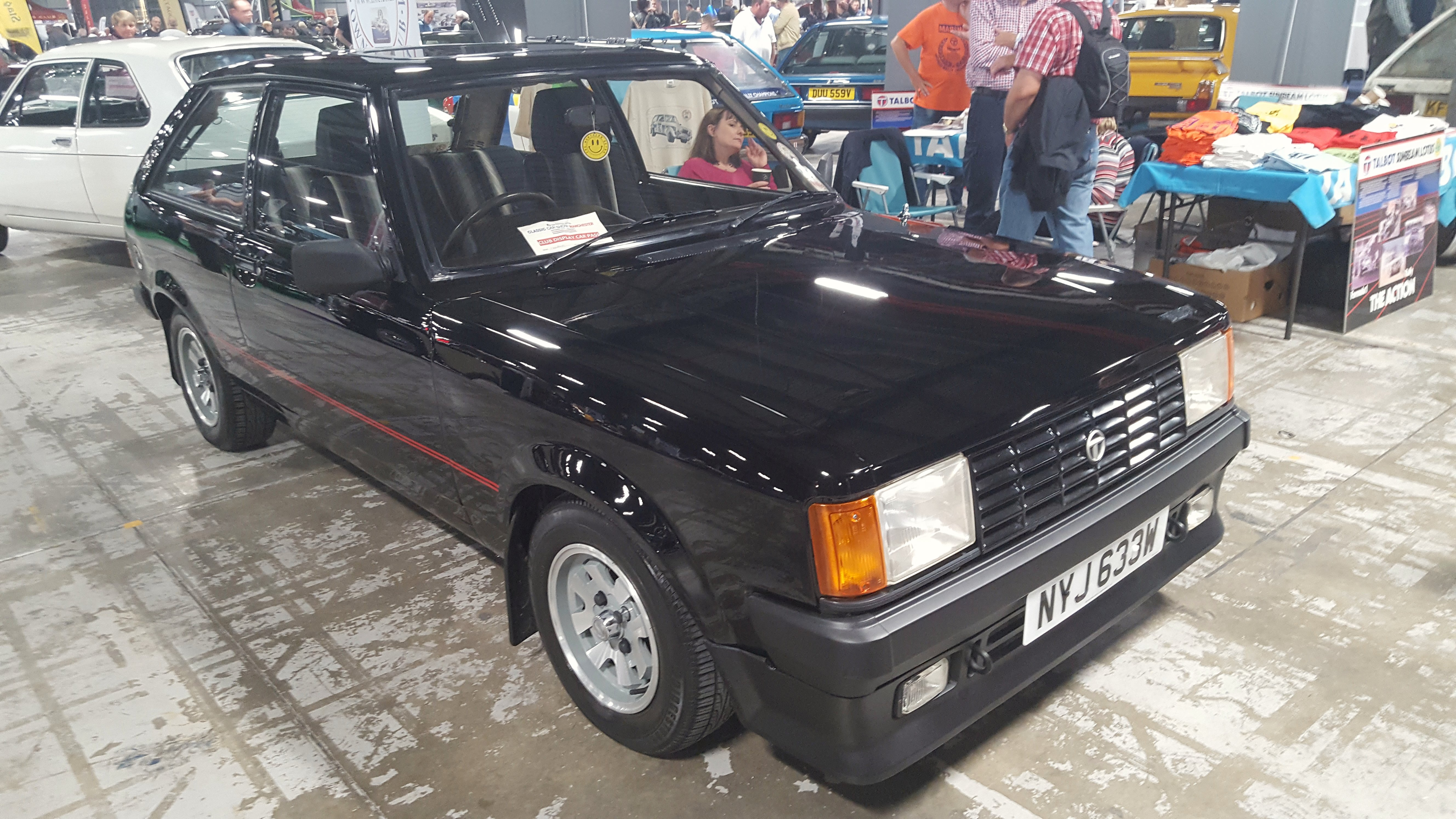
1981 Talbot Sunbeam 1.6 Ti - facelift model with flush headlamps

The Sunbeam was only available as a three-door hatchback. The hatch was constructed in a similar style to the Hillman Imp and consisted of a single piece of glass. This design necessitated a high rear sill. The high rear sill increased the car's structural rigidity, but offered restricted access when compared to its rivals. The Sunbeam's appeal may also have been hampered by the lack of alternative body styles. This was in contrast to the Sunbeam's main competitors in the UK, such as the Vauxhall Chevette.

Until the R424's launch, most Chrysler UK products were sold in export markets under the Sunbeam marque. By the mid-1970s Chrysler was striving to rationalise the number of brands in their European portfolio. The result was that when it appeared in showrooms the R424 would be sold as a Chrysler product. The Sunbeam brand was discontinued and the remaining Rootes Group models also rebranded as Chryslers in 1976.

Capacity	928–2,172 cc
Power	42–150 hp (31–112 kW)
Max. speed	128–200 km/h (80–124 mph)
Acceleration	0–62.5 mp/h: 22.2–8.3 seconds

== Launch ==
After a remarkably short development period of 19 months, the Chrysler Sunbeam was launched on 23 July 1977, to a positive reception by the British automotive press. On launch, the Sunbeam was offered in 0.9, 1.3 and 1.6 litre guises and three trim levels "LS", "GL" and the range topping "S". To reduce in-house competition, the more basic versions of the two-door Avengers were dropped at the same time in the UK market, and the Chrysler Horizon restricted to five-door form. The Sunbeam sold well, but was not a runaway success.

By 1978 Chrysler was still losing money in both Europe and the US. Faced with the possibility of complete bankruptcy, Chrysler decided to sell its European operations to PSA. In 1979, PSA announced all former Chrysler Europe products would be rebranded as Talbots. From August 1979, the Sunbeam gained Talbot badging but retained a Chrysler Pentastar logo until 1981.

== Sunbeam Ti and Sunbeam Lotus ==
Talbot Sunbeam Lotus in typical black and silver

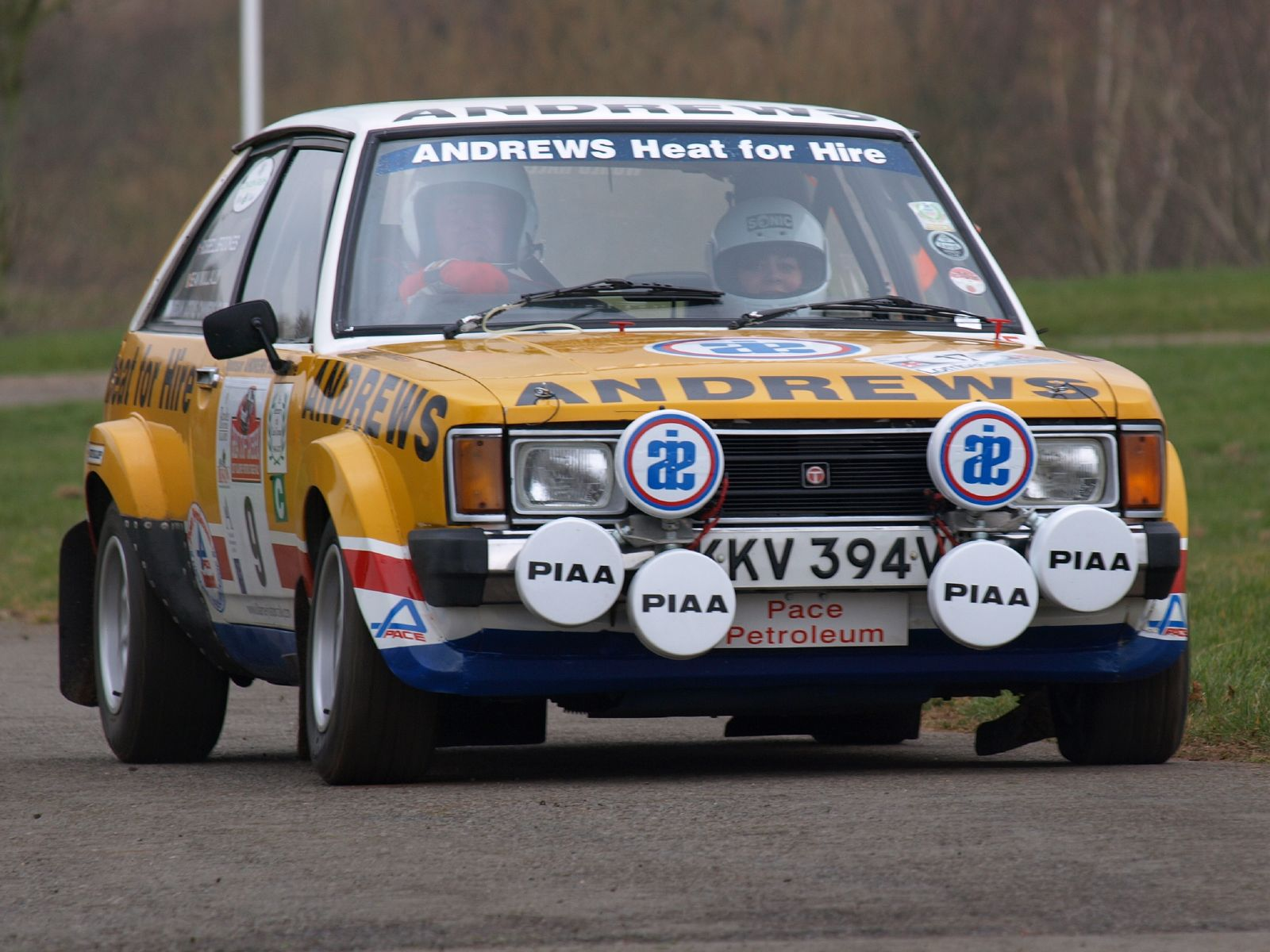
Sunbeam Lotus at the Race Retro 2008

In order to boost the Sunbeam's image, a "hot hatch" version of the Sunbeam was launched at the 1978 British International Motor Show and Paris Motor Show, badged as the "Sunbeam Ti", the car went on sale in the UK from June 1979 and was priced at £3,779. The Ti's 1.6-litre (1,598cc) engine featured twin Weber carburetors and delivered 100 bhp (75 kW; 101 PS). Key features also included two-tone paint, a body kit, and the removal of equipment that would have compromised performance. The Sunbeam Ti gained positive feedback from reviewers who felt the car's rear wheel drive configuration was well suited to a performance orientated model.

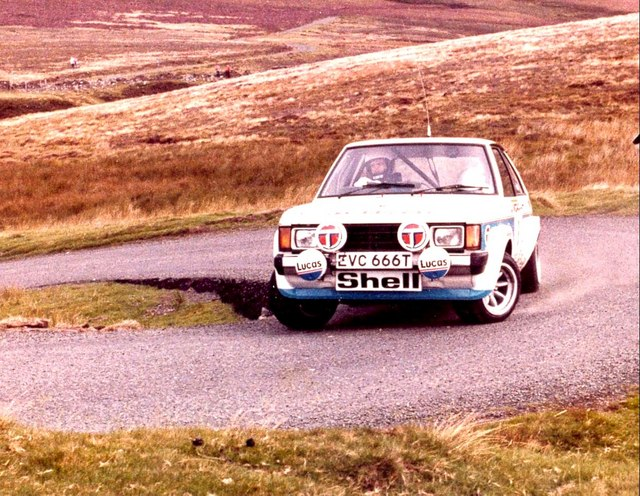
Tony Pond driving his Talbot Sunbeam Lotus at the 1979 Manx International Rally

Chrysler had also commissioned the sports car manufacturer and engineering company Lotus to develop a rally going version of the Sunbeam. The resulting "Sunbeam Lotus" was based on the Sunbeam 1.6 GLS, but fitted with stiffer suspension, a larger anti-roll bar and a larger transmission tunnel. The drivetrain featured an enlarged, 2,172 cc, version of the Lotus 1973 cc Type 907 engine, a 16V slant four engine (the Sunbeam version being the Type 911), along with a ZF gearbox, both mounted in the car at Ludham Airfield, close to the Lotus facility in Hethel, Norfolk, where the almost-complete cars were shipped from Linwood. Final inspection, in turn, took place in Stoke, Coventry. In road trim, the type 911 engine produced 150 bhp (112 kW; 152 PS) at 5,750rpm and 150 lb⋅ft (203 N⋅m) of torque at 4,500rpm. In rallying trim this was increased to 250 bhp (186 kW; 253 PS).

The Sunbeam Lotus was unveiled at the Geneva Motor Show in April 1979, but the road-going version of the rally car was not ready for deliveries to the public until after the rebranding, and on launch was sold as the "Talbot Sunbeam Lotus". At first these were finished in black with silver side stripes, although later models were also available in an alternative scheme of Moonstone Blue with silver stripes. The car saw not only enthusiastic press reviews, but also much success in the World Rally Championship - in 1980, Henri Toivonen won the 29th Lombard RAC Rally in one, and, in 1981, the Sunbeam Lotus brought the entire manufacturer's championship to Talbot.

Six Sunbeam Lotuses were acquired by Greater Manchester Police for their Traffic Area Support Services (TASS) unit in 1980 in a bid to combat car crime across Greater Manchester, operating alongside the Ford Capris being used by GMP at the time. The six cars were modified to appear as regular Talbot Sunbeams, being painted in regular Talbot colours and having exterior Lotus badging removed while also being equipped with a Britax magnetic blue light, two-tone siren horns, police warning signage on the tailgate lid and a VHF police radio. Throughout their service during the 1980s, five of the six Sunbeam Lotuses were operated interchangeably across various parts of Greater Manchester, often deployed in high-speed stolen vehicle pursuits and also issued with a total of three registration plates and corresponding tax discs each to operate more discreetly. The Sunbeams were replaced by Ford Escort XR3is and Ford Sierra RS Cosworths in the late 1980s.

== Talbot era ==
After the takeover, PSA decided that Linwood could not be made profitable and made plans to close the factory, signalling the end of the Avenger and Sunbeam model lines. The Sunbeam also overlapped in size with the Simca-based Chrysler Horizon. Waiting in the wings to replace the ageing Sunbeam was the Talbot Samba. Launched in 1981, the Samba was based on the Peugeot 104.

Even though the end was looming, the Sunbeam was afforded a facelift for its final year in production, gaining flush headlamps and a revised front end. When production finally came to a halt, approximately 200,000 Sunbeams had been manufactured.
