= Lotus 900 series =

Series of engines developed by Lotus

900 series
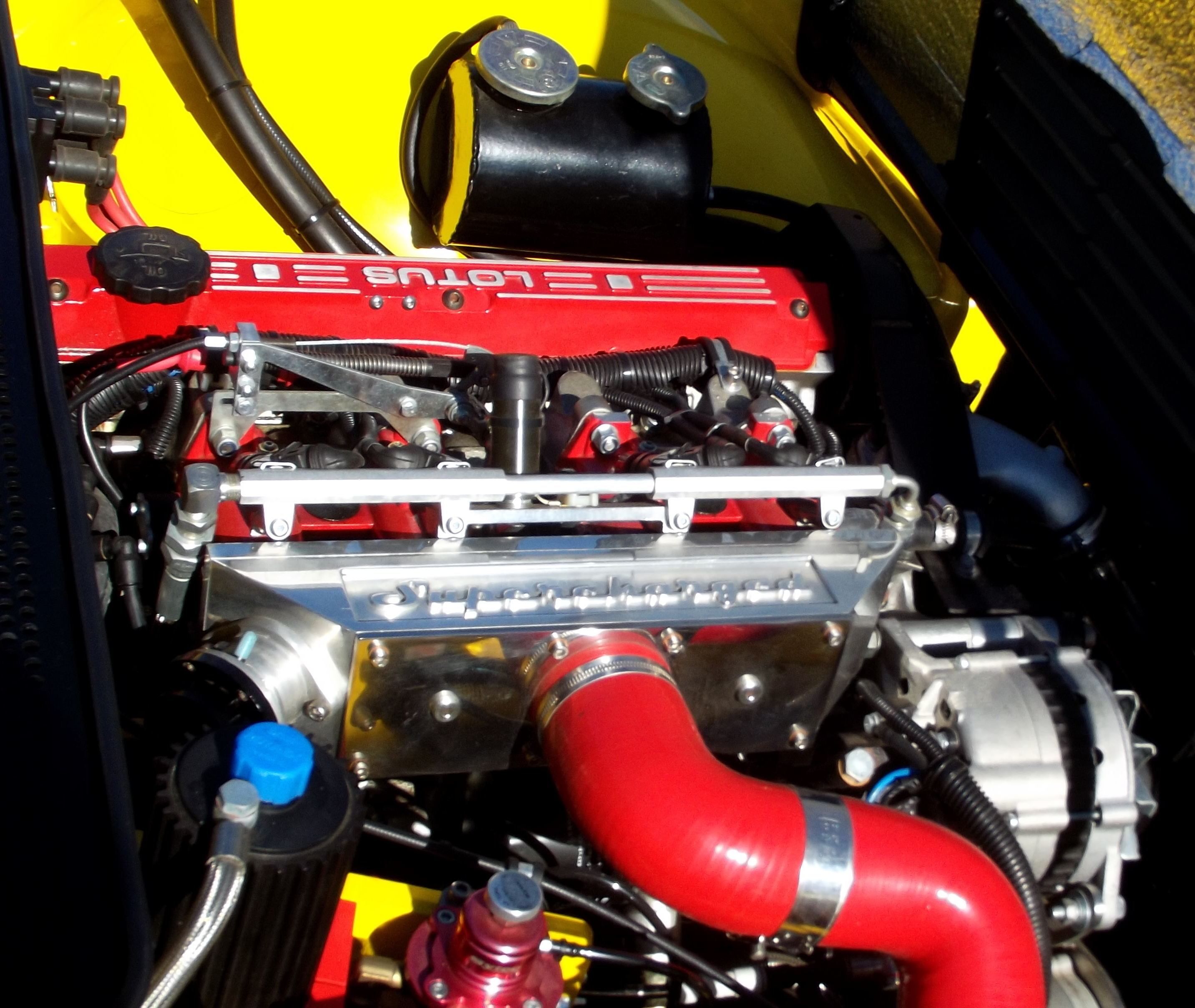

Overview
- Manufacturer: Lotus Cars
- Production: 1972–1999

Layout
- Configuration: Inline-4 (Types 904, 905, 906, 907, 910, 911, 912, 920); V8 (Types 909, 918)
- Displacement: 2.0 L (1,973 cc; 120.4 cu in); 2.0 L (1,991 cc; 121.5 cu in); 2.0 L (1,994 cc; 121.7 cu in); 2.2 L (2,174 cc; 132.7 cu in); 3.5 L (3,506 cc; 213.9 cu in); 4.0 L (4,011 cc; 244.8 cu in)
- Cylinder bore: 83 mm (3.27 in); 84.45 mm (3.325 in); 95.25 mm (3 3/4 in)
- Piston stroke: 69.24 mm (2.726 in); 69.85 mm (2 3/4 in); 70.3 mm (2.77 in); 76.2 mm (3 in); 81 mm (3.19 in); 89 mm (3 1/2 in)
- Cylinder block material: Iron (Types 904, 905); Aluminium (all others)
- Cylinder head material: Aluminium
- Valvetrain: DOHC 4 valves x cylinder
- Compression ratio: 7.5:1, 8.0:1, 8.4:1, 9.4:1, 9.5:1, 10.9:1

Combustion
- Turbocharger: Single/Twin Garrett AiResearch T3 (in Lotus Esprit)
- Fuel system: Dell'Orto 40 DHLA carburettor EZenith-Stromberg carburettors; Tecalemit-Jackson mechanical fuel injection; Delco GMP4 Electronic FI
- Management: Lucas, Bosch KE-Jetronic
- Fuel type: Petrol
- Oil system: Dry sump; Wet sump (reverted in 1982)
- Cooling system: Water-cooled

Output
- Power output: 140–350 hp (104–261 kW)
- Torque output: 140–295 lb⋅ft (190–400 N⋅m)

Dimensions
- Dry weight: 214–414.5 lb (97.1–188.0 kg)

Chronology
- Predecessor: Lotus-Ford Twin Cam

The Lotus 900 series is a family of internal combustion engines designed and built by Lotus Cars of the United Kingdom. Successor to the Lotus-Ford Twin Cam, the 900 was the first complete engine developed by Lotus. Production ran from 1972 to 1999.

== Background ==
As early as 1964, Lotus recognised the need to find a replacement for the Lotus Twin Cam engine. Colin Chapman issued a brief that listed the features to be required in a new engine, including 'high efficiency, flexibility, torque and smoothness which was suitable for hand assembly'. Unable to find this combination in any existing engine, the company used outside consultants and internal resources to define the characteristics of the next Lotus engine. After having rejected a 120° V6 due to being too wide for Lotus' chassis and a 60° V6 as too tall for the intended bodywork, the engineers determined that a 2-litre inline-four engine was the optimal choice. This future engine would have four valves per cylinder (16 valves total) operated by belt-driven dual overhead cams and develop 150 hp (112 kW). The block would be angled at 45° from vertical to permit a lower bonnet and simplify development of a 4-litre V8 version for future use in Indianapolis racing.

The design team was headed by Steve Sanville, Lotus' Head of Powertrain Development, and Ron Burr, formerly of Coventry Climax. Even though the team was able to complete the design for the new cylinder head and start work on the engine block and crankshaft, it became apparent that Lotus' racing programme and concurrent move to a new larger factory would limit the resources available for the new engine project.

== Vauxhall ==
At the 1967 Earl's Court Motorshow Vauxhall unveiled their new Victor FD model. The car included an all-new Vauxhall Slant-4 engine that shared many characteristics with the engine Lotus was developing. The Vauxhall engine was an inline 4 cylinder engine with a belt-driven overhead camshaft. The block was slanted at 45° from vertical and a V8 was planned but never realised. Most importantly for Lotus, the bore centres of the Vauxhall slant-4 were the same as those Lotus had determined for the 900 series.

After seeing the new engine at the show Chapman arranged a meeting with John Alden, Vauxhall's Engineering Director, where he negotiated the purchase of ten 2.0 L (1,973 cc; 120.4 cu in) slant-4 blocks and four complete engines. Lotus would accelerate development of the 900 engine by using the Vauxhall iron blocks as test-beds for their new cylinder head while design of their own engine block was under way. For their test engines Lotus installed a crankshaft with a slightly longer stroke.

After it became known that Lotus was using Vauxhall's iron block in their engine development programme the rumour began to circulate that the Lotus engine was based on the Vauxhall design, even through the 900 series was entirely a Lotus design.

Later Vauxhall used Lotus' cylinder head as a starting point for the design of their own DOHC cylinder head for the slant-4 block. Until that head was available some Vauxhall rally cars used the Lotus cylinder head on the Vauxhall slant-4 block.

In 1974 Scottish Vauxhall dealer SMT, part of Dealer Team Vauxhall DTV aimed to win the Scottish Rally Championship. Lotus Sport supplied heads, created the first hybrid Lotus 907 head on a Vauxhall 2279cc block. This was fitted to a HC Viva Saloon and rebranded a Magnum. Developed and driven by Andrew Cowan who later worked on the Lotus Sunbeam rally development. With valve train issues causing a DNF Bill Blydenstein took over the engine builds and fitted the Lotus 907 head to the DTV Group 2 rally Vauxhall Magnum Coupes.

Vauxhall later went rallying in Group 4 with the Vauxhall Chevette HS. The road-going versions used the Vauxhall DOHC cylinder head but early rally cars used a modified Lotus 907 head on a 2,300 cc block. These early HS models were homologated with the Lotus 907 head in November 1976 before the requisite 400 cars had been built. A rule change in 1978 by FISA made the Lotus-head cars ineligible to compete and Vauxhall switched to their own DOHC head.

== Engine development ==
As design of the new engine began, Lotus saw the need for a new sports car engine for endurance races of between 800 and 1,600 kilometres (500 and 990 mi). This prompted the company to split the 900 project into two versions; one with smaller ports and a 51° included angle between the valves for touring applications and one with larger ports and a 41° included angle for racing. Tony Rudd, Engineering Director for Lotus, identified the following six engine types created or planned during the early stages of development and production:

- Type 904 — Iron block 2 litre racing engine with fuel injection.
- Type 905 — Iron block 2 litre touring engine.
- Type 906 — Sand-cast aluminium block 2 litre racing engine with fuel injection.
- Type 907 — Die cast aluminium 2 litre touring engine.
- Type 908 — Aluminium 4 litre racing engine.
- Type 909 — Aluminium 4 litre touring engine.

Early testing of the type 904 engine did not reveal any fundamental deficiencies, although problems with the horizontally mounted distributor vibrating and the timing belt jumping off the inlet cam were identified. The Vauxhall blocks developed cracks around their main bearing bolt bosses, so a special batch were made with thicker castings. This change was applied to all subsequent slant-4 blocks.

The 905 engine experienced wear on the connecting rod against the crankshaft webs, which was solved by boring rather than honing the bushing on the small end of the con-rod so that it held more oil. Vibration problems with the distributor, mounted vertically on the 905, appeared on this engine as well, and it was found that a larger battery was needed to start the larger engine. Mechanical noise from the engine and noise from the air intake were excessive. The engines were road tested in a Vauxhall Victor and a Vauxhall Viva GT (registration number RAH 713F).

Lotus invested £550,000 in a new machining facility for the new engine, and a series of changes were made to the design to adapt it to the numerically controlled milling machines. One change was to split the case along the crankshaft centre-line and incorporate a separate one-piece bearing cap and engine skirt girdle. This change eliminated the need to machine deep main bearing saddles and restored some stiffness to the block assembly. The camshaft housings were kept separate from the cylinder head assembly, which simplified machining operations.

Development of the touring engine diverged into a version for the United States and another for the home market and the rest of the world. The main differences were in the carburettors used and compression ratios. Engines for the US received Zenith-Stromberg carburettors and an 8.4:1 compression ratio due to emissions requirements and California law penalising engines with ratios above 8.5:1. Engines destined for the UK and Europe had Dell'Orto carburettors and a 9.5:1 compression ratio. Pistons for UK and European engines were flat-topped and fly-cut for valve relief, while Federal engines had an additional indentation milled out of the centre of the piston top.

Twelve sand-cast aluminium engines were made and installed in the test fleet vehicles, which were joined by a Bedford CF van that continued to be used for deliveries while testing the engine. The alloy blocks were mechanically noisier than the iron engines. Another issue was that the alloy blocks used wet liners which were poorly supported in the initial design and this caused a high rate of cylinder head joint failures. This was dealt with by increasing the torque loading on the studs and increasing the thickness of the liners. An electrolytic corrosion issue was dealt with by changing to a stainless steel gasket and using a chemically inhibited coolant. The engine tended to show low oil pressure at idle which, while not dangerous, was expected to worry car owners and was solved by installing an oversized oil pump.

While preparing engines for Jensen other problems came to light. Transmission vibration thought to be caused by insufficient beam stiffness in the engine/transmission assembly was addressed by adding two lugs to the lower edge of the crankcase. Two oil-related problems surfaced. The first was oil being introduced into the air box during sustained high-speed cruising. An external oil-separating breather was added until the housing for the rubber-lip crankshaft seal could be re-shaped into an oil-separator chamber, which became the permanent solution. The other problem, which was seen under similar conditions, was that the oil pressure would drop precipitously. This was caused by oil being held up in the cam boxes and not draining back into the sump. This was due to mismatched drain holes, casting flash, and sticking or incorrect relief valves. The short-term solution was to phosphate the camshafts, and the other causes were dealt with as assembly problems.

== Jensen-Healey ==
The engine was complete by 1970, but Lotus' existing cars could not be adapted to use the new engine, and Project M50 would not become the Elite Type 75 for several more years. At the same time Norwegian-American businessman Kjell Qvale had taken a controlling interest in Jensen Motors and teamed up with Donald Healey of Austin-Healey fame and his son Geoffrey Healey to design a car to be called the Jensen-Healey, using Vauxhall Viva GT components. They were looking for a suitable engine for the car, having decided that the Vauxhall slant-4 would not be powerful enough after being certified for US emissions.

Chapman approached Qvale and offered to supply Jensen with 60 of the new 900 series engines per week. This initial offer was declined but, after a second offer by Chapman, in October 1971 Jensen announced that they would be using up to 15,000 Lotus 907 engines per year in the Jensen-Healey. The engine would be certified to 1973 Federal standards, but use the European Dell'Orto carburettors and be rated at 140 hp (104 kW).

The 900 series engine first appeared in production form as the 907 with the March 1972 debut of the Jensen-Healey. It was the first mass-produced multi-valve engine available to the general public, appearing one year before the 16-valve SOHC Triumph Dolomite Sprint and three years before the 16-valve DOHC Chevrolet Cosworth Vega.

The engine in the Jensen-Healey experienced a series of problems. In addition to a high rate of oil consumption, distorted cylinder liners occurred. An updated Jensen-Healey Mk2 was introduced late in 1973 with a revised engine having a redesigned crankcase, but by this time the car had already acquired a reputation for poor reliability and sales never reached expected levels. Production of the Jensen-Healey ended in 1976, but by this time Lotus was using the type 907 in their own cars.

== Chrysler/Talbot ==
In 1977, Desmond "Des" O'Dell, Director of Motorsport for Chrysler UK, approached Chapman about having Lotus supply a 900 series engine for a special project. O'Dell wanted to develop a rally version of the Chrysler Sunbeam to take up the competition role formerly filled by the Chrysler Avenger. It would be competing against the then-dominant Ford Escorts.

The engine Lotus supplied had the same 95.25 mm (3 3/4 in) bore as the 907 but at O'Dell's request displacement was increased to 2.2 L (2,174 cc; 132.7 cu in) by lengthening the stroke to 76.2 mm (3 in). Tony Rudd developed a flexible flywheel to dampen increased vibrations from the larger size. This engine was called the type 911. In 1978 Chrysler sold their European operations to the PSA Group, so when car the car debuted in 1979 it was called the Talbot Sunbeam-Lotus. Ultimately 2,298 road-car versions were sold.

In the rally car the 911 engine was tuned to be rated at 250 hp (186 kW; 253 PS). Driver Henri Toivonen won the RAC Rally in 1980, and teammates Guy Frequelin and Russel Brookes were third and fourth. The next year, the car won the Argentine Rally and placed second at Monte Carlo, Portugal, Corsica, Brazil and San Remo, winning the 1981 Championship of Makes for Talbot and earning Frequelin second place in the Drivers series.

Work began on a Group B Talbot Horizon as a possible successor to the Talbot Sunbeam-Lotus. This car had the same type 911 engine but instead of the front-engine, rear-wheel-drive layout of the earlier car the new car adopted a rear mid-engine, rear-wheel-drive layout. Only two prototypes were built before the project was cancelled due to PSA favouring development of the four-wheel drive Peugeot 205 Turbo 16.

== 900 series engine models ==
=== Type 904 ===
The type 904 engine was developed in 1968 by Lotus for use in two Type 62 cars which raced for one year in 1969 and then 1971 to 1973. This hybrid engine used a Vauxhall Slant-4 iron block and the Lotus DOHC aluminium cylinder head with Tecalemit-Jackson fuel injection. The engine was available under two marketing designations; LV220 and LV240, where "LV" stood for Lotus/Vauxhall and 220 and 240 stood for the power developed by the respective versions. A total of 25 Lotus 904 engines were made. The heads were sandcast and made by Cosworth. The air intake angle was almost vertical with larger ports than the Lotus 907 head, with maximum valve sizes of 37mm inlet and 35mm exhaust. The final development version LV265 increased power by moving the water cooling to the exhaust side of the head, keeping the inlet temperatures lower and giving 265 bhp. Lotus found the block cracked racing so reinforced the 3 centre main bearings, this modification was used on all the DTV engines.

Bill Blydenstein, the Team Manager for Dealer Team Vauxhall (DTV), acquired several Lotus heads and other parts to build LV240 engines for use in DTV's race cars, including the famous "Old Nail" Firenza among others. When Vauxhall released the 2.3 engine these replaced the 2.0 blocks.

Blydenstein also fitted the LV240 to a race Vauxhall Viva, winning the 1971 & 1972 Irish Saloon Car Championship, driven by Des Donnelly.

The 904 LV/220 and LV/240 also appeared in Daren Cars' Mk3 in the early 1970s.

Applications:

- 1969 Lotus 62
- 1971 Vauxhall Firenza (`Old Nail' race car - received engine in 1973)
- 1976 Vauxhall Chevette HS (rally version)
- 1971-73 Daren Cars Mk3

=== Type 905 ===
The type 905 engine was first run on a test-bed for the production road-car engine and was later installed in the test vehicles prior to the arrival of the first batch of aluminium blocks.

Applications:

- 1967 Vauxhall Victor (test vehicle)
- 1968 Vauxhall Viva GT (test vehicle)
- 1969 Bedford CF (test vehicle)

=== Type 906 ===
The type 906 engine had a sand-cast version of Lotus' new aluminium block and Tecalemit-Jackson mechanical fuel injection. Cosworth sand cast the heads built to the same spec as the 904 race heads. It was used in a Formula 2 open-wheeled car that had the same "Type 74" designation as the Lotus Europa Twin-Cam and was commonly called the `Texaco Star'. The Formula 3 engines in the two Type 74 Texaco Stars were prepared by Novamotor in Italy and were rated at 275 hp (205 kW).

Applications:

- 1973 Type 74 TS

=== Type 907 ===
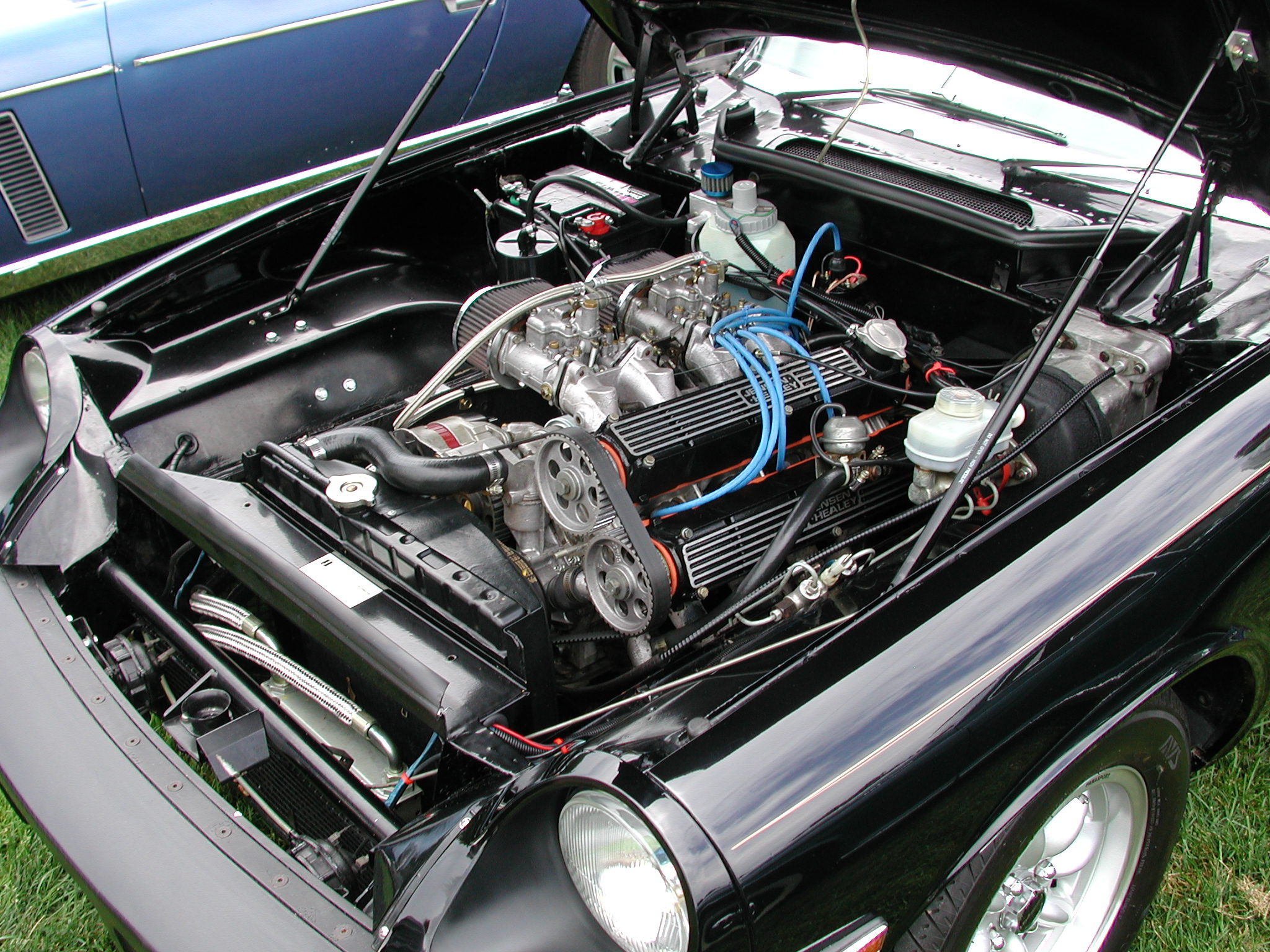
Jensen-Healey with Lotus Type 907 twin-cam engine and Dell'Orto carburettors.

The type 907 was the first version of the 900 series to go into full production when it appeared in the Jensen-Healey in 1972. It began to appear in Lotus cars in 1975 in the Lotus Elite and was later used in the Eclat and Esprit. Bore and stroke was 95.25 mm × 69.24 mm (3 3/4 in × 2.726 in), for a total displacement of 2.0 L (1,973 cc; 120.4 cu in). The angle between intake and exhaust valves was 38°. Ignition on early engines was provided by a Lucas points and coil system, which was replaced by a Lumenition system on later engines. Breathing through two 2-barrel carburettors, engine power figures for the Jensen-Healey version were 140 hp (104 kW; 142 PS) and 155 hp (116 kW; 157 PS) as used in the early Type 75 Elites. The 907 (and the subsequent 912) were offered in several levels of tune, called `specs', that ranged from 1 to 10 with different compression ratios and power outputs.

Even though they produced respectable power for their size and era, early 907s earned the nickname "the torqueless wonder" for their lack of bottom-end torque.

Applications:

- 1972-1976 Jensen-Healey
- 1975-1976 Jensen GT
- 1974-1980 Lotus Elite S1 (Type 75)
- 1975-1985 Lotus Eclat S1 (Type 76)
- 1975-1978 Lotus Esprit S1
- 1978-1981 Lotus Esprit S2

=== Type 909 ===
The type 909 was a 90° V8 with a bore and a stroke of 95.25 mm × 70.3 mm (3.750 in × 2.768 in) and total displacement of 4.0 L (4,011 cc; 244.8 cu in). While this 900 variant was mentioned in Rudd's original paper it only appeared in the Lotus Etna concept car that debuted at the Birmingham Motorshow of 1984. Power and torque were reported to be 335 hp (340 PS; 250 kW) and 295 lb⋅ft (400 N⋅m) respectively. The engine weighed 414.5 lb (188.0 kg).

Applications:

- 1984 Lotus Etna

=== Type 911 ===
The 2.2L type 911 debuted in 1978 with the same 95.25 mm (3 3/4 in) bore as the 907 but with a stroke length of 76.2 mm (3 in). This enlarged 900 variant was designed by Lotus for Chrysler (later Talbot) and their Lotus Talbot Sunbeam rally and production cars. In road trim the type 911 engine produced 150 hp (112 kW; 152 PS) at 5,750 rpm and 150 lb⋅ft (203 N⋅m) of torque at 4,500 rpm. In rally trim this was increased to 250 bhp (186 kW; 253 PS).

Applications:

- 1979 - 1981 Talbot Lotus Sunbeam
- 1982 Talbot Lotus Horizon (2 prototypes)

=== Type 912 ===
The type 912 was a four-cylinder naturally aspirated engine that Lotus began to use in their cars in 1980. The 912 shared its bore, stroke and 2.2 L (2,174 cc; 132.7 cu in) displacement with the type 911 but had many internal enhancements, including redesigned camshafts, camshaft carriers and cam covers as well as a new sump, cylinder head and main bearing girdle. This engine was initially rated at 160 hp (119 kW; 162 PS) at 6,500 rpm and 160 lb⋅ft (217 N⋅m) of torque at 5,000 rpm.

In October 1985 a high compression version of the 912 was introduced. The compression ratio was raised to 10.9:1, and the engine also received revised ports, new camshafts, new Mahle pistons and alloy cylinder liners with a Nikasil coating. Externally there were new cam covers with red paint. This engine developed 180 hp (134 kW) at 6,500 pm and 165 lb⋅ft (224 N⋅m) at 5,000 rpm.

Applications:

- 1981 Lotus Esprit S2.2
- 1981-1990 Lotus Esprit S3 and Normally Aspirated (X180 generation)
- 1981 Lotus Eclat S2.2
- 1982 Lotus Excel
- 1986 Lotus Excel SE and SA

=== Type 910 and 910S ===
The type 910 was a turbocharged engine introduced in the 1980 Esprit Essex. Esprit development engineer Mike Kimberley and Turbo engine project manager Graham Atkin convinced Chapman to focus on maximising torque at low engine speeds.

The compression ratio for the turbo engine was lowered from the 9.4:1 of the naturally aspirated engines to 7.5:1 by lowering the piston crowns and rings relative to the gudgeon pins. New camshafts that increased both lift and duration were added, as were sodium-filled exhaust valves and larger water passages in the cylinder head. The lower main-bearing girdle was made stronger. The installation included a larger radiator and higher-capacity water pump. A dry-sump system was fitted along with an additional scavenge pump and an oil cooler. The engine reverted to a wet-sump system in 1982.

The type 910 used a single Garrett AiResearch T3 turbocharger with maximum boost pressure set to 0.55 bar (8.0 psi). Lotus kept the dual Dell'Orto 40 DHLA carburettors used on the non-turbo engines but opted to have the turbocharger blow through the carburettors, which necessitated pressure seals on the throttle spindles to prevent leaks in the pressurised air-fuel system. Output of the 910 engine was 210 hp (213 PS; 157 kW) at 6,250 rpm and 200 lb⋅ft (271 N⋅m) of torque at 4,500 rpm.

In 1985 a "High Compression" (HC) version was released with new Mahle pistons. The compression ratio was increased to 8.0:1 and maximum boost pressure had been raised to 0.65 bar (9.4 psi). Carburettors still delivered the air/fuel mix but they were now the larger Dell'Orto DHLA 45M model. These changes increased power output to 215 hp (160 kW) at 6,250 rpm and torque to 220 lb⋅ft (300 N⋅m) at 4,250 rpm. In markets with stringent emissions requirements the 910 became the first 900 series engine to use fuel injection with the addition of a Bosch KE-Jetronic system in 1986. Peak power for the injected engine was the same as the HC carburetted version but came at a higher engine speed and peak torque dropped to 202 lb⋅ft (274 N⋅m). In mid-1989 the Bosch system was replaced by Delco GMP4 electronic fuel injection that included a crank-fired wasted spark ignition that eliminated the need for a distributor. Power for this version rose to 228 hp (170 kW) at 6,000 rpm and torque to 218 lb⋅ft (296 N⋅m) at 4,000 rpm.

In 1990 the engine was upgraded with an air-water-air intercooler that Lotus called a Chargecooler to become the type 910S. Maximum boost was raised again, this time to 12.4 psi (0.85 bar). The 910S debuted in the Esprit SE where it was rated at 264 hp (197 kW) and up to 280 hp (209 kW) for short intervals on overboost. Torque was 271 lb⋅ft (367 N⋅m) at 3,900 rpm.

The engine in the Sport 300, X180R and S4s used a new cylinder head cast by Zeus Aluminium Products and commonly known as the Zeus head. The revised head came with enlarged inlet valves and used a reprogrammed engine control module. The T3 turbocharger had a larger impeller, and maximum boost was up to 1 bar (15 psi). This version of the 910S was rated at 300 hp (224 kW).

The type 910S was used in the limited-production Brazilian Emme Lotus 422T 4-door sedan from 1997 to 1999.

Applications:

- 1980-1990 Lotus Esprit Essex (S2 generation) and Turbo (S3 generation) and Turbo (X180 generation)
- 1991 Lotus Esprit S
- 1990-1993 Lotus Esprit SE
- 1993 Lotus Esprit Sport 300 and X180R
- 1993-1996 Lotus Esprit S4
- 1995-1996 Lotus Esprit S4s
- 1997-1999 Emme Lotus 422T

=== Type 920 ===
The type 920 engine had an overall displacement of 2.0 L (1,994 cc; 121.7 cu in). Although not significantly larger than the 907, with a bore and stroke of 84.45 mm × 89 mm (3.325 in × 3.504 in) it was slightly undersquare, in contrast to the oversquare 907. The 920 was originally exclusive to the Italian market, where cars with engines smaller than 2.0 L fall into a lower tax regime. It would later be available in Portugal and Greece as well. The 920 was used from 1996 to 1999 in the Esprit GT3, with the improvements from the SE models. In the Esprit GT3, this engine was rated at 240 hp (179 kW). This was the last iteration of the 4-cylinder 900 series Lotus engine, which had a lifespan of nearly 30 years.

Applications:

- 1991-1992 Lotus Esprit (Italy only)
- 1996 Lotus Esprit S4 (VIN 42046, 42051 two (I am not sure) of three finally built)
- 1996-1999 Lotus Esprit GT3

=== Type 918 ===
The type 918 is a 3.5-liter DOHC, 4 valves per cylinder V8 engine with a flat-plane crankshaft. Although it carries a 9xx designation it is described as a clean sheet design. The engine had a bore and stroke of 83 mm × 81 mm (3.3 in × 3.2 in) for a total displacement of 3.5 L (3,506 cc; 213.9 cu in). Dry weight for the engine was 214 kg (472 lb). The engine was detuned from 500 hp (507 PS; 373 kW) to 350 hp (355 PS; 261 kW) in order to prevent gearbox damage.

Applications:

- 1996-2004 Lotus Esprit V8
- 1996 Lotus Esprit GT1

== Engine comparison table ==
| Type | Bore | Stroke | Displacement | Power | Torque | Fuel system | Induction^{1} |
|---|---|---|---|---|---|---|---|
| 904 | 95.25 mm (3 3/4 in) | 69.85 mm (2 3/4 in) | 2.0 L (1,991 cc; 121.5 cu in) | 220 hp (164 kW) (LV/220); 240 hp (179 kW) (LV/240) | 160 lb⋅ft (217 N⋅m) | Tecalemit-Jackson fuel injection | NA |
| 905 | | | | | | | NA |
| 906 | 95.25 mm (3 3/4 in) | 69.24 mm (2.73 in) | 2.0 L (1,973 cc; 120.4 cu in) | 275 hp (205 kW) | | | NA |
| 907 | 95.25 mm (3 3/4 in) | 69.24 mm (2.73 in) | 2.0 L (1,973 cc; 120.4 cu in) | 160 hp (119 kW) (Europe); 140 hp (104 kW) (US) | 140 lb⋅ft (190 N⋅m) | 2 Dell'Orto DHLA 45E (European Elite); 2 Stromberg 175 CD-2SE (US Elite) | NA |
| 909 | 95.25 mm (3 3/4 in) | 70.3 mm (2.77 in) | 4.0 L (4,011 cc; 244.8 cu in) | 335 hp (250 kW) | 295 lb⋅ft (400 N⋅m) | | NA |
| 911 | 95.25 mm (3 3/4 in) | 76.2 mm (3 in) | 2.2 L (2,174 cc; 132.7 cu in) | 150 hp (112 kW) | 150 lb⋅ft (203 N⋅m) | | NA |
| 912 | 95.25 mm (3 3/4 in) | 76.2 mm (3 in) | 2.2 L (2,174 cc; 132.7 cu in) | 160 hp (119 kW); 6,500 rpm 180 hp (134 kW) at 6,500 rpm (1986 Excel SA) | 160 lb⋅ft (217 N⋅m) at 5,000 rpm 165 lb⋅ft (224 N⋅m); 5,000 rpm (1986 Excel SA) | | NA |
| 910 | 95.25 mm (3 3/4 in) | 76.2 mm (3 in) | 2.2 L (2,174 cc; 132.7 cu in) | 210 hp (157 kW) at 6,250 rpm 228 hp (170 kW) at 6,000 rpm | 200 lb⋅ft (271 N⋅m); 4,500 rpm 218 lb⋅ft (296 N⋅m); 4,000 rpm | Bosch KE-Jetronic fuel injection Delco GMP4 electronic fuel injection | T |
| 910S | 95.25 mm (3 3/4 in) | 76.2 mm (3 in) | 2.2 L (2,174 cc; 132.7 cu in) | 264 hp (197 kW); 300 hp (224 kW) | 271 lb⋅ft (367 N⋅m) at 3,900 rpm | | T, I |
| 920 | 84.45 mm (3.325 in) | 89 mm (3 1/2 in) | 2.0 L (1,994 cc; 121.7 cu in) | 240 hp (179 kW) at 6,250 rpm (1996 GT3) | 215 lb⋅ft (292 N⋅m) at 3,750 rpm (1996 GT3) | | T, I |
| 918 | 83 mm (3.27 in) | 81 mm (3.19 in) | 3.5 L (3,506 cc; 213.9 cu in) | 350 hp (261 kW) at 6,500 rpm (1996 V8) | 295 lb⋅ft (400 N⋅m) at 4,250 rpm (1996 V8) | | T |
Note:^{1}"NA" = Naturally aspirated, "T" = Turbocharged, "I" = Intercooled.
