= Oliver Winterbottom =

British automotive designer (1944–2020)

- Born: 24 February 1944; Ashford, Kent, England
- Died: 6 November 2020 (aged 76)
- Occupation: Automobile designer
- Known for: Lotus Elite Type 75; TVR Tasmin

Oliver Carton Winterbottom (24 February 1944 – 6 November 2020) was a British automotive designer who designed cars for Lotus, Jaguar and TVR.

== Early years ==
Winterbottom was born in Ashford, Kent. His father was born in Oldham, Lancashire and attended school in Shanghai before coming to England and public school. His father took up medicine and qualified at St Mary's Hospital, Paddington where he met Oliver's mother who came from Lincolnshire.

In 1952 Winterbottom was sent to boarding school in Staffordshire and at the age of 11 he was committed to becoming a car designer after having made some preliminary attempts to draw a racing car in 1952.

He attended Denstone College like his father and had science on his curriculum, but also was a cross country runner and skilled marksman in the winter season. Towards the end of this college period his father accompanied him to Jaguar Cars in Coventry to discuss an apprenticeship. He was accepted as an apprentice automobile engineer and in mid-September 1961 he started at Jaguar in Coventry in their apprentice school.

== Career ==
At Jaguar, Winterbottom was part of the team that designed the XJ21 prototype that never reached production.

At Lotus, Winterbottom worked directly with Colin Chapman who appointed him to lead the design and safety engineering projects at Lotus Cars. Winterbottom designed the second generation Lotus Elite wedge design and the Lotus Eclat.

Winterbottom then worked with TVR where he designed the TVR Tasmin launched in 1980.

Winterbottom returned to Lotus and designed the prototype Lotus M90, (X100), but due to company problems, the car never reached production. He was also head of development for the V8 engine used in the Esprit, project 918.

Winterbottom later became an automotive consultant and served as membership director for the Coalition of Small Volume Automobile Manufacturers. As of December 2008 Winterbottom was working as a consultant for SAIC Motors in Shanghai.

== Personal life ==
Lived and worked in Wymondham in Norfolk He died on 6 November 2020.
