= Lotus Excel =

Sports car

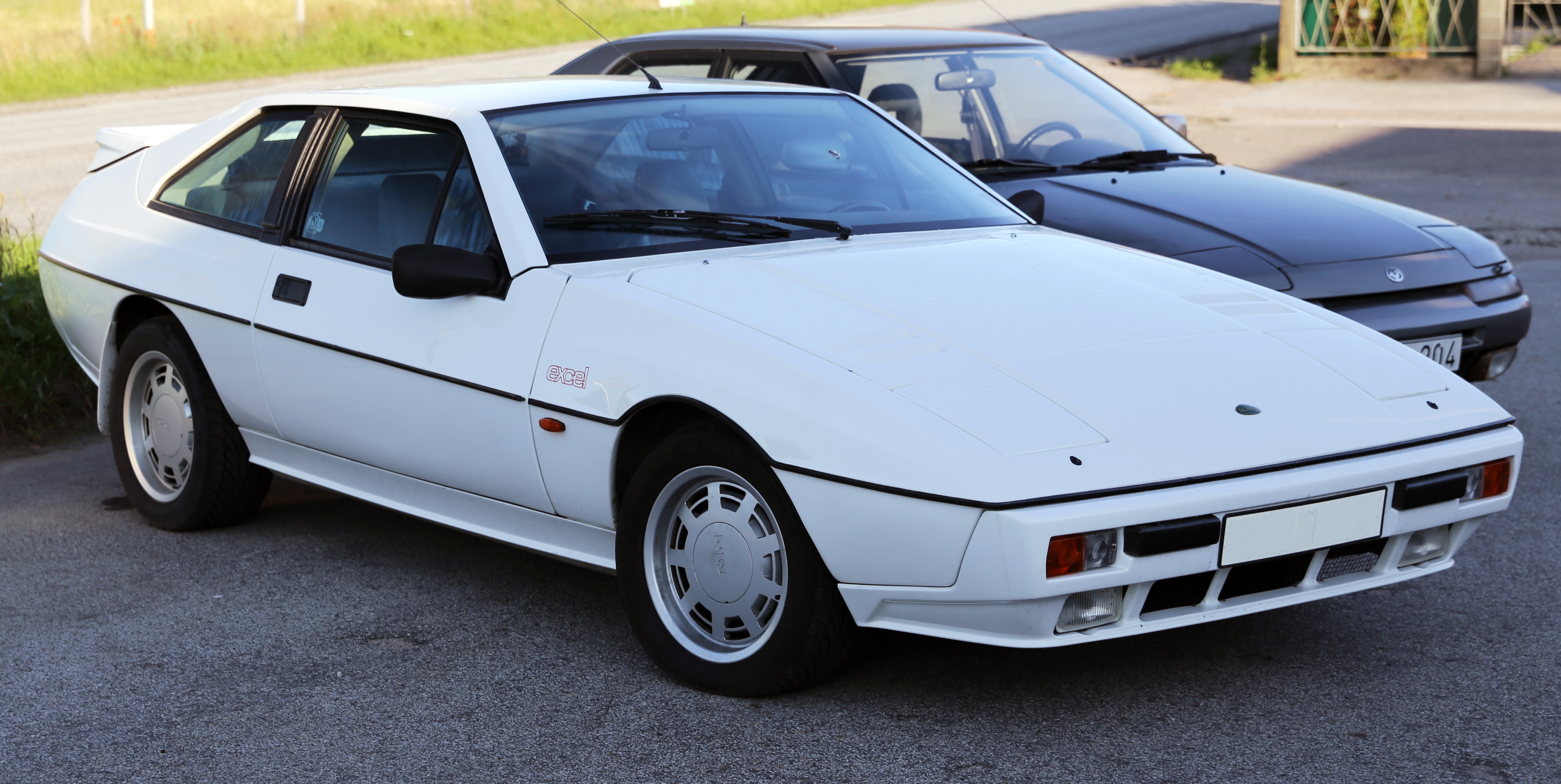
- 1986 Lotus Excel S.E.

Overview
- Manufacturer: Lotus Cars
- Also called: Lotus Éclat Excel (1982–1983)
- Production: 1982–1992; 2,075 built
- Assembly: United Kingdom: Hethel, Norfolk
- Designer: Oliver Winterbottom

Body and chassis
- Class: Sports car (S)
- Body style: 2-door 2+2 coupe
- Layout: Front-engine, rear-wheel-drive
- Related: Lotus Éclat

Powertrain
- Engine: 2.2 L Lotus 912 I4
- Transmission: 5-speed Toyota W58 manual; 4-speed ZF automatic

Dimensions
- Wheelbase: 2,483 mm (97.8 in)
- Length: 4,398 mm (173.1 in)
- Width: 1,816 mm (71.5 in)
- Height: 1,207 mm (47.5 in)
- Curb weight: 1,168 kg (2,575 lb); 1,135 kg (2,502 lb) (S.E)

Chronology
- Predecessor: Lotus Éclat

The Lotus Excel (Note: Known as the Lotus Éclat Excel for the 1982 and 1983 model years.) (Type 89) is a sports car designed and built by British automobile manufacturer Lotus Cars from 1982 to 1992. It is based on the design of the earlier Lotus Éclat, which itself was based on the earlier Lotus Type 75 Elite.

== Development ==
Toyota engaged Lotus to assist with the engineering work on the Supra. During this period, Toyota became a major shareholder in Lotus, later giving up their holding when General Motors bought Lotus.

Part of the deal between Lotus and Toyota included the use of many Toyota mechanical components in Lotus' cars. The original Excel (called the Éclat Excel) used the W58 manual transmission, driveshafts, rear differential, 14x7 inch alloy wheels, and door handles from the A60 Supra. The engine was the familiar all-aluminium, DOHC 2.2 L Lotus 912 slant-four engine also used in the Lotus Esprit S3, producing 160 hp (119 kW; 162 PS).

== Overview ==
Launched in October 1982, the Excel received two major upgrades during its 10-year production run. With the introduction of the Excel SE in October 1985, the bumpers, wing and interior were changed, including a new dashboard. In October 1986 the Excel SA with an automatic gearbox was introduced. Further facelifts in 1989 saw Citroën CX-derived mirrors, as also featured on the Esprit, and 15 inch OZ alloy wheels to a similar pattern as the Esprit's.

The body was made from vacuum injected resin and was made in upper and lower halves which were joined, evident from a piece of black trim around the car. The body was mounted onto a galvanised steel backbone chassis. This manufacturing process gave the car a good level of structural rigidity. The suspension system consisted of a single transverse lower arm coupled with an anti-roll bar and a wishbone above the lower arm at the front while at the rear the wishbone was mounted below the transverse links. Coil springs and dampers were used throughout.

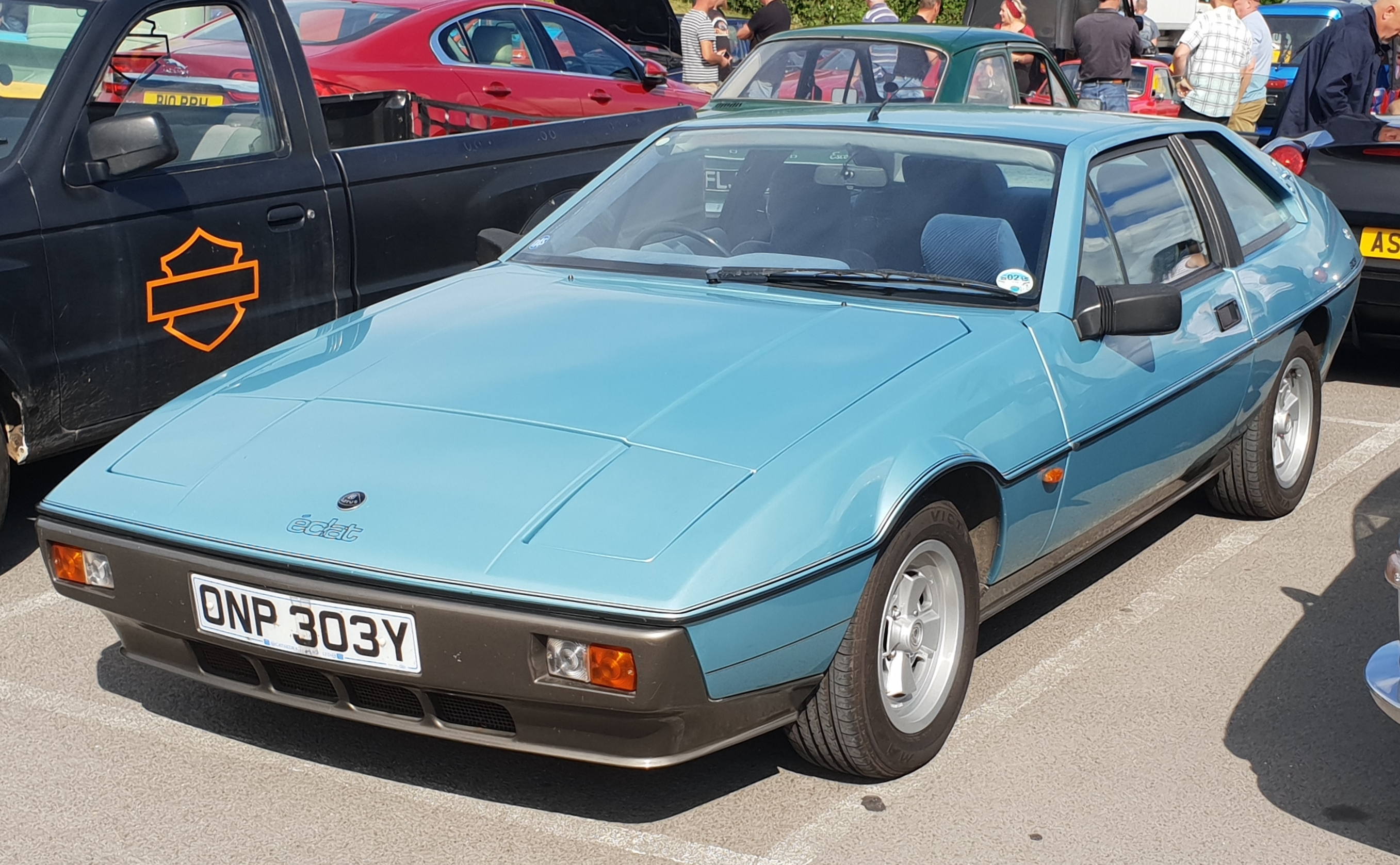
1983 Lotus Éclat Excel

The Excel is also known for its cornering and handling due to 50:50 weight distribution.

The Excel was never formally imported or made available in the US, but one was imported for evaluation in 1987. According to the importer "In early 1987 we imported one Excel (an SE, LHD, white with a blue half leather interior), on a carnet for evaluation and public review. It was returned to LCL, Hethel 6 months later as required by the carnet and US regulations."

The decision not to release the model in the USA was due to that country's stringent emission regulations (which would hinder the car's performance), and poor sales of the car in Europe.

By 1991, Lotus was planning to replace the Excel with a coupé version of the Elan roadster, but these plans were shelved as a result of falling sales which saw the whole Elan project cancelled and no direct replacement for the Excel when it was discontinued in 1992.

413 are reportedly still registered in the United Kingdom as of 2024, but 304 of them are SORN (Statutory Off Road Notification).

== Model Year changes ==
=== 1984 ===
From 1984, the Éclat Excel was referred to as the Excel. Body-coloured bumpers were introduced. It also received a louvered bonnet, a boot spoiler, and new eight-spoke alloy wheels became an option. The Lotus badge featured an all black background.

=== 1985 ===
The front wheel arch profile was flared, but it became no wider overall. The boot opening was made larger, while front fog lamps and a VDO instrument cluster were installed. 15-inch wheels became an option.

=== 1986 ===
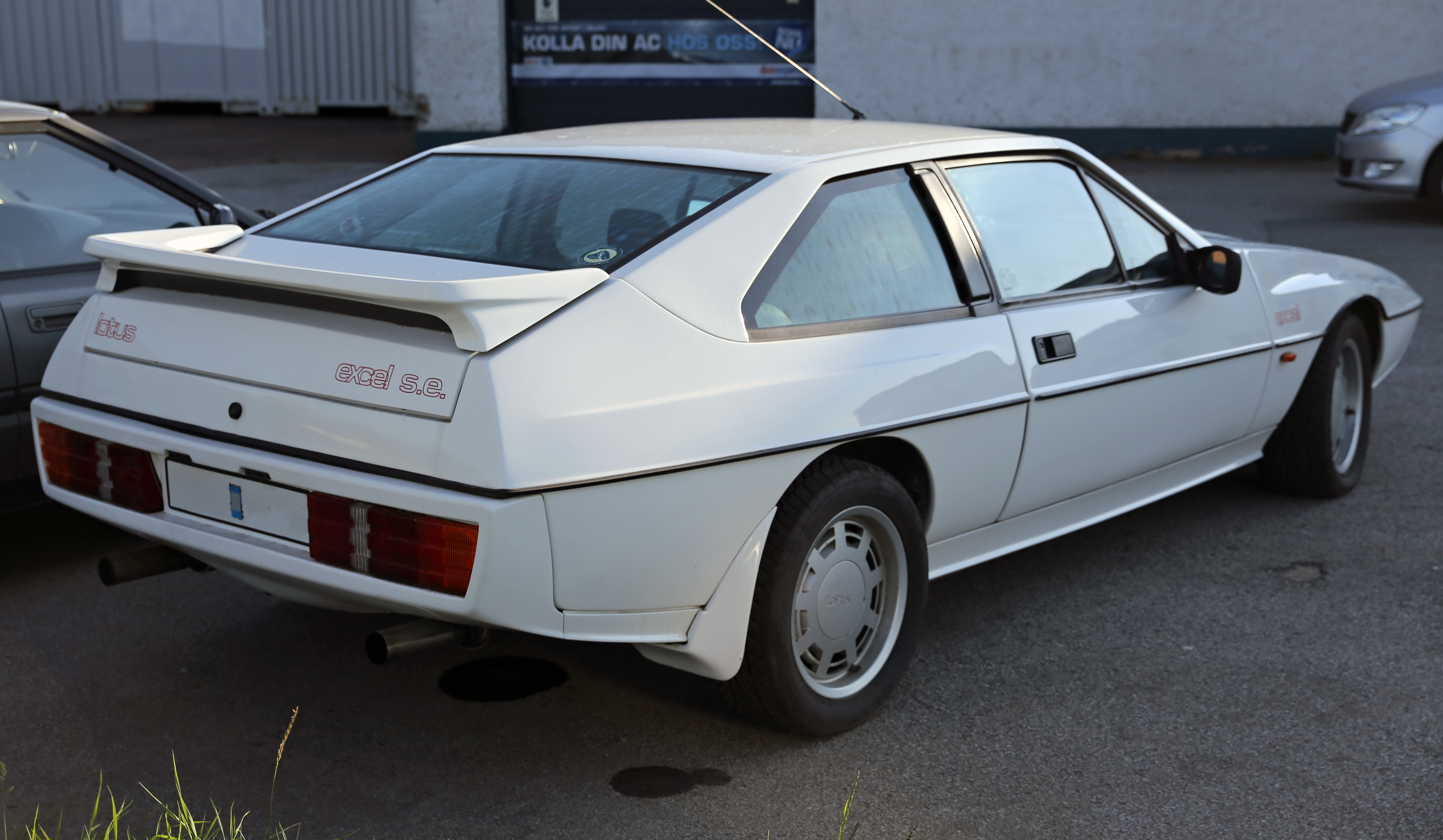
Rear view of a 1986 Lotus Excel S.E.

In October 1985, for the 1986 model year, the S.E. option arrived, coupled with the more powerful H.C. (High Compression) engine. The engine received a power increase to 180 hp (134 kW; 182 PS) and had red cam covers to further distinguish it from the standard engine. Other changes included a higher compression ratio of 10.9:1, higher lift inlet cams and larger portion to inlet and exhaust valves. Torque was marginally increased to 165 lb⋅ft (224 N⋅m) and the engine was fed by two 45 mm twin-choke Dellorto carburettors. The fascia and switchgears were modified on all Excel models, along with an upgraded air conditioning system (an extra-cost option) and a standard adjustable steering column. The standard Excel remained available alongside the pricier S.E.

=== 1987 ===
For 1987, the S.A. automatic model was made available, equipped with a ZF four-speed transmission. With a focus on comfort, it also offered cruise control and central door locking.

=== 1988 ===
In 1988, the Excel received a number of under-the-shell improvements, including a lighter, cross-drilled crankshaft, new engine mounting legs and bell housing, altered rear body mounts, a boot floor brace and revised body shell undertray, and a revised fuel system. In terms of appearance, the 1988 Excel looked mostly as it had done since 1984.

=== 1989 ===
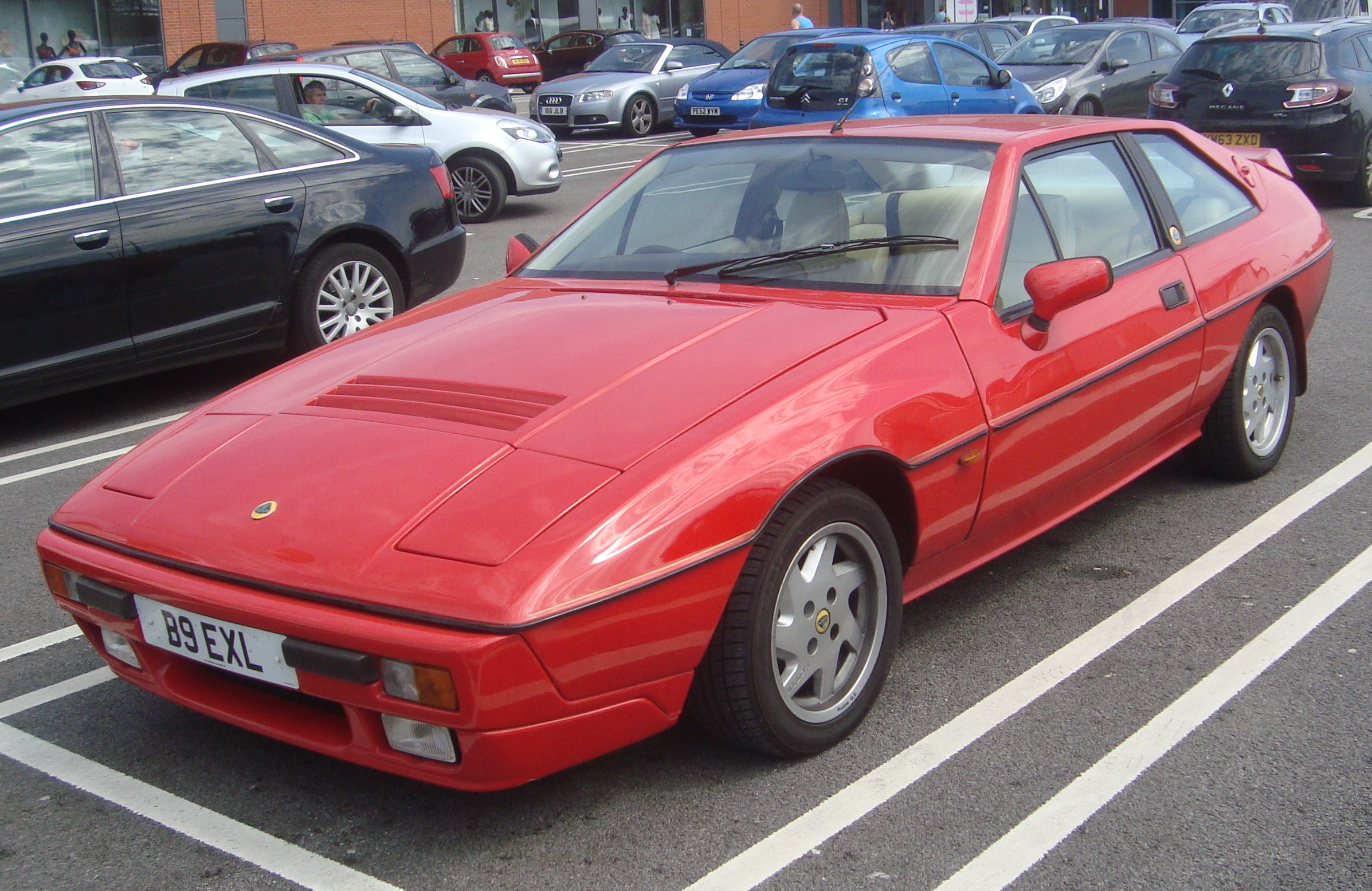
A 1990 Excel, showing the external upgrades introduced for 1989

In 1989, the Excel was given another styling update, with a restyled bonnet, new front and rear spoilers, updated wheels and interior trim. The wing mirrors were changed to the aerodynamic ones from the Citroën CX. The engine received an air intake temperature control system for increased longevity. The Excel continued to be built in small numbers until it was discontinued in 1992.

=== Hethel 25th Anniversary Celebration edition ===
Only forty of the "Hethel 25th Anniversary Celebration edition" were produced, 35 in Celebration Green Metallic and 5 in Calypso Red. This special edition received a Clarion CDC 9300 head unit, a remote control stacking CD player and upgraded speakers, red instrument lighting, air conditioning, a full tan leather interior with perforated leather panels and tan leather-clad steering wheel. The floors were carpeted in 100 per cent Wilton wool. The car's technical specifications were the same as the standard Excel.

== Models produced ==
- Excel 1982–1992
- Excel S.E. 1985–1992
- Excel S.A. 1986–1992

== In popular culture ==
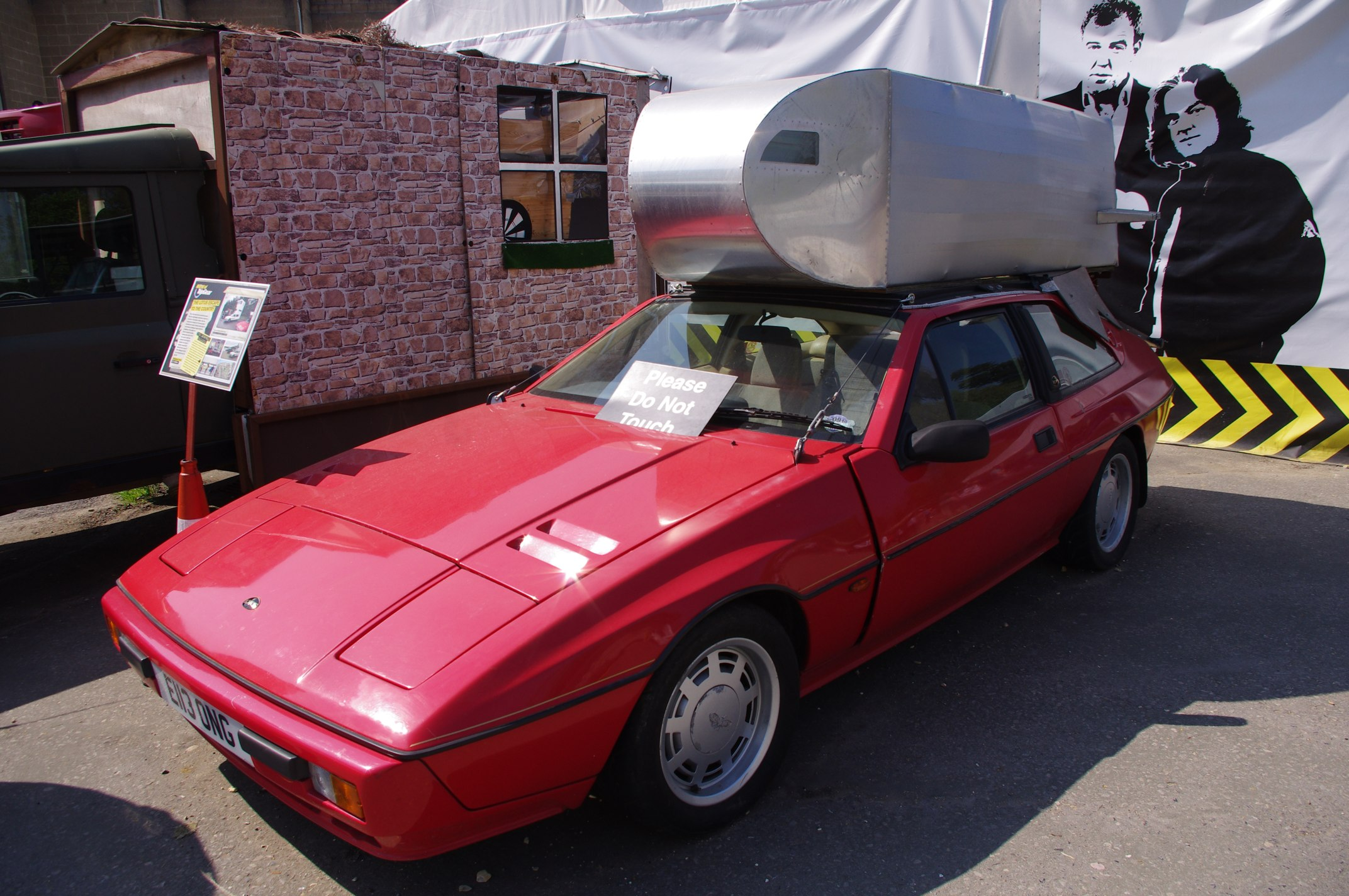
James May's 1987 Excel S.E., modified into motorhome for Top Gear.

In 2010, a 1987 Excel S.E was featured in Season 15, Episode 4 of Top Gear. Modified by James May into a motorhome, it featured a roofbox-style sleeping accommodation with a passageway to the car's interior.

A 1983 Excel was used in the 2012 Top Gear special "50 Years of Bond Cars." The Excel was modified into a functioning submarine similar to "Wet Nellie," the 1976 Lotus Esprit used in the James Bond film The Spy Who Loved Me. Driven by Richard Hammond, the car successfully operated as both a submarine and road car.

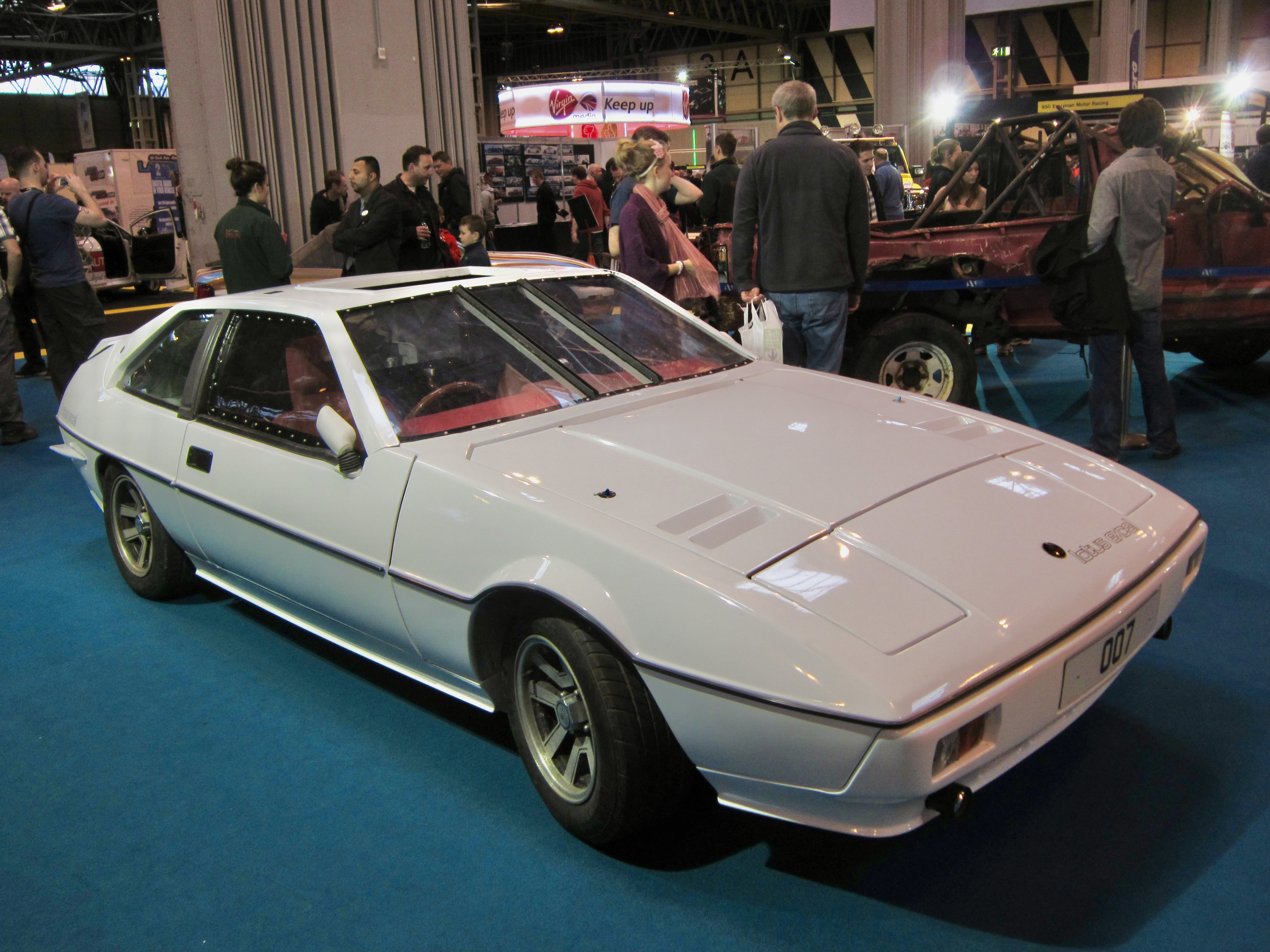
1983 Excel used in the Top Gear special "50 Years of Bond Cars."
