= Lotus Éclat =

Sports car manufactured by Lotus

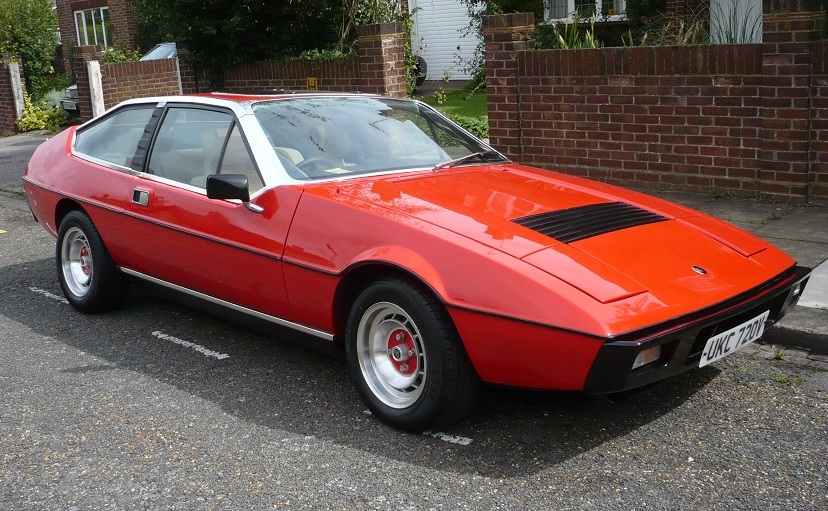

Overview
- Manufacturer: Lotus Cars
- Also called: Lotus Sprint (US)
- Production: 1975–1982
- Assembly: United Kingdom: Hethel, Norfolk
- Designer: Oliver Winterbottom

Body and chassis
- Class: Sports car (S)
- Body style: 2-door 2+2 coupé
- Layout: Front-engine, rear-wheel-drive
- Related: Lotus Elite

Powertrain
- Engine: 2.0 L Lotus 907 I4; 2.2 L Lotus 912 I4
- Transmission: 4-speed manual; 5-speed manual; 3-speed automatic

Dimensions
- Wheelbase: 2,438 mm (96.0 in)
- Length: 4,458 mm (175.5 in)
- Width: 1,816 mm (71.5 in)
- Height: 1,194 mm (47.0 in)
- Kerb weight: 1,055 kg (2,326 lb)

Chronology
- Successor: Lotus Excel

The Lotus Éclat (Type 76 and Type 84) is a sports car built from 1975 to 1982 by British automobile manufacturer Lotus Cars. It was based on the Elite but had a fastback body style which offered more practicality with storage in the boot, albeit with less headroom above the rear seats. The car was initially to be called the "Elite Coupe". The lower half of the fibreglass bodywork was identical to that of the Elite.

== Description and history ==
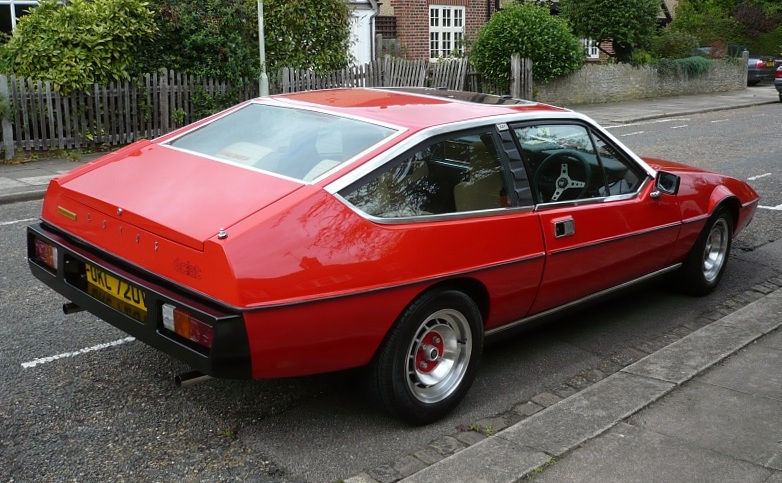
Rear view

The Éclat Series 1 (1975–1980) was announced in October 1975. It used a 1,973 cc (2.0 L) 160 hp (120 kW) Lotus 907 Inline-4 engine. Later cars (1980–1982) used a larger 2,174 cc (2.2 L) Lotus 912 engine, however, because of emission regulations modifications the power output remained the same as the early engine. It did, however, produce more torque and thus improved the car's performance. Both were versions of the 900 engine series.

Early cars either had a four speed Ford gearbox or the five speed gearbox derived by Lotus from Austin Maxi components. Later cars used a Getrag five speed gearbox. A three-speed automatic gearbox was optional. The Éclat had disc brakes at the front, and inboard drum brakes at the rear. Air conditioning and power steering were offered as options. The different equipments of the Series 1 cars were called 520, 521, 522, 523, and 524. The 520 has a four-speed transmission, a Ford bolt pattern, steel wheels, and smaller brakes. The remainder of the range have a 114.3 mm bolt pattern, the same disc brakes as the Elite, and GKN alloy wheels. They also received a twin exhaust and various other comfort items such as a clock and a cigar lighter. The 522 added power steering and the 523 also received air conditioning. The 524 is like the 523 but with the automatic transmission. Some other cars were also fitted with the automatic, and Lotus accommodated a variety of changes to the cars. There were also sporty versions of the 520 and 521 called the Éclat Sprint, with a black-and-white paint job, an oil cooler, and a variety of other performance upgrades. Approximately 1,500 examples of the Éclat were produced.

=== Chassis ===
The original mild steel chassis fitted by Lotus had a strip of felt fitted between body and the steel crossmember of the chassis. In damp climates, the felt became a water trap and caused structural corrosion, resulting in a crumbling of the chassis from the rear. Chassis replacement was initially not cost effective on the Éclat and Elite, and in consequence resale values suffered. Series 2 cars were fitted with a galvanised chassis as standard and a large number of Series 1 vehicles have had replacements fitted, which are usually galvanised.

== Reception ==
The car was well received by the motoring press, which praised the car's handling and grip. The fuel consumption was also considered reasonable at the time, in comparison with the larger and multi cylinder engines used in competitor GT cars.

== Éclat Riviera ==
In 1981, Lotus introduced the Type 84, called the Lotus Éclat S 2.2 Riviera. This model, which was available for two years, came with a removable roof panel, vinyl roof, vented bonnet and a rear spoiler. Production totaled 73 units out of the 223 series 2.2 Éclats.

== Éclat Excel ==
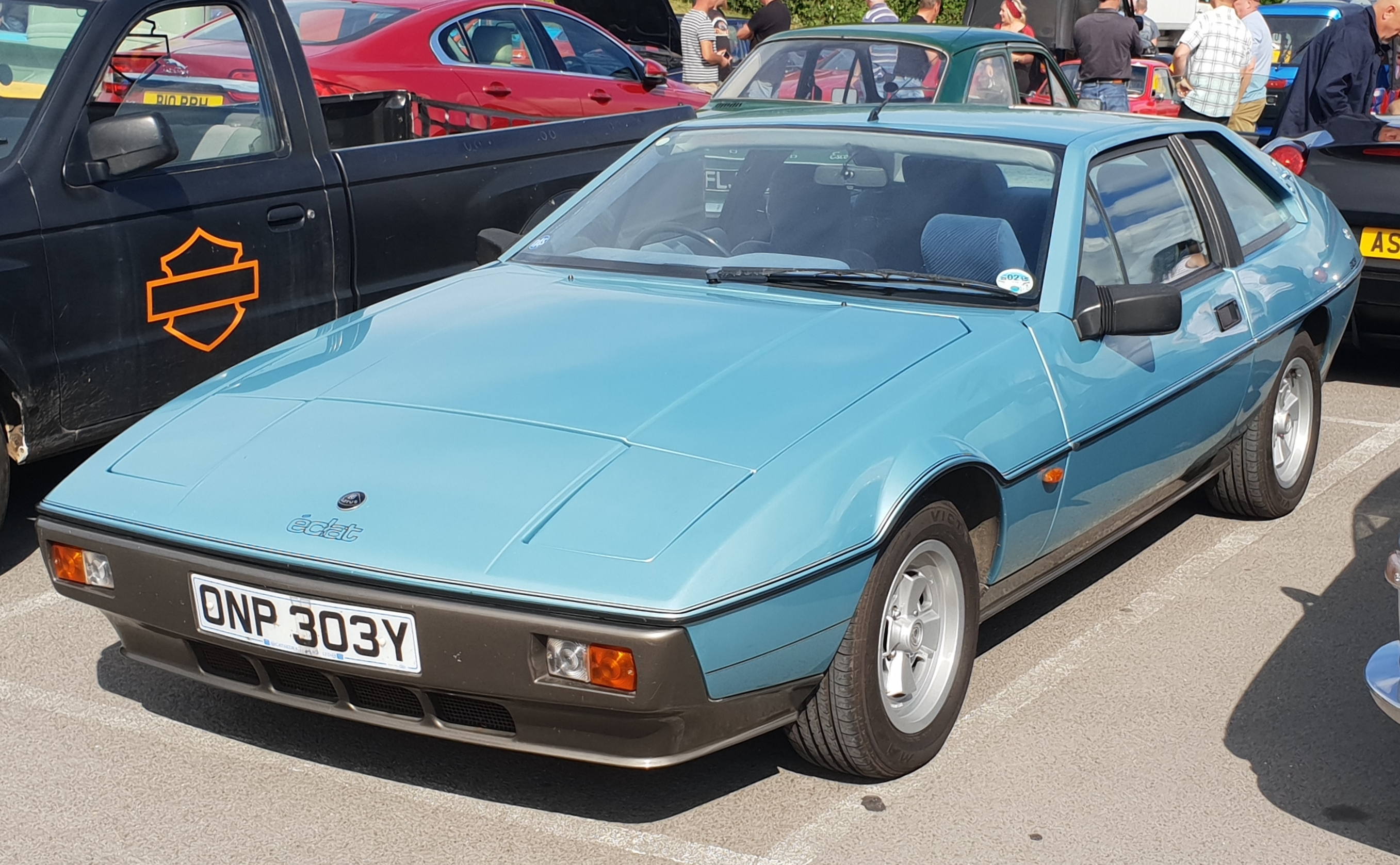
1983 Lotus Éclat Excel

In 1982, the Éclat was developed into the Éclat Excel (later badged simply as the Lotus Excel), which used the same engine, but a modified version of the chassis, altered bodywork, a Toyota gearbox, driveline, and brakes.
