= Lotus Cars =

British multinational manufacturer of sports cars and electric lifestyle vehicles

- Type: Subsidiary
- Industry: Automotive
- Founded: 1952; 74 years ago
- Founder: Colin Chapman
- Headquarters: Hethel, Norfolk, England, United Kingdom
- Area served: Worldwide
- Key people: Qingfeng Feng (Director and CEO); Alexious Lee (Director); Daxue Wang (CFO)
- Products: Automobiles
- Production output: ▲12,134 units (2024)
- Revenue: ▲$924 million (2024)
- Owners: Geely Holding
- Number of employees: 1,385 (2021)
- Website: lotuscars.com

Lotus Group (also known as Lotus Cars, or simply Lotus) is a British multinational automotive manufacturer of luxury sports cars, racing cars, and electric vehicles.

Lotus Group is composed of three primary entities. Lotus Cars is a high-performance sports car company based in Hethel, Norfolk. Lotus Technology Inc. (Nasdaq: LOT) is an all-electric lifestyle vehicle company, headquartered in Wuhan, China, that operates regional facilities in the United Kingdom, the Netherlands, and Germany. Additionally, Lotus Engineering is an engineering consultancy firm headquartered at the Lotus Advanced Technology Centre (LATC) located at the University of Warwick's Wellesbourne Campus.

Lotus was founded by Colin Chapman and owned by him until his death in 1982. After this and a period of financial instability, Lotus was bought by General Motors, then Romano Artioli and then DRB-HICOM through its subsidiary Proton, which owned Lotus from 1996 to 2017. Lotus is currently fully owned by Chinese multinational Geely. Between 2017 and 2025, Lotus traded as Lotus NYO in China due to a trademark dispute with Youngman.

Lotus was previously involved in Formula One racing, via Team Lotus, winning the Formula One World Championship seven times. Notable Lotus cars include the Lotus Seven, the Elan, the Esprit and the Elise.

== History ==
=== Early years ===
The company was formed in 1952 as Lotus Engineering Ltd. by Colin Chapman but had earlier origins in 1948 when Chapman built his first trials car in a garage. The four letters in the middle of the logo represent Chapman's full name, Anthony Colin Bruce Chapman. When the logo was created, Chapman's original partners, Michael and Nigel Allen, were allegedly told that the letters stood for Colin Chapman and the Allen Brothers.

The first factory was situated in old stables behind the Railway Hotel in Hornsey, North London. Team Lotus, which was split from Lotus Engineering in 1954, was active and competitive in Formula One racing from 1958 to 1994. The Lotus Group of Companies was formed in 1959. This was composed of Lotus Cars Limited and Lotus Components Limited, which focused on road cars and customer competition-car production, respectively. Lotus Components Limited became Lotus Racing Limited in 1971, but the newly renamed entity ceased operation that same year.

The company moved to a purpose-built factory at Cheshunt in 1959, and since 1966 it has occupied a modern factory and road test facility at Hethel, near Wymondham in Norfolk. The site is a former World War II airfield, RAF Hethel, and the test track uses sections of the old runway.

In its early days, Lotus sold cars aimed at private racers and trialists. Its early road cars could be bought as kits in order to save on purchase tax. The kit car era ended in the late 1960s and early 1970s, with the Lotus Elan Plus Two as the first Lotus road car not offered in kit form, and the Lotus Eclat and Lotus Elite of the mid-1970s were offered only in factory-built versions.

With the Lotus Eleven, built between 1956 and 1958, the tradition of naming Lotus models with an “E” began. Allegedly, this was to avoid confusion with the Roman numerals (IX, X, XI, etc.) that had been used previously. Only a few exceptions to this tradition exist, such as the Lotus Seven.

After the Lotus Elite of the 1950s, which featured a complete fibreglass monocoque fitted with built-in steel pickup points for mounting major components, Lotus found critical and sales success in the 1960s with the Lotus Elan. This two-seater was later developed to two-plus-two form (Elan +2S). Lotus was notable for its use of fibreglass bodies, backbone chassis and overhead camshaft engines, initially supplied by Coventry Climax but later replaced by Lotus-Ford units (Ford block, Lotus head and twin-cam valve gear). Lotus also worked with Ford on the Lotus Cortina, a successful sports saloon.

Another Lotus of the late 1960s and early 1970s was the two-seater Lotus Europa, initially intended only for the European market, which paired a backbone chassis and lightweight body with a mid-mounted Renault engine, later upgraded to the Lotus-Ford twin-cam unit as used in the Elan.

The Lotus Seven, originating in the 1950s as a simple, lightweight open two-seater. continued in production into the early 1970s. Lotus sold the rights to produce the Seven to Caterham, which has continued to produce the car since then.

By the mid-1970s, Lotus sought to move upmarket with the launch of the Elite and Eclat models, four-seaters aimed at prosperous buyers, with features such as optional air conditioning and automatic transmissions. The mid-engine line continued with the Lotus Esprit, which became one of the company's longest-lived and most iconic models. Lotus developed its own series of four-cylinder DOHC engines, the Lotus 900 series, and later a V8, and turbocharged versions of the engines appeared in the Esprit.

Variants of the 900-series engine were supplied for the Jensen Healey sports car and the Sunbeam Lotus "hot hatchback". In the 1980s, Lotus collaborated with Vauxhall Motors to produce the Lotus Carlton, the fastest roadgoing Vauxhall car.

=== Financial troubles, death of Chapman ===
By 1980, Group Lotus was in serious financial trouble. Production had dropped from 1,200 units per year to a mere 383. This situation resulted from the worldwide economic recession combined with the virtual collapse of sales in the American market and limited development of the model range.

In early 1982, Chapman forged an agreement with Toyota to exchange intellectual property and applied expertise. As a result, Lotus Engineering helped develop the Mk2 Toyota Supra, also known as the Toyota Celica XX. The partnership also allowed Lotus to launch the new Lotus Excel to replace the ageing Lotus Eclat. Using drivetrain and other components built by Toyota enabled Lotus to sell the Excel for £1,109 less than the outgoing Eclat.

Looking to reenter the North American market, Chapman was approached by young law professor and investment banking consultant Joe Bianco, who proposed a new and separate American sales company for Lotus. By creating an unprecedented tax-incentivised mechanism by which each investor received a personalised Lotus Turbo Esprit, the new American company, Lotus Performance Cars Inc. (LPCI), was able to provide fresh capital to Group Lotus in the United Kingdom. Former Ferrari North America general manager John Spiech was recruited to run LPCI, which imported the remarkable Giugiaro-designed Turbo Esprit for the first time. American sales began to quickly jump into six figures annually.

Chapman died of a heart attack on 16 December 1982 at the age of 54. At the time, both Chapman and Lotus were linked to the DeLorean Motor Company scandal regarding the use of UK Government subsidies for the production of the DMC DeLorean, for which Lotus had designed the chassis. Chasing large sums of money that had disappeared from the DeLorean company, Lotus was besieged by Inland Revenue inspectors, who imposed an £84 million legal "protective assessment" on the company. At the trial of Lotus accountant Fred Bushell, the judge insisted that had Chapman lived, he would have received a sentence "of at least 10 years."

With Group Lotus near bankruptcy in 1983, David Wickins, the founder of British Car Auctions, agreed to become the new company chairman through an introduction by his friend Mark Thatcher. Taking a combined 29% BCA/personal stake in Group Lotus, Wickins negotiated with Inland Revenue and recruited new investors: merchant bank Schroeder-Wagg (14%), Michael Ashcroft's Bermudian operating company Benor (14%) and Sir Anthony Bamford of JCB (12%). Wickins oversaw a complete turnaround in the company's fortunes, for which he was dubbed "the saviour of Lotus."

=== International ownership ===
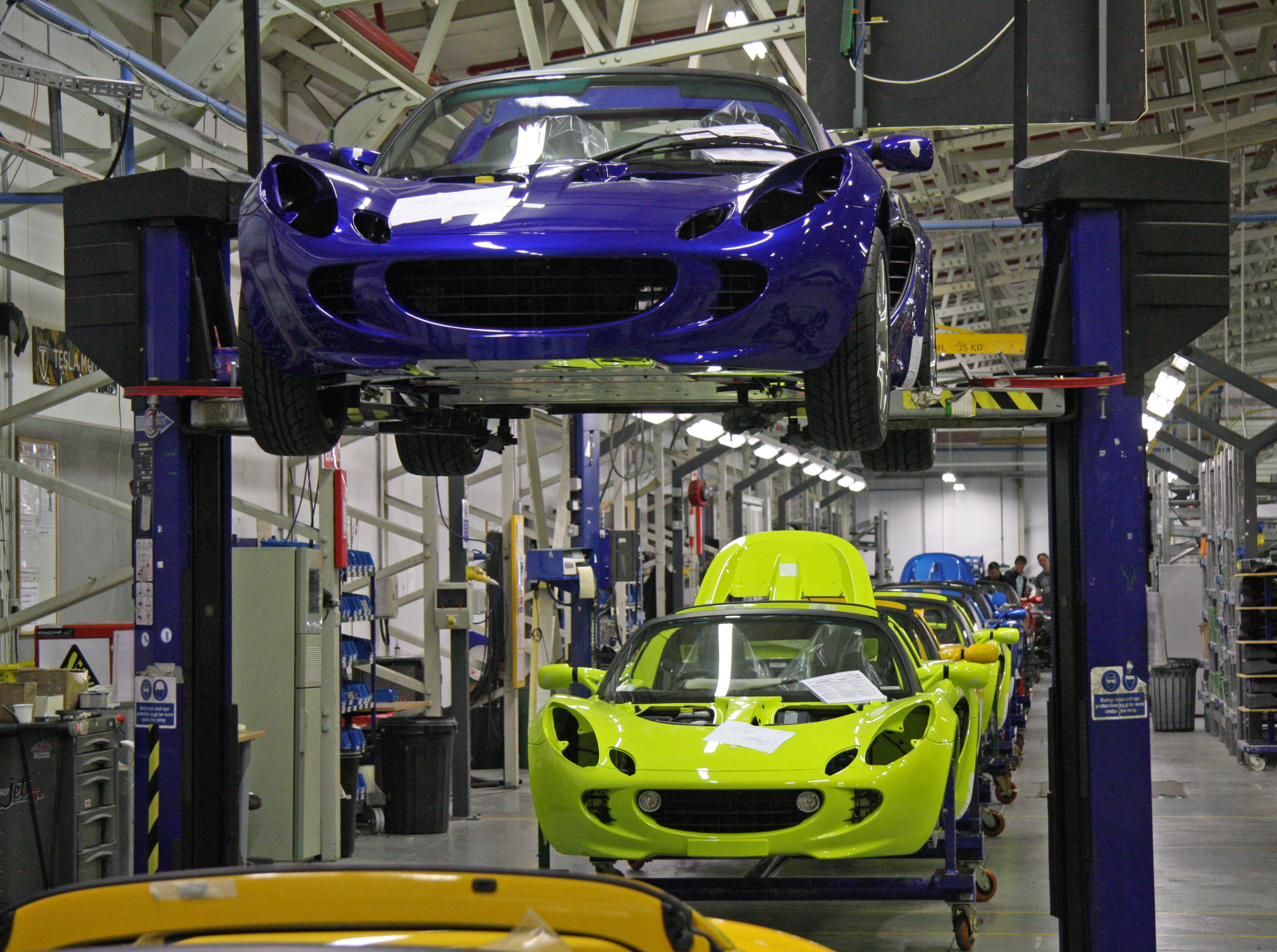
Lotus final assembly

Despite having employed designer Peter Stevens to revamp the range and design two new concept cars, by 1985 the British investors recognised that they lacked the capital to fund production and sought to find a buyer. In January 1986, Wickins oversaw the majority sale of the Group Lotus companies and 100% of North American–based LPCI to General Motors. After four months, Toyota sold GM its stake. By October 1986, GM had acquired a 91% stake in Group Lotus for £22.7 million, which allowed GM to legally force the company buyout.

On 27 August 1993, GM sold the company for £30 million, to A.C.B.N. Holdings S.A. of Luxembourg, a company controlled by Italian businessman Romano Artioli, who also owned Bugatti Automobili SpA. In 1996, a majority share in Lotus was sold to Malaysian car company Proton.

Lotus Cars was awarded the Queen's Award for Enterprise for contribution to international trade, one of 85 companies receiving the recognition in that category in 2002. Lotus cars wore the badge of the award for several years.

On 24 May 2017, Chinese multinational Geely announced that it was taking a 51% controlling stake in Lotus. The remaining 49% was acquired by Etika Automotive, a holding company of Proton's major shareholder Syed Mokhtar Albukhary.

In January 2021, Geely announced a joint venture with Renault–Nissan–Mitsubishi Alliance and its Alpine division to develop a range of electric performance cars sharing some of their future platforms. In April 2021, Lotus announced plans to produce only electric cars by 2028 and increase production numbers from around 1,500 per annum to tens of thousands. Geely and Etika Automotive provided two billion pounds (US$2.8 billion) to fund the changes.

In November 2023, Lotus Cars entered the Indian market through a partnership with Exclusive Motors. The company introduced the Lotus Eletre electric SUV, launching it as one of the most powerful luxury electric vehicles in the country, priced at ₹2.55 crore.

Lotus Technology Inc., the electric-vehicle division of Lotus, which has a different ownership structure (30% by Etika and the rest by Geely and Nio Capital), was listed on Nasdaq in February 2024, following the completion of a merger with a special-purpose acquisition company affiliated with L Catterton. After the listing, 10.3% of shares are held by the public.

In August 2026, Geely consolidated Lotus Cars into Lotus Technology, by acquiring the rest of stake from Etika.

== Operations ==
Currently organised as Group Lotus Limited, the business is divided into Lotus Cars and Lotus Engineering.

In addition to manufacturing sportscars, the company also acts as an engineering consultancy, providing engineering development—particularly of suspensions—for other car manufacturers. Lotus's powertrain department is responsible for the design and development of the four-cylinder Ecotec engine found in many of GM's Vauxhall, Opel, Saab, Chevrolet and Saturn cars. The American Elise and Exige models used the 1.8L VVTL-i I4 from Toyota's late Celica GT-S and the Matrix XRS.

Michael Kimberley, who had been a guiding figure at Lotus in the 1970s, returned as acting chief executive officer in May 2006. He chaired the executive committee of Lotus Group International Limited (LGIL), established in February 2006 with Syed Zainal Abidin (managing director of Proton Holdings Berhad) and Badrul Feisal (non-executive director of Proton Holdings Berhad). LGIL is the holding company of Lotus Group Plc.

Kimberley retired as CEO on 17 July 2009, replaced on 1 October 2009 by former Ferrari executive Dany Bahar. Bahar intended to drive the brand into the expanding global luxury-goods sector and away from the company's traditional lightweight simplicity and pure driving-experience focus. Bahar was suspended on 25 May 2012 while an investigation into his conduct was undertaken. On 7 June 2012, Lotus announced the termination of Bahar and the appointment of Aslam Farikullah as the new chief operating officer. The ambitious plans for several new models were cancelled following Bahar's departure. Jean Marc Gales became CEO in 2014, and in 2017, he enabled the company to achieve its first profit in decades. Gales left the company in June 2018 for personal reasons and was replaced by Feng Qingfeng from Lotus Group's parent company, Geely.

October 2018 saw further senior personnel changes as Phil Popham was named CEO of Lotus Cars, with Qingfeng remaining in charge of Group Lotus.

In January 2021, Matt Windle was appointed managing director of Lotus Cars after Phil Popham resigned.

In June 2025, Lotus was considering shifting car production from its UK base in Norfolk to a new US plant, threatening 1,300 jobs, due to high US tariffs on imported vehicles. Although a UK-US deal was expected to soon lower tariffs to 10%, the current trade environment had already forced Lotus to announce job cuts and rethink its manufacturing strategy.

== Formula One and motorsport ==
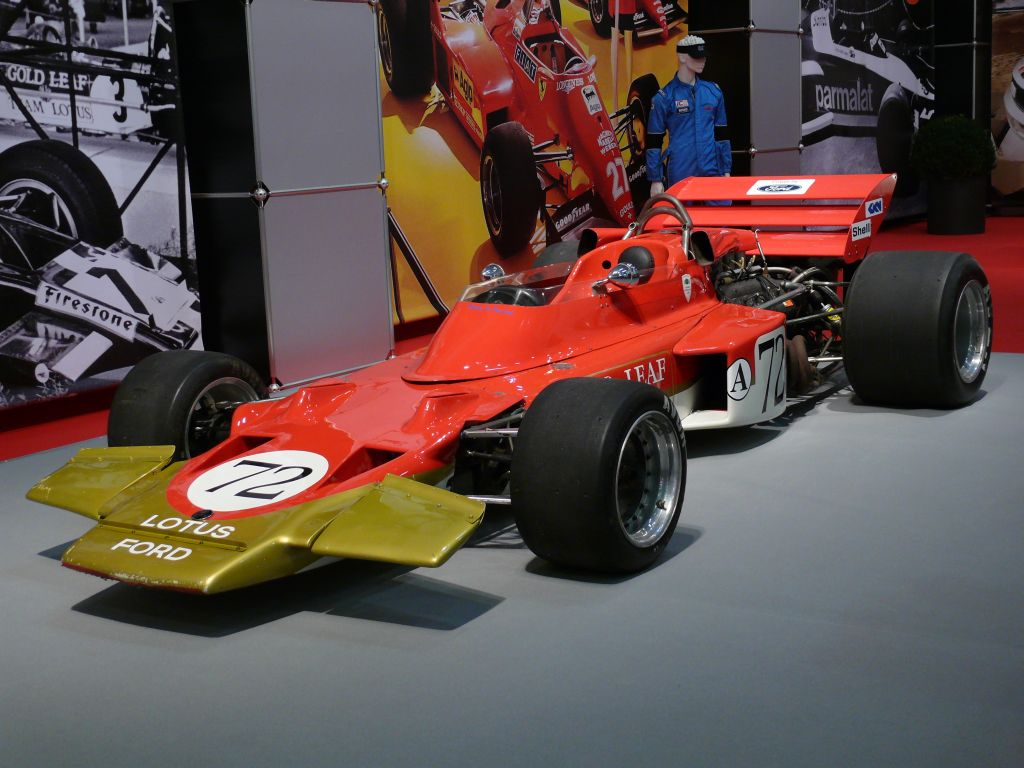
Lotus 72

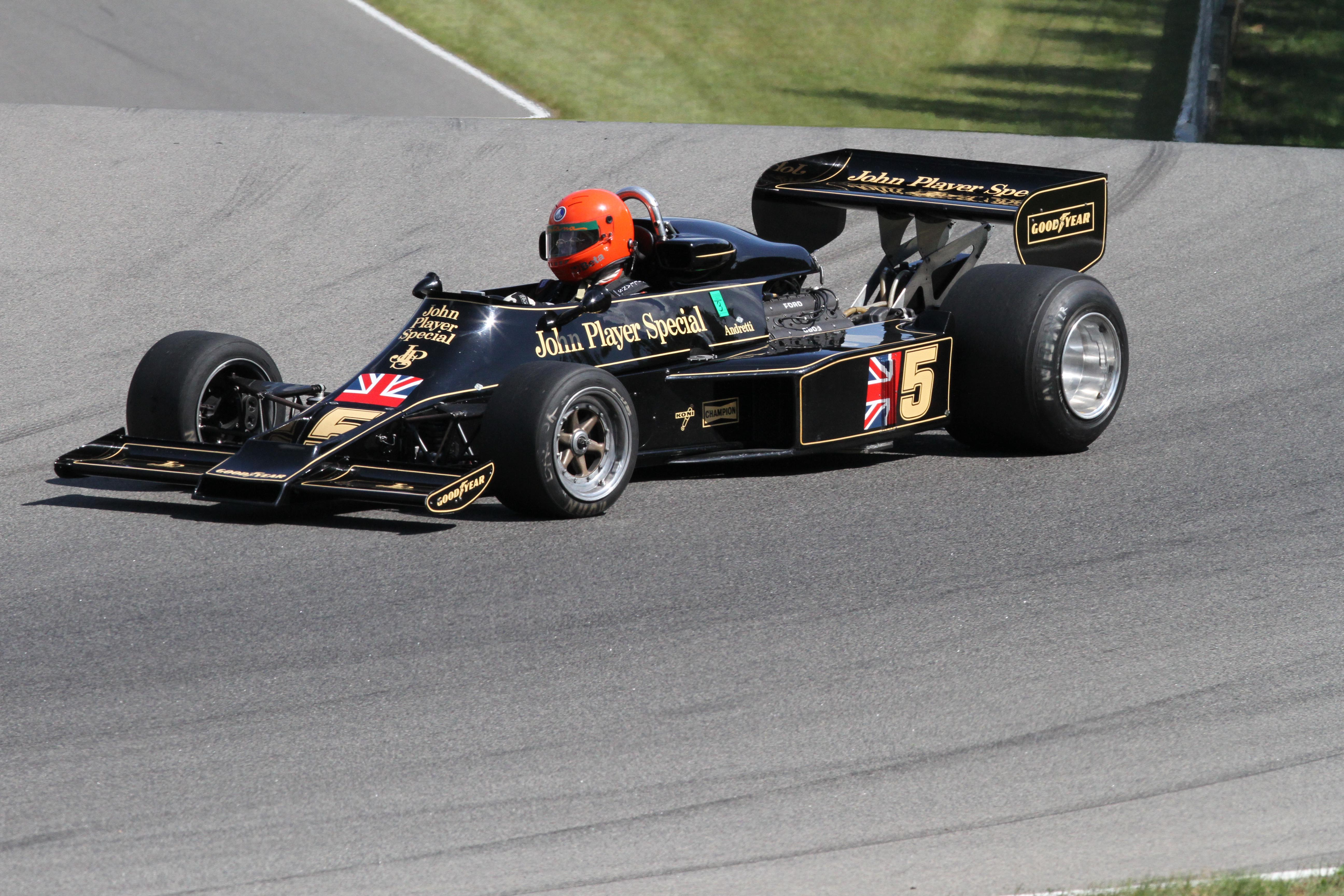
Lotus 77

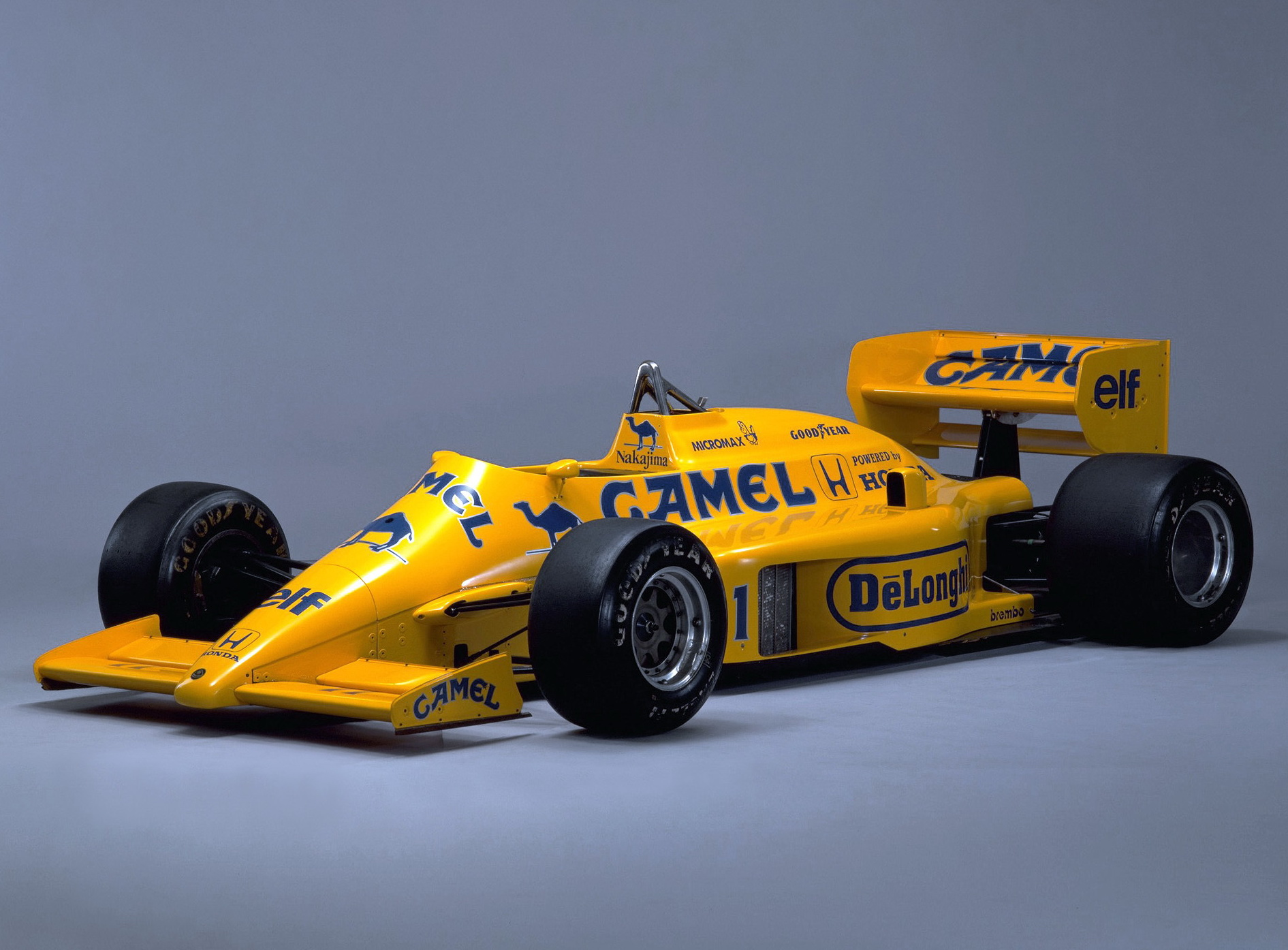
Lotus 99T

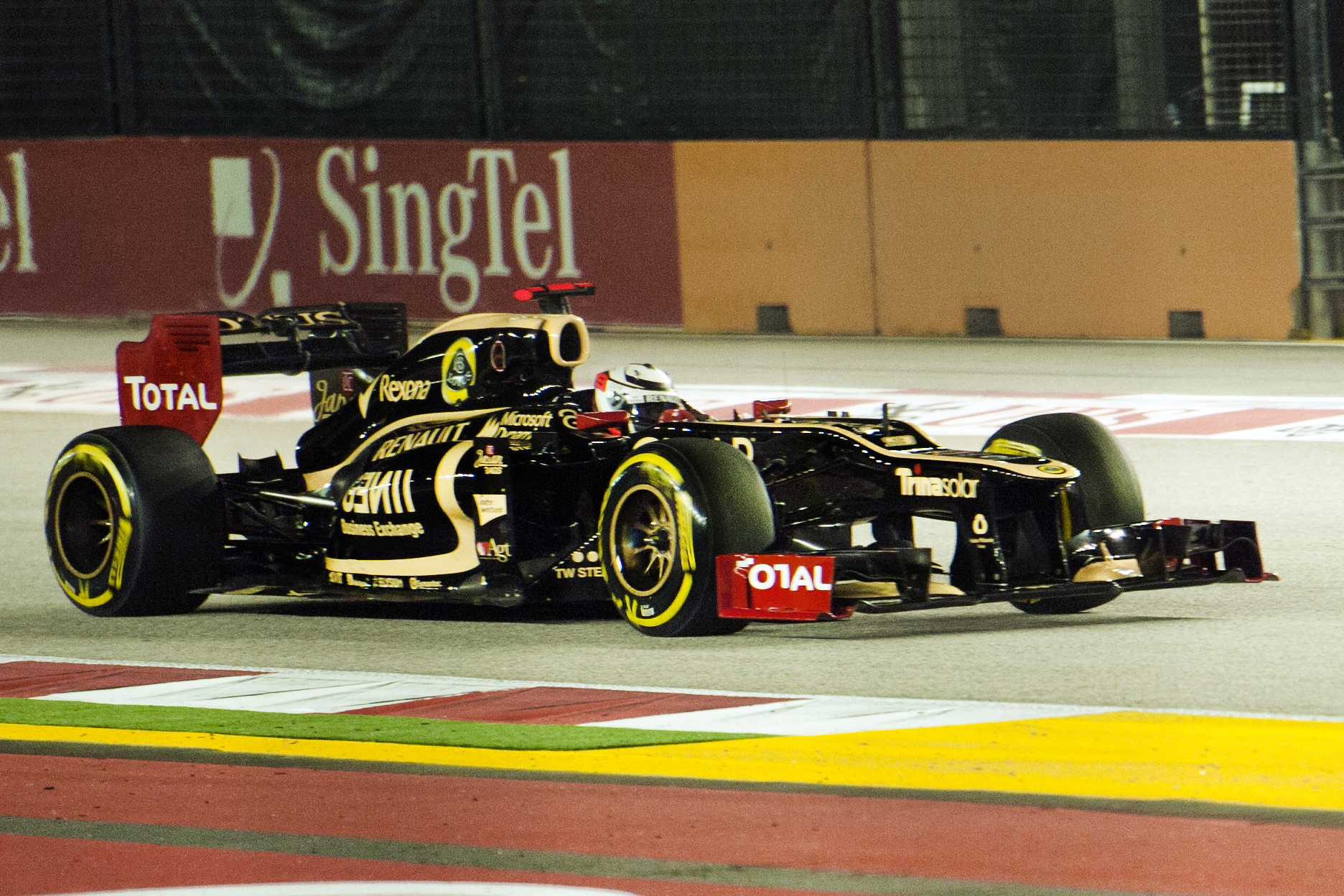
Lotus E20

In its early days, the company encouraged its customers to race its cars, and it first entered Formula One through its sister company Team Lotus in 1958. A Lotus Formula One car driven by Stirling Moss won the marque's first Grand Prix in 1960 at Monaco. Moss drove a Lotus 18 entered by privateer Rob Walker. Major success came in 1963 with the Lotus 25, which, with Jim Clark driving, won Team Lotus its first F1 World Constructors' Championship. Clark was killed in April 1968 when the rear tyre of his Formula Two Lotus 48 failed while making a turn at a race in Hockenheim. His death was a severe blow to the team and to Formula One, as he had been the dominant driver of Lotus's early years. That year's championship was won by Clark's teammate Graham Hill.

Team Lotus is credited with making the mid-engine layout popular for IndyCars, developing the first monocoque Formula One chassis and integrating the engine and transaxle as chassis components. Team Lotus was among the pioneers in Formula One in adding wings and shaping the undersurface of the car to create downforce. It invented active suspension and was the first to move radiators to the sides of the car to improve aerodynamic performance.

Formula One Drivers' Championship winners for Lotus were Jim Clark in 1963 and 1965, Graham Hill in 1968, Jochen Rindt in 1970, Emerson Fittipaldi in 1972 and Mario Andretti in 1978. In 1973, Lotus won the constructors' championship only; the drivers' title went to Jackie Stewart of Tyrrell. Chapman saw Lotus beat Ferrari as the first marque to achieve 50 Grand Prix victories, even though Ferrari had won its first nine years sooner.

Until the late 1980s, Team Lotus continued to be a major player in Formula One. Ayrton Senna drove for the team from 1985 to 1987, winning twice in each year and achieving 17 pole positions.

Team Lotus established Classic Team Lotus in 1992, which continues to maintain Lotus F1 cars and run them in the FIA Historic Formula One Championship. It also preserves the Team Lotus archive and Works Collection of cars, under the management of Colin Chapman's son Clive.

Team Lotus's participation in Formula One ended after the 1994 season, when the team's cars were no longer competitive. Cars constructed by the team won a total of 79 Grand Prix races.

Former racing driver David Hunt (brother of F1 world champion James Hunt) purchased the name Team Lotus and licensed it to the Formula One team Pacific Racing, which was rebranded Pacific Team Lotus. The Pacific Team folded at the end of the 1995 season.

The Lotus name returned to Formula One for the 2010 season, when a new Malaysian team called Lotus Racing was awarded an entry. The new team used the Lotus name under licence from Group Lotus and was unrelated to the original Team Lotus. In September 2010 Group Lotus, with agreement from its parent company Proton, terminated the licence for future seasons as a result of what it called "flagrant and persistent breaches of the licence by the team." Lotus Racing then announced that it had acquired Team Lotus Ventures Ltd, the company led by David Hunt, and with it full ownership of the rights to the Team Lotus brand and heritage. The team confirmed that it would be known as Team Lotus from 2011 onward.

In December 2010, Group Lotus announced the creation of Lotus Renault GP, the successor to the Renault F1 team. This team contested the 2011 season having purchased a title sponsorship deal with the team, with the option to buy shares in the future. The team's car for that season, the R31, was badged as a Renault, while Team Lotus's car, the T128, was badged as a Lotus. In May 2011, the British High Court of Justice ruled that Team Lotus could continue to use the Team Lotus name, but Group Lotus had sole right to use the Lotus name. As a consequence, for 2012 Lotus Renault GP was rebranded as Lotus F1 Team and its entries were badged as Lotus cars, while Team Lotus was renamed Caterham F1 Team (after the sportscar manufacturer owned by team principal Tony Fernandes) and its cars were badged as Caterhams.

Group Lotus was also involved in several other categories of motorsport. It sponsored the KV team in the IndyCar Series and the ART team in the GP2 and GP3 Series in 2011 and 2012. After fielding underpowered and uncompetitive engines in the 2012 Indianapolis 500, in which drivers Jean Alesi and Simona de Silvestro were black-flagged after ten laps for failing to maintain a competitive pace, Lotus was released from its contract and did not participate in future seasons.

=== Racecars ===
Year	Car	Image	Category
1948	Lotus Mark I		Classic trial
1949	Lotus Mark II		Classic trial
1951	Lotus Mark III		Road racing
1952	Lotus Mark IV		Sports car
1952	Lotus Mark V	never built	Sports car
1952	Lotus Mark VI		Sports car
1954	Lotus Mark VIII		Sports car
1954	Lotus Mark IX		Sports car
1956	Lotus Eleven		Sports car
1957	Lotus Seven		Sports car
1958	Lotus 12		Formula One; Formula Two
1958	Lotus 15		Group 4
1958	Lotus 16		Formula One; Formula Two
1959	Lotus 17		Sports car
1960	Lotus 18		Formula One; Formula Two; Formula Junior
1960	Lotus 19		Group 4
1961	Lotus 20		Formula Junior
1961	Lotus 21		Formula One
1962	Lotus 22		Formula Junior
1962	Lotus 23		Group 4
1962	Lotus 24		Formula One
1962	Lotus 25		Formula One
1963	Lotus 23B		Group 4
1963	Lotus 27		Formula Junior
1963	Lotus 29		IndyCar
1963	Lotus Cortina		Group 2
1964	Lotus 30		Group 4
1964	Lotus 31		Formula Three
1964	Lotus 32		Formula Two; Formula 5000
1964	Lotus 33		Formula One
1964	Lotus 34		IndyCar
1965	Lotus 35		Formula Two; Formula Three
1965	Lotus 38		IndyCar
1966	Lotus 39		Tasman Series
1966	Lotus 41		Formula Two; Formula Three
1966	Lotus 43		Formula One
1966	Lotus 44		Formula One; Formula Two
1966	Lotus Cortina		Group 5
1967	Lotus 42		IndyCar
1967	Lotus 48		Formula One; Formula Two
1967	Lotus 49		Formula One
1967	Lotus 51		Formula Ford
1968	Lotus 49B		Formula One
1968	Lotus 55		Formula Three
1968	Lotus 56		IndyCar
1968	Lotus 58		Formula 2
1969	Lotus 59		Formula Two; Formula B Formula Three; Formula Ford
1969	Lotus 63		Formula One
1969	Lotus 64		IndyCar
1969	Lotus 69		Formula One; Formula Two; Formula Three; Formula Ford
1969	Lotus 70		Formula 5000
1970	Lotus 49C		Formula One
1970	Lotus 72		Formula One
1970	Lotus 72B		Formula One
1970	Lotus 72C		Formula One
1971	Lotus 56B		Formula One
1971	Lotus 72D		Formula One
1973	Lotus 72E		Formula One
1974	Lotus 76		Formula One
1976	Lotus 77		Formula One
1977	Lotus 78		Formula One
1978	Lotus 79		Formula One
1979	Lotus 80		Formula One
1980	Lotus 81		Formula One
1980	Lotus 81B		Formula One
1980	Lotus 86		Formula One
1981	Lotus 87		Formula One
1981	Lotus 88		Formula One
1982	Lotus 91		Formula One
1983	Lotus 92		Formula One
1983	Lotus 93T		Formula One
1984	Lotus 94T		Formula One
1984	Lotus 95T		Formula One
1985	Lotus 97T		Formula One
1986	Lotus 98T		Formula One
1987	Lotus 99T		Formula One
1988	Lotus 100T		Formula One
1989	Lotus 101		Formula One
1990	Lotus 102		Formula One
1991	Lotus 102B		Formula One
1992	Lotus 102D		Formula One
1992	Lotus 107		Formula One
1993	Lotus 107B		Formula One
1994	Lotus 107C		Formula One
1994	Lotus 109		Formula One
1995	Lotus 112	never built	Formula One
1996	Lotus 114		Group GT1
1997	Lotus Elise GT1 Turbo		Group GT1
1997	Lotus Elise GT1		Group GT1 LMGTP
2002	Lotus 119		Gravity racer
2007	Lotus Exige GT3		Group GT3
2010	Lotus T127		Formula One
2011	Lotus Evora Cup GT4		SRO GT4
2011	Lotus Evora GTE		LM GTE
2011	Lotus T125		Open-wheel race car
2011	Lotus T128		Formula One
2011	Lotus T128		LMP2
2012	Lotus 2-Eleven GT4 Supersport		SRO GT4
2012	Lotus E20		Formula One
2012	Lotus Exige R-GT		Group R-GT
2013	Lotus E21		Formula One
2014	Lotus E22		Formula One
2014	Lotus T129		LMP1-L
2015	Lotus E23 Hybrid		Formula One
2023	Lotus Emira GT4		SRO GT4
2024	Lotus 66		Group 7

== Lotus car models ==
=== Current ===
Current Lotus models include:

- Lotus Evija (Type 130) (2022 - present): Battery electric sports car
- Lotus Emira (Type 131) (2022 - present): Internal combustion sports car
- Lotus Eletre (Type 132) (2023 - present): Battery electric crossover SUV, first SUV by Lotus.
- Lotus Emeya (Type 133) (2024 - present): Battery electric grand tourer.

=== Previous ===
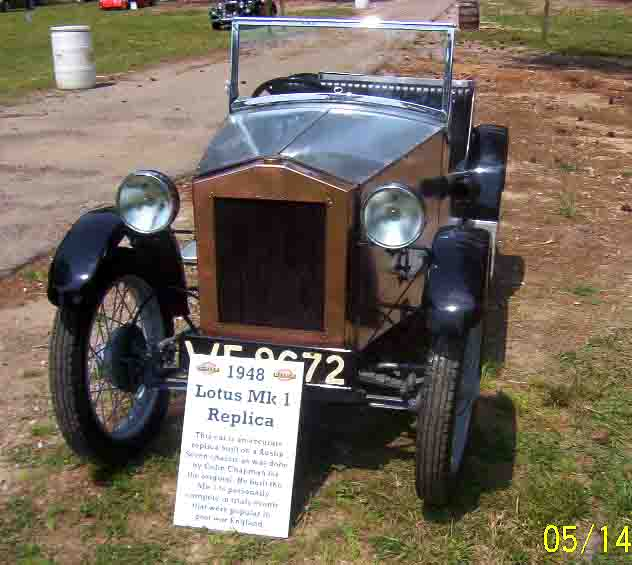
Lotus Mark I, 1948

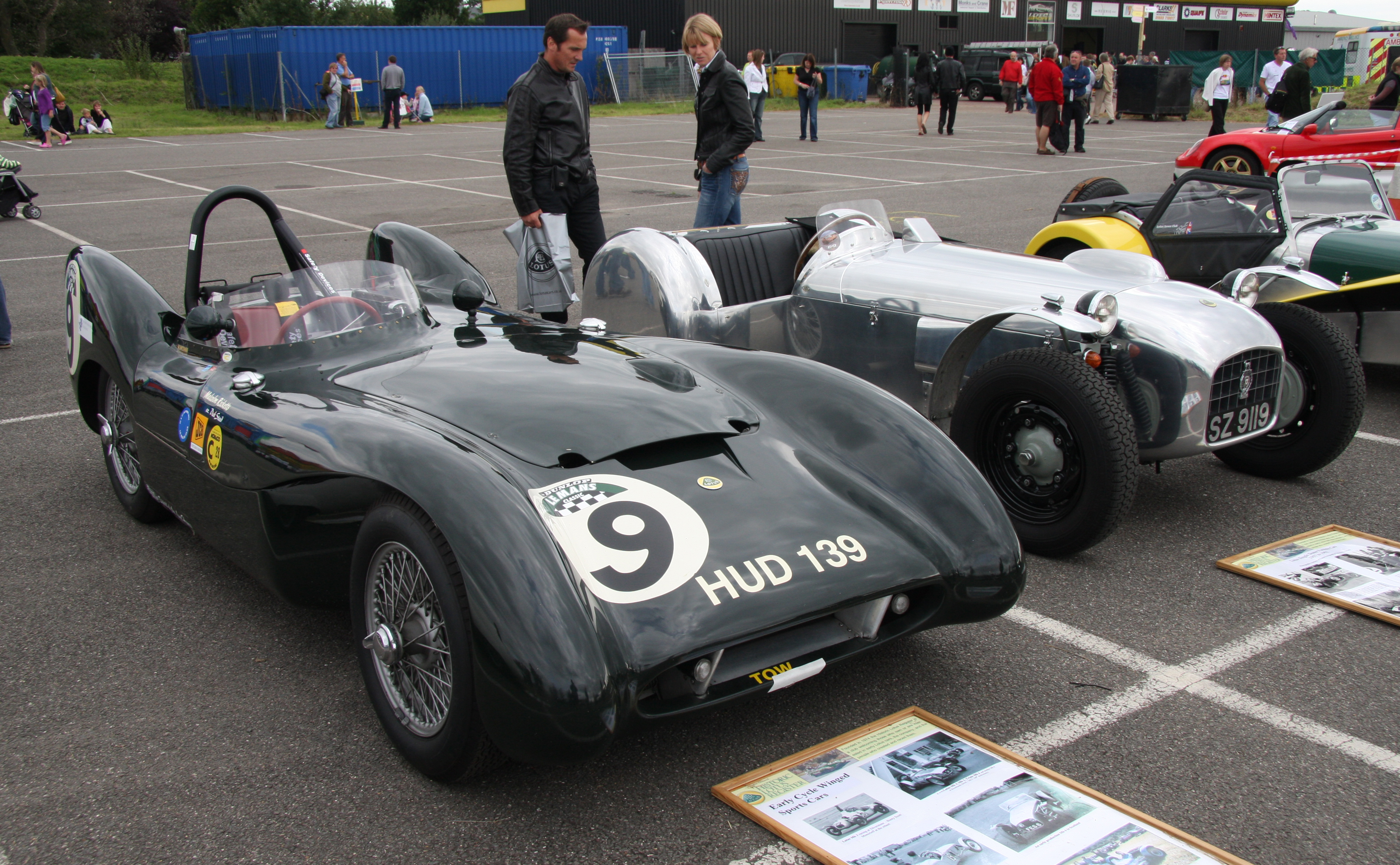
Lotus Mark IX and Lotus 6

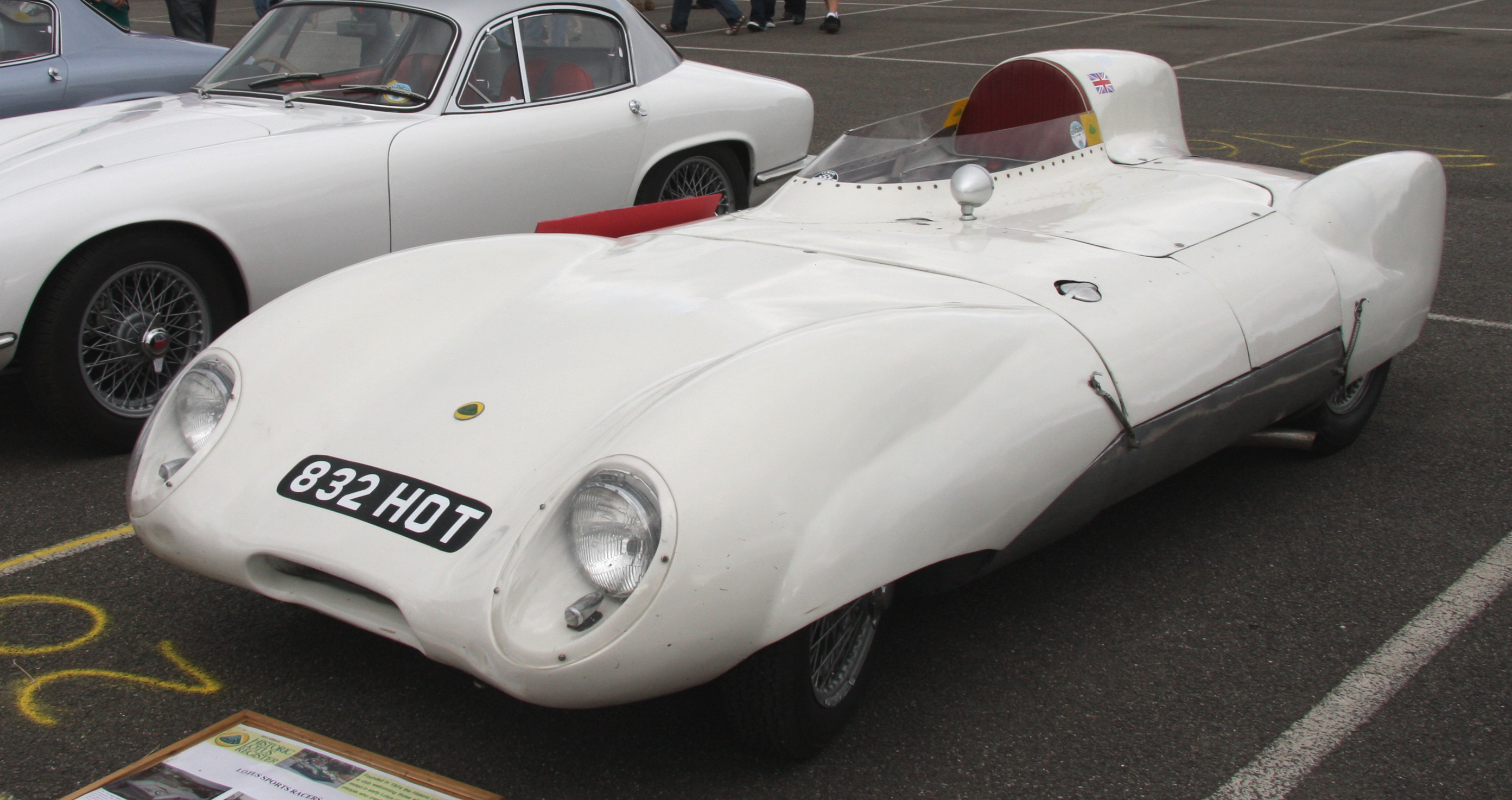
Lotus Eleven

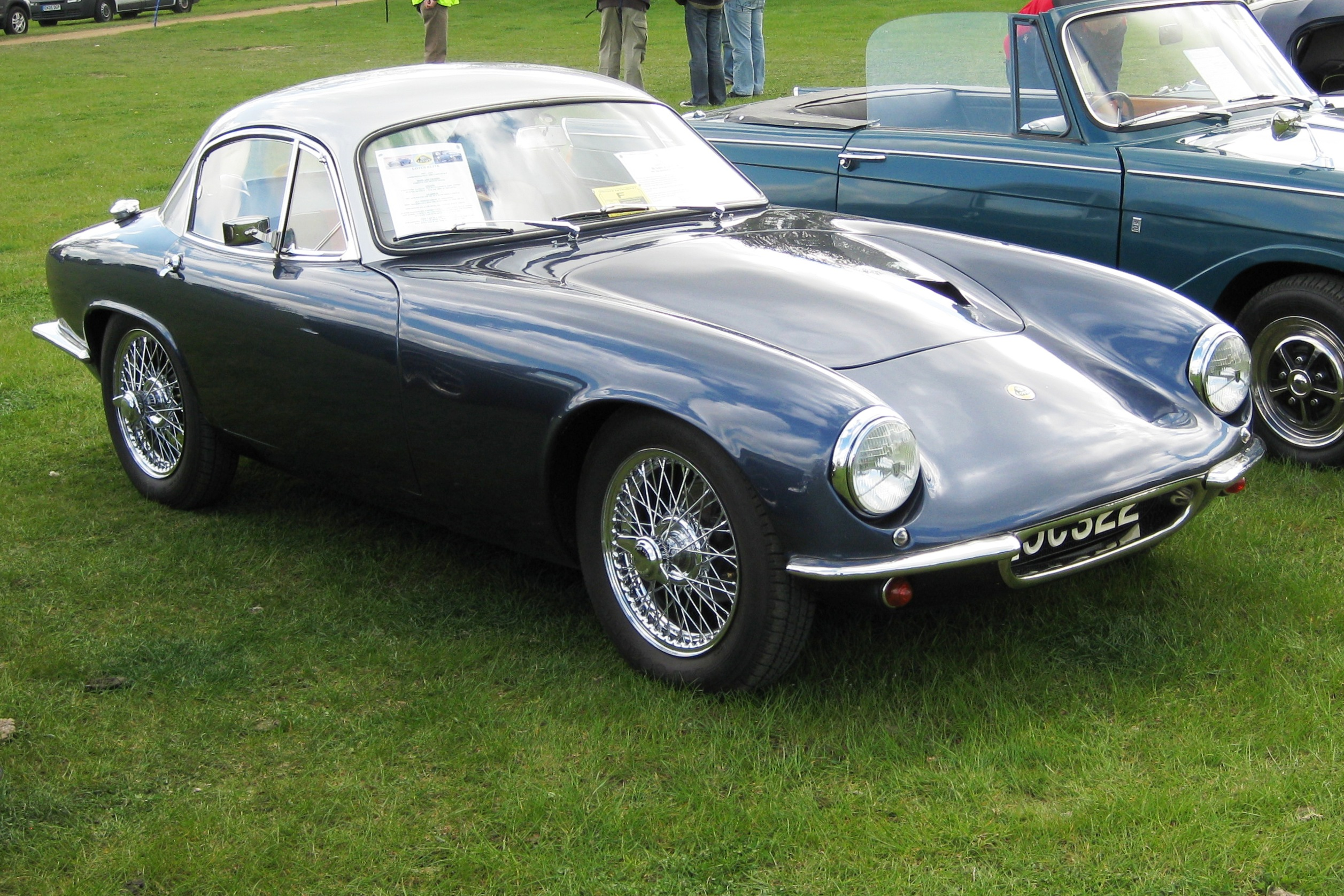
Lotus Elite

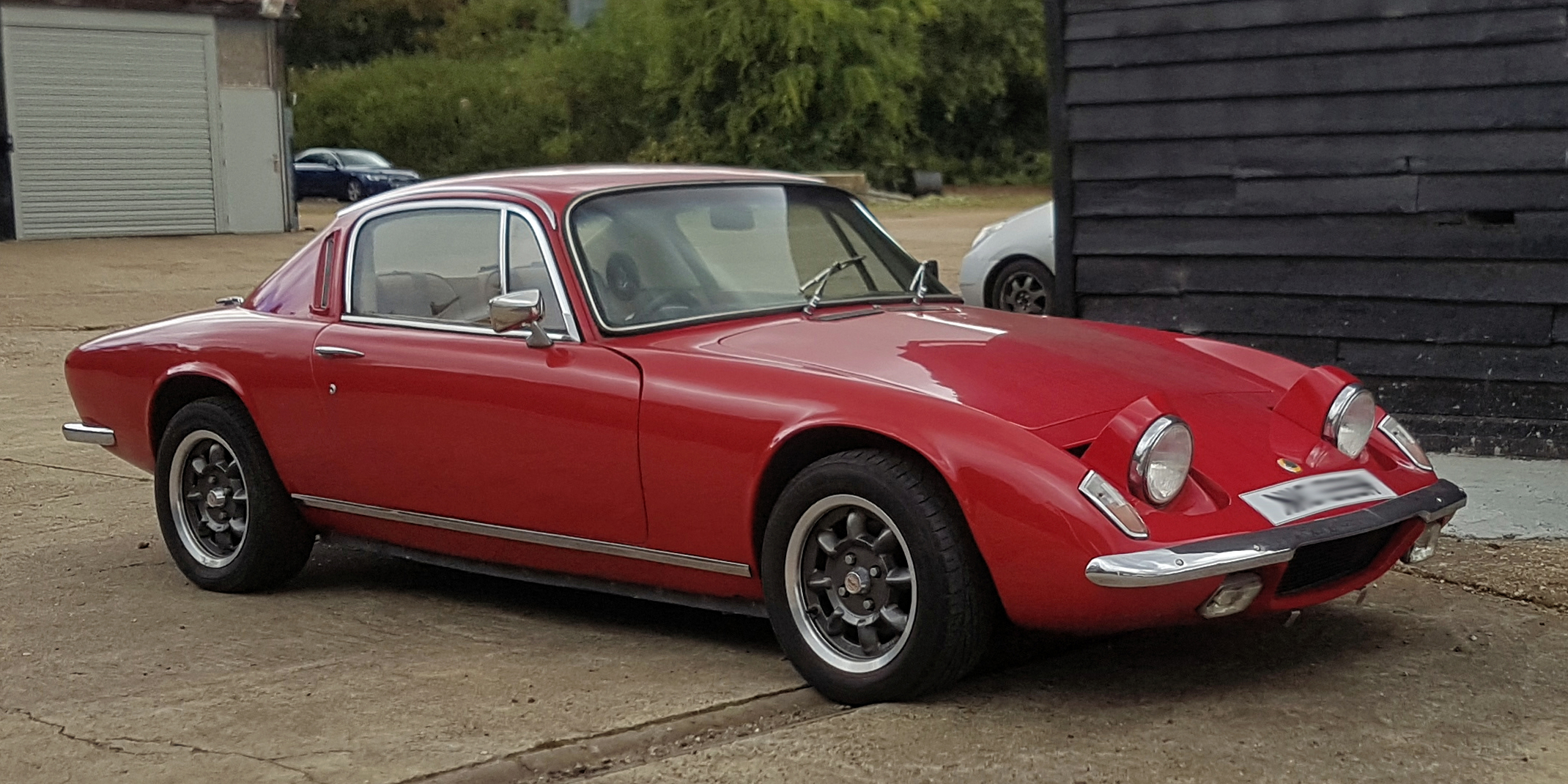
Lotus Elan +2S, 1973

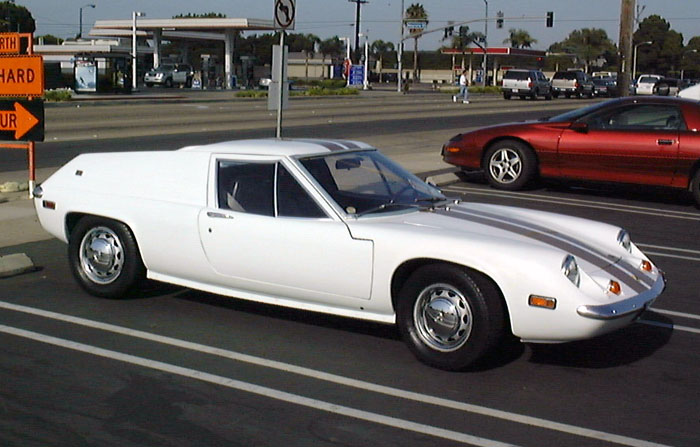
Lotus Europa S2

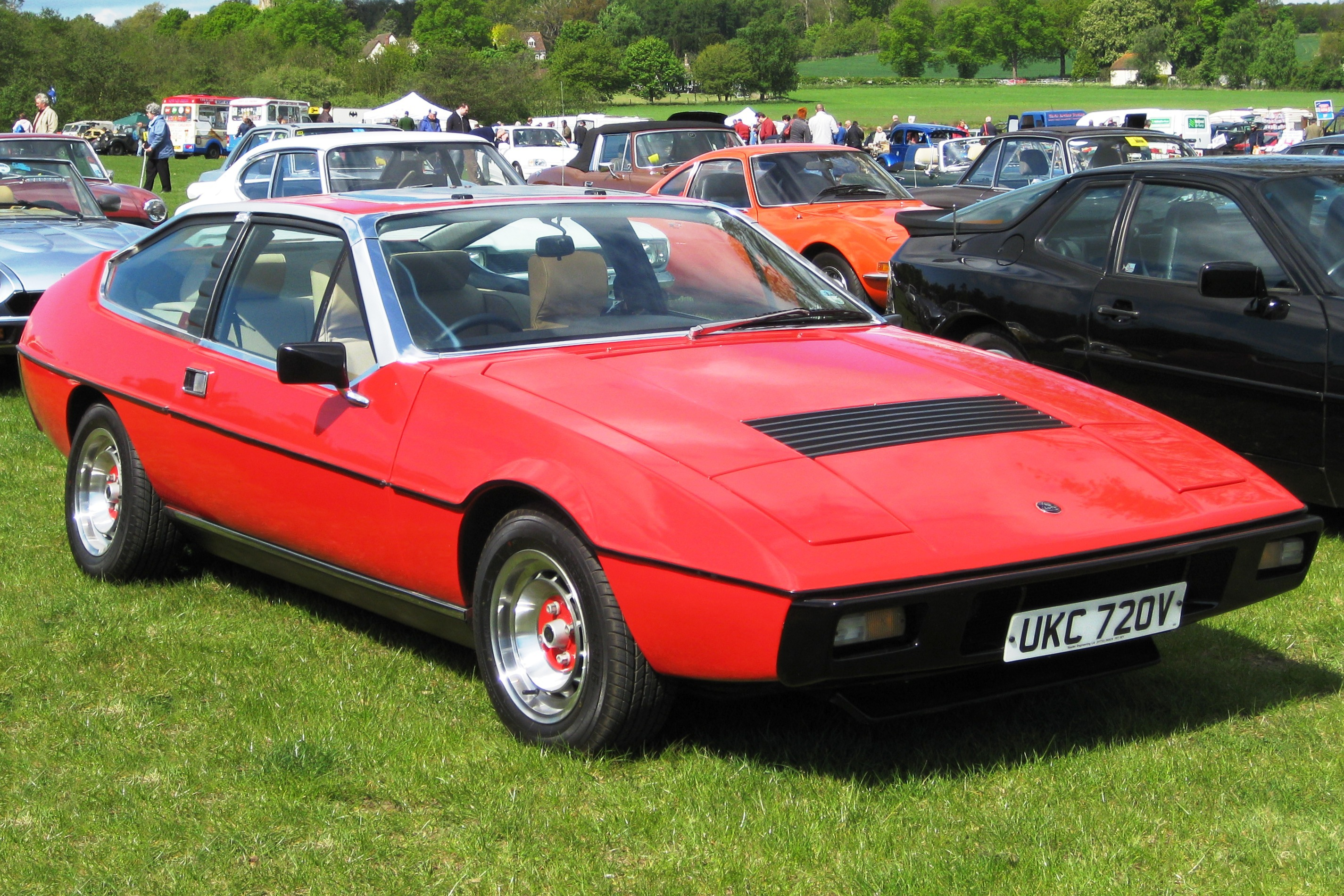
Lotus Eclat S2

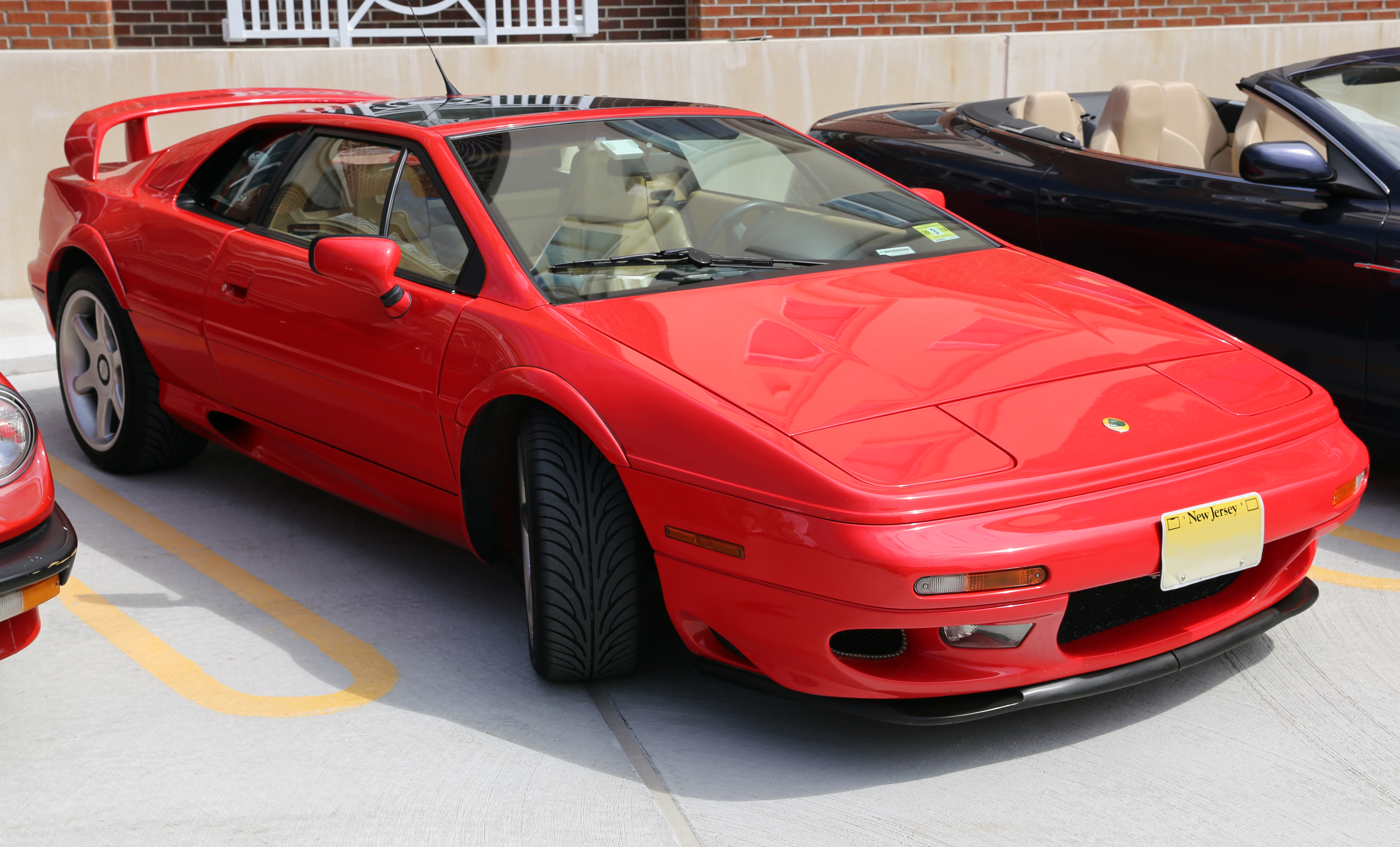
Lotus Esprit V8, 1999

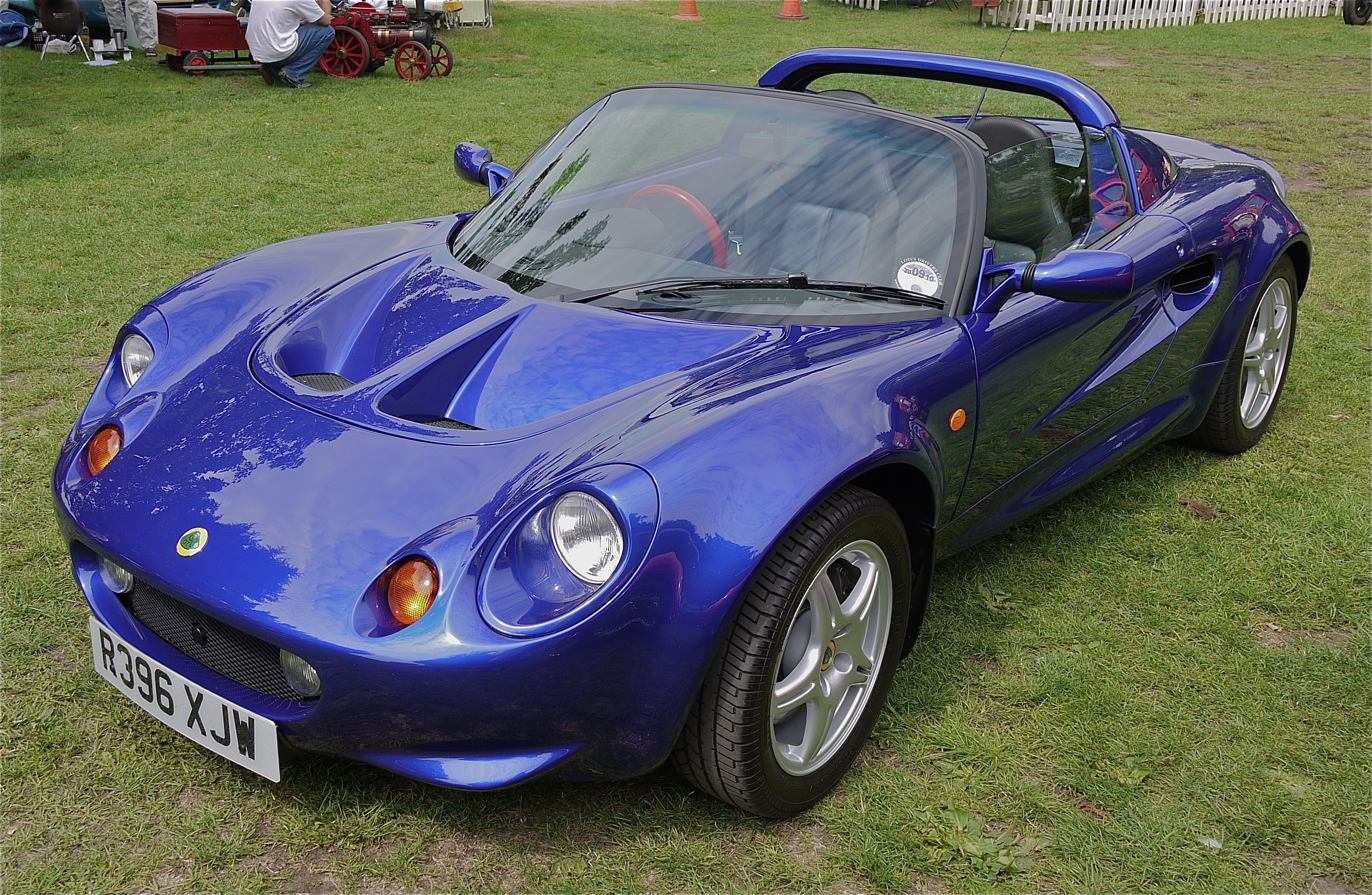
Lotus Elise S1

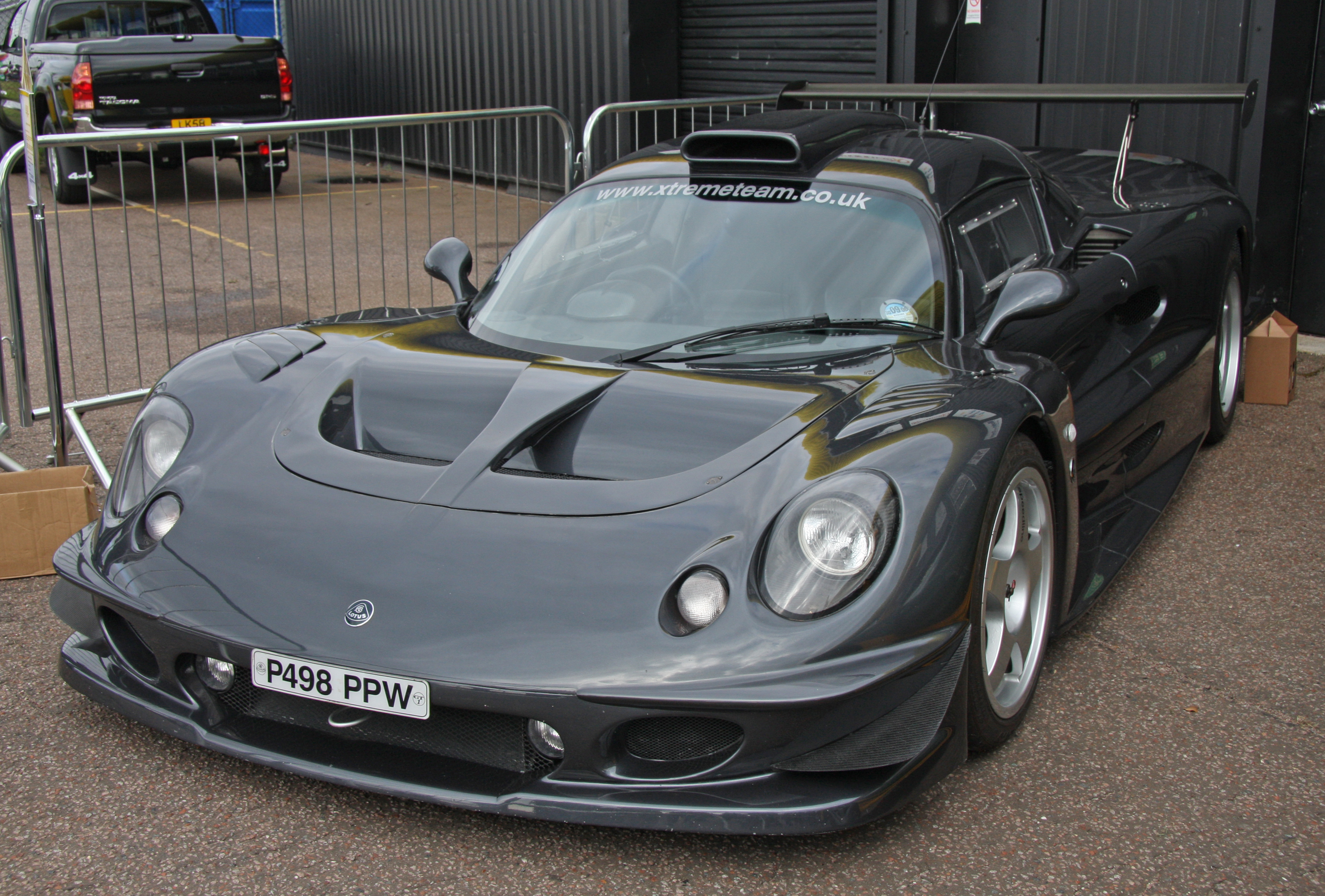
Lotus Elise GT1 Road Car, 1997

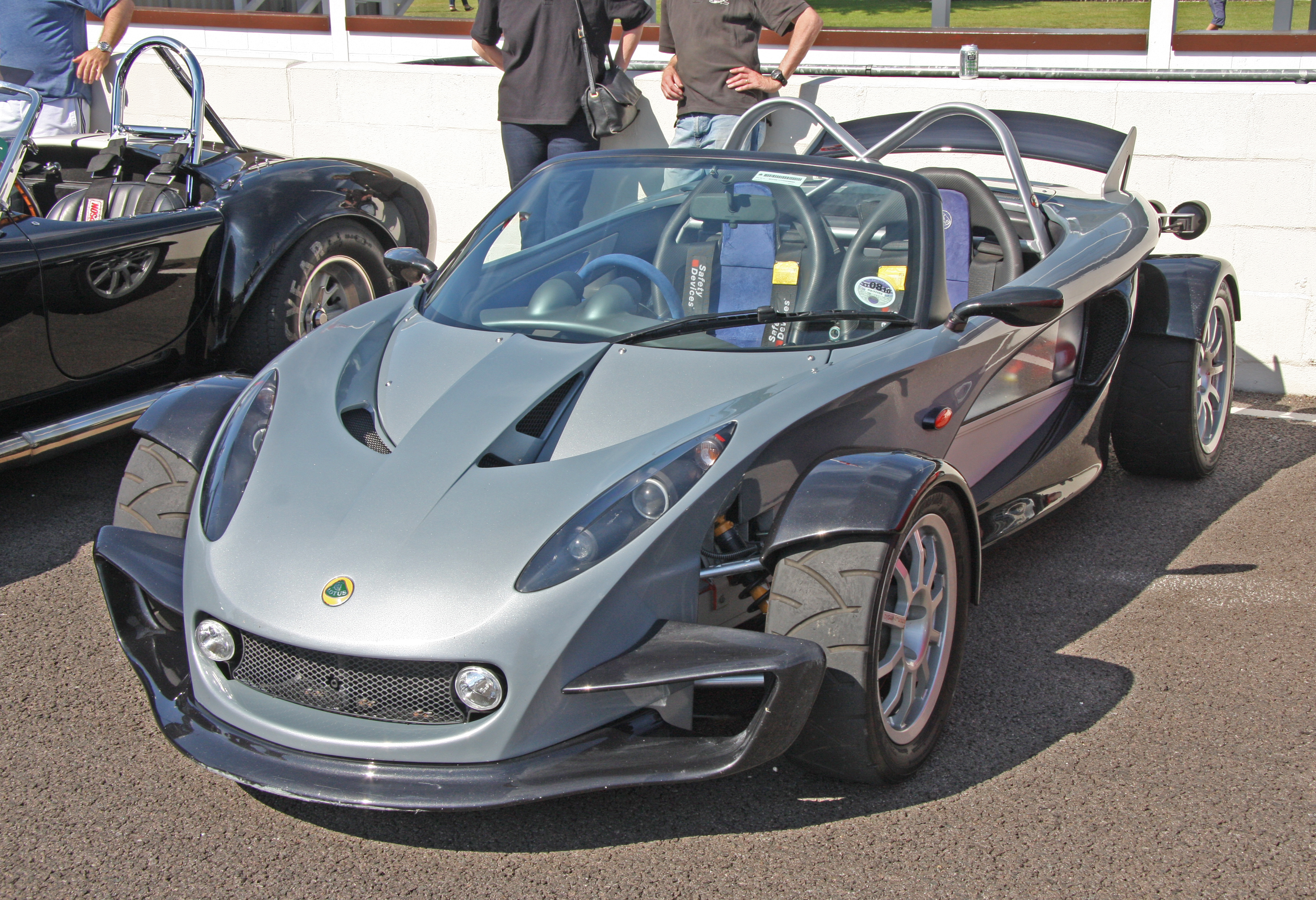
Lotus 340R

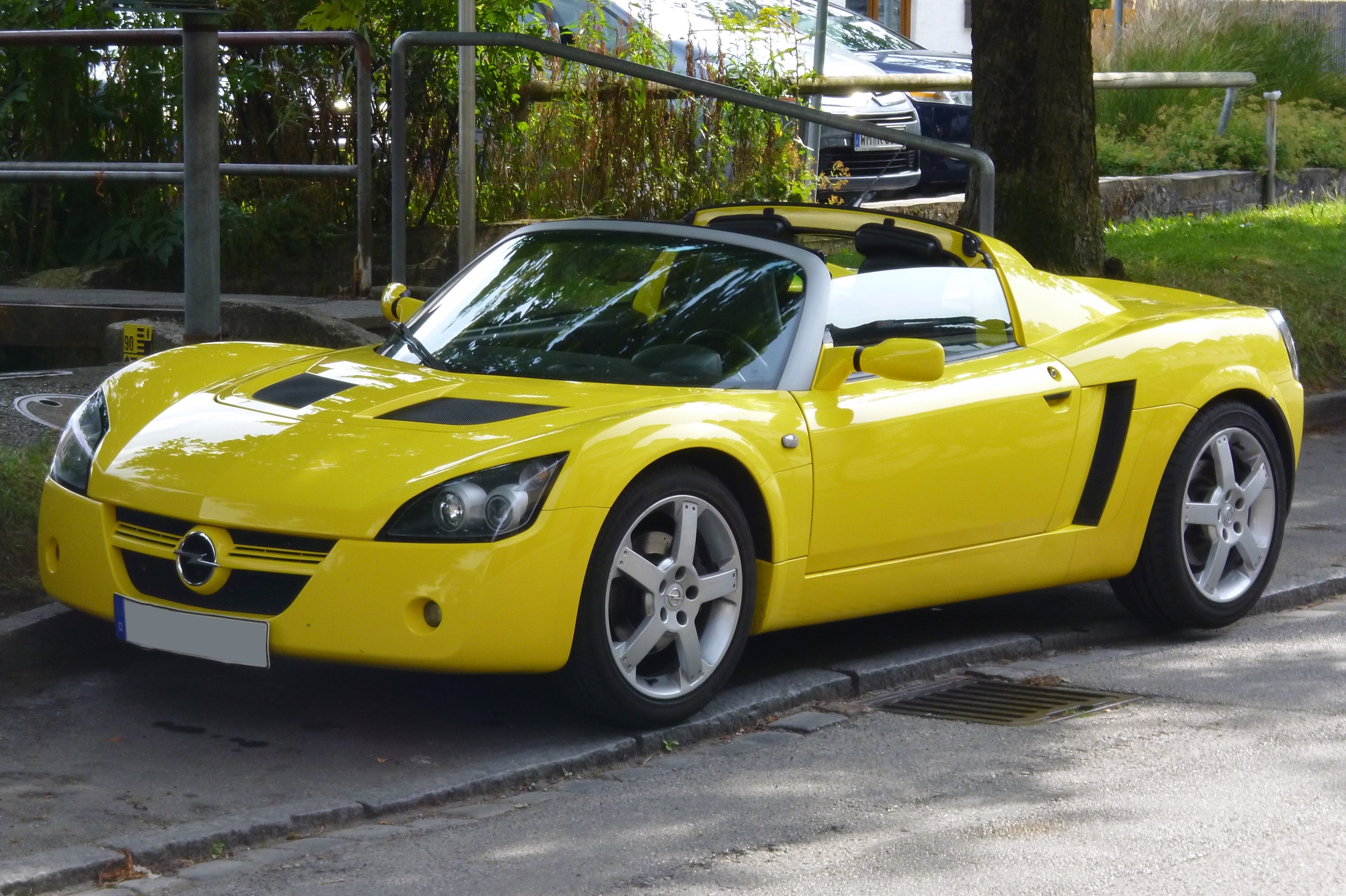
Opel Speedster/Vauxhall VX220 (based on the Lotus Elise S2)

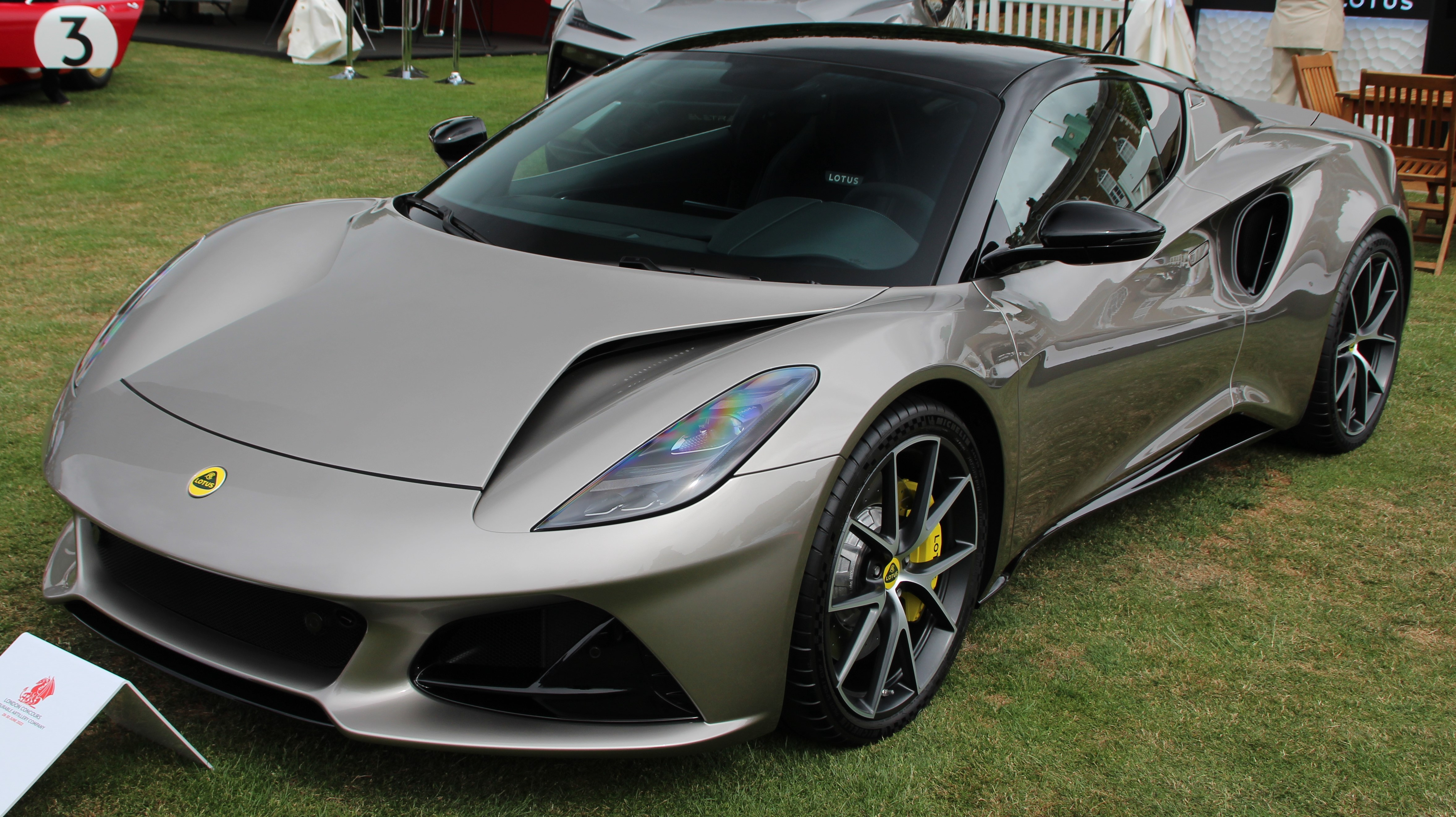
Lotus Emira

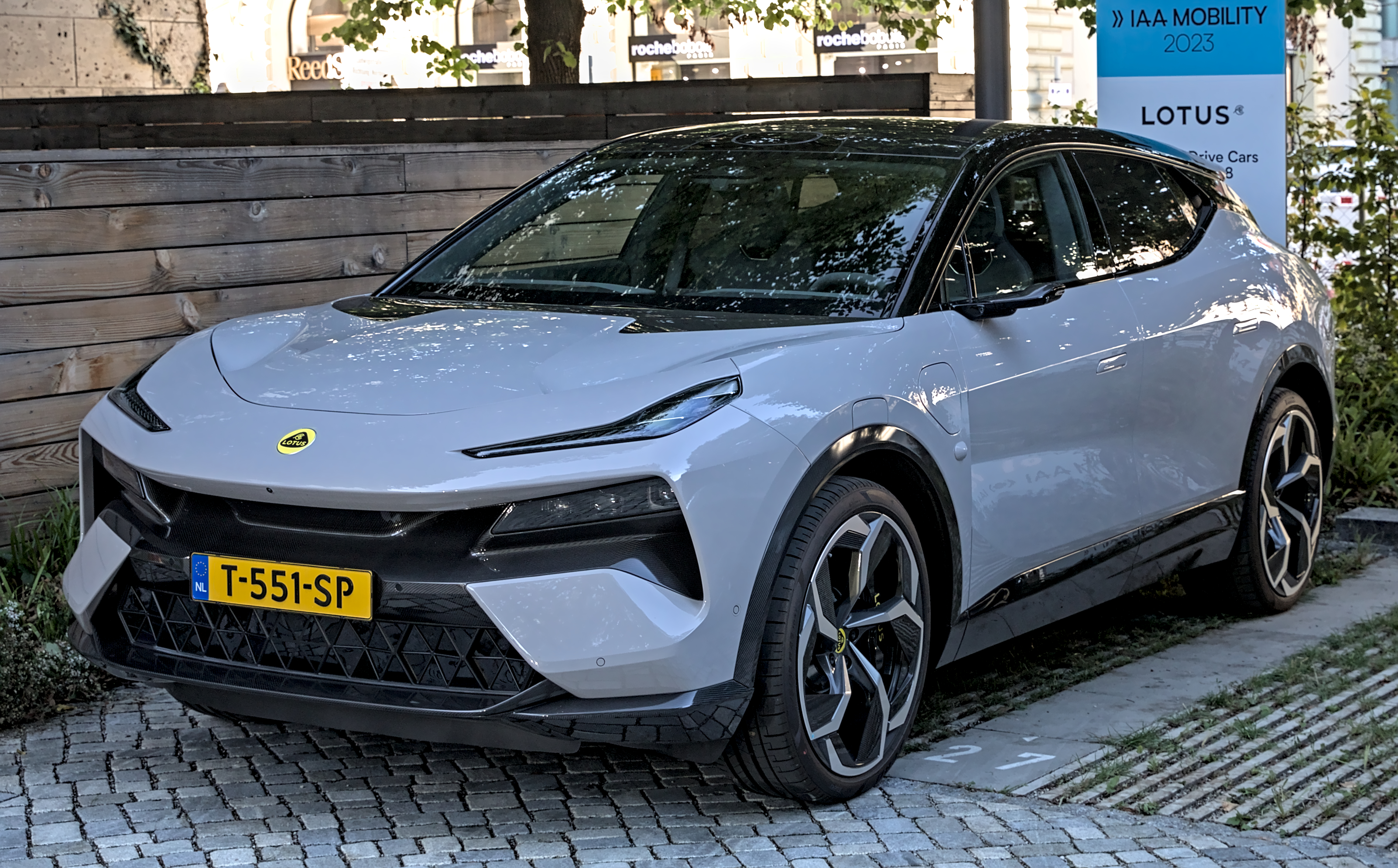
Lotus Eletre

- Lotus Mark I (1948): Austin 7–based sports car
- Lotus Mark II (1949–1950): Ford-powered trials car
- Lotus Mark III (1951): 750 cc formula car
- Lotus Mark IV (1952): Trials car
- Lotus Mark V (1952): 750 cc formula car, never built
- Lotus Mark VI (1953–1955): The first "production" racer, about 100 built
- Lotus Seven (1957–1972): A minimalist open sports car designed to manoeuvre a racing circuit.
- Lotus Mark VIII (1954): sports racer, MG 1.5 L
- Lotus Mark IX (1955): sports racer, shorter and improved Eight
- Lotus Mark X (1955): sports racer for larger displacement, Bristol/BMW 2 L
- Lotus Eleven (1956–1957): small displacement sports racer (750 – 1500 cc)
- Lotus 12 (1956–1957): Formula Two and Formula One racecar
- Lotus 13: Designation not used
- Lotus 14 (1957–1963): Lotus Elite, the first production street car
- Lotus 15 (1958–1960): Sports racer, update of the Mk.X, Climax 1.5 – 2.5 L
- Lotus 16 (1958–1959): F1/F2 car, "Miniature Vanwall"
- Lotus 17 (1959): Lighter sports racer update of the 11 in response to Lola Mk.I
- Lotus 18 (1960–1961): First mid-engined Lotus single seater—Formula Junior/F2/F1
- Lotus 19 (1960–1962): Mid-engined larger displacement sports racer, "Monte Carlo"
- Lotus 20 (1961): Formula Junior
- Lotus 21 (1961): Formula One
- Lotus 22 (1962–1965): Formula Junior/F3
- Lotus 23 (1962–1966): Small displacement mid-engined sports racer
- Lotus 24 (1962): Formula One
- Lotus 25 (1962–1964): Formula One World Champion
- Lotus 26 (1962–1971): Lotus Elan, production street sports car
- Lotus 26R (1962–1966): Racing version of Elan
- Lotus 27 (1963): Formula Junior
- Lotus 28 (1963–1966): Lotus version of the Ford Cortina street/racer
- Lotus 29 (1963): Indy car, Ford all-aluminium OHV small block V8
- Lotus 30 (1964): Large displacement sports racer (Ford small block V8)
- Lotus 31 (1964–1966): Formula Three space frame racer
- Lotus 32 (1964–1965): Monocoque F2 and Tasman Cup racer
- Lotus 33 (1964–1965): Formula One World Champion
- Lotus 34 (1964): Indy car, DOHC Ford V8
- Lotus 35 (1965): F2/F3/FB
- Lotus 36 (1965–1968): Elan Fixed Head Coupe (Type 26 could be fitted with a removable hard top)
- Lotus 37 (1965): Sports racer
- Lotus 38 (1965): Indy winning mid-engined car
- Lotus 39 (1965–1966): Tasman Cup formula car
- Lotus 40 (1965): Sports racer, a development of the 30
- Lotus 41 (1965–1968): Formula Three, Formula Two, Formula B
- Lotus 42 (1967): Indy car, Ford V8
- Lotus 43 (1966): Formula One
- Lotus 44 (1967): Formula Two
- Lotus 45 (1966–1974): Convertible (Drop Head Coupe) Elan with permanent side window frames.
- Lotus 46 (1966–1968): Original Renault-engined Europa
- Lotus 47 (1966–1970): Racing version of Europa
- Lotus 48 (1967): Formula Two
- Lotus 49 (1967–1969): Formula One World Champion
- Lotus 50 (1967–1974): Lotus Elan +2, four-seat production car
- Lotus 51 (1967–1969): Formula Ford
- Lotus 52 (1968): Prototype Europa Twin Cam
- Lotus 53 (1968): Small displacement sports racer, never built
- Lotus 54 (1968–1970): Series 2 'Europa' production car
- Lotus 55 (1968): F3
- Lotus 56 (1968–1969): Indy turbine wedge
- Lotus 56B (1971): F1 turbine wedge
- Lotus 57 (1968): F1 design study
- Lotus 58 (1968): F2 design study, tested once by Graham Hill
- Lotus 59 (1969–1970): F2/F3/Formula Ford
- Lotus LX (1960): Lotus Elite built to win at Le Mans with a 2.0 L FPF engine
- Lotus 60 (1970–1973): Lotus Seven S4, Greatly modified version of the Seven
- Lotus 61 (1969): Formula Ford, "the wedge"
- Lotus 62 (1969): prototype Europa racer
- Lotus 63 (1969): 4-wheel drive F1
- Lotus 64 (1969): 4-wheel drive Indy car, did not compete
- Lotus 65 (1969–1971): Federalized Europa S2
- Lotus 66 (2024): track day car based on a 1969 Can-Am study
- Lotus 67 (1970): Proposed Tasman Cup car, never built
- Lotus 68 (1969): F5000 prototype
- Lotus 69 (1970): F2/F3/Formula Ford
- Lotus 70 (1970): F5000/Formula A
- Lotus 71: Undisclosed design study
- Lotus 72 (1970–1972): Formula One World Champion
- Lotus 73 (1972–1973): F3
- Lotus 74 - Texaco Star (1973): F2, redundant designation
- Lotus 74 (1971–1975): Europa Twin Cam production car, redundant designation
- Lotus 75 (1974–1982): Elite II, Luxury 4-seat GT
- Lotus 76 (1974): F1, redundant designation
- Lotus 76 (1975–1982): Éclat S1, fastback version of Elite II, redundant designation
- Lotus 77 (1976): F1
- Lotus 78 (1977–1978): F1 ground effects car
- Lotus 79 (1975–1980) Lotus Esprit, street GT, redundant designation
- Lotus 79 (1978–1979): Formula One World Champion, redundant designation
- Lotus 80 (1979): F1
- Lotus 81 (1979–1980): Sunbeam Talbot Lotus, redundant designation
- Lotus 81 (1980–1981): F1, redundant designation
- Lotus 82 (1982–1987): Turbo Esprit, street GT car
- Lotus 83 (1980): Elite series 2
- Lotus 84 (1980–1982): Éclat series 2
- Lotus 85 (1980–1987): Esprit series 3
- Lotus 86 (1980–1983): F1 dual chassis, never raced
- Lotus 87 (1980–1982): F1
- Lotus 88 (1981): F1 dual chassis car, banned
- Lotus 89 (1982–1992): Lotus Excel GT, re-engineered Éclat
- Lotus 90 (1984): Lotus M90/X100 Toyota-based "new Elan", abandoned in favour of the Elan M100
- Lotus 91 (1982): F1
- Lotus 92 (1983): F1
- Lotus 93T (1983): F1 Turbo
- Lotus 94T (1983): F1 Turbo
- Lotus 95T (1984): F1 Turbo
- Lotus 96T (1984): Indy car project, abandoned
- Lotus 97T (1985–1986): F1 Turbo
- Lotus 98T (1986–1987): F1 Turbo
- Lotus 99T (1987): F1 Turbo, last original Team Lotus F1 winner
- Lotus 100 (1989–1995): Lotus Elan M100 front-drive convertible
- Lotus 100T (1988): F1 Turbo
- Lotus 101 (1989): F1
- Lotus 102 (1990–1991): F1
- Lotus 103 (1990): F1, not produced
- Lotus 104 (1990–1992): Lotus Carlton/Omega, tuned version of the Opel/Vauxhall saloon
- Lotus 105 (1990): Esprit X180R, IMSA Supercars Drivers Champ (Doc Bundy)
- Lotus 106 (1991): Esprit X180R modified
- Lotus 107 (1992–1994): F1
- Lotus 108 (1992): a track only bike ridden by Chris Boardman to win a gold medal at the 1992 Barcelona Olympics, also known as the "LotusSport Pursuit Bicycle"
- Lotus 109 (1994): F1, Last original Team Lotus F1 car.
- Lotus 110 : Road and TT bike. Often mistaken for the Lotus 108 but completely different bikes
- Lotus 111 (1996–2022): Lotus Elise, Lotus Exige, Lotus 340R
- Lotus 112: Partial F1 design, reached as far as the monocoque buck
- Lotus 113: Number not allocated
- Lotus 114 (1996): Lotus Esprit GT1 race car
- Lotus 115 (1997–1998): Lotus Elise GT1
- Lotus 116: Opel Speedster/Vauxhall VX220, a collaboration with Opel
- Lotus 117 (2001–2004): Elise S2 with Rover engines
- Lotus 118: Lotus M250, two-seat mid-range sports car concept unveiled in Autumn of 1999, project cancelled in 2001
- Lotus 119 (2002): Soapbox Derby car made of carbon and aluminium, disc brakes, no engine, for Goodwood Festival of Speed
- Lotus 120 (2005–2022): Elise S2 with Toyota engines
- Lotus 121 (2006–2010): Lotus Europa S
- Lotus 122 (2010–2022): Lotus Evora
- Lotus 123 (2007–2022): Lotus 2-Eleven, Lotus 3-Eleven speedster
- Lotus 124: Evora race car
- Lotus T125 (2010): Lotus Exos
- Lotus 126: Number not allocated
- Lotus T127 (2010): Team Lotus F1 car, made for 2010 season
- Lotus T128 (Formula One car) (2011): Team Lotus F1 car, made for 2011 season
- Lotus T128 (Le Mans Prototype) (2013): race car built for 24 Hours of LeMans
- Lotus T129 (2014): CLM P1/01 race car
- Lotus E20 (2012): Lotus F1 Team F1 car, made for 2012 season
- Lotus E21 (2013): Lotus F1 Team F1 car, made for 2013 season
- Lotus E22 (2014): Lotus F1 Team F1 car, made for 2014 season
- Lotus E23 (2015): Lotus F1 Team F1 car, made for 2015 season

=== Announcements of future cars ===
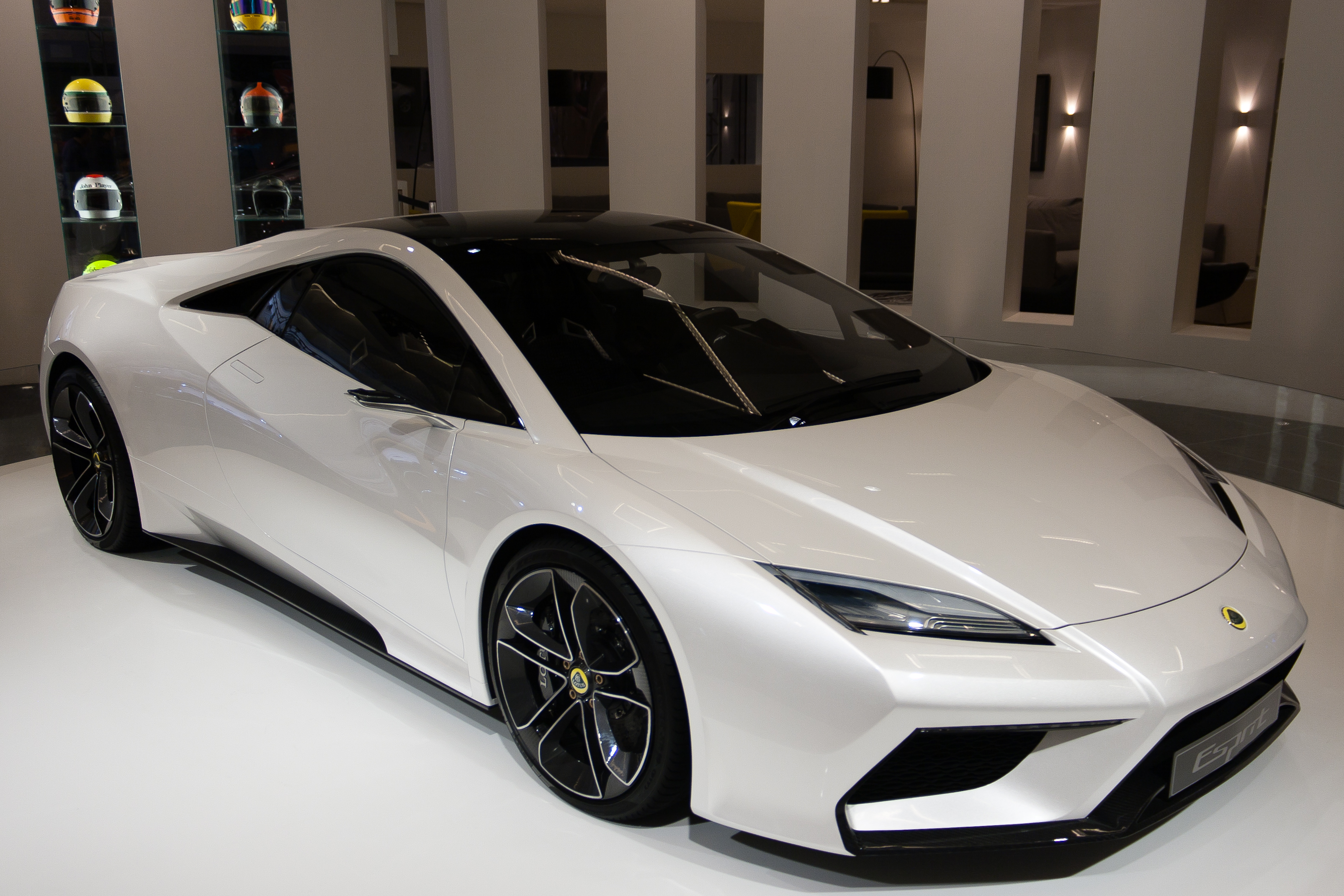
Proposed new Lotus Esprit (announced 2010 but subsequently cancelled)

At the 2010 Paris Motorshow, Lotus announced five new models to be introduced over the next five years: Their intention was to replace the Elise with an entirely different model, as well as to introduce two entirely new sports coupes, which would have been known as the Elite and the Elan, a new sports saloon, the Eterne, to rival the Aston Martin Rapide and Maserati Quattroporte, and a modern interpretation of the Esprit supercar.

It became apparent in July 2012 that the firm's financial difficulties had made this plan impossible to implement, and initially all but the Esprit project were cancelled. Subsequently, the Esprit project was also cancelled.

Lotus also showed an unnamed city car concept using its 1.2L range-extender engine. In 2011, Lotus revealed this as the Lotus Ethos, a plug-in hybrid car based on the EMAS concept from its parent company Proton, and likely to be primarily built by Proton in Malaysia. This car has also been cancelled.

Lotus CEO at the time Jean Marc Gales confirmed in 2017 that development of an SUV is currently under way, after the company was acquired by the Chinese automotive manufacturer, Geely.

In July 2019 Lotus revealed the Evija, a 1,470 kW (2,000 PS; 1,970 hp) and 1,700 N⋅m (1,254 lb⋅ft) electric supercar.

In January 2021, Lotus teased that the Elise, Exige, and Evora would be discontinued and be replaced by the Type 131 which had yet to be released at the time of announcement. In July 2021, Lotus revealed that this new model is called Emira.

In November 2021, Lotus teased the future introduction of the future Type 132 SUV, later named as Eletre.

In September 2023, Lotus announced the Emeya, the company's first electric GT car.

The Lotus Theory 1 is a electric sports car concept revealed on 16 September 2024.

In May 2026, Lotus revealed the Type 135. The design of the car looks to be heavily based off the Lotus Theory 1 concept in 2024, but will be powered by a V8 Twin-Turbocharged Hybrid engine developing around 1000HP. The engine is likely to be a Horse Powertrain unit. The Type 135 is rumoured to be named Lotus Esprit, resurrecting the sports car which was produced between 1976-2004.

== Lotus engines ==
- Lotus-Ford Twin Cam
- Lotus 900 series
  - Lotus 907
  - Lotus 910
  - Lotus 911
  - Lotus 912
  - Lotus 920
  - Lotus 918
- Range Extender Engine. This all-aluminium, monoblock, 1200 cc, three-cylinder, 47 horsepower, four-stroke engine is specifically designed to directly drive an alternator for electricity generation for series-hybrid cars. The engine is small and light at 56 kg (123 lb), having three cylinders and no detachable cylinder head. The cylinder head and engine block are all one casting to reduce size, weight and production costs. As the engine does not turn belt driven ancillaries such as alternator, power-steering pump or an air conditioning compressor, the block requires no strong points to accommodate such ancillaries, resulting in a simple and light block. The engine has a reduced parts count for lightness and cheaper production.
- On 18 August 2011 Lotus developed an all new in-house designed V8 destined for the new era range of cars. At 170 kg (375 lb) and just 612 mm (24.1 in) long, the unit is dry sump lubricated to save depth and will feature a 180° flat plane crank. The engine is being utilised as a stressed component, a technique pioneered by Colin Chapman in F1, specifically with the 1967 Type 49. It was expected to be used in the Le Mans LMP2 car in 2012. Expected performance is likely to be in excess of 590 PS (434 kW; 582 hp) and with a 9,200 rpm redline.
- Lotus Omnivore, research engine and prototype.

== Lotus Engineering ==
Lotus Engineering Limited is an offshoot of Lotus Cars, which provides engineering consultancy to third-party companies primarily in the automotive industry. As well as Hethel in the United Kingdom Lotus has engineering centres in Ann Arbor, USA, Kuala Lumpur, Malaysia and Shanghai, China. In 2000, Lotus Engineering, Inc. was established with an office in Ann Arbor, Michigan.

=== Engineering demonstrators ===
- Lotus Eco Elise is an engineering demonstrator of its classic sports car that incorporates solar panels into a roof made from hemp, while also employing natural materials in the body and interior of the car.
- Lotus Exige 265E Bio-fuel
- Lotus Exige 270E Tri-fuel
- Lotus Evora 414E Hybrid. Shown at the 2010 Geneva Motor show
- Lotus Concept City Car. Shown at the 2010 Paris motor show.

=== APX and VVA ===
The APX (also known as the "Aluminium Performance Crossover") is an aluminium concept vehicle revealed at the 2006 Geneva Motor Show built on Lotus Engineering's Versatile Vehicle Architecture (VVA).

Whereas the VVA technology was to be used in the development of a new mid-engine sportscar for Lotus cars, the APX is, in fact, a high-performance 7-seat MPV with four-wheel drive and a front-mounted V6 engine from Lotus Engineering's Powertrain division. The engine was designed and developed to be available in a 2.2-litre naturally aspirated and 3.0-litre supercharged variations. An electric version was also shown in the 2007 NADA show.

Versatile Vehicle Architecture (VVA) is an effort by the Lotus car manufacturing company to reduce the investment needed for producing unique, niche-market cars by sharing a number of common components.

Cars produced using VVA:

- Lotus APX

=== Projects undertaken by Lotus Engineering ===
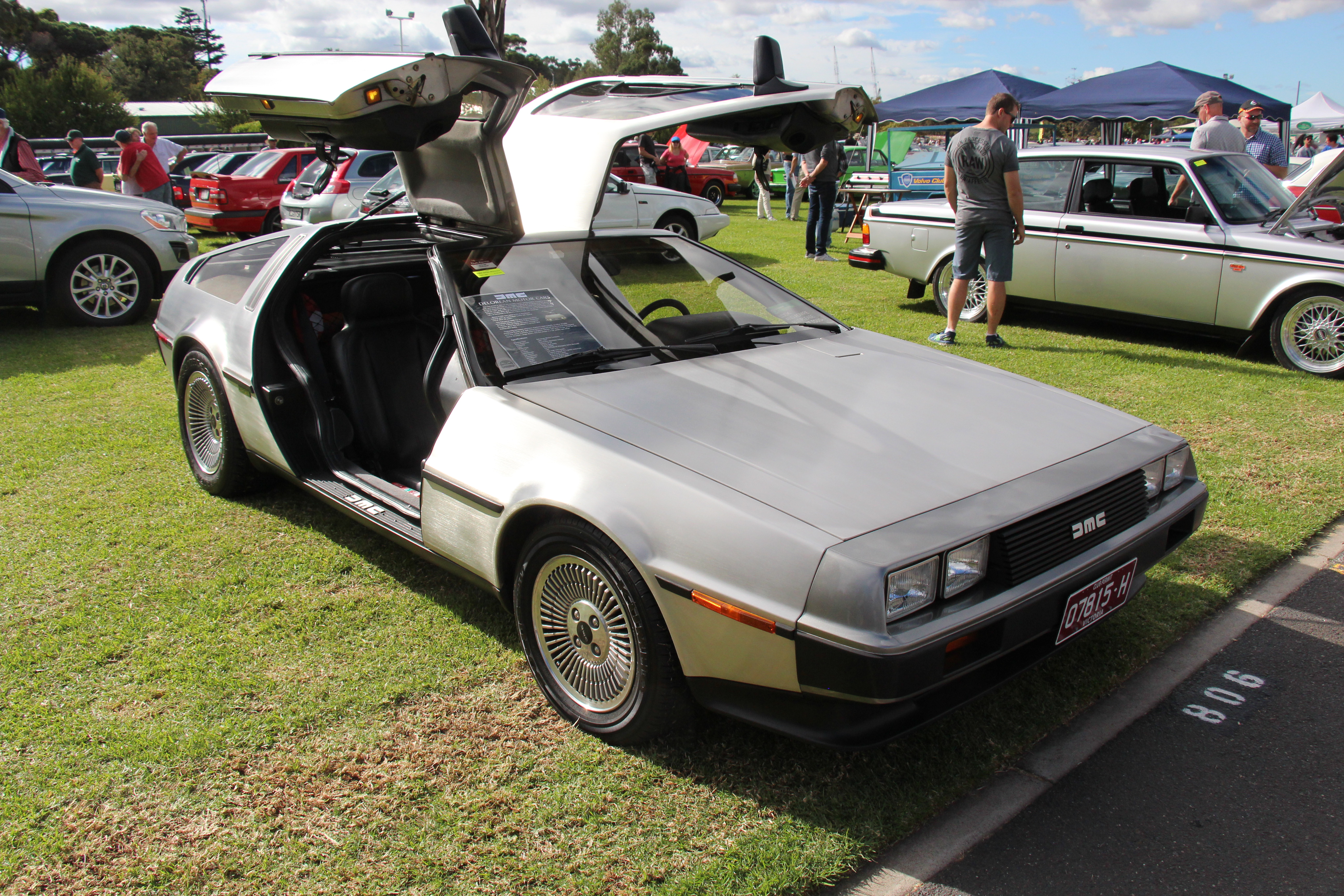
DeLorean with Lotus designed chassis

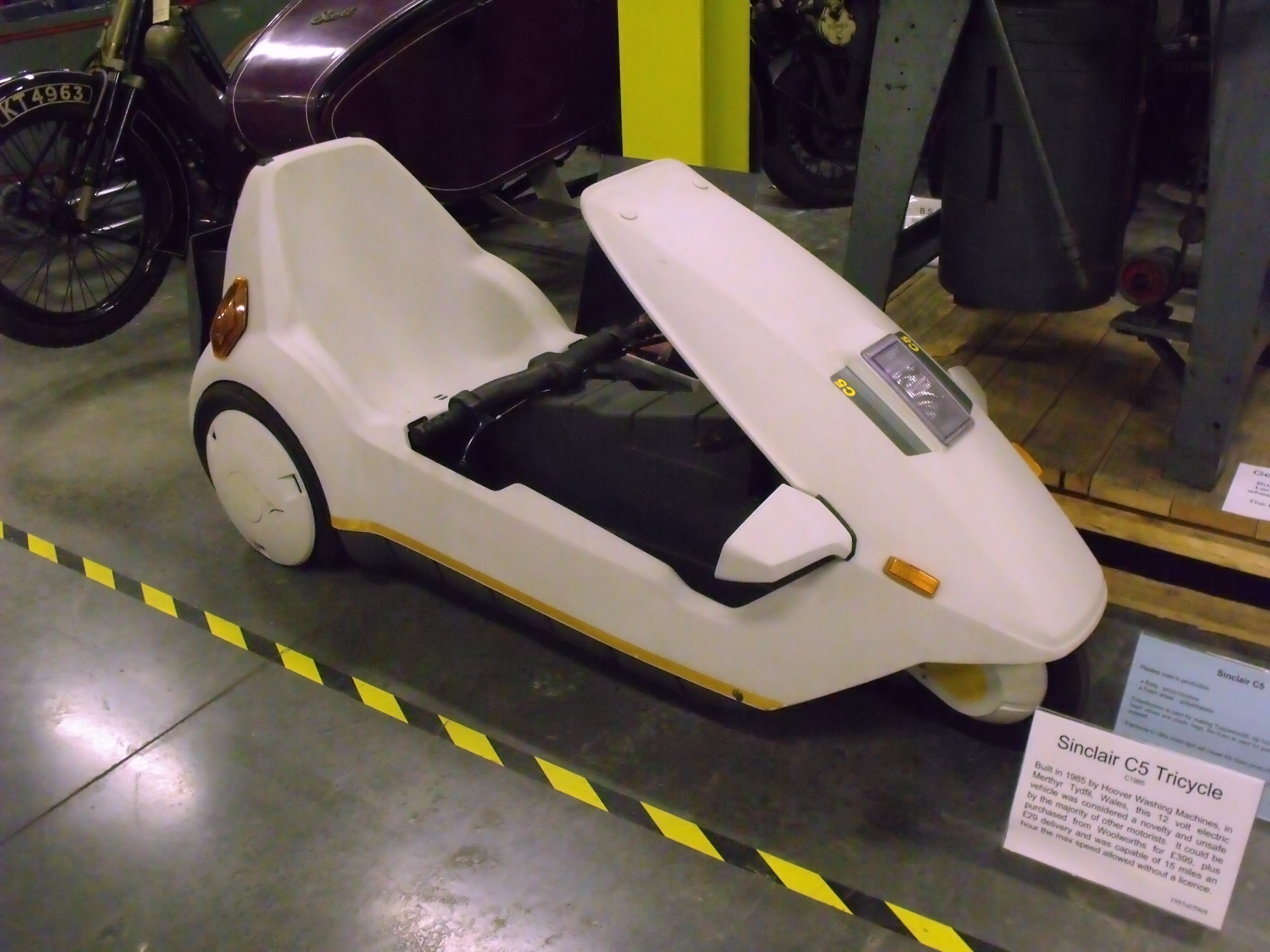
Sinclair C5

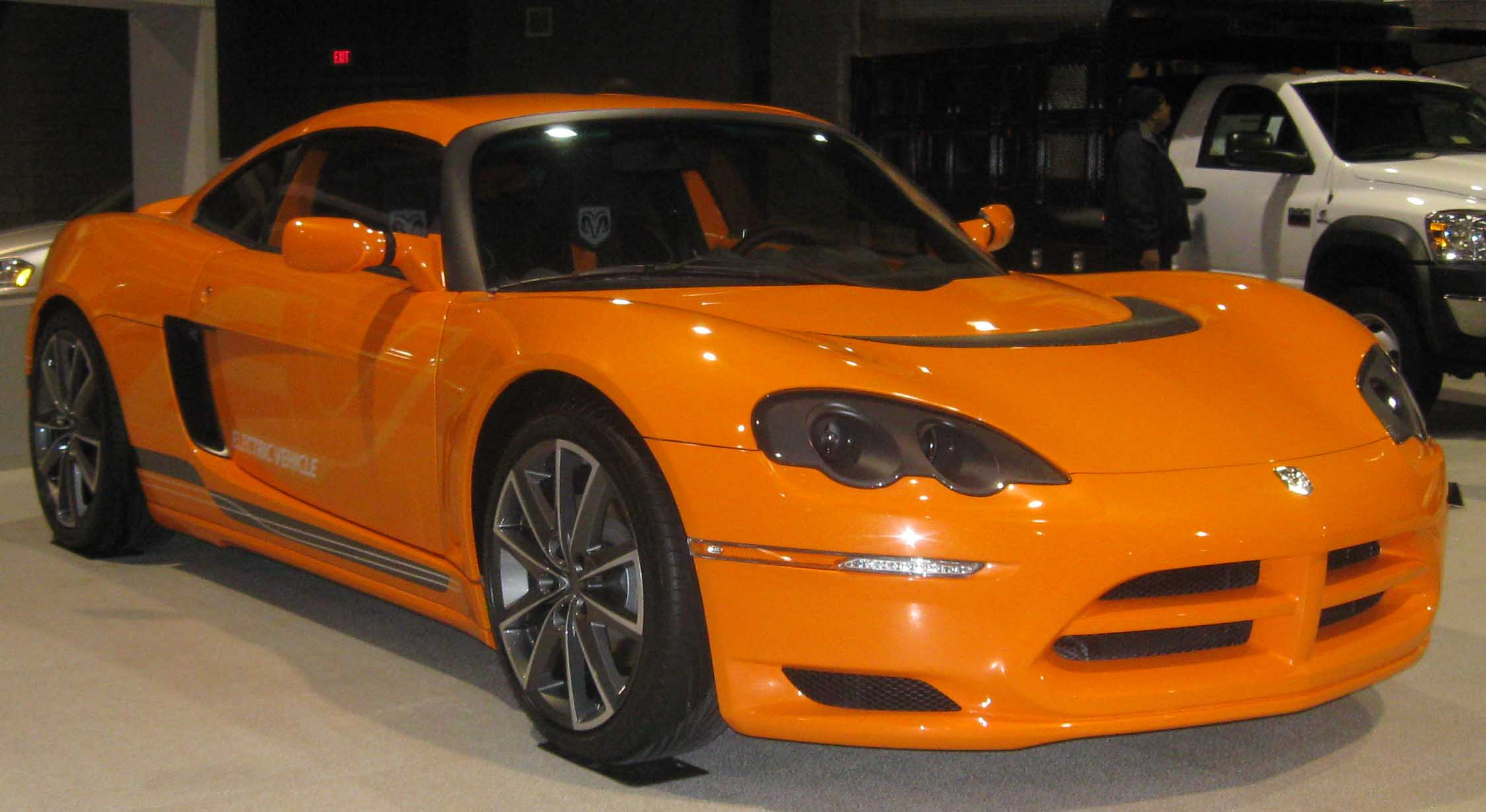
Dodge EV

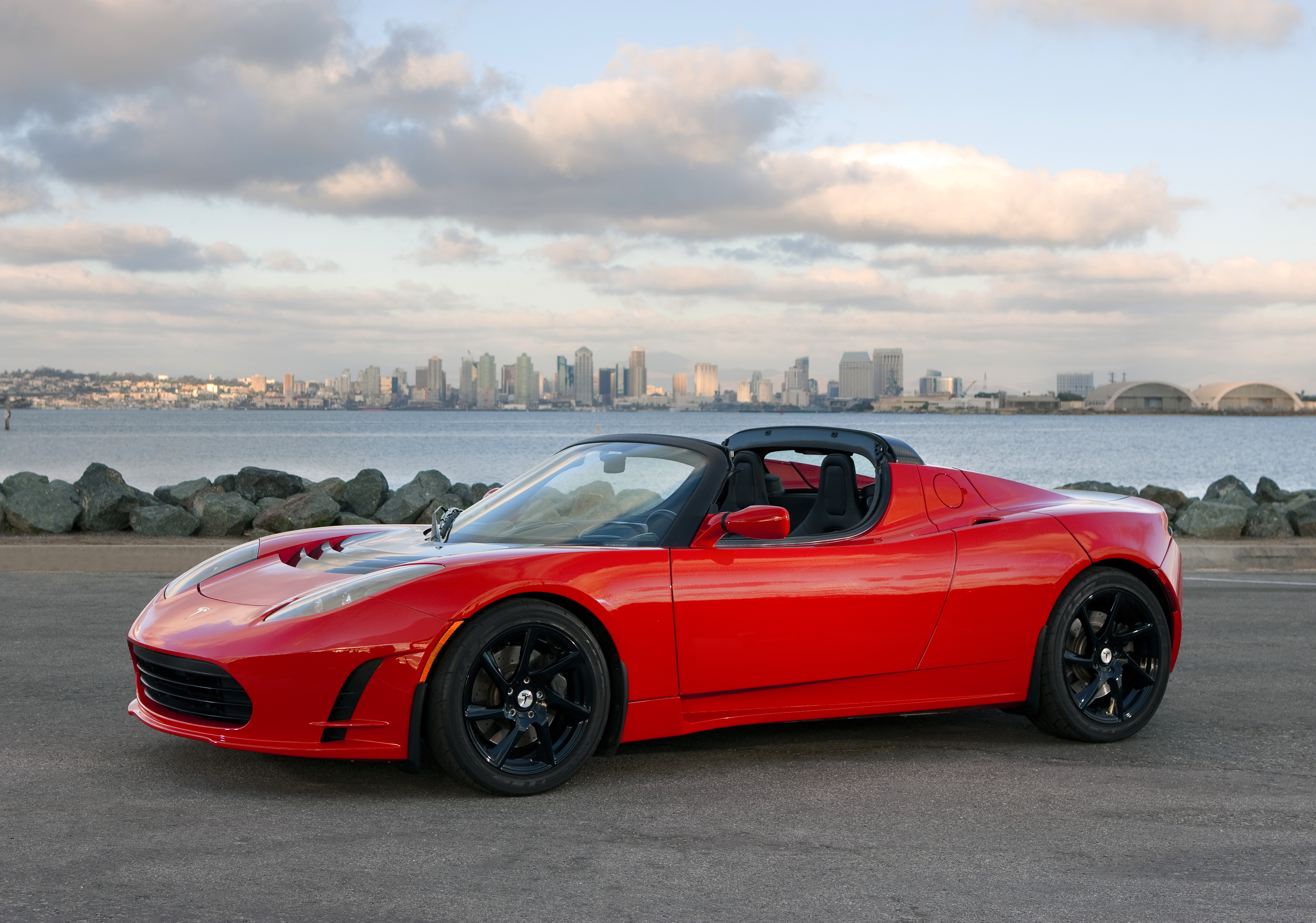
Tesla Roadster

Examples of work undertaken by Lotus Engineering include:

- Lotus Talbot Sunbeam—Talbot's hot hatch rally car of the early 1980s
- DMC DeLorean. Changes to the original concept led to considerable schedule pressures. The car was deemed to require almost complete re-engineering, which was turned over to engineer Colin Chapman, founder of Lotus. Lotus replaced most of the unproven material and manufacturing techniques with those then employed by Lotus in the Lotus Esprit
- Vauxhall Lotus Carlton (also Opel Lotus Omega, internal name Lotus Type 104) – At the time (early 1990s) this was the fastest saloon car available, with a top speed of over 175 mph (280 km/h)
- The 1991 Dodge Spirit R/T with a version of the 2.2 L K-car engine with a 16-valve DOHC head designed by Lotus with over 220 hp (160 kW)
- Vauxhall VX220 (badged Opel Speedster outside of the UK) – Lotus produced and based the car upon the same aluminium chassis design as the Lotus Elise. Production of these models ended in 2005
- Lotus styled and assisted with the engineering of the Tesla Roadster, an electric sports car based on the Elise, as well as licensing some technologies to Tesla Motors and constructing the Roadster at their plant in Hethel.
- The Aston Martin DB9's chassis was developed with the help of Lotus Engineering
- Lotus was responsible for most of the design, development, and testing, of the LT5 DOHC V8 powerplant for the Chevrolet Corvette C4 ZR-1
- Lotus designed, developed and tested the GM Ecotec engine and its variants
- Lotus was responsible for various aspects of the Sinclair C5 electric tricycle
- Lotus was responsible for the suspension calibration of the Toyota MR2 Mk. I, the Toyota Supra Mk. II and Mk. III, the Isuzu Piazza, the Isuzu Impulse as well as newer Proton models
- Lotus did engineering work on the PROTON Satria GTi model
- Lotus was responsible for the development of the Campro engine together with Proton, as well as its variable valve timing system, the Cam Profile Switching (CPS). Currently available in the 1.6-litre and 1.3-litre variants, the Campro engine now powers most of Proton's newer models
- Lotus has worked on the suspension of the Mahindra Scorpio to make it more stable at high speeds
- Lotus produced the revised chassis of the Isuzu Piazza
- Lotus has worked on the suspension and handling of the Volvo 480
- The Dodge EV concept electric vehicle from Chrysler is based on a Lotus Europa S
- Lotus has worked on the suspension and handling of the Nissan GT-R
- Lotus rebuilt, modified, and tuned a Lada Riva on Top Gear season 1, episode 8
- The 2006 Volkswagen GX3 features a chassis developed by Lotus for VW
- The 2009 Kia Soul features Lotus tuned suspension (UK only)
- 2010: Limo-Green project with Jaguar Cars. Lotus provided the Range Extender engine for a prototype XJ series-hybrid car. The car returned 58 mpg (imperial) running off the range extender alone
- Lotus partnered with Jaguar for developing chassis system and engine management of the Jaguar C-X75. The engine is a supercharged 1.6 turbo petrol engine rated at 507 PS (500 hp; 373 kW) coupled with a 177 PS (175 hp; 130 kW).
- Lotus has worked on handling and steering of the 2015 Hyundai Genesis.
- The 2015 Spyker B6 Venator is powered by a Lotus-built engine originating from a Toyota-sourced block.
- The Baojun 730, a Chinese minivan with Lotus-tuned suspension, built by a General Motors subsidiary.
- HB.T, a track bicycle with a novel aerodynamic design; produced in collaboration with Hope Technology and British Cycling.

=== Lotus based cars ===
- Detroit Electric SP.01, based on Elise chassis
- Hennessey Venom GT, based on the Exige/Elise chassis
- Infiniti Emerg-e concept car, based on Evora 414E
- Melkus RS2000, based on Elise chassis
- Rinspeed sQuba concept car, based on Elise chassis
- Tesla Roadster, based on Elise chassis
- Vauxhall VX220/Opel Speedster, based on the Elise

== Electric vehicles ==
=== Evija ===
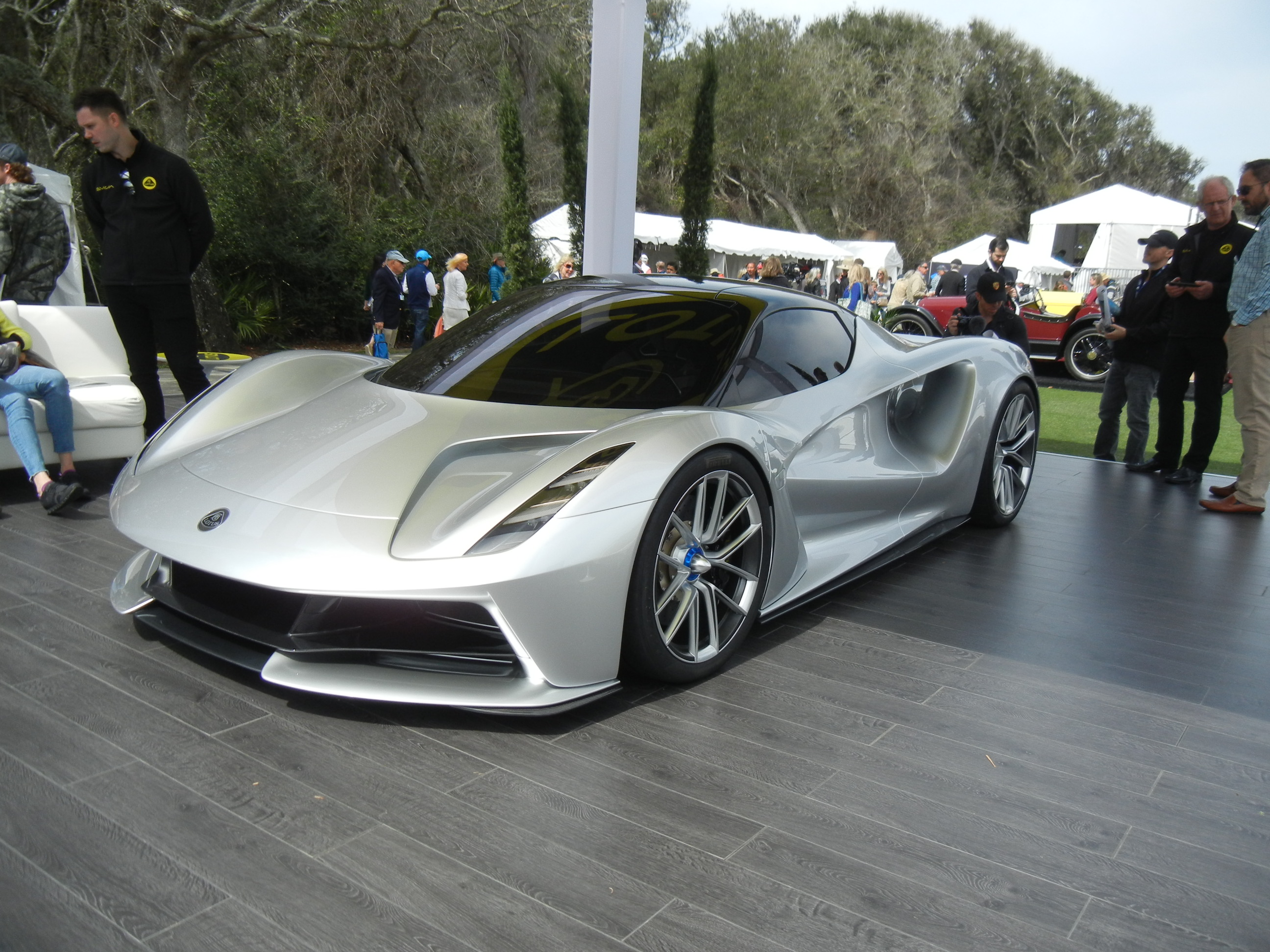
Lotus Evija

Lotus unveiled what they consider to be their first production electric hypercar, called the Evija, in July 2019. Production would be limited to 130 units and is scheduled to begin in summer 2020 and is being delivered to customers in early 2023. The car was undergoing development under the codename Type 130. In 2022 Lotus switched to a 93 kilowatt-hours (330 MJ) battery,(up from 70 kwh) which Unipart's Hyperbat claims to supply. There are 4 electric motors, one placed on each wheel supported by an Integral powertrain. The powertrain is rated at a total output of 2,039 PS (1,500 kW; 2,011 hp) with 1,704 N⋅m (1,257 lb⋅ft) of torque. The Evija has a range of 346 km (215 miles).

=== Other cars ===
The first-generation Tesla Roadster is based on the Elise chassis. On 11 July 2005, Tesla and Lotus entered an agreement about products and services based on the Lotus Elise, where Lotus provided advice on designing and developing a vehicle as well as producing partly assembled vehicles.

Lotus Engineering has established a group dedicated to hybrid and electric vehicles.

Lotus Engineering developed the Evora 414E as their first hybrid concept car. Featuring a total hybrid range of more than 300 miles.

Lotus joined Jaguar Cars, MIRA Ltd and Caparo on a luxury hybrid executive sedan project called "Limo-Green"—funded by the UK Government Technology Strategy Board. The vehicle will be a series plug-in hybrid.

== See also ==
- List of car manufacturers of the United Kingdom
