= Lotus 66 =

Track day car

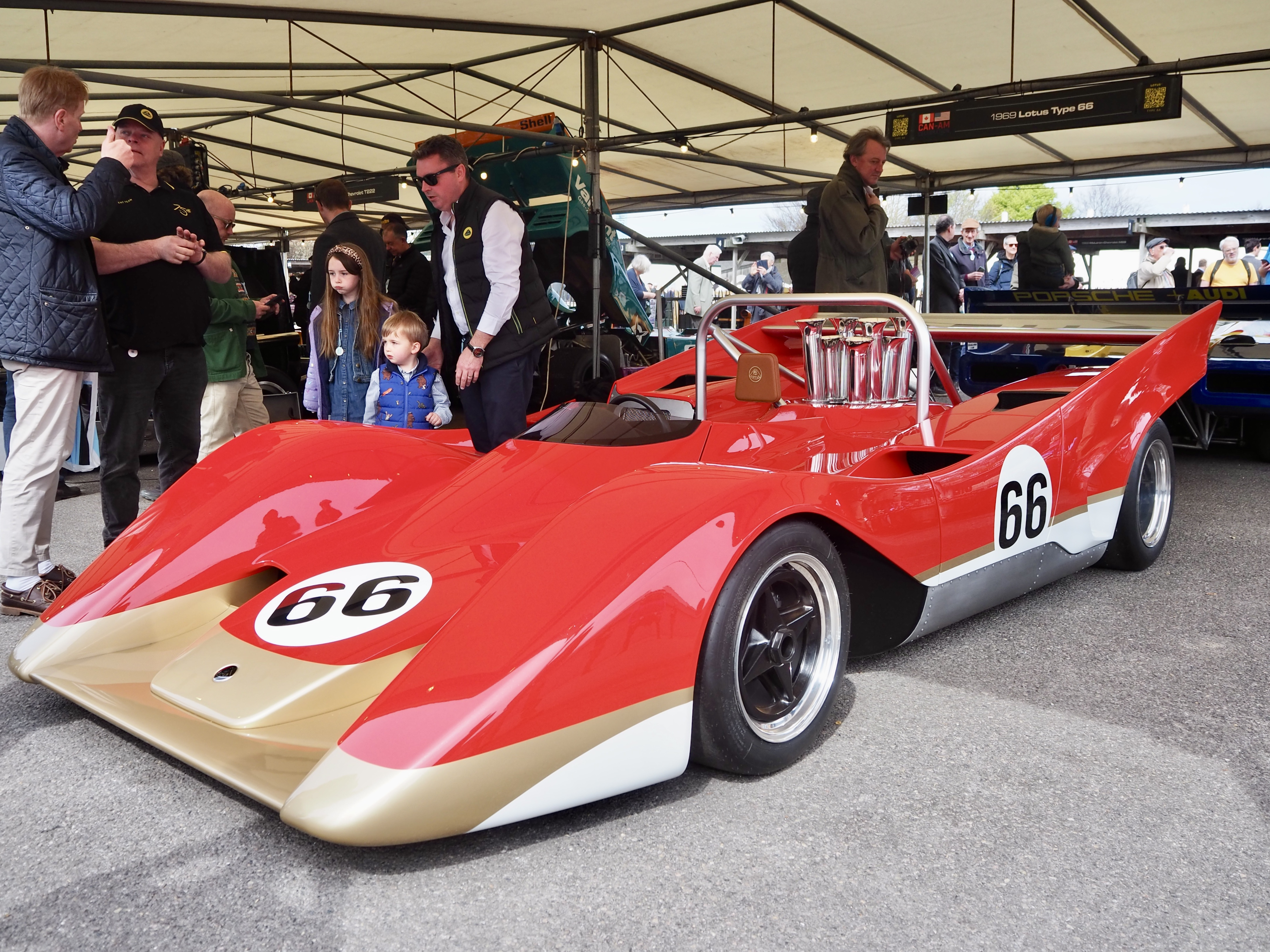
- Lotus 66 at the 81st Goodwood Members' Meeting

Overview
- Manufacturer: Lotus Cars
- Production: 2024
- Assembly: United Kingdom: Hethel, Norfolk, England
- Designer: Geoff Ferris

Body and chassis
- Class: Track day car
- Body style: Roadster
- Layout: Mid engine RWD

Powertrain
- Engine: 7,997 cc (488.0 cu in) Chevrolet V8
- Power output: 830 bhp (620 kW; 840 PS) @ 8800 rpm 750 N⋅m (550 lb⋅ft)
- Transmission: 5-speed paddle-operated semi-automatic sequential

Dimensions
- Wheelbase: 2,438 mm (96.0 in)
- Height: 1,100 mm (43 in)
- Kerb weight: 800 kg (1,764 lb)

Chronology
- Predecessor: Lotus 40

The Lotus 66 is a track day car produced by Lotus Cars. The car is based on three drawings for a Can-Am racing car drawn up by Geoff Ferris of Team Lotus in 1969 but which the company did not build. The model number 66 was never allocated in period but chronologically fits in with the Lotus model numbers.

Lotus produced the model after an article in Motor Sport magazine piqued interest, with the intent of it being a celebration of the 75th anniversary of the company. The planned production run is for 10 cars, each costing over £1m.
