= Lotus Theory 1 =

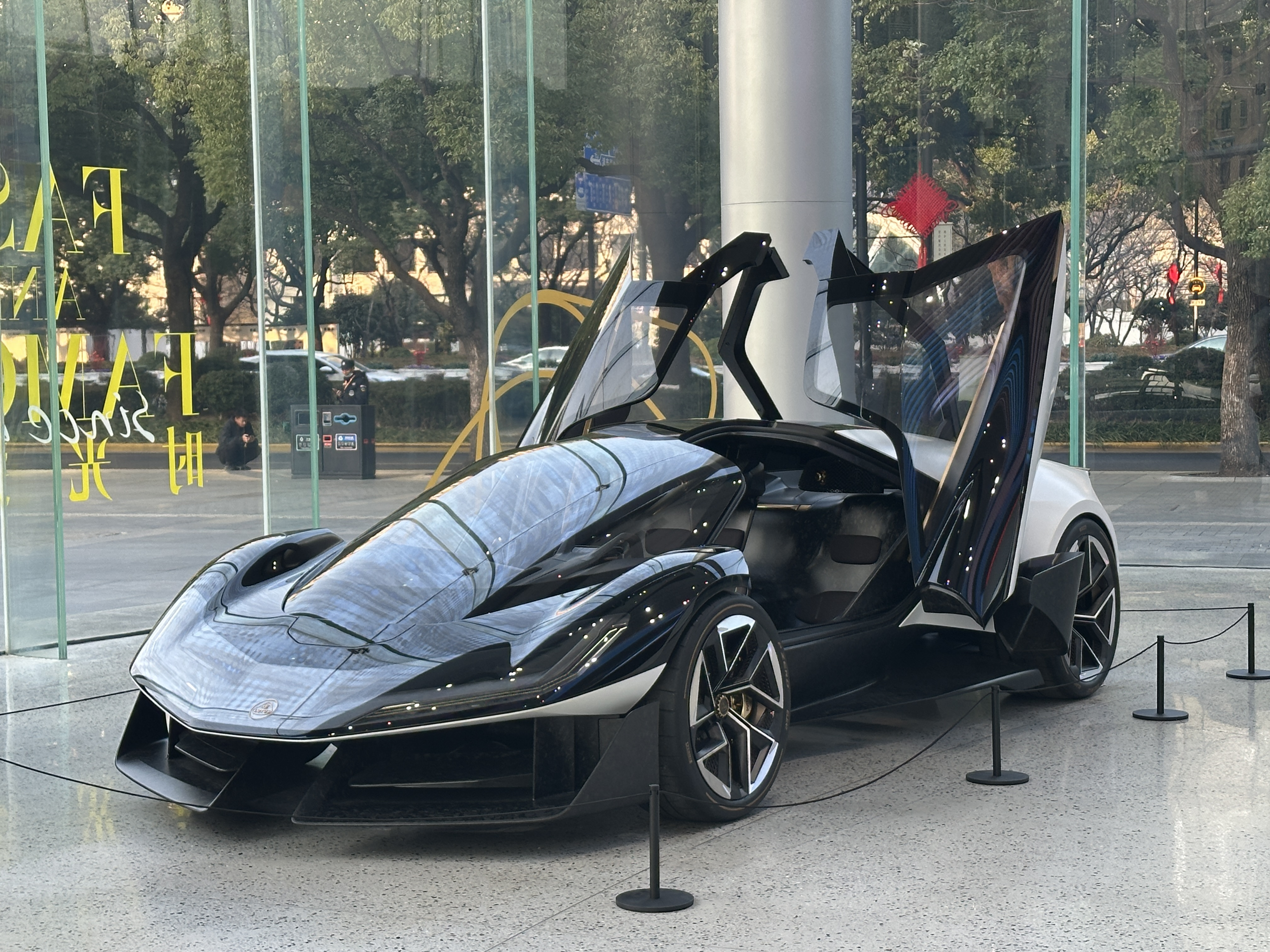

Overview
- Manufacturer: Lotus Cars
- Also called: Type 135
- Production: 2028
- Designer: Ben Payne

Body and chassis
- Class: Sports car
- Layout: V8 Hybrid vehicle

Powertrain
- Engine: Horse Powertrain V8
- Electric motor: permanent magnet synchronous motor

Dimensions
- Wheelbase: 2,650 mm (104.3 in)
- Length: 4,490 mm (176.8 in)
- Width: 2,000 mm (78.7 in)
- Height: 1,140 mm (44.9 in)
- Curb weight: 1,600 kg (3,527 lb)

Chronology
- Predecessor: Lotus Esprit

The Lotus Theory 1 is a electric sports car concept which was revealed on 16 September 2024. A production version is planned for release before 2027.

== Overview ==
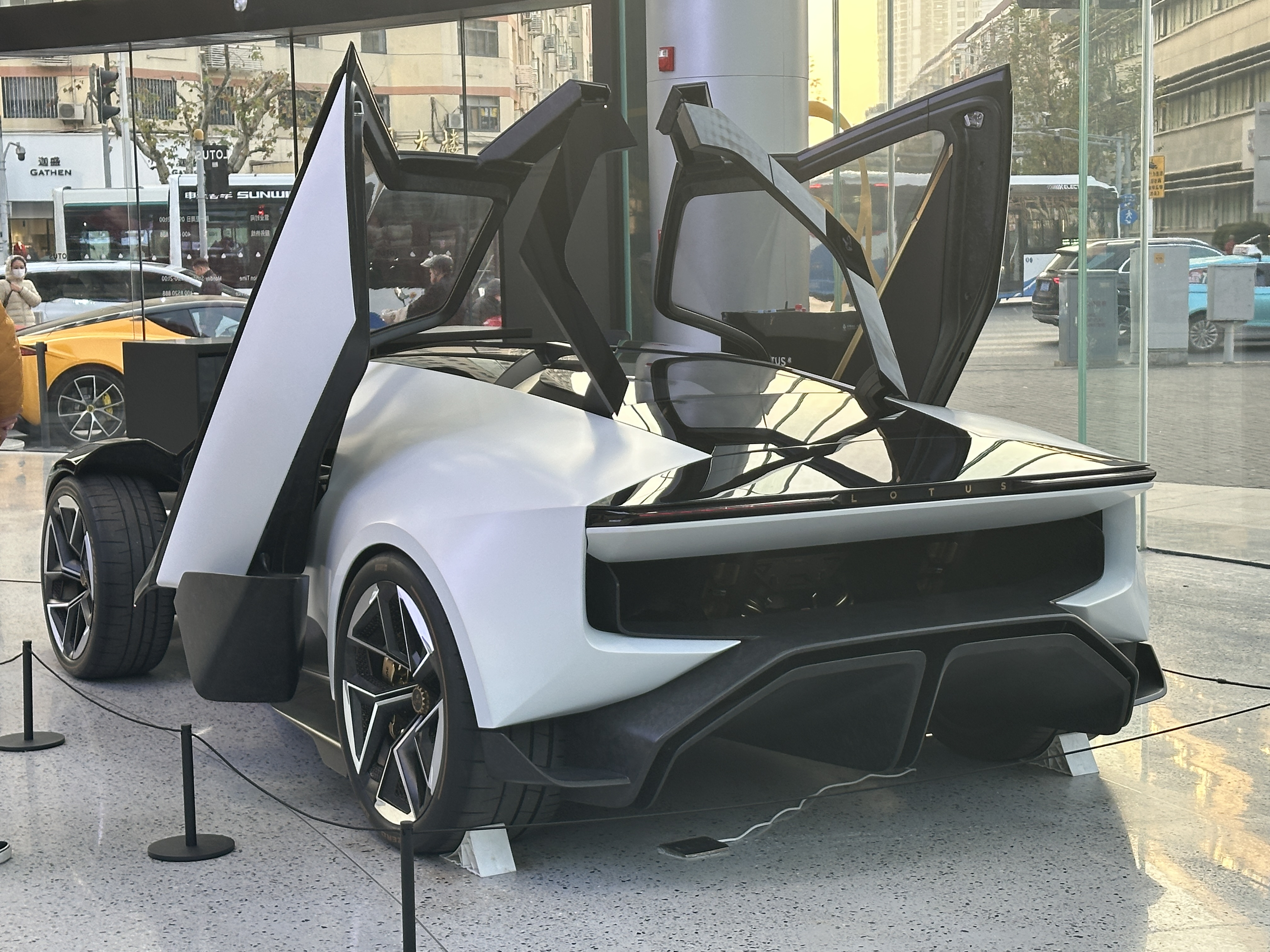
Rear view

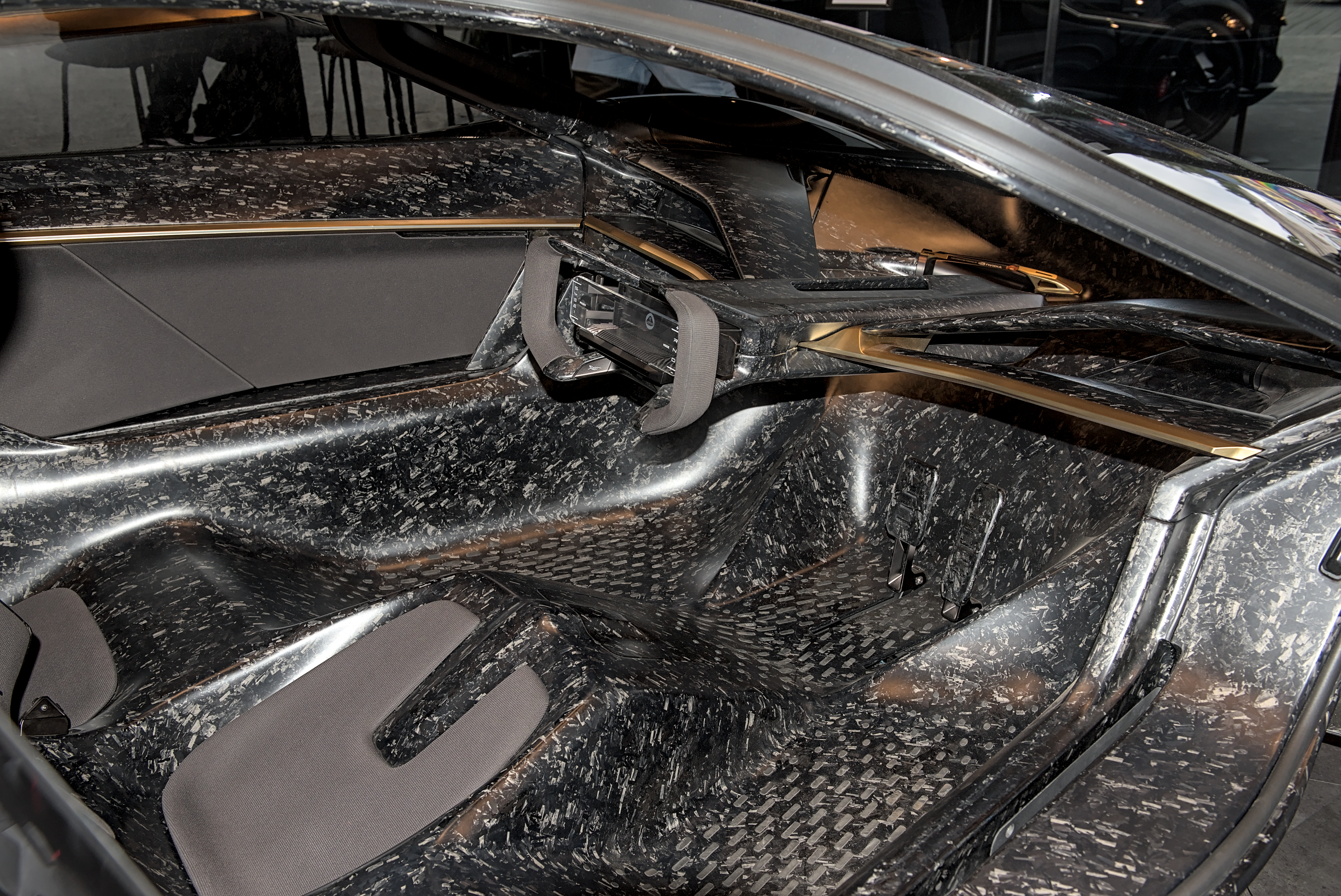
Interior

The Lotus Theory 1 is an all-electric concept which Lotus claims is expected to deliver a total of 986 horsepower (735 kW). Performance figures include a claimed 0-97 km/h (0-60 mph) acceleration time of less than 2.5 seconds and an electronically limited top speed of 319 km/h (198 mph). The concept vehicle achieves a WLTP-rated range of 402 kilometers (250 miles) from its 70.0 kWh battery pack.

The Lotus will streamline the car’s design by using only ten materials, far fewer than the typical 100 found in standard cars. Along with the integrated battery, Lotus Theory 1 uses a recycled carbon tub and a body made of composite and polycarbonate. A target weight of under 3,527 pounds really sets it apart.

Taking cues from the McLaren F1, Lotus Theory 1 concept places the driver in a central cockpit position, flanked by two passenger seats. The automaker has also introduced a system called "Lotuswear". It incorporates haptic airbags and vibrant lighting throughout the interior to interact with both the driver and passengers. The steering wheel can vibrate on either side to signal the driver when to make a turn.

== Production ==
On 11 May 2026, Lotus Cars announced its "Focus 2030" business strategy, which confirmed that the Type 135 — the production model previewed by the Lotus Theory 1 concept — would reach the market in 2028 as an all-new hybrid V8 supercar rather than the all-electric vehicle originally envisaged.
