= Lotus Mark I =

Car produced by Lotus Cars in 1948

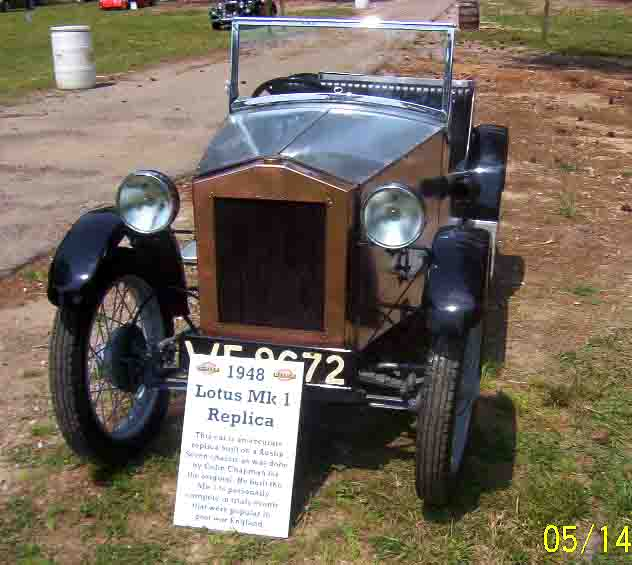
Replica of Lotus Mark I

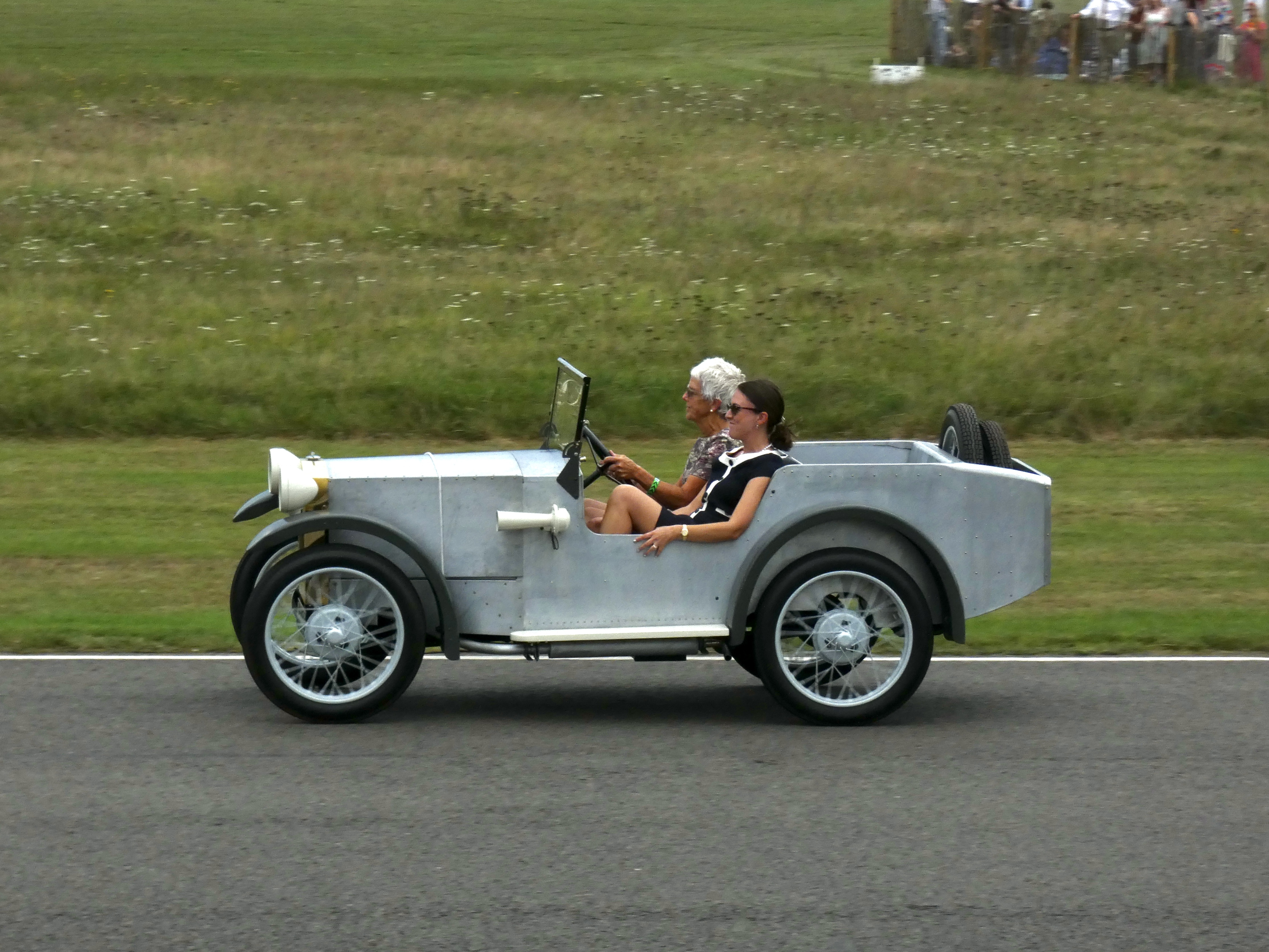
Side view, Goodwood Revival Meeting 2023

The Lotus Mark I was the first car designed and built by Colin Chapman in 1948, while Chapman was still a student at the University of London. The car was designed to compete as a trials car, and was constructed on an Austin 7 chassis and running gear and given registration number OX 9292. Chapman built the body utilizing a composite made of thin aluminium bonded to plywood. He modified the rear suspension to give better handling and the engine to give more power. His approach to automobile construction using sound engineering principles and ingenious chassis design set the stage for many more revolutionary designs to follow. Although the original Mark I has been lost to history after being bought by a mysterious buyer in 1950, a replica (see photo) was created to the same dimensions that uses an identical Austin chassis and running gear. Chapman and his future wife competed with the car in English Trials, a form of competition over rough terrain against time. Chapman continued to develop and modify the Mark I. First larger wheels and tyres were fitted and the front beam axle was split and hinged in the centre to provide independent front suspension. The success of the car helped encourage Chapman to continue designing competition cars.
