= Lotus 55 =

The Lotus 55 was an open-wheel Formula 3 racing car used as a one-off by British motorsport team Lotus in 1968.

The Lotus 55 was based on the Lotus 41X, built as a one-off in 1967. The car had an extreme wedge shape and was driven by John Miles in 1968.

Miles achieved a number of victories in the British Formula 3 Championship and in the FIA Formula 3 European Nations Cup with the agile car.

The car was painted in the colors of the sponsor Gold Leaf, analogous to the Lotus Formula One cars of the time.
