= Space frame =

Rigid three-dimensional load-bearing truss structure

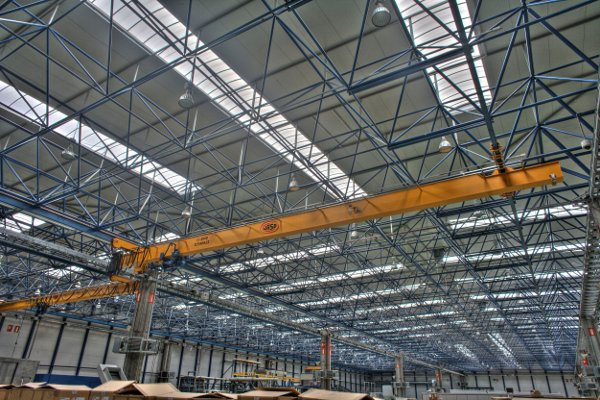
The roof of this industrial building is supported by a space frame structure.

If a force is applied to the blue node and the red bar were not present, the resultant effect on the structure would depend entirely on the blue node's bending rigidity, i.e. to its resistance (or lack thereof) to bending; however, with the red bar in place, then assuming negligible bending rigidity of the blue node as compared with the red bar's contributing rigidity, this 3-dimensional load-bearing truss structure could be solved using a rigidity matrix (neglecting angular factors).

A space frame or space structure (3D truss) is a rigid, lightweight, truss-like structure constructed from interlocking struts in a geometric pattern. Space frames can be used in architecture and structural engineering to span large areas with few interior supports. Like the truss, a space frame is strong because of the inherent rigidity of the triangle; flexing loads (bending moments) are transmitted as tension and compression loads along the length of each strut.

Chief applications include buildings and vehicles.

== History ==
From 1898 to 1908, Alexander Graham Bell developed space frames based on tetrahedral geometry, primarily for nautical and aeronautical engineering. He invented the tetrahedral truss.

Max Mengeringhausen developed the space grid system called MERO (acronym of Mengeringhausen Rohrbauweise) in 1943 in Germany, the first use of space trusses in architecture. The commonly used method, still in use, has individual tubular members connected at node joints (ball shaped) and variations such as the space deck system, octet truss system, and cubic system.

Stéphane de Chateau in France invented the tridirectional SDC system (1957), Unibat system (1959), and Pyramitec (1960). A method of tree supports was developed to replace the individual columns.

Buckminster Fuller patented the octet truss (U.S. patent 2,986,241) in 1961 while focusing on architectural structures.

Gilman's tetrahedral truss of 1980 was developed by John J. Gilman, a material scientist known for his work on the molecular matrices of crystalline solids. Gilman was an admirer of Buckminster Fuller's architectural trusses, and developed a stronger matrix, in part by rotating an alignment of tetrahedral nodes in relation to each other.

== Design methods ==
Space frames are typically designed using a rigidity matrix. The special characteristic of the stiffness matrix in an architectural space frame is the independence of the angular factors. If the joints are sufficiently rigid, then the angular deflections can be neglected, simplifying the calculations.

== Overview ==
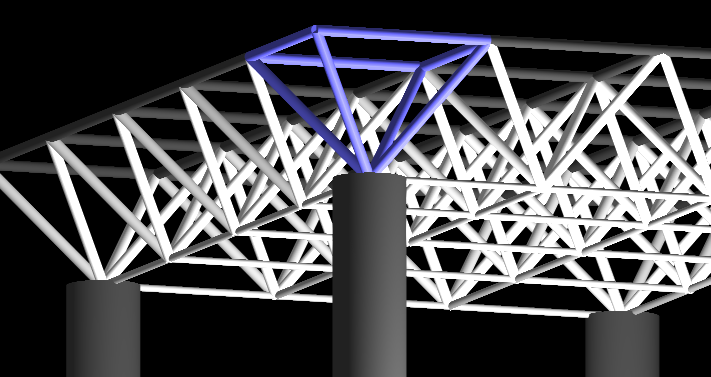
Simplified space frame roof with the half-octahedron highlighted in blue

The simplest form of space frame is a horizontal slab of interlocking square pyramids and tetrahedra built from aluminium or tubular steel struts. A stronger form is composed of interlocking tetrahedra in which all the struts have unit length, referred to as an isotropic vector matrix or, in a single unit width, an octet truss. More complex variations change the lengths of the struts to curve the overall structure or may incorporate other geometrical shapes.

== Types ==
Space frames can be classified in various ways.

Curvature classification

- Space plane covers: These spatial structures are composed of planar substructures. Their behavior is similar to that of a plate in which the deflections in the plane are channeled through the horizontal bars and the shear forces are supported by the diagonals.

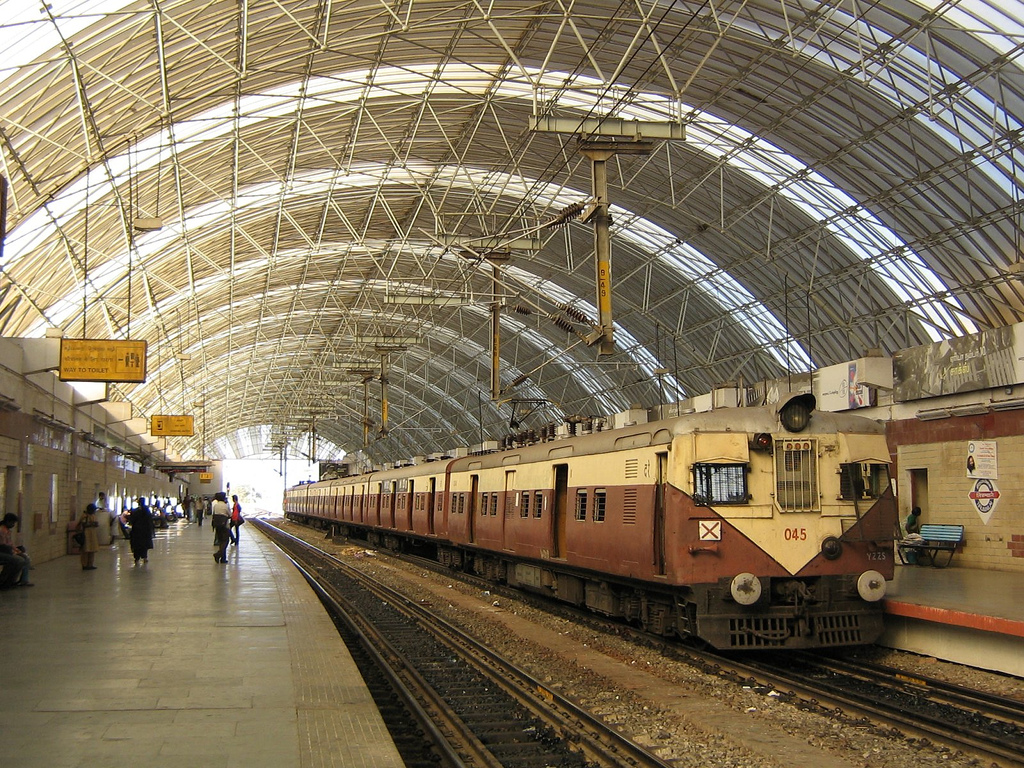
This train station in India is supported by a barrel vault structure

- Barrel vaults: This type of vault has a cross section of a simple arch. Usually this type of space frame does not need to use tetrahedral modules or pyramids as a part of its backing.
- Spherical domes and other compound curves usually require the use of tetrahedral modules or pyramids and additional support from a skin.

Classification by the arrangement of its elements

- Single-layer grid: All elements are located on the surface to be approximated.
- Double-layer grid: Elements are organized in two layers parallel to each other at a certain distance apart. Each of the layers forms a lattice of triangles, squares, or hexagons in which the projection of the nodes in a layer may overlap or be displaced relative to each other. Diagonal bars connect the nodes of both layers in different directions in space. In this type of meshe, the elements are associated into three groups: upper cordon, cordon, and cordon lower diagonal.
- Triple-layer grid: Elements are placed in three parallel layers, linked by the diagonals. They are almost always flat.

Other examples classifiable as space frames include:

- Pleated metallic structures: Emerged to try to solve the problems that formwork and pouring concrete had their counterparts. Typically run with welded joint, but may raise prefabricated joints, a fact which makes them space meshes.
- Hanging covers: Designs on the cable taut, spine, and the catenary arch (inverted funicular) show their ability to channel forces theoretically better than any alternative, and they have an infinite range of possibilities for composition and adaptability to any type of plant cover. However, imprecisions in shape risk having the loaded strand bend to unexpected stresses; mitigation of this problem requires pre-compression and pre-stressing elements. In most cases, they tend to be the cheapest solution that best fits the acoustics and ventilation of the covered enclosure. They are vulnerable to vibration.
- Pneumatic structures: Closure membranes subjected to a pressurized state may be considered within this group.

== Applications ==
Buildings

- Industrial structures:
  - Factories
  - Warehouses,
- Commercial, entertainment, and service facilities:
  - Sports halls
  - Conference halls, pavilions, and exhibition centers
  - Stadiums
  - Museums and fair houses
  - Shopping malls
  - Airports

Vehicles:

- Aircraft
- Automobiles
- Motorcycles
- Bicycles
- Spacecraft

Architectural design elements

- Atriums
- Geodesics

=== Construction ===
Space frames are a common feature in modern building construction; they are often found in large roof spans in modernist commercial and industrial buildings.

Examples of buildings based on space frames include:

- Stansted Airport, by Foster + Partners
- Bank of China Tower and the Louvre Pyramid, by I. M. Pei
- Rogers Centre by Rod Robbie and Michael Allan
- McCormick Place East in Chicago
- Arena das Dunas in Natal, Brazil by Populous
- Eden Project in Cornwall, England
- Globen, Sweden - Dome with diameter of 110 m, (1989)
- Biosphere 2 by John P. Allen, Phil Hawes, Peter Jon Pearce in Oracle, Arizona
- Jacob K. Javits Convention Center, New York City, New York
- Palau Sant Jordi in Barcelona, Spain by Arata Isozaki
- Sochi International Airport in Sochi, Russia
- Entrance to Six Flags Magic Mountain
- Taiwan Taoyuan International Airport airport terminal 2
- Harbin Opera House in China by Ma Yansong
- Hedyar Aliyev Centre in Azerbaijan by Zaha Hadid

Large portable stages and lighting gantries are also frequently built from space frames and octet trusses.

=== Vehicles ===
==== Aircraft ====
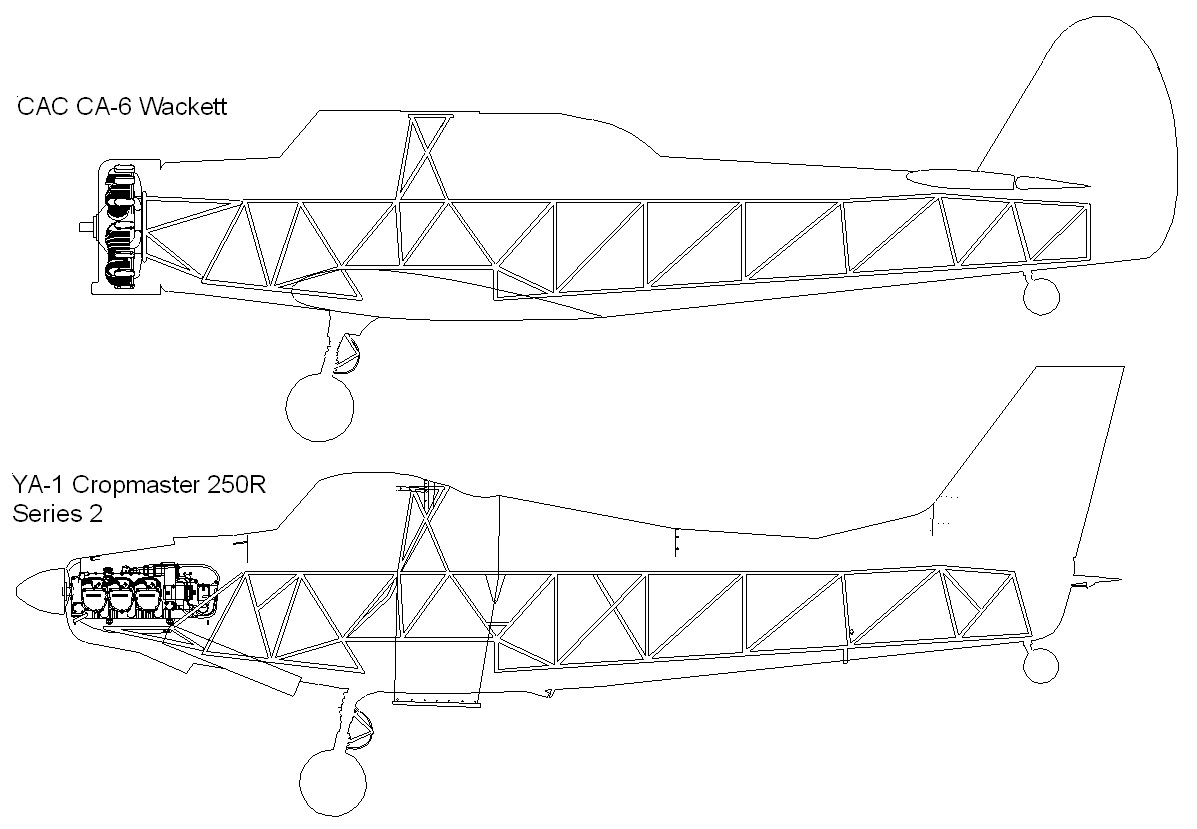
Yeoman YA-1 vsCAC CA-6 Wackett frames

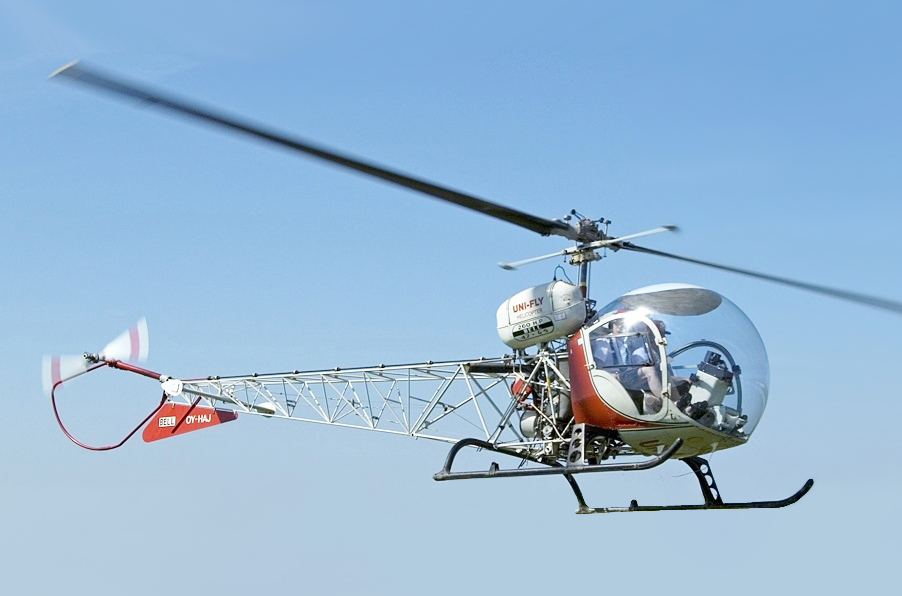
Bell 47G

The CAC CA-6 Wackett and Yeoman YA-1 Cropmaster 250R aircraft were built using roughly the same welded steel-tube fuselage frame.

Many early "whirlybird"-style exposed-boom helicopters had tubular space-frame booms, such as the Bell 47 series.

==== Cars ====
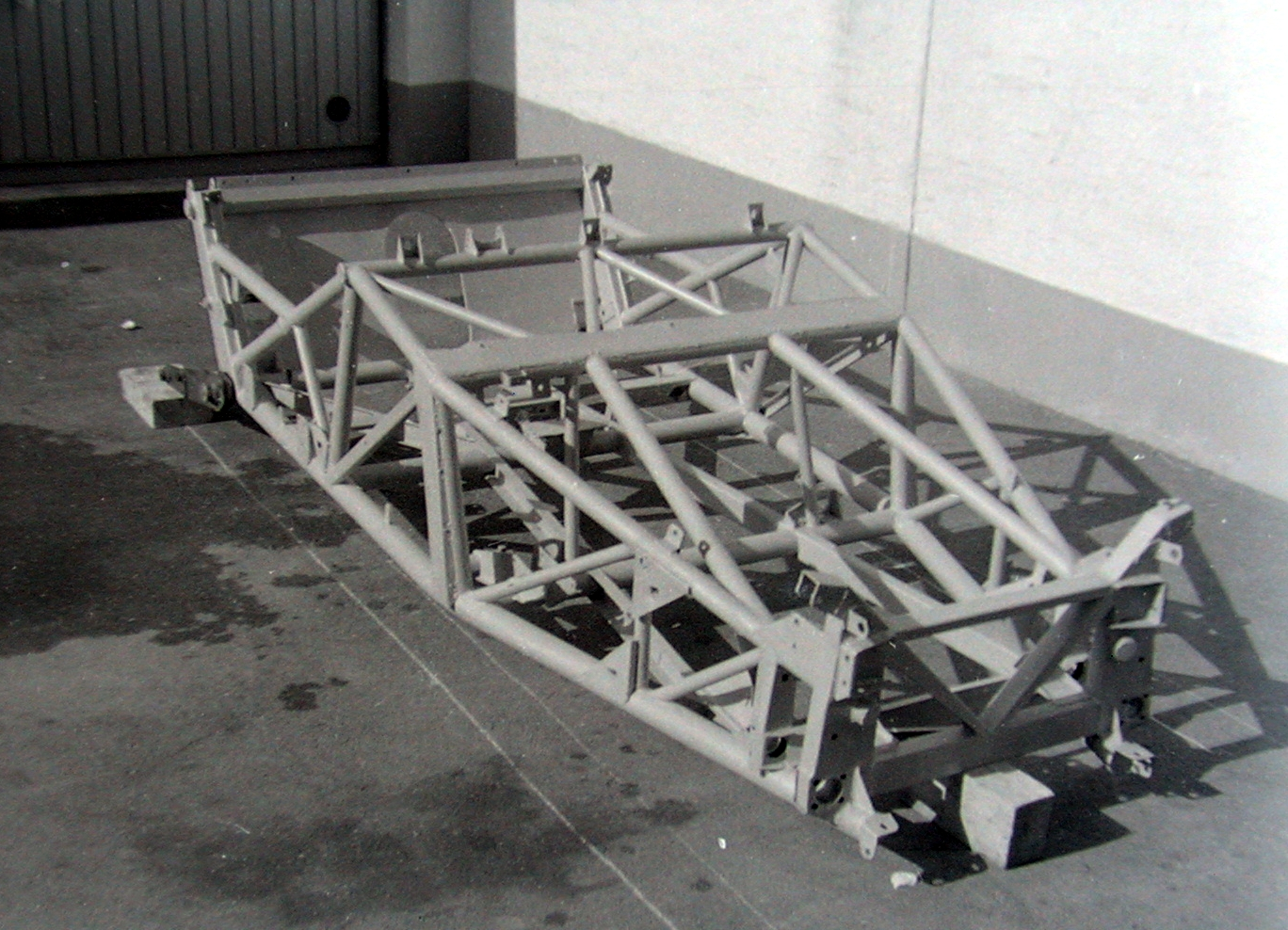
Jaguar C-Type automobile racer tubular space frame (1951-1953)

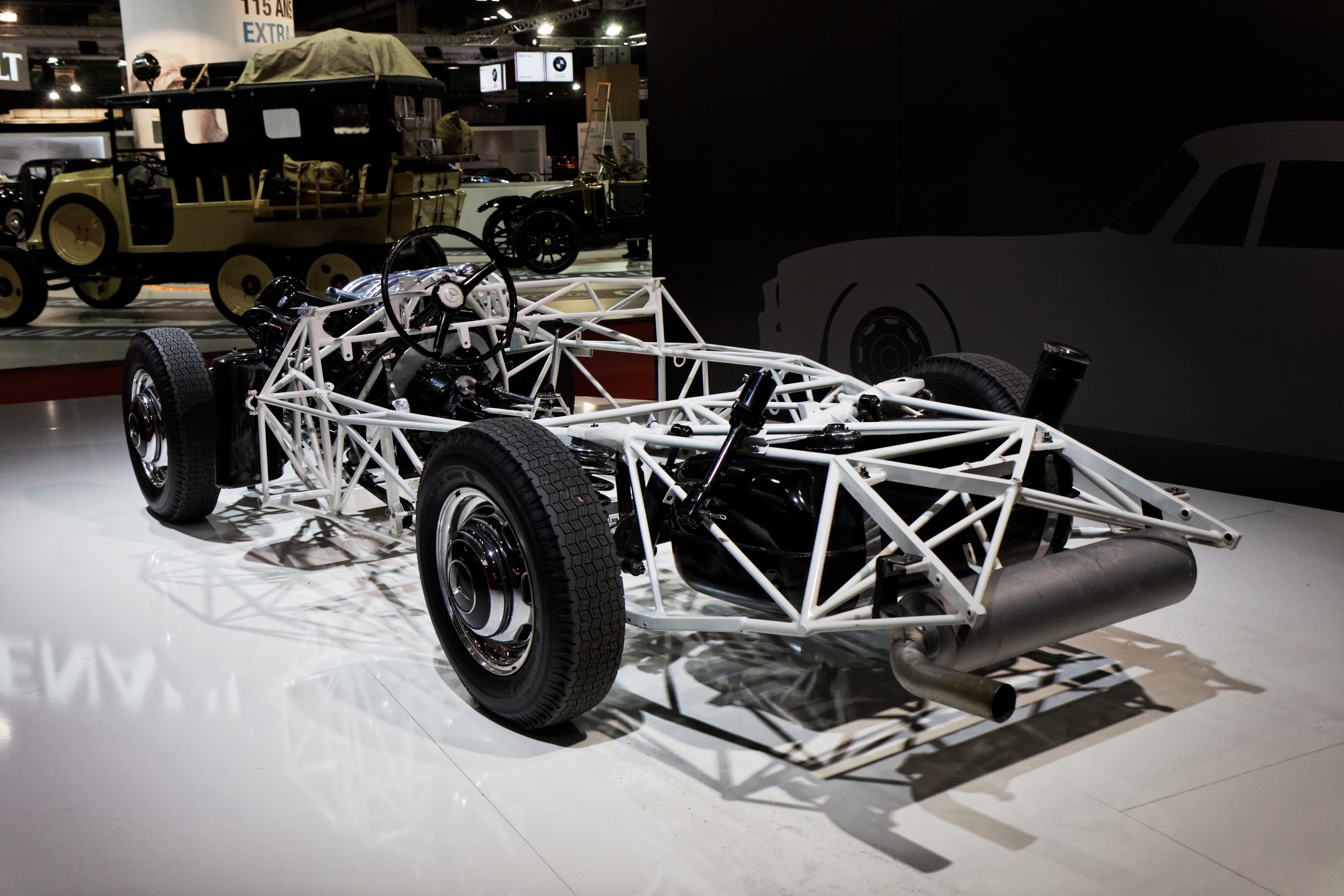
Mercedes-Benz 300 SL sport car's tubular frame (1954-1957)

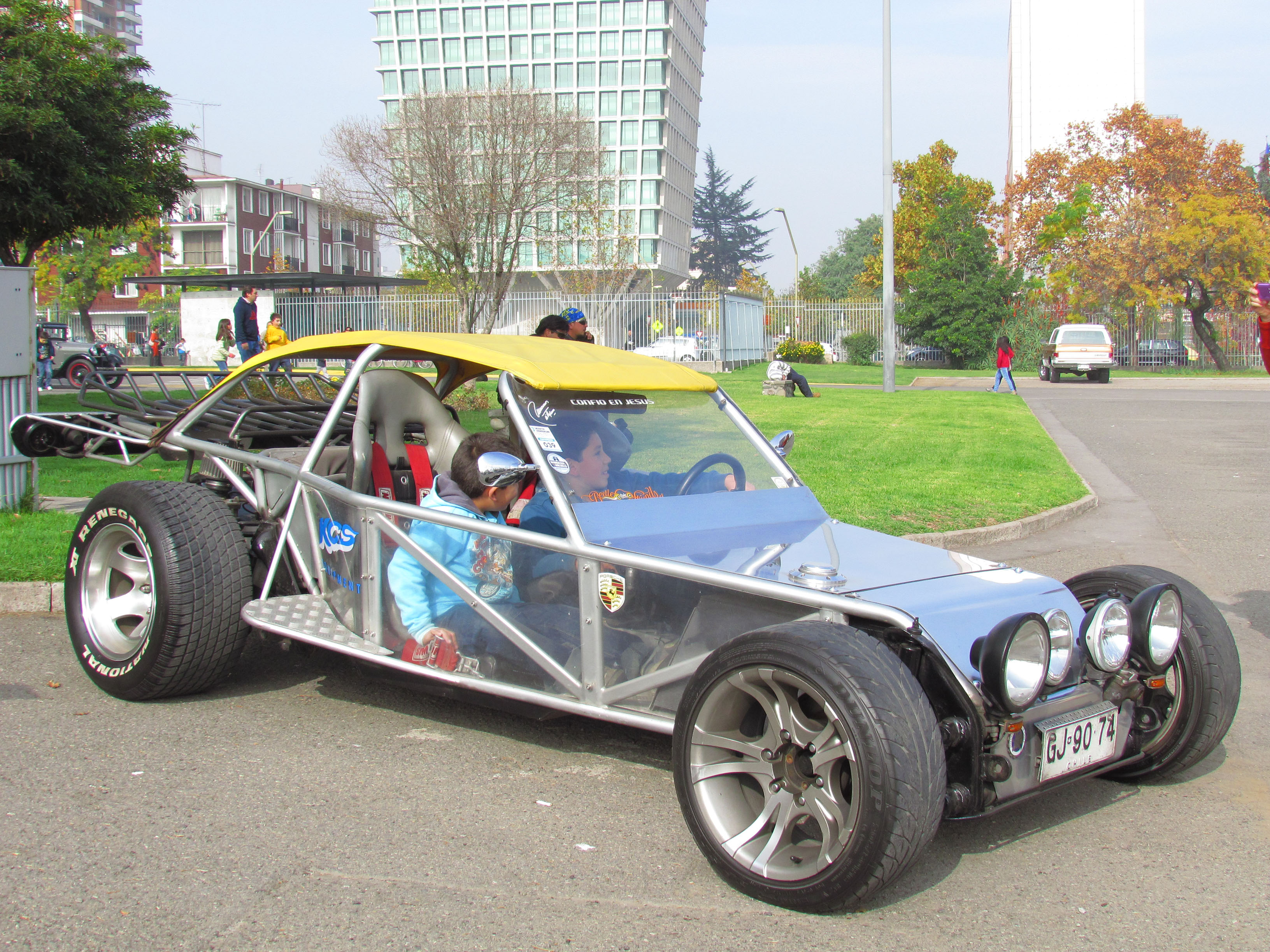
Chilean kit car showing off its space frame structure (2013)

Space frames are sometimes used in the chassis designs of automobiles and motorcycles. In both a space-frame and a tube-frame chassis, the suspension, engine, and body panels are attached to a skeletal frame of tubes, and the body panels have little or no structural function. By contrast, in a unibody or monocoque design, the body serves as part of the structure.

Tube-frame chassis pre-date space frame chassis and are a development of the earlier ladder chassis. The advantage of using tubes rather than the previous open-channel sections is that they resist torsional forces better. Some tube chassis were little more than a ladder chassis made with two large-diameter tubes, or even a single tube as a backbone chassis. Although many tubular chassis developed additional tubes and were even described as "space frames", their design was rarely correctly stressed as a space frame, and they behaved mechanically as a tube-ladder chassis, with additional brackets to support the attached components. The distinction of the true space frame is that all the forces in each strut are either tensile or compressive, never bending. Although these additional tubes did carry some extra load, they were rarely diagonalised into a rigid space frame.

An earlier contender for the first true space-frame chassis is the one-off Chamberlain 8 race "special" built by brothers Bob and Bill Chamberlain in Melbourne, Australia, in 1929. Others attribute vehicles were produced in the 1930s by designers such as Buckminster Fuller and William Bushnell Stout (the Dymaxion and the Stout Scarab) who understood the theory of the true space frame from either architecture or aircraft design.

A post-WW2 attempt to build a racing car space frame was the Cisitalia D46 of 1946. This used two small-diameter tubes along each side, but they were spaced apart by vertical smaller tubes, and so were not diagonalised in any plane. A year later, Porsche designed their Type 360 for Cisitalia. As this included diagonal tubes, it can be considered a true space frame and arguably the first mid-rear engined design.

In 1949, Robert Eberan von Eberhorst designed the Jowett Jupiter exhibited at that year's London Motor Show; the Jowett went on to take a class win at the 1950 Le Mans 24hr. Later, TVR, the small British car manufacturers, developed the concept and produced an alloy-bodied two-seater on a multi-tubular chassis, which appeared in 1949.

The space frame Jaguar C-Type racing car was introduced in 1951 and produced through 1953. In 1954 Mercedes-Benz introduced the space frame 300 SL "Gullwing" sports car, the fastest production car of its day.

A large number of kit cars use space frame construction, because manufacturing them in small quantity requires only simple and inexpensive jigs, and it is relatively easy for an amateur designer to achieve good stiffness with a space frame.

A drawback of the space-frame chassis is that it encloses much of the working volume of the car and can make access for both the driver and to the engine difficult. The Mercedes-Benz 300 SL "Gullwing" received its iconic upward-opening doors when its tubular space frame made using regular doors impossible.

Some space frames have been designed with removable sections, joined by bolted pin joints. Such a structure had already been used around the engine of the Lotus Mark III. Although somewhat inconvenient, an advantage of the space frame is that the same lack of bending forces in the tubes that allow it to be modeled as a pin-jointed structure also means that creating such a removable section need not reduce the strength of the assembled frame.

==== Motorcycles and bicycles ====
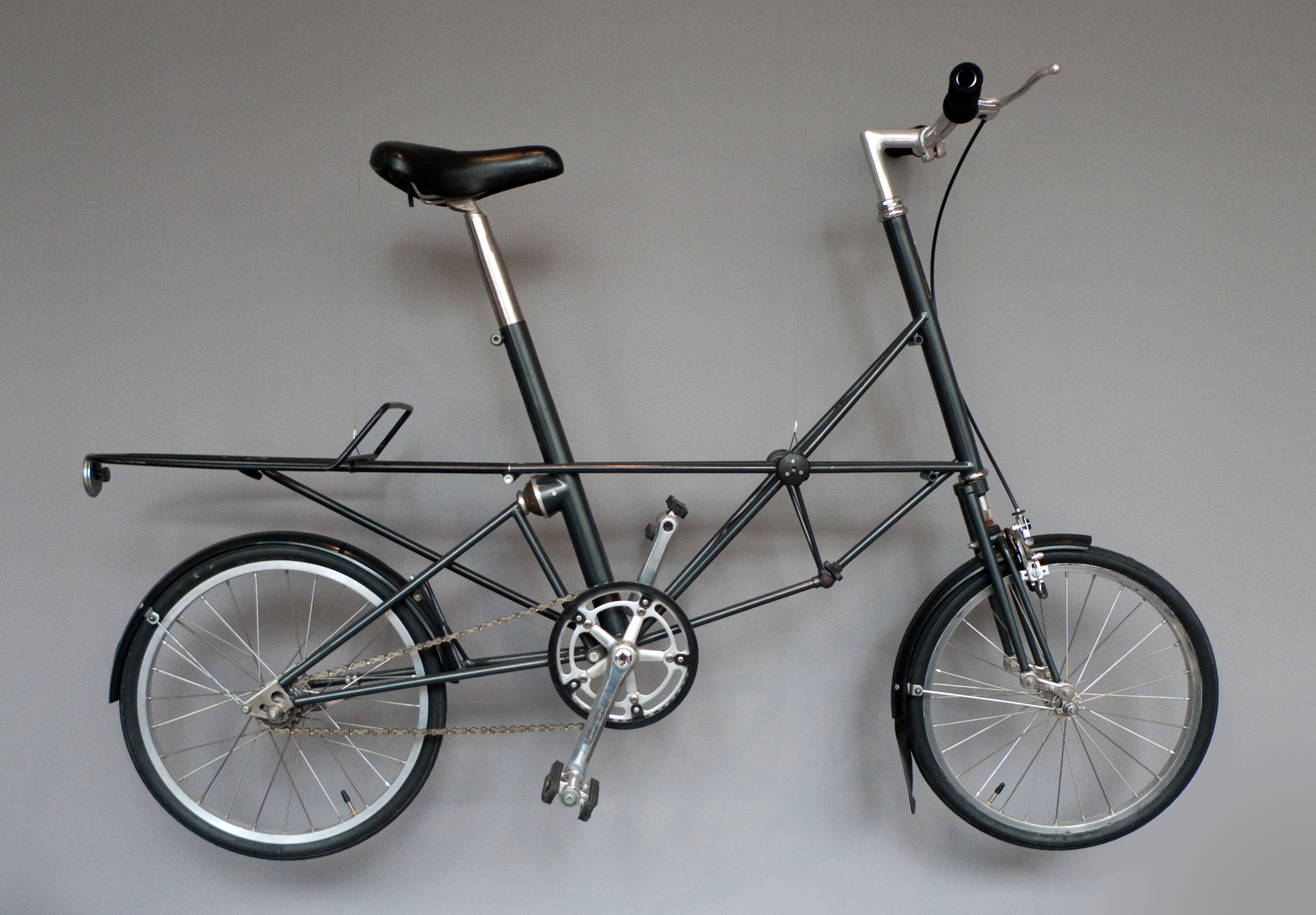
Moulton bicycle at the Museum of Modern Art

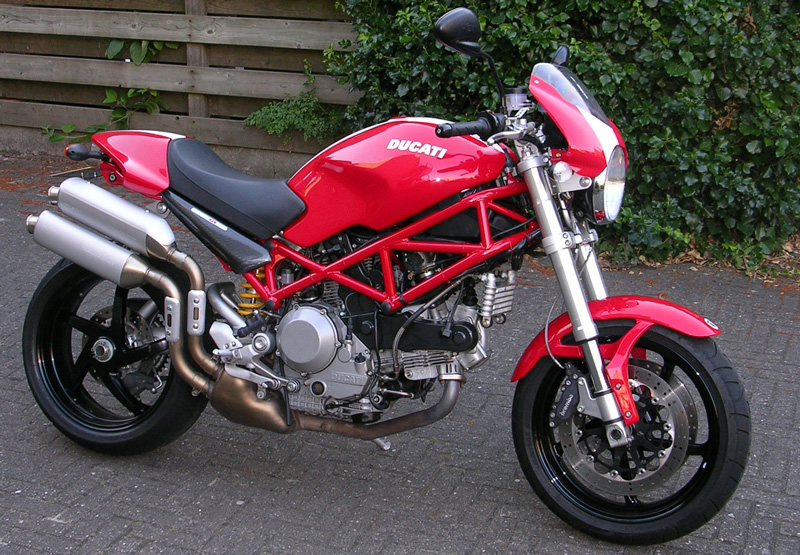
2006 Ducati Monster S2R 1000

Tubular frames - often using the engine as a stressed member of the chassis - are commonplace in motorcycles, having been introduced in the 1970s in such bikes as the Honda CBX, which debuted in 1978. Italian motorbike manufacturer Ducati extensively uses them.

Space frames have also been used in bicycles, which readily favor stressed triangular sectioning.

== See also ==
- Backbone chassis
- Body-on-frame
- Exoskeleton car
- Framing (construction)
- Monocoque
- Modular construction system
- Platonic solid
- Simplex
- Stressed skin
- Superleggera
- Tensegrity
- Tessellated roof
- Tetrahedral-octahedral honeycomb
