= KS-3 (disambiguation) =

KS3 or KS-3 may refer to:

- Kansas's 3rd congressional district, United States House of Representatives
- K-3 (Kansas highway), an American road
- Key Stage 3, of British secondary education
- KS-3 Cropmaster, an Australian agricultural aircraft
