= Lotus Mark IV =

Overview
- Manufacturer: Lotus Cars
- Production: 1952 (1 unit made)
- Designer: Colin Chapman

Body and chassis
- Class: Sports car
- Body style: Roadster
- Related: Austin 7

Powertrain
- Engine: Ford side valve 1172cc

Chronology
- Predecessor: Lotus Mark III
- Successor: Lotus Mark V

Lotus Mark IV was a trials car by Colin Chapman built on an Austin 7 chassis. Chapman's success at building trials cars brought another previous customer, Mike Lawson, to order a second trials car in 1952 to replace his Lotus Mark II, in which he won the Wrotham Cup. Once again Chapman chose an Austin Seven as the starting point, reinforcing the frame and installing a four-cylinder 1,172 cc (71.5 cu in), Ford, sidevalve engine. Chapman used all the tricks he had learned in his previous cars, constructing a lightweight aluminium body with a rounded nosecone. He fitted a 3-speed transmission taken from a Ford 8 and the divided front axle as on his previous cars.

Lawson won his class in the first attempt in this car, following up with others, solidifying Chapman's reputation as a designer and engineer. The success of this car, and other requests for more cars, led Chapman and Michael Allen to establish Lotus Engineering in a disused stable in Hornsey.

Ford Sidevalve Motor
Configuration: S4 SV
Displacement: 1172 cc
Bore/Stroke: 63.5mm x 92.456mm (2.5x3.64")
