= Lotus Mark VI =

British classic roadster

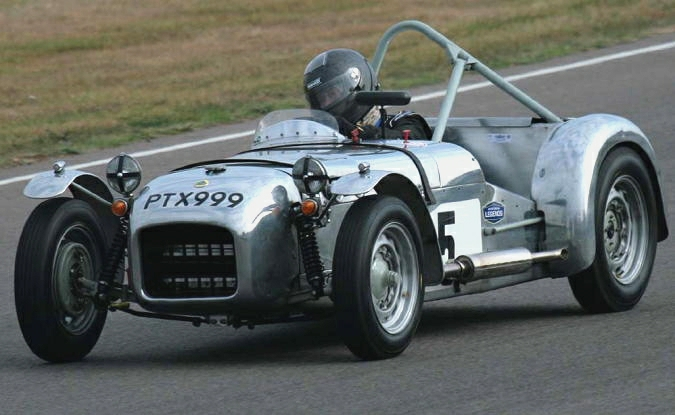

Overview
- Manufacturer: Lotus Cars
- Production: 1952–1957
- Designer: Colin Chapman

Body and chassis
- Class: Sports car
- Body style: Roadster
- Related: Ford Prefect

Powertrain
- Engine: Ford side-valve 1172 cc
- Transmission: 3-speed manual

Chronology
- Predecessor: Lotus Mark V
- Successor: Lotus Seven

The Lotus Mark VI is the first production car by Lotus Cars. Colin Chapman introduced it in 1952, after building multiple trials and road racing cars. The Mark VI features a semi-space frame chassis. Rather than a complete car, it was available to the general public as a kit, wherein the customer could install any preferred engine and gearbox, making it eligible for a wider number of formulae.

== Design ==
The Mark VI reflected Chapman's engineering background: his designs resulted from a stress analysis of loads into the frame; they were extremely light (the 6' space frame weighed only 55 lbs (25 kg)), and the suspension incorporated the latest advances. The Progress Chassis Company built the prototype chassis, and panel beaters Williams and Prichard constructed the aluminium body. (Both firms would later furnish bodies and chassis for subsequent models.) The cheap, readily available mechanical parts came from the Ford Prefect. The Mark VI became a common sight on Britain's racetracks and was a frequent winner, beating many more powerful and expensive cars; it earned praise for its handling and acceleration.

A key part of the kit's success was Chapman's offering a comprehensive package in the Mark VI, including most of the special parts needed, not just the chassis. The Mark VI chassis came with mounting points for several different engines, including the 1172 cc (71.5ci) Ford 10, the 1250 cc or 1500 cc MG TF, the 1500 cc (92 ci) Consul, and the exalted Coventry Climax. Standardized as far as possible for volume production, some units were customized per the owner's wishes. Lotus even modified the owner's parts, if needed. The success of the Mark VI in competition and sales (100 built by 1955) established Chapman as a manufacturer of specialty cars.

== Specifications ==
Number built: approximately 110
Weight: 432 kg (952 lb)

=== Drivetrain ===
Engine: Ford E93A straight 4
Engine location: front, longitudinally mounted
Displacement: 1172 cc / 71.5 in³
Valvetrain: 2 valves per cylinder, sidevalve
Fuel feed: SU carburettors
Aspiration: naturally aspirated
Gearbox: Ford 3-speed manual
Drive: Rear Wheel Drive

=== Performance ===
Power: 50 bhp / 37 kW at 5000 rpm
Torque: 77 Nm / 57 ft·lbf at 3000 rpm
BHP/litre: 43 bhp / litre (0.7 hp/ci)
Power-to-weight ratio: 0.12 bhp / kg
0-60 mph: 15.0 s
Top speed: 150 km/h (93 mph)

== Bibliography ==
- Ludvigsen, Karl (2010). Colin Chapman: Inside the Innovator. Haynes Publishing. ISBN 978-1-84425-413-2.
- William Taylor, The Lotus Book: The Complete History of Lotus Cars Coterie Press, Limited.1998, pp. 20–21.
