= Aviation Heritage Museum (Western Australia) =

Aviation museum in Bull Creek, Western Australia

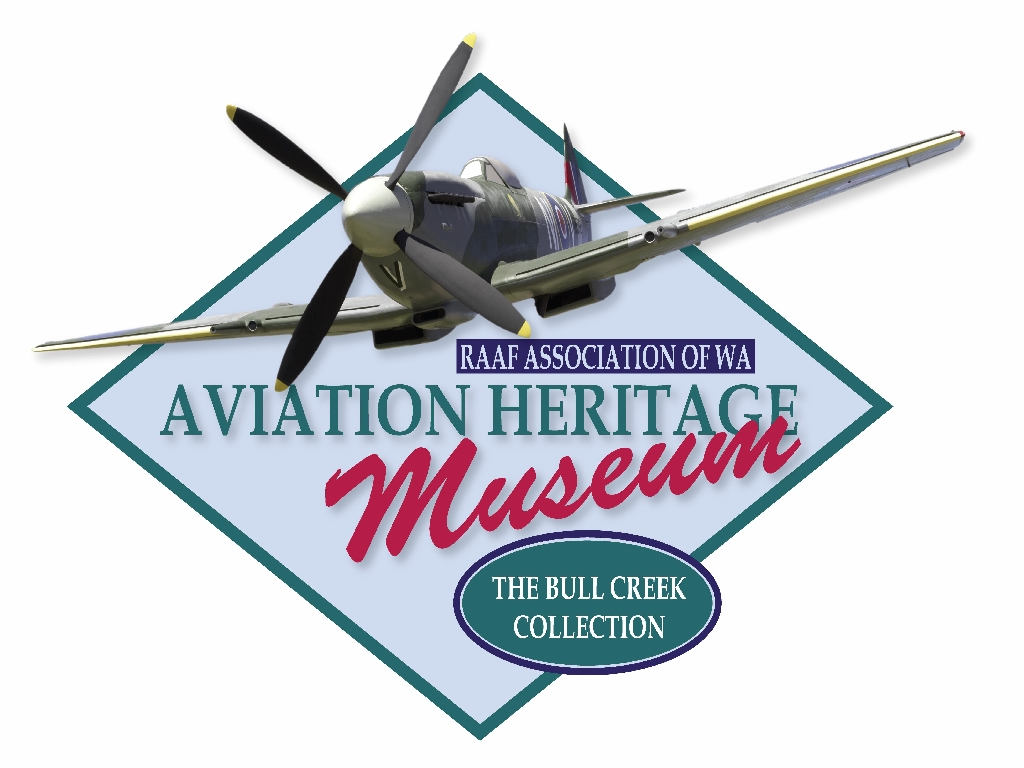
- Established: 17 November 1979; 46 years ago
- Location: Bull Creek, Western Australia
- Coordinates: 32°02′57″S 115°51′32″E
- Type: Aviation museum
- Website: aviationmuseumwa.org.au

Western Australia Heritage Register
- Official name: Aviation Heritage Museum of WA
- Reference no.: 12166
- Assessed: 10 August 2018

The Aviation Heritage Museum is a museum located in Bull Creek, Perth, Western Australia. Created and maintained by the Air Force Association (Note: Formerly Royal Australian Air Force Association and before that Australian Flying Corp Association.) of Western Australia, it houses many military and civilian aircraft, aircraft replicas and aircraft engines, of types that have served in the Royal Australian Air Force or that have relevance to aviation in Western Australia.

== History ==
The Western Australian division of the association acquired a Mark 22 Supermarine Spitfire from England in 1959 and erected it on a pole outside its headquarters in Perth. On 1 December 1962 the association acquired an Avro Lancaster from the French. Many other exhibits of interest to association members and the public were obtained in the following years. With financial assistance from the Western Australian Government a museum building was erected at the association's memorial estate in Bull Creek, officially opening in November 1979. In order to house the Avro Lancaster and a Douglas Dakota, the association raised funds and erected a second museum building that was opened in December 1983. Since then many smaller buildings have been added, including a 48,000 book library, photo lab, workshop, model repair shop and technical library.

The museum acquired a Tornado in 2022 and a Hornet in 2023.

== Gallery ==
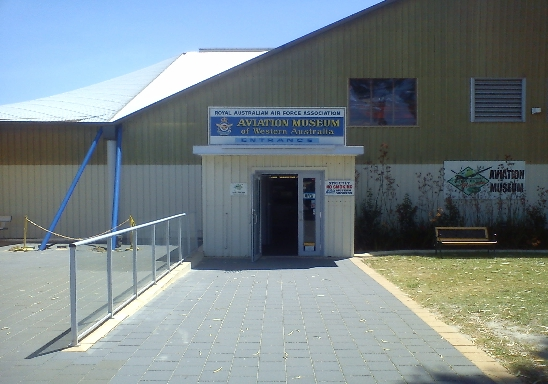
Main entrance

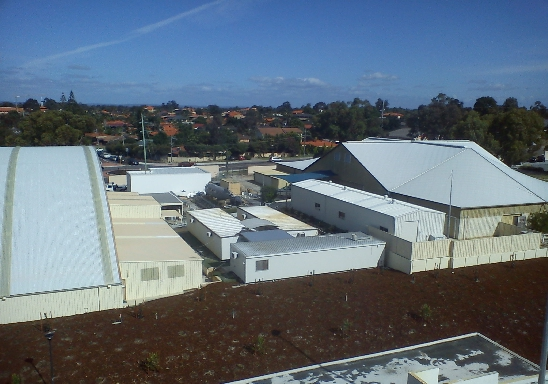
Aviation Heritage Museum

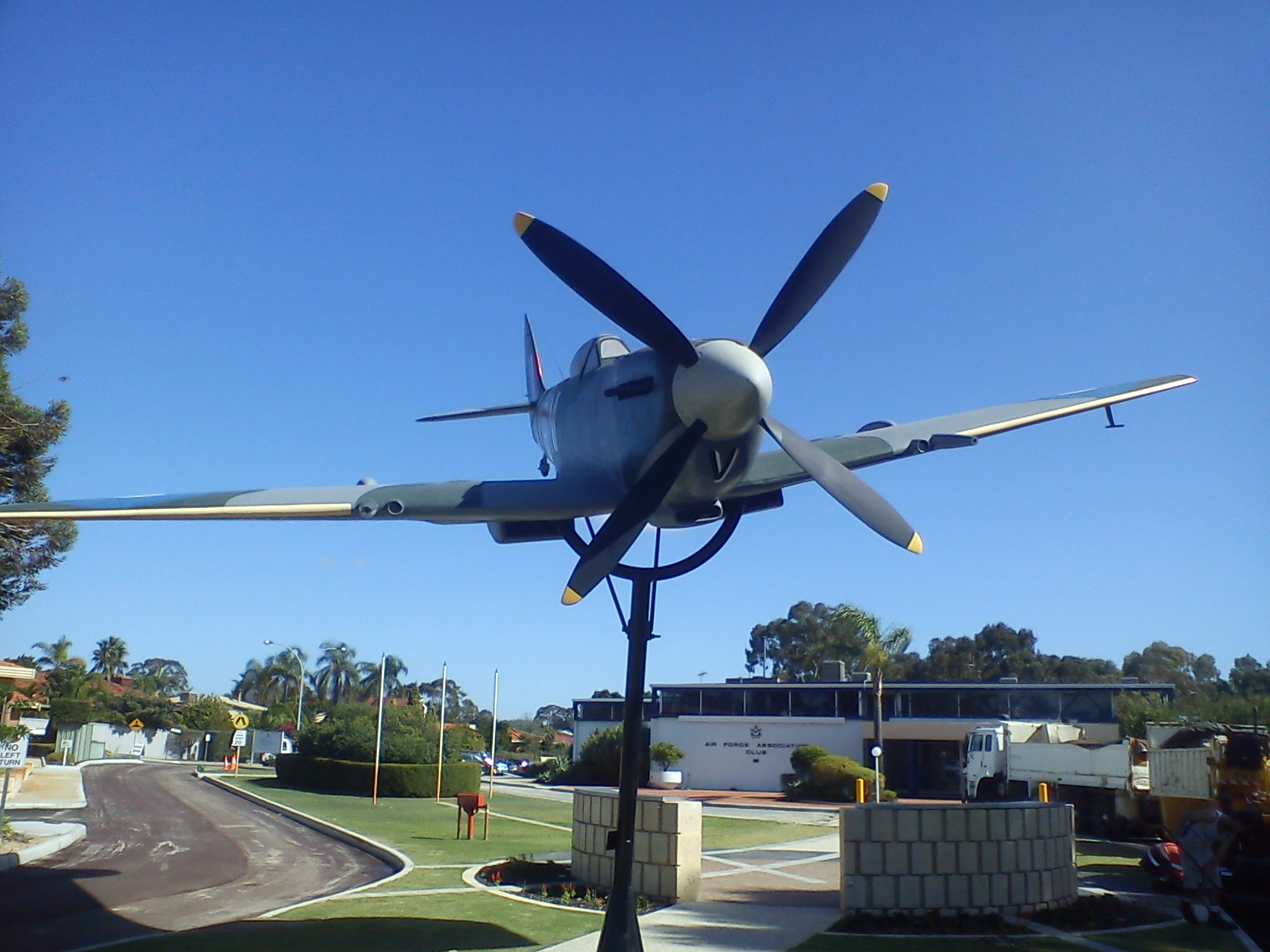
Spitfire memorial, located on the southern side of the south wing

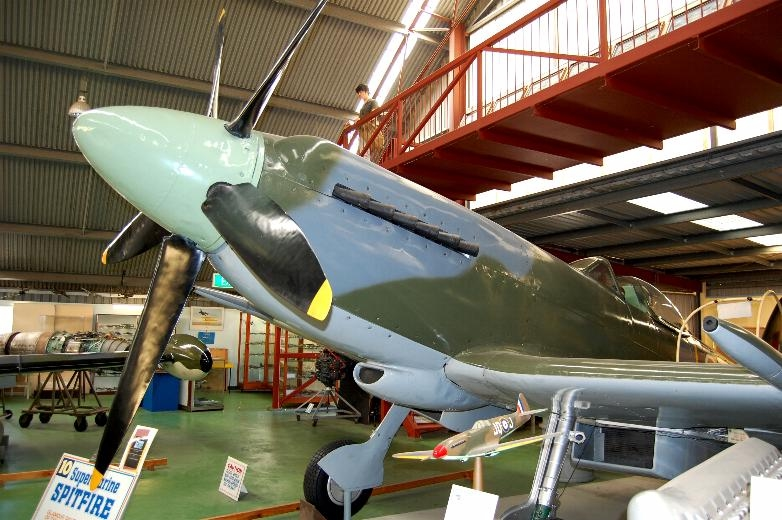
Mark 22 Supermarine Spitfire, housed in the north wing

== Displays ==
The following exhibits are on static display in the museum:

=== Aircraft ===
- AerMacchi MB-326H
- Auster J-5 Adventurer
- Avro Anson
- Avro Lancaster B VII NX622
- Bell UH-1H Iroquois
- Bensen gyrocopter
- CAC Wackett
- CAC Wirraway
- Consolidated PBY Catalina
- De Havilland DH-82 Tiger Moth
- De Havilland DH-94 Moth Minor
- De Havilland Vampire
- Douglas Dakota
- English Electric Canberra, license built by Government Aircraft Factories
- Gardan GY-80 Horizon (Sugar Bird Lady)
- General Dynamics F-111C crew module ("ejectable cockpit")
- Link Trainer - early flight simulator
- McDonnell Douglas F/A-18 Hornet A21-101
- Mignet Pou-du-Ciel (Flying Flea)
- Panavia Tornado GR4
- Parasol
- Percival Proctor Mk. III
- RotorWay Scorpion helicopter
- Supermarine Spitfire Mk. 22
- Tandem unmanned aerial vehicle for mining applications

=== Aircraft replicas ===
- Bristol Tourer
- Hawker Hurricane - 5/8 scale
- Santos-Dumont Demoiselle
- Sopwith Camel
- Bede BD-5
- Sandhawk missile & launcher
- Supermarine Spitfire (outside, at the entrance)

=== Engines ===
- Armstrong Siddeley Genet Major
- Armstrong Siddeley Genet Minor
- Armstrong Siddeley Cheetah
- Blackburne Tomtit
- Blackburn Cirrus
- Pratt & Whitney Wasp
- Rolls-Royce Avon
- Rolls-Royce Dart
- Rolls-Royce Derwent
- Rolls-Royce Griffon
- Rolls-Royce Merlin
- Sunbeam DYAK 1 (First Qantas engine)
- Wright Whirlwind
- Wright Cyclone
- Wright R-3350
- Armstrong Siddeley Mamba
- Rolls-Royce Nene
- Rolls-Royce Viper
- Turbomeca Turmo

The museum specimen of the R-3350 is the no. 1 engine from a C-121G Super Constellation from NASA, registration N421NA. This Constellation flew between Geraldton and the Carnarvon satellite tracking station in support of the Apollo space program.

=== Artefacts ===
- Remains from the NASA Skylab. These were found in Western Australia, after Skylab's re-entry into the Earth's atmosphere in 1979.

== See also ==
- RAAF Museum
- RAAF Wagga Heritage Centre
- List of aerospace museums
