= RAAF Wagga Heritage Centre =

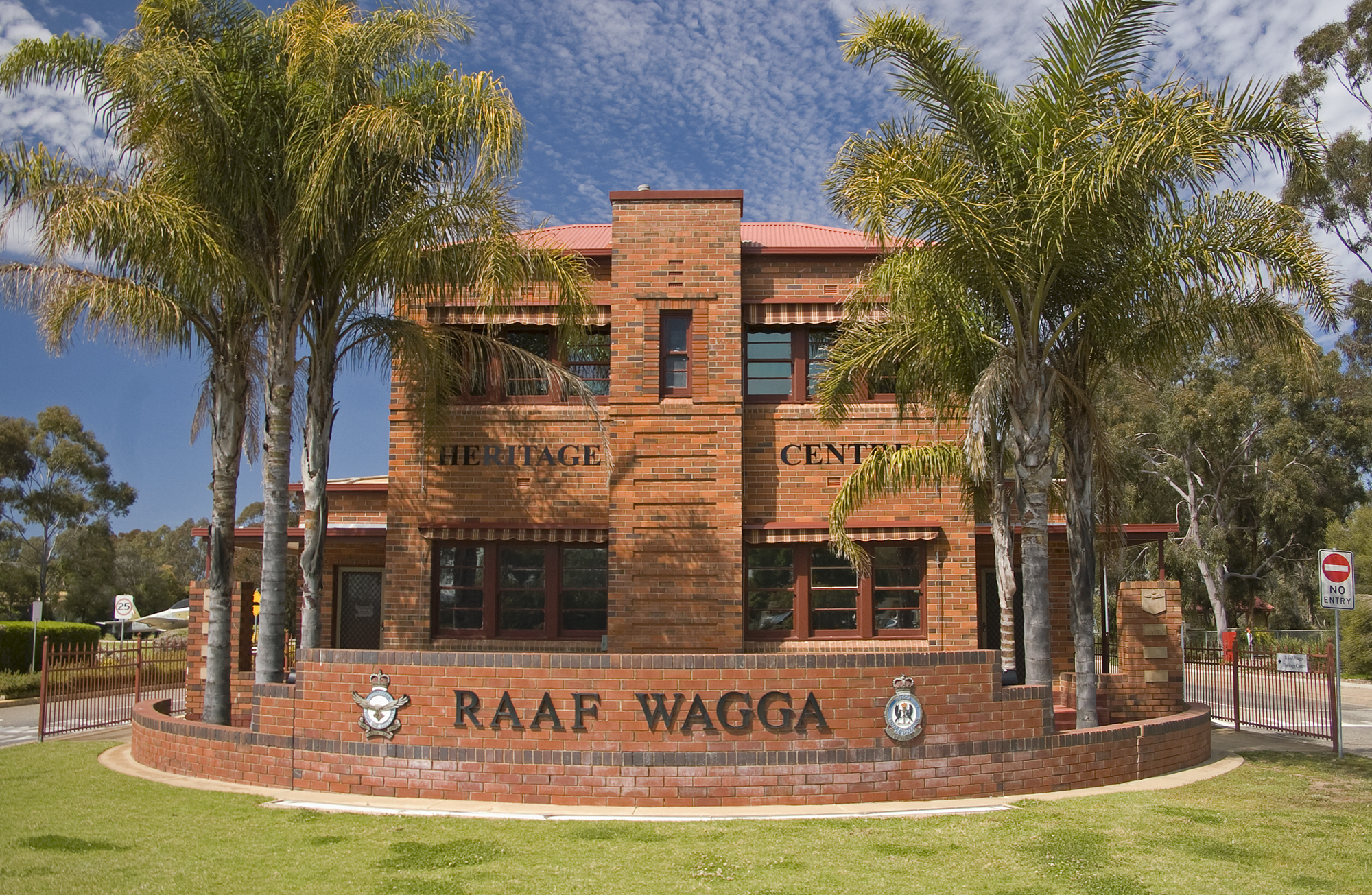
- Established: 24 June 1995
- Location: Stuart Highway, Forest Hill, New South Wales
- Coordinates: 35.1492°S 147.4678°E
- Type: Military museum
- Website: www.airforce.gov.au

RAAF Wagga Heritage Centre is a military museum at the entrance to RAAF Base Wagga, on the Sturt Highway, Forest Hill, New South Wales. The heritage centre has indoor and outdoor displays of aircraft, memorabilia and photographs relating to the Royal Australian Air Force in the Riverina.

== History ==
The RAAF Wagga Heritage Centre opened in June 1995 with items from RAAF Base Wagga and items which were donated by the community. The museum was closed in 2001 for refurbishment, with the memorabilia temporarily relocated to the RAAF Museum at Point Cook. Plans to reopen the museum were scrapped after the Royal Australian Air Force (RAAF) adopted a new policy in 2003 to only fund the museum at Point Cook.

AirCare (a Wagga Wagga-based association providing social support services to current and former members of the RAAF) and local newspaper The Daily Advertiser ran a campaign during late September and early October 2008 in an attempt to reverse the Australian Defence Force's decision.

On 13 December 2008, it was announced that the museum would be reopening in 2009. The RAAF would spend $75,000 to complete the refurbishment of the museum building.

In May 2009, a public consultation meeting was held to discuss plans for the centre, including the $130,000 set aside by the RAAF for outfitting the building for a future heritage display.

The heritage centre was officially opened on 12 October 2010.

== See also ==
- RAAF Aviation Heritage Museum
- List of aerospace museums
