= Sasin Spraymaster =

Australian agricultural aircraft

SA-29 Spraymaster

General information
- Type: Agricultural aircraft
- Manufacturer: Sasin Aircraft Service
- Number built: 3

History
- Introduction date: 1965
- First flight: 1965
- Developed from: de Havilland Canada DHC-1 Chipmunk

The Sasin SA-29 Spraymaster was an agricultural aircraft designed and manufactured in Australia in the 1960s by Sasin Aircraft Service of Goulburn, New South Wales in conjunction with Aerostructures at Sydney's Bankstown Airport.

== Design and development ==
By the 1960s the converted World War II-vintage types that comprised a large part of the Australian agricultural aircraft fleet were in need of replacement. Sasin Aircraft Service of Goulburn, an operator of a de Havilland Tiger Moth modified for use as an agricultural aircraft, decided to convert de Havilland Canada DHC-1 Chipmunks for agricultural use and contracted Aerostructures at Bankstown to perform the necessary modifications.

The starting point was a Mk. 10 or Mk. 21 version of the Chipmunk. The modifications included a redesigned fuselage to accommodate a 50 Imperial gallon (227 L) hopper located where the front seat was found in the original aircraft, and a completely new cockpit in the location of the original rear seat. An air-driven spray pump was mounted under the forward fuselage. The pilot sat 11 inches (28 cm) higher than in the original aircraft. A turnover truss and a new energy-absorbing seat were provided to protect the pilot from injury in a crash; and cable cutters were mounted in front of the cockpit as protection against one of the main hazards to agricultural aircraft (flying into power or telephone lines). A small dorsal fin and anti-spin strakes were fitted to the rear fuselage as well.

Modifications to the wing included endplates instead of the standard wingtips, the removal of wing root leading edge extensions and drooping the trailing edges. These modifications resulted in a lower stalling speed of 38 kn at a maximum takeoff weight (MTOW) of 2,300 lb compared to a 45 kn stalling speed at a 2,100 lb MTOW in the original aircraft. The Chipmunk's original de Havilland Gipsy Major engine was retained, but the original metal propeller was replaced with a lighter fine-pitch wooden propeller.

The prototype was built using two Chipmunks; the then- Department of Civil Aviation (now the Civil Aviation Safety Authority) found problems with the fuselage modifications, which necessitated modifying a second fuselage. The prototype first flew in mid-1965 and was granted a Type Certificate and Certificate of Airworthiness on 1 September 1965; it was then damaged beyond repair in a crash at Goulburn the following day. Two more aircraft were converted, one of which crashed in 1970. The remaining Spraymaster was restored to stock Chipmunk configuration in the mid-2000s for use as a Warbird.

Aerostructures proposed a more capable version with a 110-gallon (500 L) hopper, MTOW of 2,800 lb (1,270 kg), and a 210 hp Continental IO-360 engine. This was to be called the SA-29 Mk. 2. A larger aircraft with four seats and a one-ton hopper was also proposed; in the event neither design left the drawing board.

Aerostructures also performed a two-seat non-agricultural conversion called the Sundowner that had many of the same modifications as the Spraymaster, and which had wingtip fuel tanks as well.

== Specifications (DHC-1 Chipmunk) ==
Data from The Illustrated Encyclopedia of Aircraft in Australia and New Zealand

General characteristics

- Crew: 1
- Length: 25 ft 5 in (7.75 m)
- Wingspan: 34 ft 4 in (10.47 m)
- Height: 7 ft 0 in (2.1 m)
- Wing area: 172 sq ft (16.0 m^{2})
- Empty weight: 1,425 lb (646 kg)
- Max takeoff weight: 2,300 lb (1,043 kg)
- Powerplant: 1 × de Havilland Gipsy Major 10 Mk. 1 , 145 hp (108 kW)

Performance

- Maximum speed: 135 mph (217 km/h, 118 kn)
- Cruise speed: 86 mph (138 km/h, 75 kn)
- Stall speed: 41 mph (66 km/h, 38 kn)
- Rate of climb: 500 ft/min (2.5 m/s)
- Wing loading: 13.33 lb/sq ft (65.19 kg/m^{2})

== See also ==
Aircraft of comparable role, configuration, and era

- Piper Pawnee
- Yeoman Cropmaster
