= Lotus Mark V =

Chronology
- Predecessor: Lotus Mark IV
- Successor: Lotus Mark VI

Lotus Mark V was a prototype single seater sports car by Colin Chapman that was never built.

Chapman said that he believed a 100-mph road sports car could be developed using an un-supercharged Austin 7 engine. The Lotus Mark V was designed for it.
