= RAAF Base Wagga =

Air Force base

- Forest Hill; Near Wagga Wagga, New South Wales in Australia
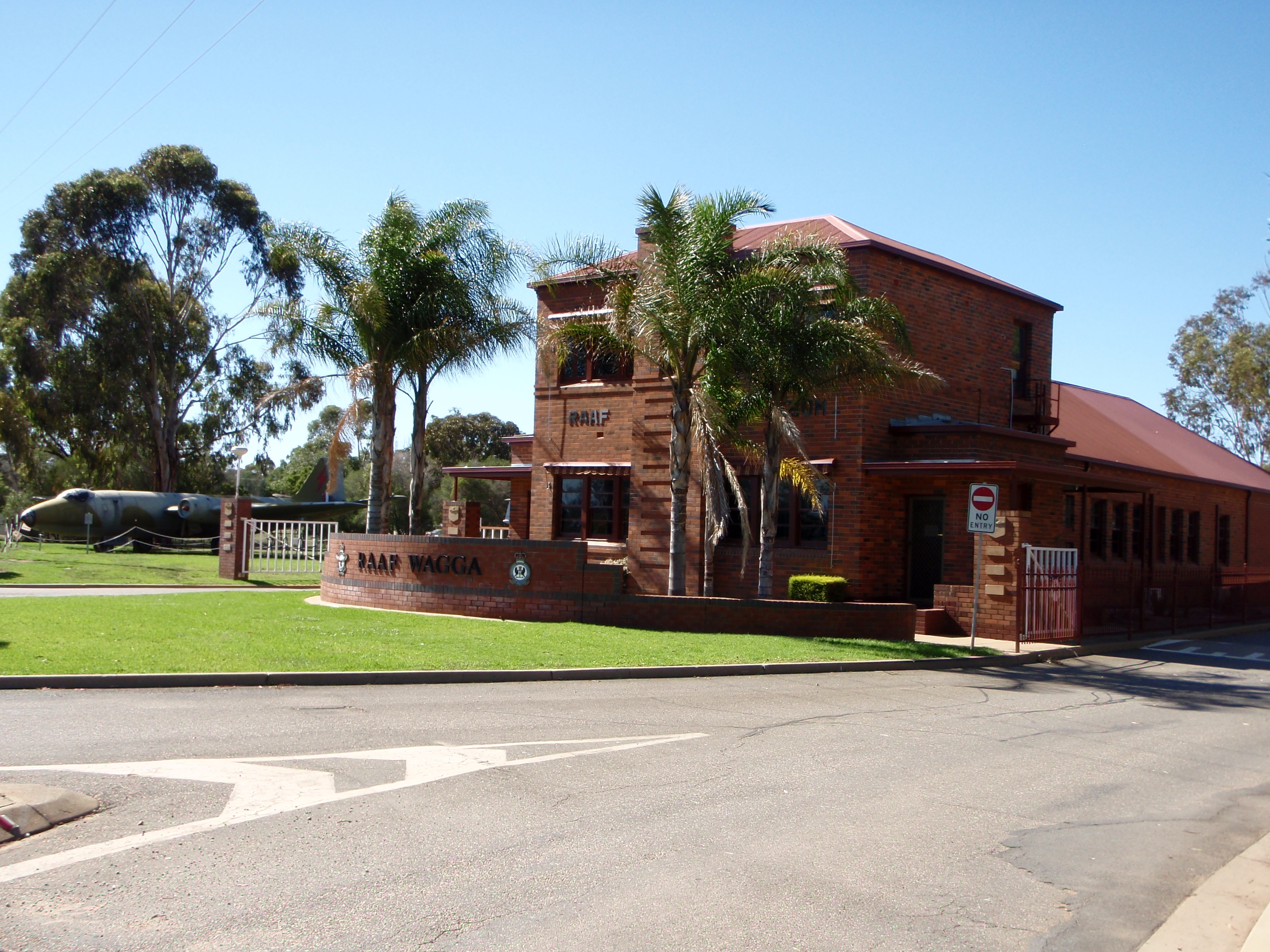
- Entry to RAAF Base Wagga

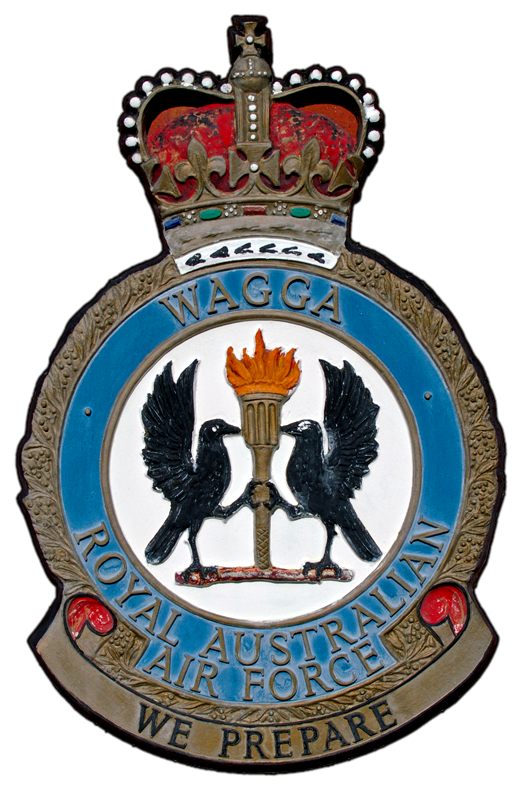
- Crest of RAAF Wagga

Site information
- Type: Military air base
- Owner: Department of Defence
- Operator: Royal Australian Air Force
- Controlled by: City of Wagga Wagga (airfield only)
- Website: RAAF Base Wagga

Location
- Location in New South Wales
- Coordinates: 35°09′55″S 147°27′59″E

Site history
- Built: 29 July 1940
- In use: 29 July 1940 – present

Garrison information
- Occupants: No. 31 Squadron RAAF

Airfield information
- Identifiers: IATA: WGA, ICAO: YSWG
- Elevation: 221 metres (724 ft) AMSL
Runways
Direction	Length and surface
05/23	1,768 metres (5,801 ft) Asphalt
12/30	894 metres (2,933 ft) Clay
- Source: Enroute Supplement Australia from Airservices Australia

RAAF Base Wagga (formerly RAAF Base Forest Hill) is a Royal Australian Air Force (RAAF) military air base located 11 kilometres (6.8 mi) south-east of Wagga Wagga, in the suburb of Forest Hill, New South Wales, Australia.

The base is home to No 31 Squadron and Ground Academy (GA), including No 1 Recruit Training Unit (1RTU), the Air Force's basic recruit training school. It is the main ground training base for RAAF Aviators of the technical, administration and logistics trades, as well as the location for initial courses for Administration and Logistics Officers. RAAF Wagga is also home to most Air Force Professional Military Education. In addition, Air Force, Army and Navy personnel undertake technical airworthiness training at the RAAF School of Technical Training (RAAFSTT).

The local Australian Air Force Cadets squadron, 332 SQN, hosts weekly parades on Tuesday nights at RAAF Base Wagga, and 3 Wing Australian Air Force Cadets formerly used RAAF Base Wagga to hold their biannual promotion courses (in January and July until the end of 2022, then once more in July 2023).

Owned by the Government of Australia, the base is managed by the RAAF with the exception of the airfield that is leased to the City of Wagga Wagga. Although military aircraft still use the airfield, the airfield is now called Wagga Wagga Airport.

== History ==
In 1939 the Government of Australia purchased the 120-hectare (300-acre) farm, Allonville and commenced building the facility. Called RAAF Base Forest Hill, the base commenced operations on 29 July 1940 and was home to the No. 2 Flying Training School. Part of the British Commonwealth Air Training Plan (or Empire Training Scheme), No. 31 Squadron flew from the base in 1942, flying Bristol Beaufighters and served in combat during World War II. Following the war, the base was declared home to the Ground Training School and in May 1950 RAAF School of Technical Training was established; and subsequently renamed as RAAF Base Wagga in 1952.

The School of Management and Training Technology was established in 1985, and disbanded in 2004. The School of Postgraduate Studies established in 1998. In January 1999 Ground Training Wing was established at RAAF Base Wagga and was amalgamated with RAAF College in 2008. RAAF College was relocated to RAAF Base Wagga in 2008 after having been established in 1947 at Point Cook, Victoria. The School of Administration and Logistics Training was established in 2005. The No. 1 Recruit Training Unit relocated from RAAF Base Edinburgh to RAAF Base Wagga in 2008. In December 2009 Ground Training Wing was reestablished after splitting from RAAF College. No. 31 Squadron re-formed in July 2010 after disbanding in 1946.

While no flying squadrons are based at Wagga, a number of decommissioned RAAF and Army aircraft, including a GAF Nomad and several Aermacchi MB-326 airframes have been allocated to RAAFSTT for use as ground training aids and remain on site. The unit also acquired three Fairchild Swearingen Metroliner airframes in 1999, which in 2005 were found to contain asbestos, raising concerns about hazardous exposure by military instructors, trainees and civilian staff.

== Units ==
The following units are located at RAAF Base Wagga:

Unit	Unit name	Force Element Group	Aircraft	Notes
HQ GA	Headquarters Ground Academy	Air Force Training Group	—N/a	
31SQN	No. 31 (City of Wagga Wagga) Squadron	Combat Support Group	—N/a	—N/a
RAAFSTT	School of Technical Training	Air Force Training Group	—N/a	—N/a
RAAFSALT	School of Administration and Logistics Training	Air Force Training Group	—N/a	
SPS	School of Postgraduate Studies	Air Force Training Group	—N/a	—N/a
1RTU	No. 1 Recruit Training Unit	Air Force Training Group	—N/a	—N/a
332SQN AAFC	No. 332 SQN (City of Wagga Wagga) Australian Air Force Cadets	Australian Air Force Cadets	N/a	N/a

=== Headquarters Ground Academy ===
Headquarters Ground Academy (HQGA) was formed on 1 January 2019 as a result of the amalgamation of Headquarters RAAF College and Headquarters Ground Training Wing in order to realise Chief of Air Force intent to modernise Air Force education and training.

HQGA will realise important organisational changes and efficiencies to better align functions, roles and responsibilities and performance management across Air Force Training Group (AFTG). The main focus of Ground Academy is to provide through-life education and training, and deliver enhanced leadership skills and professional mastery, through modern learning tools, methods and processes across all levels and specialisations.

HQGA enables the Officer Commanding Ground Academy (OC GA) through executive staff support, the conduct of training design and development and by delivering centralised administration, logistics and training support to GA units across Australia.

=== No. 31 (City of Wagga Wagga) Squadron ===
Number 31 (City of Wagga Wagga) Squadron (31SQN) is responsible for the Airbase capability management, air operations support and the military coordination of RAAF Base Wagga. 31SQN also delivers Combat Support Group's support to the training activities conducted by the Ground Academy at RAAF Base Wagga.

31SQN's mission statement is to provide permanent Airbase operations and support the sustainment of ADF training at RAAF Base Wagga. In order to achieve this mission 31SQN provides a number of necessary functions that directly support and assist with the delivery of Induction, Initial Employment Training and Postgraduate Training. 31SQN services include Base Command and Control, coordination of Airbase operations, support to ADF exercises, ceremonial functions, Mechanical Equipment Operations and Maintenance Section (MEOMS) and Road Movements. 31SQN undertakes the important roles of maintaining and improving relationships with the traditional custodians of the land, the Wiradjuri people, through the RAAF Base Wagga Indigenous Liaison Officer (ILO). 31SQN also plays a major role with the coordination of Air Force Reserve members in the Riverina region, along with the coordination and facilitation of base-wide events including VIP visits.

=== RAAFSTT ===
The RAAF School of Technical Training (RAAFSTT) provides initial employment training for aviation technical trades for Army, Navy and Air Force to meet nationally accredited aeroskills competencies. RAAFSTT also delivers post-graduate courses to engineering officers and senior technicians operating in ADF aviation.

The Defence Aeroskills Training Academy (DATA), a contracted training organisation operated by BAE Systems with its partner Pennant Training Systems delivers all aviation technical and engineering training at RAAFSTT. Military training, mentoring, and management of trainee progress, discipline and welfare is provided by RAAFSTT staff. Both RAAFSTT and DATA work closely to foster and develop the desired attitudes and behaviours in trainees for their employment in the ADF maintenance environment.

RAAFSTT is one of the most diverse training units in the Air Force. The School has an annual throughput of around 900 trainees and students and is responsible for the conduct of over 25 different technical courses. Graduates of RAAFSTT maintain aircraft, aviation components, armament systems, life support equipment for aircrew and other technical equipment, in addition to managing maintenance processes at all levels.

=== RAAFSALT ===
The Royal Australian Air Force School of Administration and Logistics Training (RAAFSALT) was established on 1 December 2005. RAAFSALT was formed when three former training centres - RAAF School of Technical Training Squadron of Clerical and Supply Training (SCST), Ground Training Wing Health Services Training Flight (HSTF) and Ground Training Wing Training Programs Development Flight (TPDF) were amalgamated. In 2014, the RAAF Training Flight of Air Mobility Training and Development Unit (AMTDU) was integrated into RAAFSALT. The Unit now operates from four detachments (Wagga, Richmond, Amberley, and Darwin) and consists of 101 personnel across a variety of service categories. RAAFSALT is the second largest Air Force learning institution in terms of annual student throughput and is responsible for the provision of initial and post-initial employment training in support of personnel, logistics, and training systems capability. The RAAFSALT mission is to provide relevant, engaging and innovative learning that meets the capability requirements for the Royal Australian Air Force and broader Australian Defence Force now and into the future.

=== School of Postgraduate Studies ===
The School of Postgraduate Studies (SPS) is responsible for delivery of Professional Military Education to Royal Australian Air Force members at key points within their careers; and for the delivery of training to personnel selected for Squadron Warrant Officer, Base Warrant Officer, or command appointments.

SPS introduced Air Force's new Professional Military Education program, Program Wirraway in 2019. Program Wirraway plays a key role in developing the workforce to operate in rapidly changing, and ambiguous environments. Program Wirraway will develop people with innovative and inquiring minds, who can work as part of a disciplined team drawn from all services, the APS, Industry and other Government Agencies. Program Wirraway will ensure Airmen have the requisite knowledge, skills, behaviours and attributes to enable the integrated and networked, 5th-Generation Air Force for Australia.

=== 1RTU ===
The role of No 1 Recruit Training Unit (1RTU) is to prepare recruits, newly enlisted Air Force men and women, for military service. Recruit training involves the transformation of civilians into aviators who have basic military skills, knowledge and behaviours to become effective members of the Air Force team. This transformation occurs over nine weeks of training.

=== No. 332 (City of Wagga Wagga) Squadron, Australian Air Force Cadets ===
The wartime Air Training Corps unit was established at Wagga in July 1942 as 45 Squadron of 2 Wing NSW. This unit was disbanded at the conclusion of the war with the final intake occurring in October 1944. Over the duration of the war the Wagga Wagga Air Training Corps trained a total of 56 aircrew and 41 general musterings who went on to serve in the war effort with the RAAF.

The current Squadron was formed in Wagga Wagga as 32 Flight, NSW Squadron Air Training Corp in 1980 with a strength of 15 cadets. The unit operated from the RAAF School of Technical Training, located on RAAF Base Wagga Wagga.

32 Flight was honoured with the granting of Freedom of Entry to the City of Wagga Wagga in 1985 and as a result became 32 ‘City of Wagga Wagga’ Flight.

In mid 2001, as a result of a nationwide restructure of the Australian Defence Force Cadets, 32 Flight Air Training Corps became 332 Squadron Australian Air Force Cadets.

== Aircraft on display ==
A number of aircraft are on static display next to the RAAF Wagga Heritage Centre as gate guardians, adjacent to the Sturt Highway:

- Dassault Mirage III, located as a gate guardian at RAAF Base Wagga in the 1980s.
- Macchi MB-326
- Gloster Meteor
- English Electric Canberra, which flew during the Vietnam War and located as a gate guardian at RAAF Base Wagga in the 1980s.
- General Dynamics F-111

=== Gate guardians ===
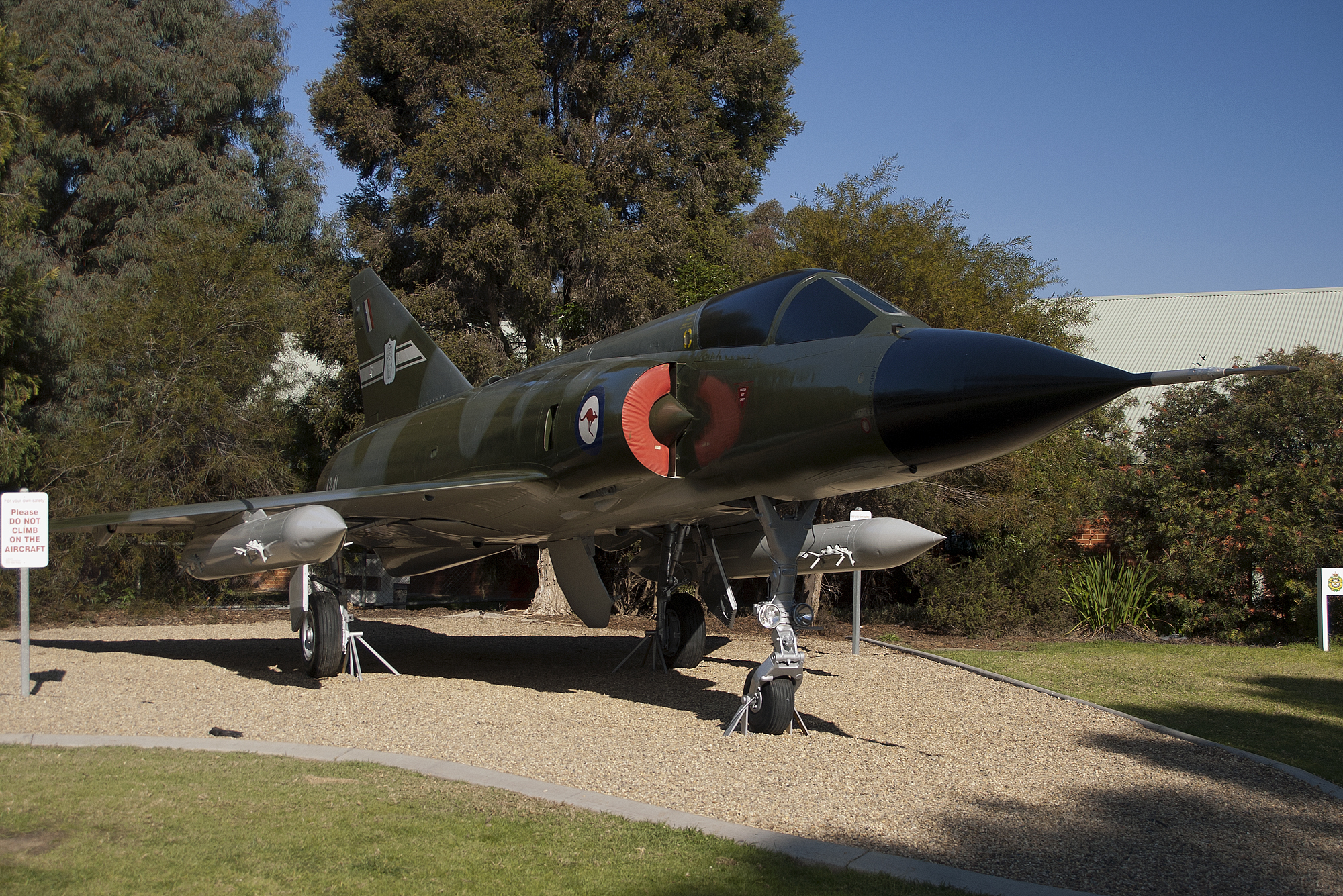
A3-41 Dassault Mirage III in No. 77 Squadron RAAF livery

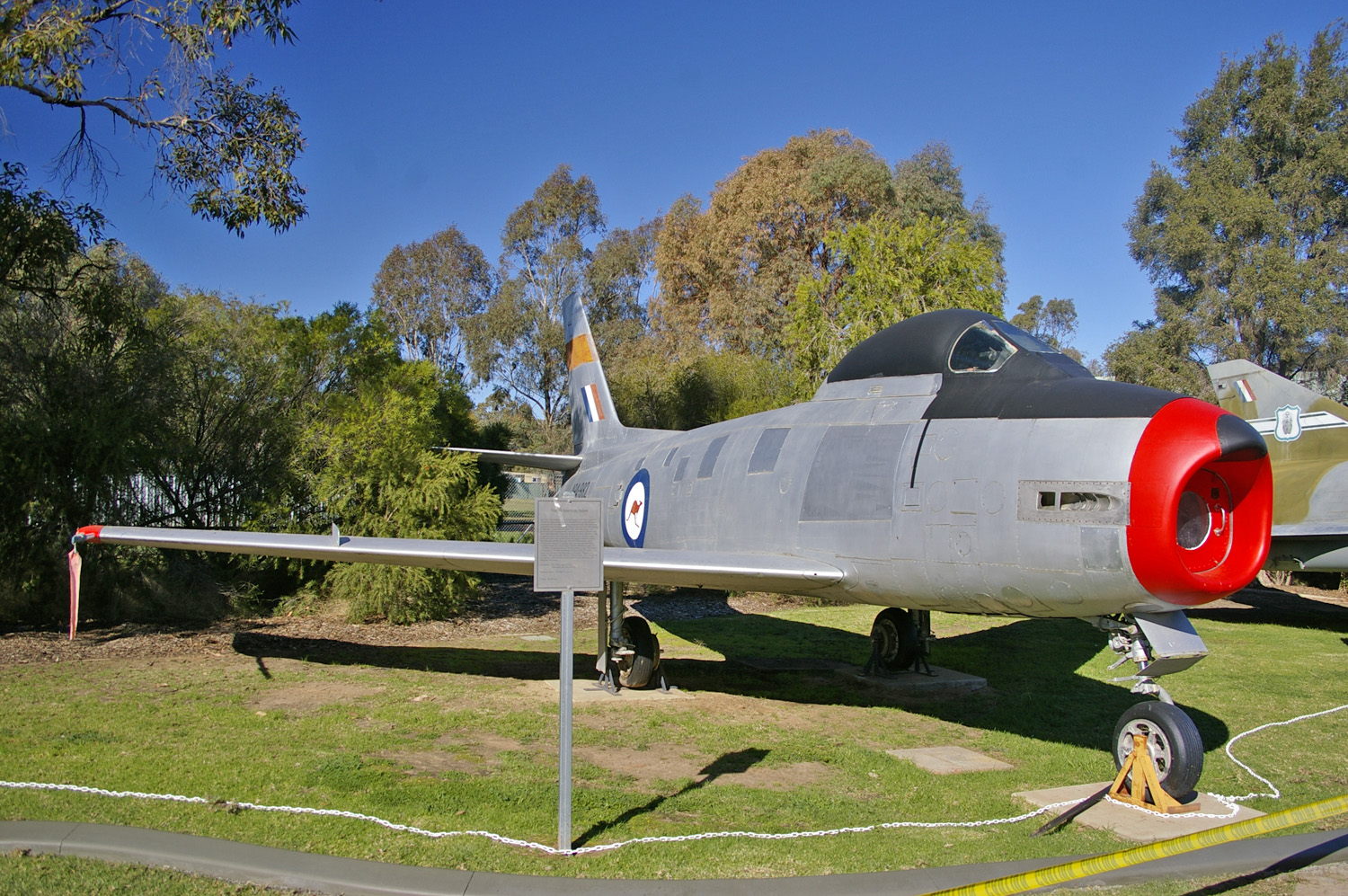
CAC Sabre Mk 32 (A94-982)

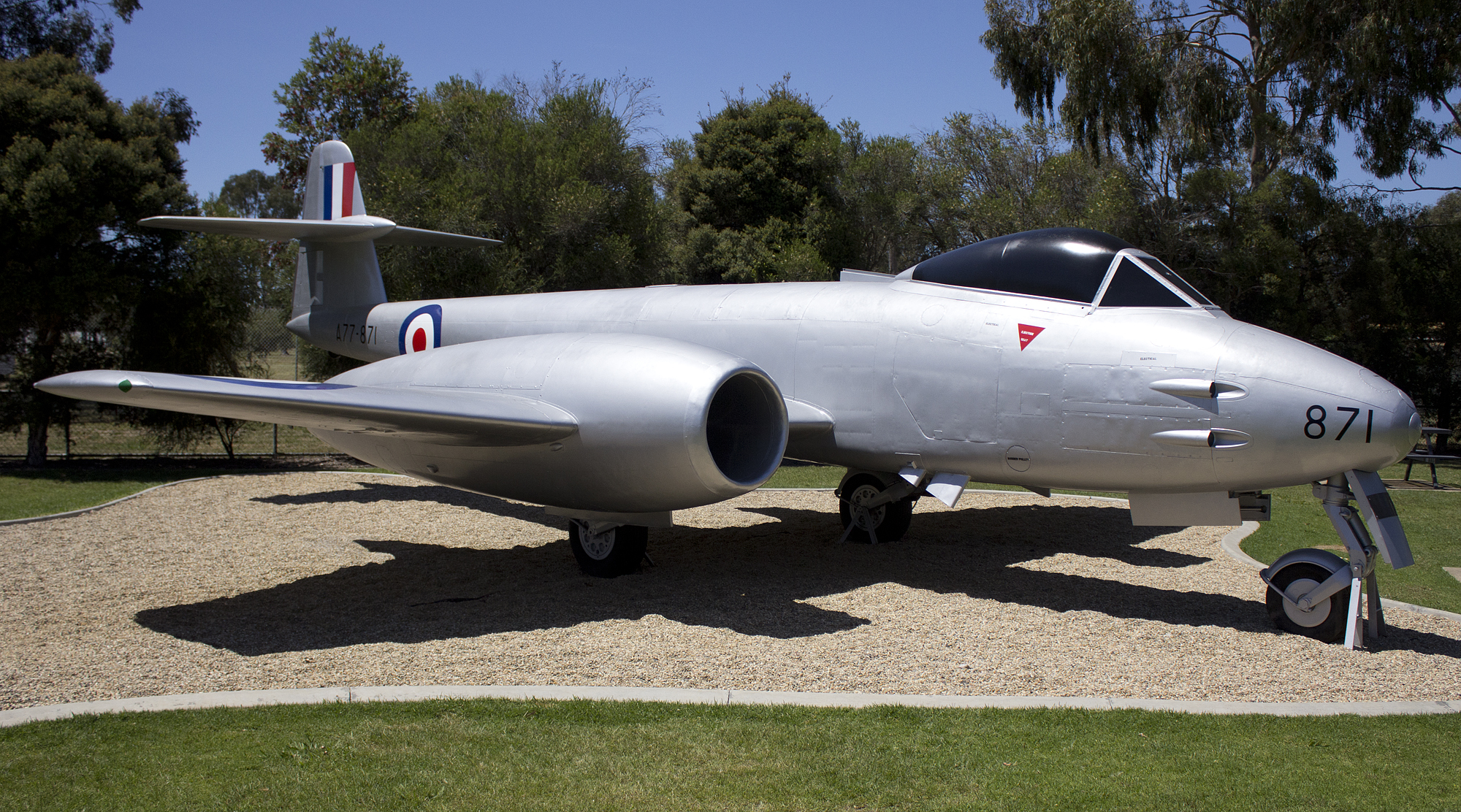
A77-871 (WK791) Gloster Meteor F 8

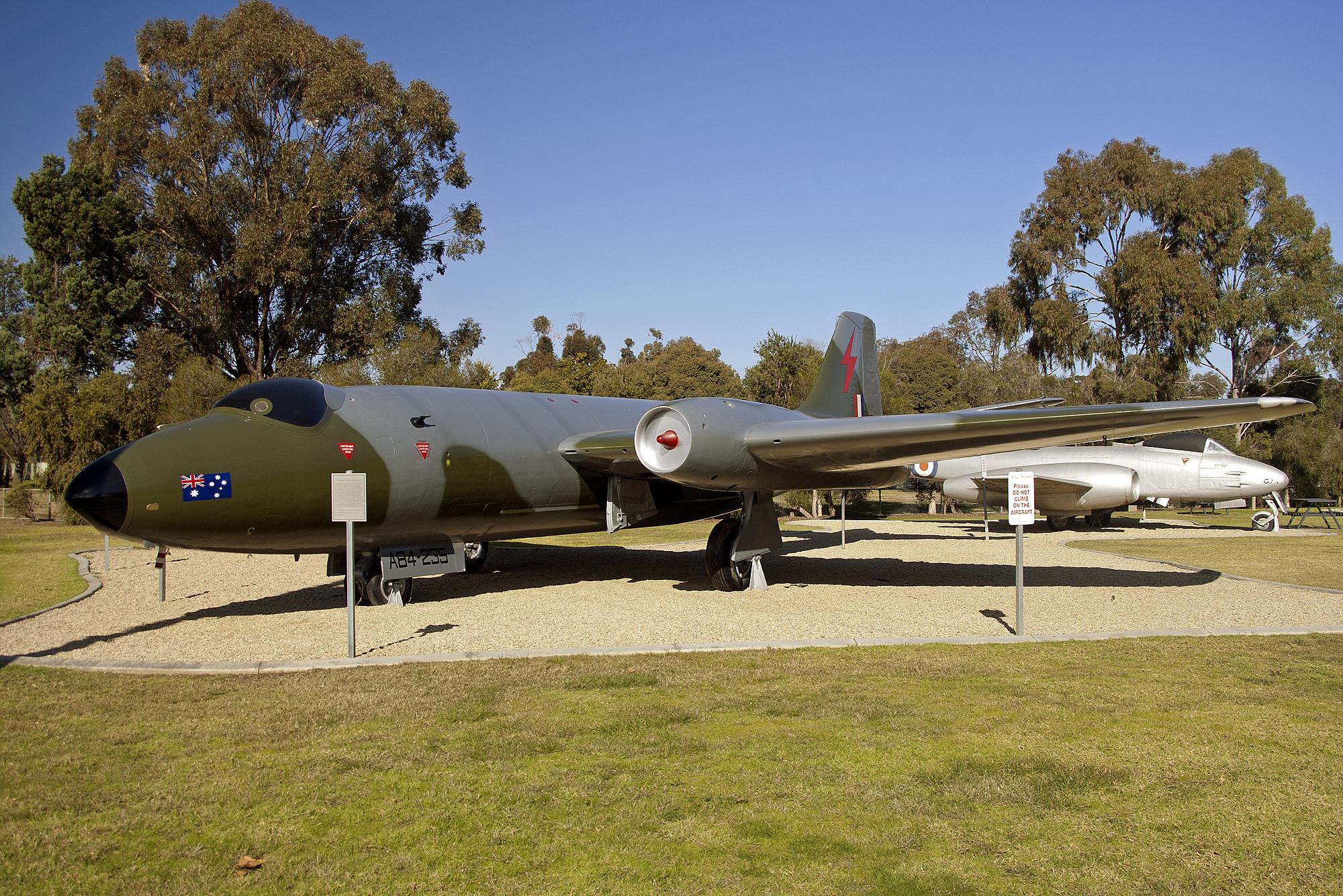
A84-235 English Electric Canberra Mk 20 in No. 2 Squadron RAAF livery

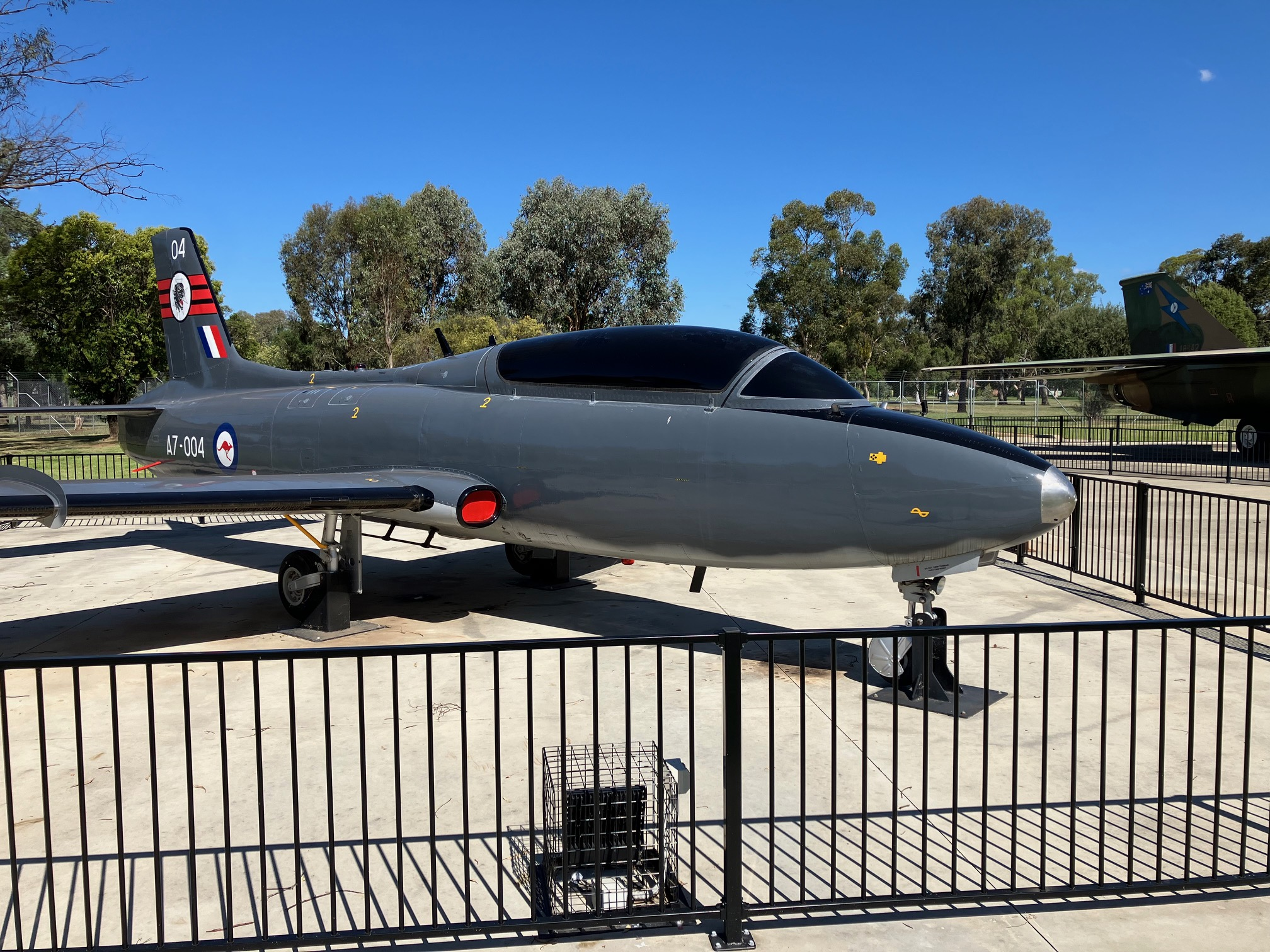
Macchi MB-326 formerly operated by the RAAF as A7-004

== See also ==
- List of Royal Australian Air Force installations
- RAAF Wagga Heritage Centre
