= Kingsford Smith Cropmaster =

Australian agricultural aircraft

Kingsford Smith KS-3 Cropmaster
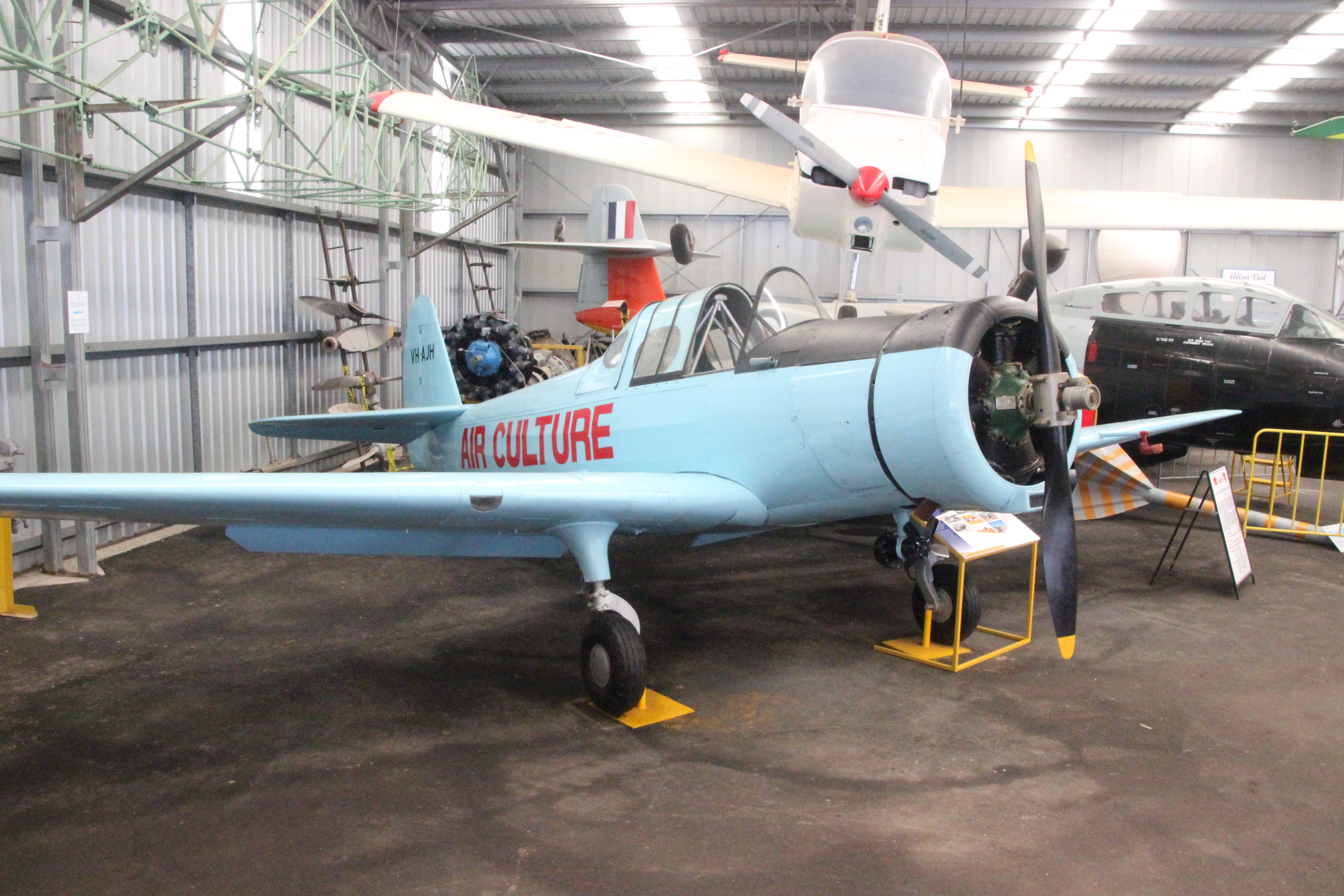
- KS-3 Cropmaster

General information
- Type: agricultural aircraft
- Manufacturer: Kingsford Smith Aviation Services Pty. Ltd.
- Designer: C. W. (Bill) Smith

History
- First flight: 1957
- Developed from: CAC Wackett

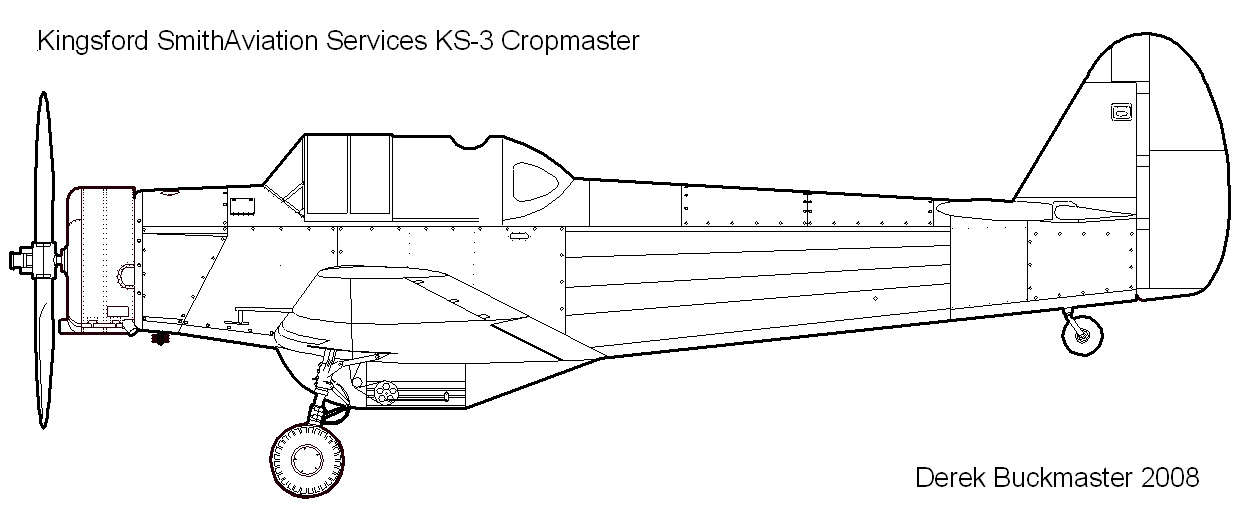

The KS-3 Cropmaster was an Australian agricultural aircraft developed from the CAC Wackett, an aircraft used for training purposes during World War II.

== Design and development ==
The KS-3 was developed from the CAC Wackett by Kingsford Smith Aviation Services Pty. Ltd. (KSAS) for aerial top-dressing and spraying.

John Brown OBE had purchased KSAS in 1946 (the company was started by Sir Charles Kingsford Smith in 1933, but was defunct at the time of Brown's purchase) and made several attempts to develop an agricultural aircraft suitable for Australian conditions. Modifications to a war-surplus CAC Wackett airframe (C/N 283, VH-AJH) had resulted in the KS-1 and KS-2, but feedback from Bill Boulden (Chief Pilot at Airwork Pty Ltd in Perth) indicated the hopper should be placed behind the pilot, for better visibility, easier loading of the hopper and avoiding cleaning the windscreen after loading. KSAS converted Wackett C/N 299 to become the first KS-3 Cropmaster, and it had its first flight on 29 November 1957.

All KS-3 airframes were converted from war-surplus Wackett airframes. The changes included reducing the wing and tail-plane incidence, covering the fixed leading-edge slots, removing the rounded wing-tip fairings, adding a 13 cubic foot (400 litre) aluminium chemical hopper in place of the rear seat and modifying the control routes around the hopper outlet.

== Specifications (Kingsford Smith Aviation Services KS-3 Cropmaster) ==
Data from

General characteristics

- Crew: 1
- Length: 26 ft (7.9 m)
- Wingspan: 37 ft (11 m)
- Height: 7 ft 11 in (2.41 m)
- Wing area: 184 sq ft (17.1 m^{2})
- Airfoil: root: NACA 2216; tip: NACA 2209
- Gross weight: 2,620 lb (1,188 kg)
- Powerplant: 1 × Warner Super Scarab 7-cylinder air-cooled radial piston engine, 175 hp (130 kW)
- Propellers: 2-bladed fixed-pitch propeller

Performance

- Cruise speed: 97 mph (156 km/h, 84 kn)
- Wing loading: 14.2 lb/sq ft (69 kg/m^{2})

== See also ==
- Yeoman Cropmaster
