= Yeoman Cropmaster =

Australian agricultural aircraft

Yeoman Cropmaster YA-1
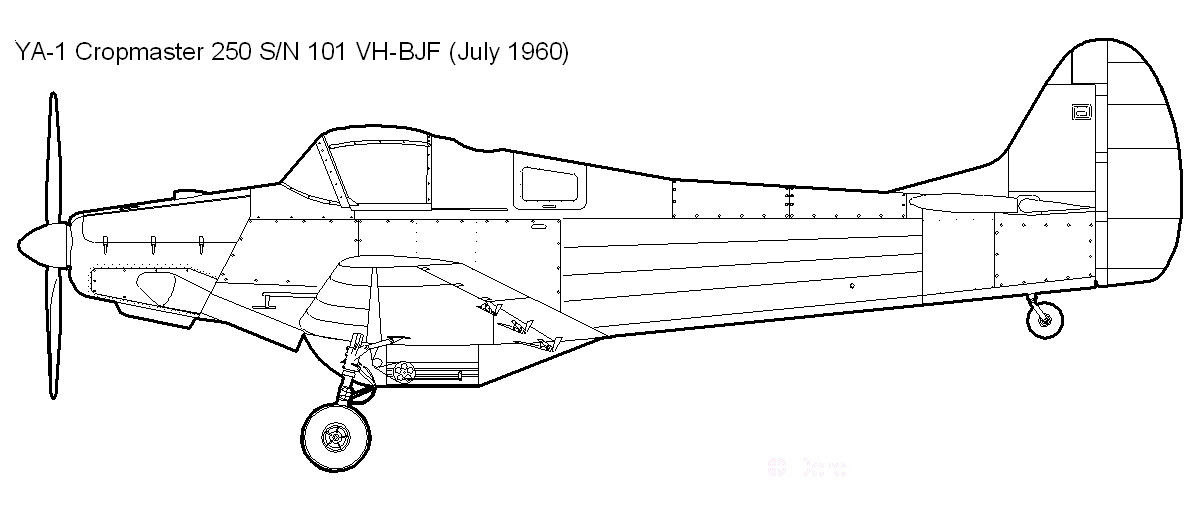
- Cropmaster 250R Series 2 ZK-CTX

General information
- Type: agricultural aircraft
- Manufacturer: Yeoman Aviation
- Designer: C. W. (Bill) Smith
- Number built: 21

History
- Manufactured: 1960–1966
- Introduction date: 1960
- First flight: 15 January 1960
- Developed from: Kingsford Smith Cropmaster

The Yeoman Cropmaster was an Australian agricultural aircraft developed from the CAC Wackett trainer of World War II.

== Design and development ==
The type was developed by Yeoman Aviation, a company set up by Kingsford Smith Aviation Services Pty. Ltd. (KSA) at Bankstown Airport to engage in agricultural aircraft production. KSA had obtained a number of Wacketts following the type's retirement from Royal Australian Air Force service and had converted four for agricultural use as KS-3 Cropmasters in the second half of the 1950s. The conversion involved little more than the installation of a hopper located in the rear cockpit of the Wackett, the cutting of a hole in the centre section of the Wackett's wooden wing to allow the dispersal of the chemical load, and re-routing controls to bypass the hopper.

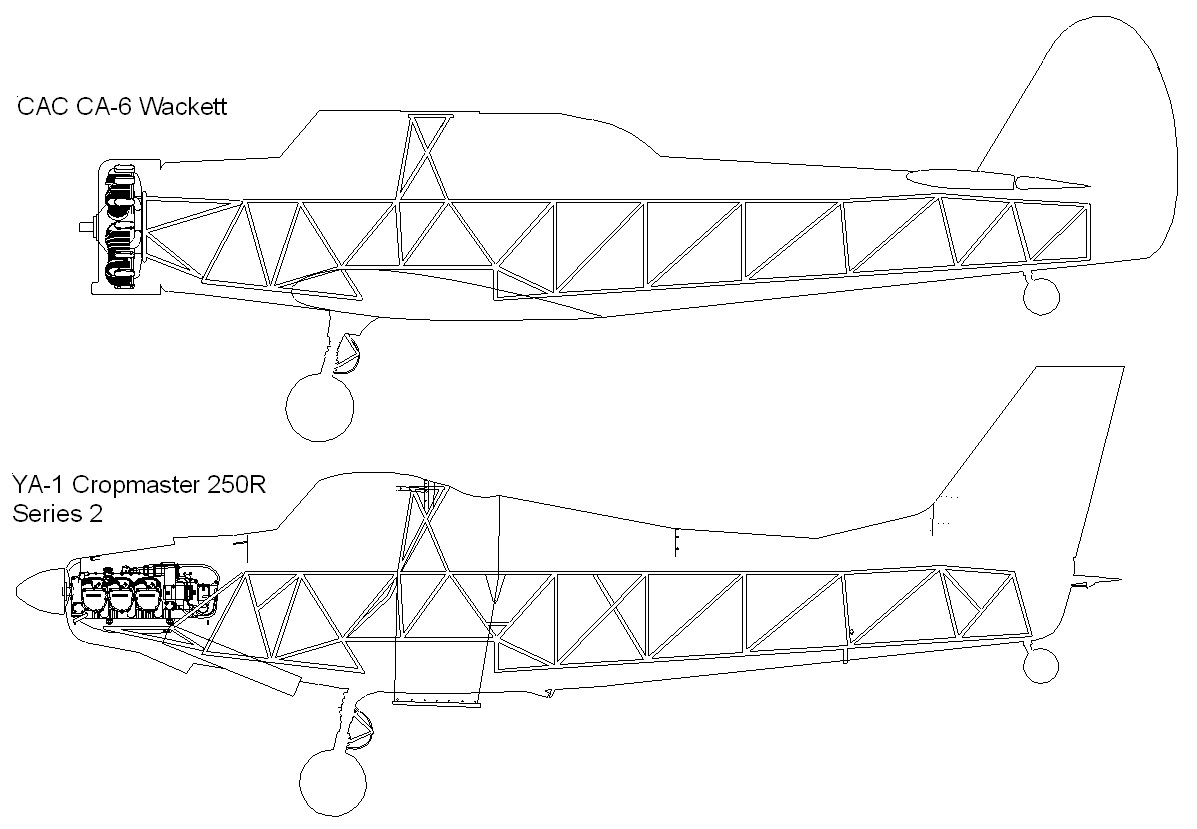
The Cropmaster and the CA-6 Wackett shared the same tubular steel fuselage frame

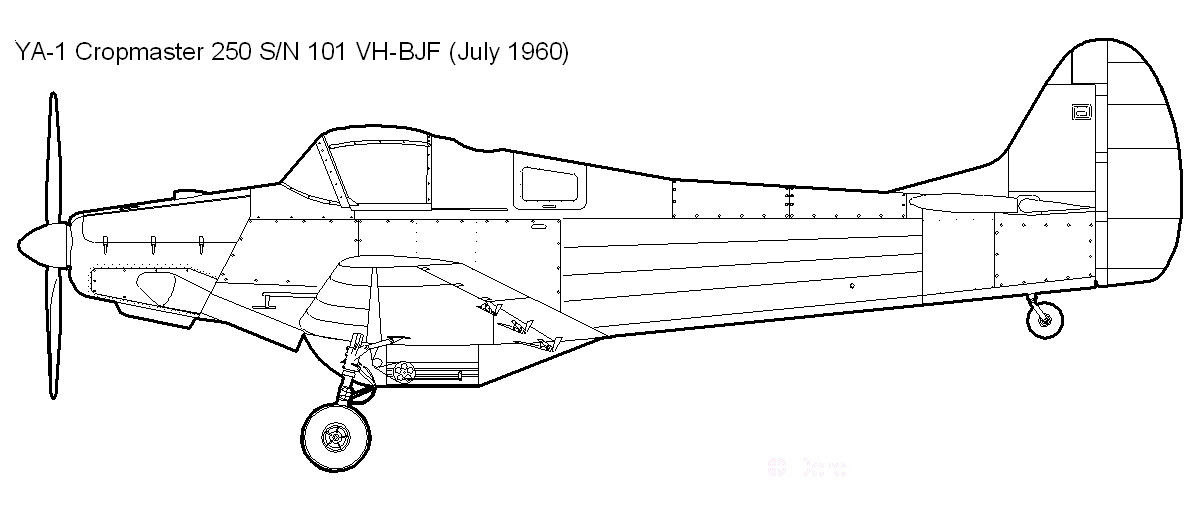
The first Cropmaster YA-1 conversions shared the wooden empennage and fabric-covered aft fuselage of the CA-6 Wackett

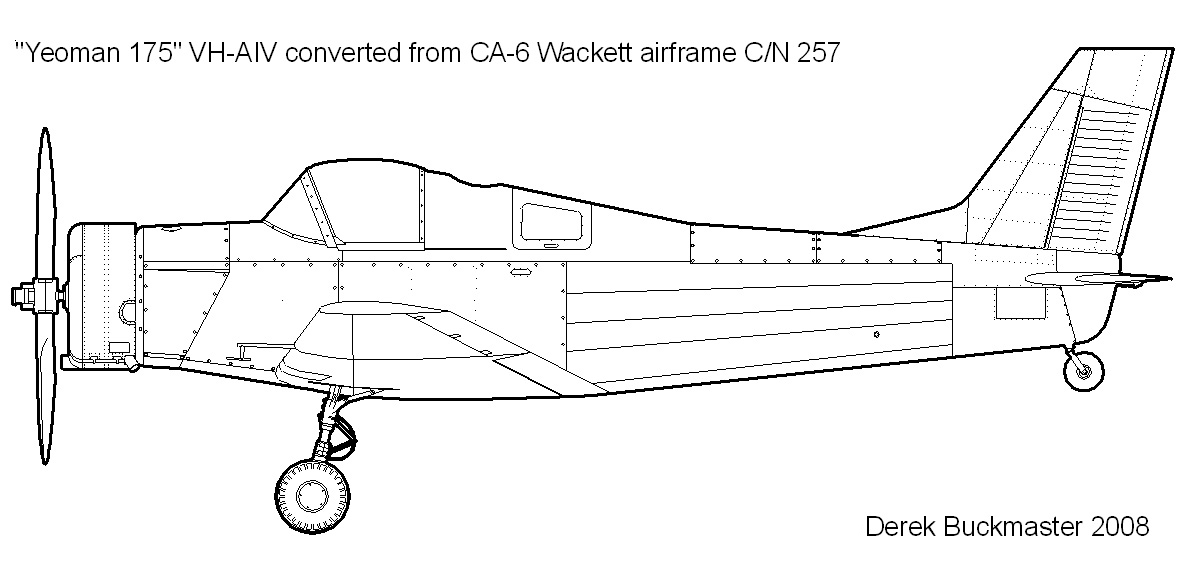
The Yeoman 175 was a one-off test-bed to check the characteristics of the new all-metal empennage

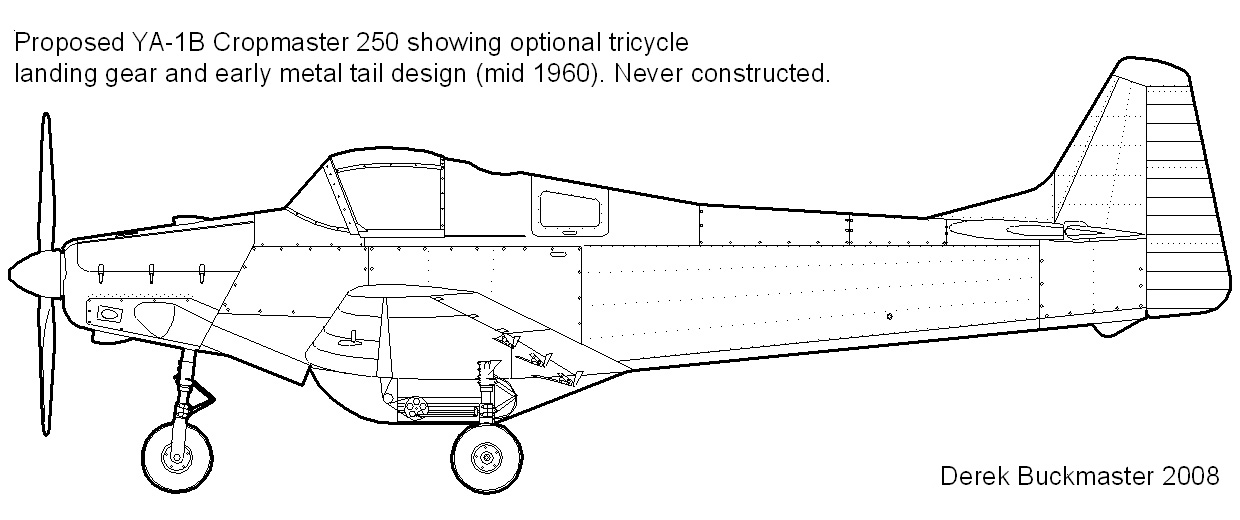
The proposed YA-1B Cropmaster featured a tricycle undercarriage, but was never produced

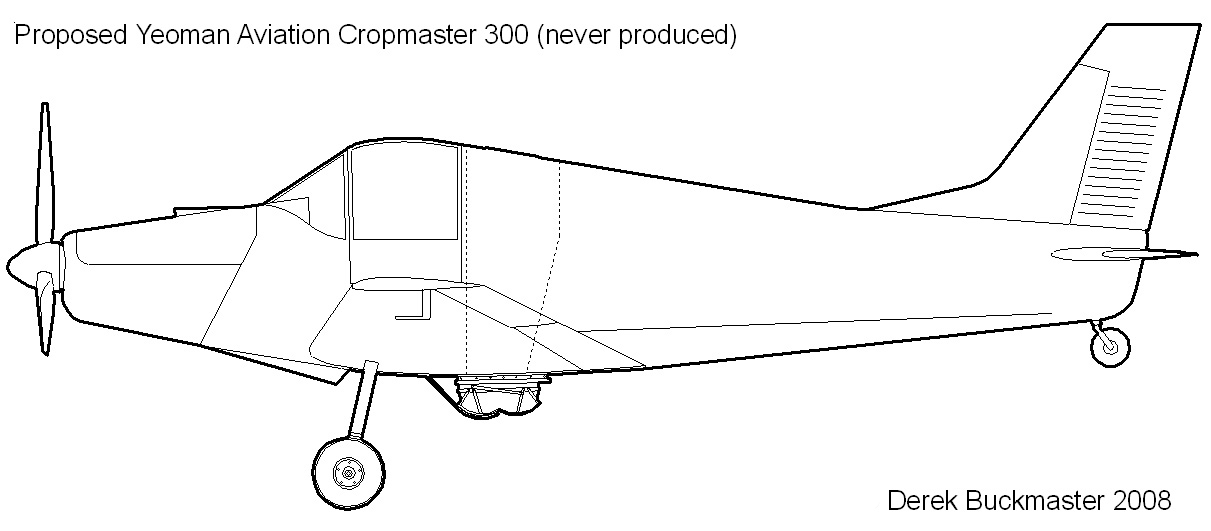
The proposed Cropmaster 300

By contrast the YA-1 Cropmaster involved major modifications to the Wackett airframe. The Wackett fuselage structure of steel tube was retained but had a 23 cubic ft. (650 litre) capacity hopper in lieu of the Wackett's rear cockpit and different external panels of metal and fibreglass (the Wackett fuselage was fabric covered); the Wackett's wooden wing was replaced by a new metal wing. The first five aircraft retained the Wackett's wooden tail, but subsequent aircraft had a metal tail that featured a stabilator, a swept-back fin and larger rudder. The Wackett's fixed tailwheel undercarriage was retained. The Warner Scarab radial engine of the Wackett was replaced by a horizontally-opposed engine, the YA-1 250 being fitted with a Lycoming O-540 engine of 250hp driving a Hartzell Propeller, while the YA-1 250R was fitted with a Continental IO-470 also developing 250 hp (190 kW), driving a Hartzell or McCauley propeller.

The first Cropmaster, a YA-1 250, took to the air for the first time on 15 January 1960. Twenty further aircraft were converted before production ceased in 1966, by which time the company was known as Cropmaster Aircraft. Like its contemporary the CAC Ceres the Cropmaster was unable to compete with more modern types of agricultural aircraft. Six of the twenty-one aircraft were the YA-1 250R model and the final three aircraft produced featured relocated main landing gear to counteract a tendency for the type to nose over on the ground. Six Cropmasters were exported to New Zealand with the last registered example being returned to Australia in April 2022. Two examples (one flying) are registered in Australia. The second is under rebuild at Wagga Wagga. Several other Cropmasters reportedly still exist in Australia and New Zealand.

== Variants ==
An intermediate flying test-bed, the single Yeoman 175 was converted from CA-6 Wackett airframe C/N 257 for trials of a new all-metal empennage, and had the swept fin of later Cropmasters but retained the Warner Scarab radial engine and fabric-covered aft fuselage of the Wackett.

A proposed variant with tricycle undercarriage was the YA-1B, none were built. A cut-away drawing of the YA-1B was included in a Yeoman Aviation brochure. The YA-1B design proposal also included an early version of the design for the all-metal empennage, with a more upright tail-fin than was actually produced. Another variant was the YA-1 285 with a 285 hp (213 kW) Continental engine, sources disagree as to whether any of this variant were produced.

At the time manufacture ceased, metal had been cut on the next evolution, this being the Cropmaster 300. The existing wing was to be retained with the span increased to 37 ft (11.28 m). The tail group was to remain unchanged. The tailwheel configuration was retained although new oleo legs to handle the heavier take-off weight were required. New plastic fuel tanks, still mounted between the front and rear wing spars, were of 21.5 imperial gallons capacity each, giving a total capacity of 43 gallons (195 lit.). Therefore, the practical working endurance remained at two hours or so. The fuselage was an all new design optimized for the topdressing role. The hopper remained in the same position but was of considerably increased capacity. Hopper load on topdressing would have varied between 12 and 17 cwt. (611/865 kg). The area from the hopper to the tail was to be of monocoque construction with an access hatch to permit loading of cargo/work equipment or (no doubt) the odd passenger. The cockpit section forward of the hopper was to be built on a steel tube frame and featured side by side seating for the pilot and a passenger (typically the landholder or the loader driver).

== Accidents ==
Four pilots were killed in Cropmasters. In 1961 at Deniliquin, Ralph Dennis ran a tank dry in Marshall's VH-MSS and spun in. In 1964 John Waddell pranged VH-BAQ near Boorowa while doing low level aerobatics. In 1965 Air-Culture's VH-CXQ, with Richard Adams flying, struck a tree whilst entering a spray run at Highbury near Narrogin. Also in 1965 Bill Pearson flying Bender's VH-RPB at Kempton went in from a hundred feet or so, just after lift-off. Non-fatal misadventures included wire strike, jammed elevators after fence strike, getting trapped in a blind gully, Hartzell propeller blade failures and nose-overs.

== Specifications (Yeoman YA-1 250R Cropmaster) ==
Data from Jane's All The World's Aircraft 1965–66

General characteristics

- Crew: 1
- Capacity: 23 ft^{3} (0.65 m^{3}) capacity hopper, 1,456 lb (660 kg) payload
- Length: 26 ft 4 in (8.03 m)
- Wingspan: 35 ft 0 in (10.67 m)
- Height: 9 ft 9 in (2.97 m)
- Wing area: 179 sq ft (16.6 m^{2})
- Empty weight: 1,800 lb (816 kg)
- Max takeoff weight: 3,530 lb (1,601 kg)
- Fuel capacity: 34 imp gal (41 US gal; 150 L)
- Powerplant: 1 × Continental IO-470-R six-cylinder air-cooled horizontally-opposed engine, 250 hp (190 kW)
- Propellers: 2-bladed McCauley constant-speed

Performance

- Maximum speed: 152 mph (245 km/h, 132 kn) at sea level
- Cruise speed: 129 mph (208 km/h, 112 kn) (econ cruise, 60% power)
- Stall speed: 53 mph (85 km/h, 46 kn)
- Never exceed speed: 240 mph (390 km/h, 210 kn)
- Endurance: 3 hr
- Rate of climb: 1,100 ft/min (5.6 m/s)
- Takeoff run to 50 ft (15 m): 1,200 ft (370 m)

== See also ==
Aircraft of comparable role, configuration, and era

- Auster Agricola
- Piper Pawnee
- Sasin Spraymaster
