= CAC Wackett =

Training airplane CAC

CAC Wackett Trainer (CA-2, CA-6)
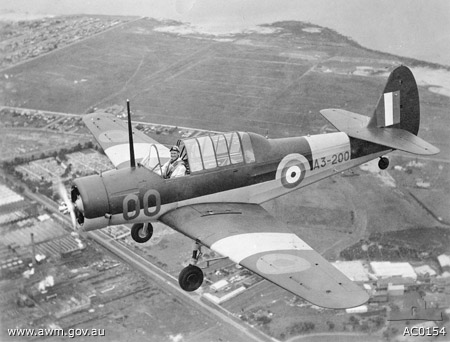

General information
- Type: Military trainer aircraft
- Manufacturer: Commonwealth Aircraft Corporation
- Designer: Lawrence Wackett
- Status: Retired
- Primary user: Royal Australian Air Force
- Number built: 202

History
- Introduction date: March 1941
- First flight: 19 September 1939
- Variants: Kingsford Smith Cropmaster; Yeoman Cropmaster

The CAC Wackett Trainer, or simply Wackett, was the first aircraft type designed in-house by the Commonwealth Aircraft Corporation of Australia. The name was derived from its designer Lawrence Wackett.

== Development ==
The type was designed to meet RAAF Specification 3/38 for an ab initio training aircraft. It was a tandem seat fixed tailwheel-undercarriage monoplane aircraft with a fuselage of steel tube and fabric construction and wings and tail made of wood. Despite the simplicity of the design, construction of the first of two CA-2 prototypes, begun in October 1938, was not completed until September 1939 (this was partly because CAC was still building its factory during this time period). The first prototype flew for the first time on 19 September 1939 fitted with a Gipsy Major series II engine, fitted with a metal DH variable pitch propeller. The aircraft proved to be underpowered with this engine so the second prototype was fitted with a Gipsy Six, removed from a Tugan Gannet, along with its wooden propeller, prior to its first flight in early November the same year (the first prototype was subsequently also re-engined with a Gypsy Six from a Tugan Gannet). Although in-flight performance was improved, the heavier engine negated any benefits to take-off performance obtained from the increased power, so the decision was made to install a 165D Warner Scarab radial engine driving a Hamilton Standard 2B20 two-bladed propeller. The two prototypes were fitted with Scarabs in mid-1940.

Several months passed before the RAAF committed to the type, partly because for a time it appeared that the organisation's training needs could be met with other types already being procured. However, RAAF Specification 1/40 for the "Supply of [the] CAC Wackett..." was eventually issued in August 1940 and the Wackett Trainer entered production. The first CA-6 production Wackett Trainer recorded its first flight on 6 February 1941 and entered service in March that year. Supplies of Hamilton Standard 2B20 propellers, which were being manufactured locally by de Havilland Australia, and the Scarab engines, were erratic during the first half of 1941. The propeller supply problem was not fully resolved until October of that year, so many unflyable aircraft accumulated at the CAC factory at Fishermans Bend. However, during this time the opportunity was taken to incorporate modifications to the thickness of the lower wing skins that in-service use had shown were required. Following the outbreak of the Pacific War production was increased to make way for the Boomerang and the last Wackett was delivered to the Royal Australian Air Force on 22 April 1942.

In the 1950s several aircraft were converted by Kingsford Smith Aviation Services Pty. Ltd. as agricultural aircraft, being renamed the KS-2 or KS-3 Cropmaster. The KS-2 had a hopper installed in the front cockpit; the single conversion was not a success so it was re-modified as the KS-3 with the hopper located in the rear cockpit. Four more Wacketts were converted to KS-3s and the type was further developed as the Yeoman Cropmaster.

== Operational history ==
Initially designed pre-war as an intended basic trainer to lead into the more advanced Wirraway trainer, the Wackett saw early service for evaluation in that role with the Royal Victorian Aero Club at Essendon, resulting in the brief formation of 3 Elementary Flying Training School (3 EFTS) before its relocation and reformation as 11 EFTS at Benalla, Victoria, but the local production and standardisation of basic training under the Empire Air Training Scheme (EATS) on the simpler and cheaper de Havilland Tiger Moth saw the Wackett largely superseded in that flying training role. The Wackett Trainer went on to serve in an important but largely forgotten role as wireless operator trainers with No. 1 Wireless Air Gunnery School (WAGS) at Ballarat, Victoria, No. 2 WAGS at Parkes, New South Wales and No. 3 WAGS at Maryborough, Queensland; and also as an initial dual flying trainer with 1 Elementary Flying Training School in Adelaide, South Australia; 3 Elementary Flying Training School in Melbourne, Victoria; 11 Elementary Flying Training School at Benalla, Victoria; and No. 5 Operational Training Unit at Tocumwal, New South Wales. It also served at several other Empire Air Training Scheme establishments in Australia. About one-third of the 200 aircraft were written-off during the type's service with the RAAF. After the end of World War II the remaining aircraft were withdrawn from use and sold to civilian individuals and organisations. Several dozen were placed on the Australian civil register. Several Wackett Trainers and a KS-3 Cropmaster are in museums and in private hands in Australia.

About thirty aircraft were subsequently re-sold to the Netherlands East Indies Air Force and the survivors of these were transferred to the nascent Indonesian Air Force at independence, although it is thought that they did not see further use.

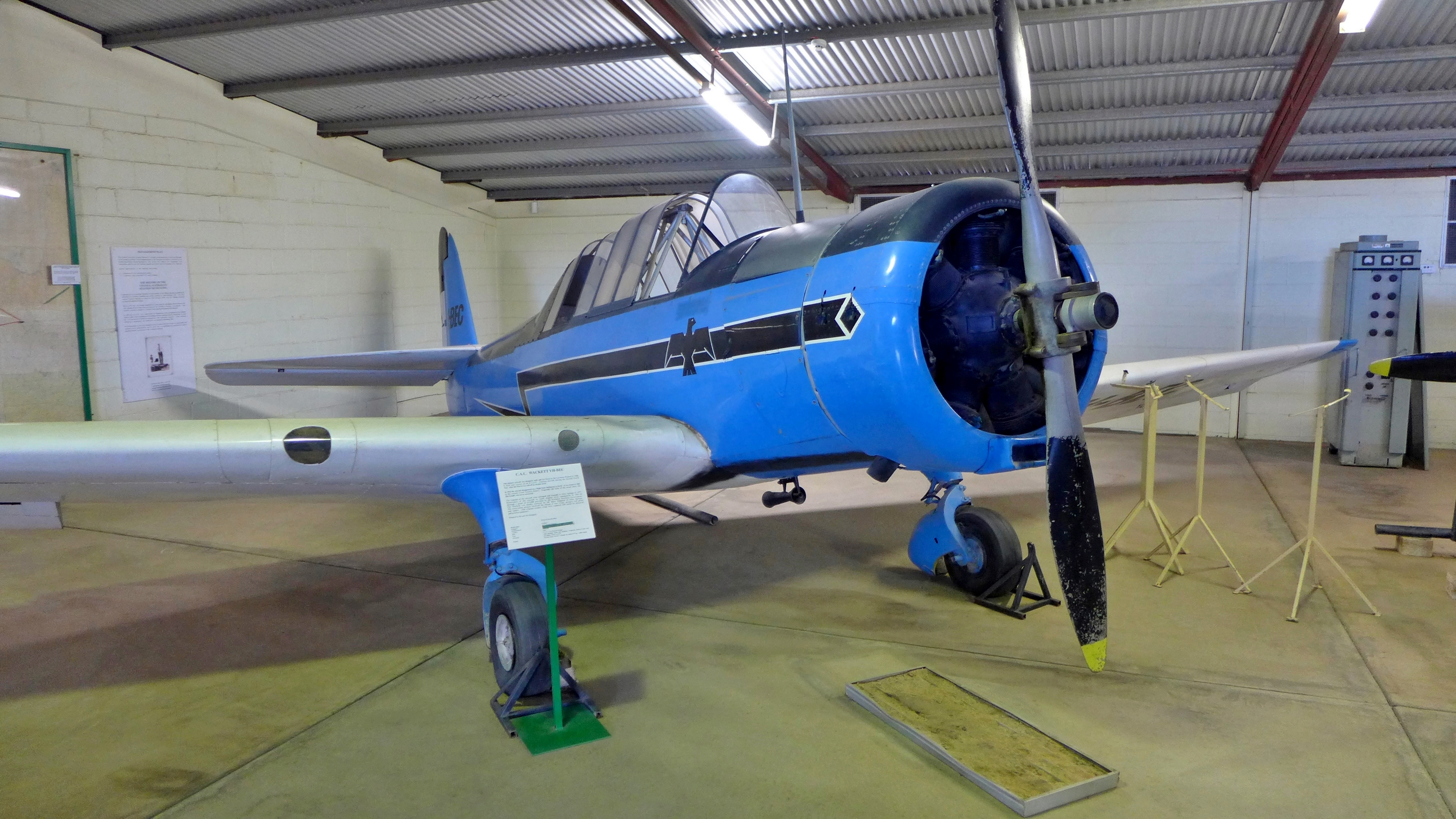
VH-BEC on display at the Central Australian Aviation Museum, 2015

=== Death of James Knight ===
On 14 January 1962 James Knight commenced a flight from Ceduna to Cook, South Australia (c.220 miles WNW) in Wackett VH-BEC (ex-RAAF A3-139). The aircraft never arrived at its destination and a 19-day search found no trace of it. Over three years later, on 28 March 1965, VH-BEC was sighted by the crew of an aerial survey aircraft, between sand dunes two hundred miles north of Cook. An expedition from Emu Field reached the aircraft on 6 April. Knight had inscribed a diary and his Last Will and Testament on the fuselage panels. Immediately after the forced landing in the desert due to fuel exhaustion Knight had compared the indications of the magnetic compasses in the front and rear cockpits, and discovered that the two compasses differed by about 30 degrees. Knight's last diary entry was made on 20 January 1962; he had remained with the aircraft for 6 days then walked away to find help, but his remains were never found. It was subsequently determined that the mount of the magnetic compass in the front cockpit was loose and the pilot saw headings that were about 30 degrees in error. VH-BEC was recovered in 1973 and is now on display at the Central Australian Aviation Museum at Alice Springs.

== Variants ==
- CA-2 Wackett Trainer : Prototypes. Two aircraft were built.
- CA-6 Wackett Trainer : Two-seat basic trainer aircraft for the RAAF. 200 aircraft were built.

== Operators ==
Australia

- Royal Australian Air Force

Netherlands East Indies

- Royal Netherlands East Indies Army Air Force (30 ex-RAAF aircraft)

Indonesia

- Indonesian Air Force

== Surviving aircraft ==
- A3-22 / (former VH-ALV) – CA-6 under restoration for static display at the Australian National Aviation Museum in Melbourne. This airframe is the 22nd production and oldest surviving Wackett Trainer.
- A3-31 / (former VH-AIY) – CA-6 (formerly owned by Horrie Miller) on static display at the Aviation Heritage Museum in Bull Creek, Western Australia.
- A3-49 / (former VH-AJH) – CA-6 modified to KS-3 Cropmaster (Kingsford Smith Air Services) static display at the Queensland Air Museum in Caloundra, Queensland.
- A3-56 / (no civil use) - – CA-6 stored for future static fuselage restoration at Lara, Victoria.
- A3-85 / (former VH-BLV) Currently registered as VH-LYW – CA-6 under longterm airworthy restoration at Lara, Victoria.
- A3-87 / (former VH-AJY) – CA-6 under restoration at the Maryborough Military Aviation Museum of Maryborough, Queensland.
- A3-129 / (former VH-AKJ, VH-AMA, VH-DGR) Currently registered as VH-WKT – CA-6 under longterm airworthy restoration with John Gallagher at Wedderburn, New South Wales.
- A3-137 / (no civil use) – CA-6 stored for future static cockpit restoration at Lara, Victoria.
- A3-139 / (former VH-BEC) - CA-6 on display "as found in the desert", at the Central Australian Aviation Museum, in Alice Springs, Northern Territory.
- A3-167 / (former VH-AGP) – Currently registered as VH-LNW – CA-6 under longterm airworthy restoration at Lara, Victoria.

== Specifications ==
Data from Holmes, 2005. p. 135

General characteristics

- Crew: 2
- Length: 7.92 m (26 ft 0 in)
- Wingspan: 11.28 m (37 ft 0 in)
- Height: 3.0 m (9 ft 10 in)
- Empty weight: 866 kg (1,910 lb)
- Gross weight: 1,175 kg (2,590 lb)
- Powerplant: 1 × Warner Scarab , 130 kW (175 hp)

Performance

- Maximum speed: 185 km/h (115 mph, 100 kn)
- Range: 684 km (425 mi, 369 nmi)

== See also ==
- List of aircraft of the RAAF
