= Lotus Mark III =

Single-seater sports car

Lotus Mark III was a single-seater sports car built by Colin Chapman as a 750 Racer. It was the first car to ever be called a "Lotus".

== History ==
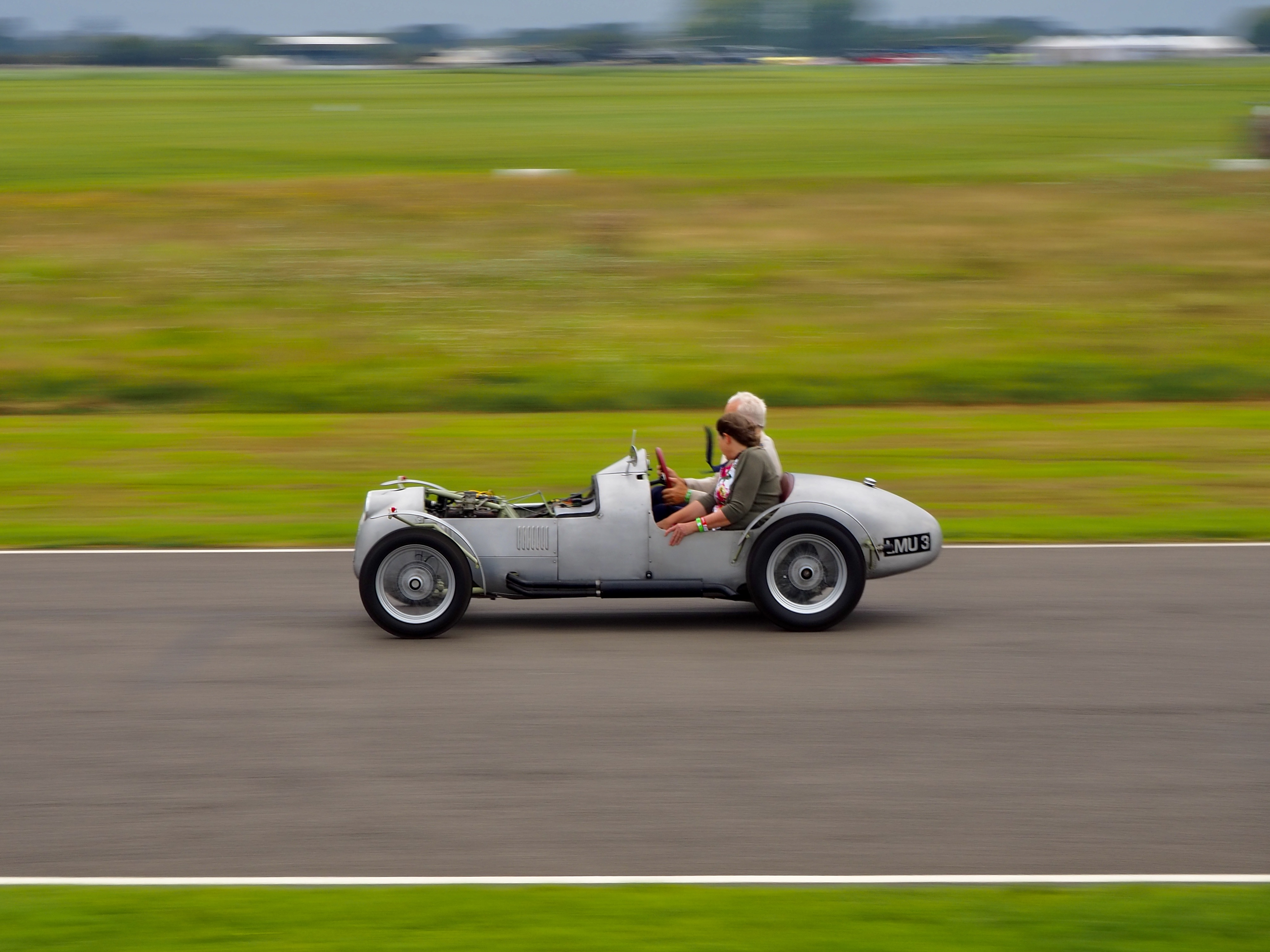
Lotus Mk III, Goodwood Members' Meeting 2023

In 1951, Chapman began to focus on a car for road racing, rather than trials, to compete in the 750 Motor Club formula, which used the Austin 7 as a basis. To conform to the rules, Chapman had to retain the Seven's chassis, engine, gearbox, and differential. With the assistance of Nigel and Michael Allen, he modified the car to the limits of the rules. Chapman boxed the frame rails and added 14-gauge tubular cross-members for torsional stiffness. A sleek aluminium two-seater body, which weighed only 65 lbs. (29.5 kg), was added to cut down drag, and the engine was extensively modified to produce more power. The car, for all its seeming delicacy, proved startlingly faster than the competition. It led to a demand for copies (an improved Mark IIIB (registered as ONK 408) was built for Adam Currie, for instance, was the first Lotus to be sold to a customer and the first car to wear the Lotus badge), as well as copies of the earlier Mark I. By the end of the racing season, it was apparent the Mark III was the best 750 Formula car in England.

The Mark III could reach 50 mph in 6.6 seconds and had a top speed of 90 mph.

At this time, Chapman was still working full-time at British Aluminium, and creating cars at nights and racing them, with the help of enthusiastic volunteers, on the weekends, but it was clear from the performance of the Mark III, and the demand, there was an opportunity here. Following this successful year, on 1 January 1952, Chapman established Lotus Engineering Company, with Michael Allen becoming Chapman's first business partner. They set up shop in a disused stable in Hornsey.
