= Jean-Denis Delétraz =

Swiss racing driver (born 1963)

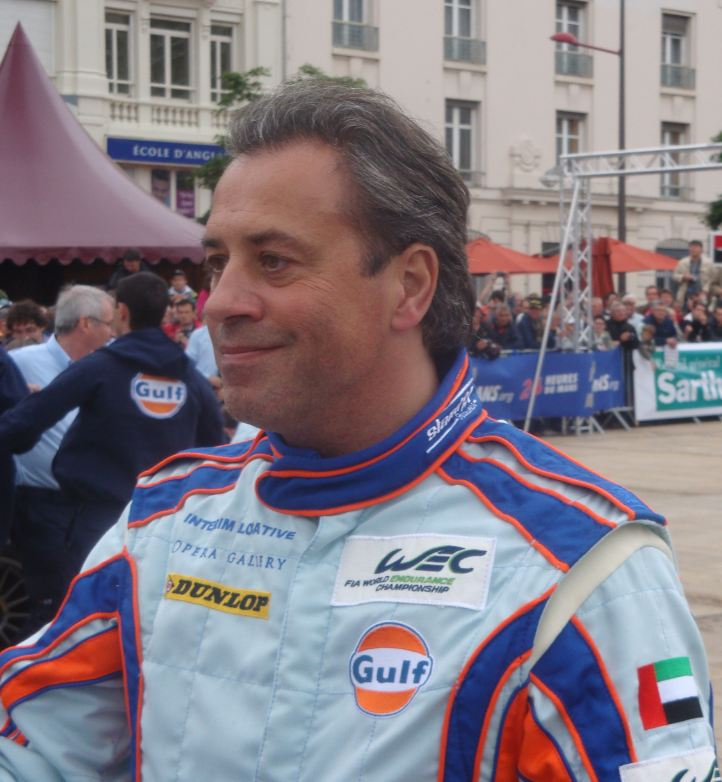
- Delétraz in 2012
- Born: 1 October 1963 (age 63) Geneva, Switzerland
- Relatives: Louis Delétraz (son)
- Categorisation: FIA Gold (until 2012); FIA Silver (2013–2017); FIA Bronze (2018–)

Formula One World Championship career
- Nationality: (Switzerland) Swiss
- Active years: 1994–1995
- Team(s): Larrousse, Pacific
- Entries: 3
- Championships: 0
- Wins: 0
- Podiums: 0
- Career points: 0
- Pole positions: 0
- Fastest laps: 0
- First entry: 1994 Australian Grand Prix
- Last entry: 1995 European Grand Prix

Jean-Denis Delétraz (born 1 October 1963) is a Swiss racing driver. He participated in three Formula One Grands Prix, debuting in the 1994 Australian Grand Prix. Before reaching Formula One, he scored two third places in the 1988 Formula 3000 season, but principally earned his three Formula One drives as a pay driver. After Formula One, he competed in sports car racing, with two class wins at the 24 Hours of Le Mans.

== Career ==
=== Pre-Formula One ===
Delétraz had some success in his early career, including two wins in Formula Ford cars. He went on to compete in Formula Three between 1985 and 1987 in the French championship, finishing 14th in the final standings in 1987. Between 1988 and 1991, he competed in Formula 3000 and during 1990 he bought the FIRST Racing team, but was never able to match the success of 1988 and scored no points. During 1991, the team was impounded by an Italian court for a time after legal action from the team's other driver, Giovanni Bonanno.

In 1992 and 1993, Deletraz competed in the French Touring Car Championship and the Porsche Supercup with little success. In 1994, Delétraz was signed as a driver for the SEAT works team in the French Touring Car Championship. His best result was fifth place in the race at Nogaro and he finished 13th overall in the standings.

=== Formula One ===
==== 1994: Larrousse ====
Towards the end of 1994, Larrousse was, like a number of other teams at the time, running short of money and needed pay drivers to keep the team afloat. Larrousse's number 19 car, which had started the year being driven by Olivier Beretta, was now being driven by drivers who could bring sponsorship money to the team. For the final race of the year in Australia, Larrousse let the aero-car inexperienced, physically unfit Delétraz replace Érik Comas in the team's second car for more sponsorship money in order to aid their financial situation.

During qualifying, Delétraz qualified in 25th position, ahead of Simtek's Domenico Schiattarella. However, Schiattarella overtook him during the first lap of the Grand Prix, and Delétraz gradually dropped back from the rest of the field. He retired on lap 57 with gearbox failure, after he had already been lapped ten times. He was lapping the circuit six seconds slower than the leaders, two seconds slower than his teammate Hideki Noda and 1–2 seconds slower than the next slowest driver Schiattarella. He was described by BBC commentator Jonathan Palmer as "having no business in Formula One."

Yes Delétraz, really, here having no business in Formula One. And demonstrating it there: he's spending all of his modest effort, frankly, keeping the car on the road. He's holding up Gerhard Berger there, who has now lost a second on Nigel Mansell, in the Larrousse. This is, I'm afraid, one of the problems of the Grand Prix season - at the end of the year we do get one or two drives being taken by people who've got more money than talent, and that's one example of it.

— Jonathan Palmer, BBC broadcast of the 1994 Australian Grand Prix - transcript of recording from F1 Rejects

==== 1995: Pacific ====
Pacific Team Lotus started with shareholder Bertrand Gachot and Andrea Montermini as its drivers, but similar to Larrousse the previous year, the team needed pay drivers to continue the season and Gachot vacated his seat. It was announced that Delétraz would be competing in the final five races of the season.

"I am very happy to be returning to Formula One and we will work hard together to make this a competitive end to the season. Although the Pacific team is quite small, they have a lot of motivation and I think everyone knows that Keith Wiggins is determined to make strong progress in Formula One. For me it is a good opportunity to gain more Formula One experience, and to develop a programme which hopefully will lead to my participation in the 1996 Formula One World Championship."

— Délétraz, on signing with Pacific for the remainder of the season.

During qualifying for his first round of the year, in Portugal, Delétraz was hindered by a gearbox problem which saw him qualify last, twelve seconds behind pole-position sitter David Coulthard. In the race, Delétraz was 40 seconds behind Coulthard after three laps, and was lapping the circuit 12 seconds slower than the leaders and 6–7 seconds than the next slowest driver Roberto Moreno in a Forti and 7–8 seconds slower than his team-mate Montermini. He was lapped by the leaders after seven laps of the race, and after fourteen he retired from the race with cramp in his left arm. This drew criticism as Estoril is a clockwise circuit, which requires more work from the right arm. In his second race at the Nürburgring, he qualified just over nine seconds behind pole-position, and he finished the race in fifteenth place as the last finisher, seven laps behind the winner.

At the next race, Delétraz was replaced by Bertrand Gachot after planned replacements were denied superlicenses. It had been expected that Delétraz would be competing until the end of the season, but he defaulted on payment and Keith Wiggins, principal of the Pacific team stated, "On ability alone, we are not willing to keep him."

The slow qualifying speeds of drivers like Delétraz resulted in the introduction of the 107% rule for the 1996 season - with some F1 fans nicknaming the new regulation the "Delétraz rule" as a result.

=== Sports Car Racing ===
24 Hours of Le Mans career
- Years: 1995 – 1996, 2000 – 2002, 2004, 2007, 2012
- Teams: Giroix Racing Team; Kokusai Kaihatsu Racing; Racing Organisation Course; Noël del Bello Racing; Barron Connor Racing; Swiss Spirit
- Best finish: 5th (1995, 2001)
- Class wins: 2 (2001, 2002)

After his tenure in Formula One, Delétraz focused on endurance racing, running in the 24 Hours of LeMans and the BPR Global GT Series in 1995. 1996 saw Delétraz move to the FIRST Racing operation he now co-owned with fellow driver Fabien Giroix. Two years in the BPR Global GT Series in a McLaren F1 GTR was followed by a move to the FIA GT Championship in 1997, with FIRST running the works Lotus Elise GT1s. After a couple of years away, FIRST and Delétraz returned to the FIA Championship in 2000 with a Ferrari 550 Maranello.

In 2001, Delétraz won the LMP675 class at the 24 Hours of Le Mans, profiting from all but one competitor retiring prematurely. In 2002, Delétraz returned to the FIA GT Championship on a full-time basis, partnering Andrea Piccini at BMS Scuderia Italia. Driving a Ferrari 550, the pair took four wins and finished fifth in the championship. In addition, Delétraz defended his LMP675 class victory at Le Mans — profiting from a final lap suspension failure for the leading Welter-Peugeot. Delétraz and Piccini drove a works Lister Storm in the 2003 FIA GT Championship, scoring two podiums before withdrawing from the championship at the halfway mark. Delétraz returned to the series at the back end of 2004, though his DAMS entry retired from three of the four races. In 2005, Delétraz scored a best result of fourth and finished 15th in the standings. Going into 2006, he partnered Piccini at Phoenix Racing, piloting a Aston Martin DBR9. Having scored podiums at Brno, Oschersleben, the Spa 24 Hours, and Dijon, the duo capped off their campaign by winning the season-ending Dubai 500km. These results left them second in the standings.

Ahead of the 2007 season, Delétraz remained at Phoenix, which switched to the Chevrolet Corvette C6.R. He and Mike Hezemans finished fourth overall with four podiums, the highlights being overall victory at the Spa 24 Hours (alongside Marcel Fässler and Fabrizio Gollin) and a win at Nogaro. Heading into 2008, Delétraz was joined full-time by Marcel Fässler. The duo won both street races at Bucharest, in addition to scoring three further podiums.

Delétraz entered the maiden season of the FIA World Endurance Championship in 2012, driving a Lola B12/80 in the LMP2 class. His team, Gulf Racing Middle East, ended up seventh (second-to-last) in the standings.

== Personal life ==
Jean-Denis's son, Louis, is also a racing driver. As of 2026, he holds the record for the most championship titles in the European Le Mans Series.

== Racing record ==
=== Complete International Formula 3000 results ===
(key) (Races in bold indicate pole position) (Races in italics indicate fastest lap)

Year	Entrant	Chassis	Engine	1	2	3	4	5	6	7	8	9	10	11	Pos.	Pts
1988	Sport Auto Racing	Lola T88/50	Cosworth	JER; 9	VAL; DNQ	PAU; Ret	SIL; DNQ	MNZ; Ret	PER; DNQ	BRH	BIR; 10				13th	8
1988	GDBA Motorsport	Lola T88/50	Cosworth									BUG; 3	ZOL; 3	DIJ; Ret	13th	8
1989	First Racing	Leyton March 89B	Cosworth	SIL; 14	VAL; Ret	PAU; Ret									NC	0
1989	First Racing	Reynard 89D	Cosworth				JER; 15	PER; Ret	BRH; DSQ	BIR; 12	SPA; DNQ	BUG; Ret	DIJ; 9		NC	0
1990	First Racing	Reynard 90D	Cosworth	DON; 7	SIL; DNQ	PAU; Ret	JER; DNQ	MNZ; Ret	PER	HOC	BRH	BIR	BUG	NOG	NC	0
1991	First Racing	Reynard 91D	Cosworth	VAL; DNS	PAU; DNQ	JER; Ret	MUG	PER	HOC	BRH	SPA	BUG	NOG		NC	0

=== Complete World Sportscar Championship results ===
(key) (Races in bold indicate pole position) (Races in italics indicate fastest lap)

Year	Entrant	Class	Chassis	Engine	1	2	3	4	5	6	7	8	9	10	11	Pos.	Pts
1988	Swiss Team Salamin	C1	Porsche 962C	Porsche Type 935/79 2.8 F6t	JER	JAR	MNZ	SIL	LMS	BRN	BRH; 7	NÜR	SPA	FUJ	SAN	NC	0

=== Complete Formula One results ===
(key)

Year	Entrant	Chassis	Engine	1	2	3	4	5	6	7	8	9	10	11	12	13	14	15	16	17	WDC	Pts
1994	Tourtel Larrousse	Larrousse LH94	Ford HBF7/8 3.5 V8	BRA	PAC	SMR	MON	ESP	CAN	FRA	GBR	GER	HUN	BEL	ITA	POR	EUR	JPN	AUS; Ret		NC	0
1995	Pacific Team Lotus	Pacific PR02	Ford EDC 3.0 V8	BRA	ARG	SMR	ESP	MON	CAN	FRA	GBR	GER	HUN	BEL	ITA	POR; Ret	EUR; 15	PAC	JPN	AUS	NC	0

=== 24 Hours of Le Mans results ===
Year	Team	Co-Drivers	Car	Class	Laps	Pos.	Class Pos.
1995	(France) Giroix Racing Team	(France) Fabien Giroix (France) Olivier Grouillard	McLaren F1 GTR	GT1	290	5th	4th
1996	(United Kingdom) Kokusai Kaihatsu Racing (France) Giroix Racing Team	(France) Fabien Giroix (Brazil) Maurizio Sandro Sala	McLaren F1 GTR	GT1	146	DNF	DNF
1997	(United Kingdom) GT1 Lotus Racing	(France) Fabien Giroix (Thailand) Ratanakul Prutirat	Lotus Elise GT1-Chevrolet	GT1	-	DNQ	DNQ
2000	(France) Racing Organisation Course	(Germany) Ralf Kelleners (France) David Terrien	Reynard 2KQ-LM-Volkswagen	LMP675	44	DNF	DNF
2001	(France) ROC Auto	(Spain) Jordi Gené (France) Pascal Fabre	Reynard 2KQ-LM-Volkswagen	LMP675	284	5th	**1st**
2002	(France) Noël del Bello Racing (France) ROC Compétition	(Switzerland) Christophe Pillon (Austria) Walter Lechner, Jr.	Reynard 2KQ-LM-Volkswagen	LMP675	317	19th	**1st**
2004	(Netherlands) Barron Connor Racing	(Netherlands) Mike Hezemans (France) Ange Barde	Ferrari 575-GTC	GTS	200	DNF	DNF
2007	(Switzerland) Swiss Spirit	(Switzerland) Marcel Fässler (Switzerland) Iradj Alexander	Lola B07/18-Audi	LMP1	62	DNF	DNF
2012	(United Arab Emirates) Gulf Racing Middle East	(Japan) Keiko Ihara (France) Marc Rostan	Lola B12/80-Nissan	LMP2	17	DNF	DNF

=== Complete FIA GT Championship results ===
(key) (Races in bold indicate pole position) (Races in italics indicate fastest lap)

Year	Team	Car	Class	1	2	3	4	5	6	7	8	9	10	11	Pos.	Pts
1997	GT1 Lotus Racing	Lotus Elise GT1	GT1	HOC; Ret	SIL; Ret	HEL; 12	NÜR; Ret	SPA; 8	A1R; Ret	SUZ	DON; Ret	MUG	SEB; Ret	LAG; Ret	NC	0
1998	Zakspeed Racing	Porsche 911 GT1-98	GT1	OSC	SIL	HOC	DIJ	HUN	SUZ; 8	DON	A1R	HOM	LAG		NC	0
2000	First Racing	Ferrari 550 Maranello	GT	VAL; Ret	EST	MNZ; Ret	SIL	HUN	ZOL; Ret	A1R	LAU	BRN; Ret	MAG; Ret		NC	0
2002	BMS Scuderia Italia	Ferrari 550-GTS Maranello	GT	MAG; 6	SIL; Ret	**BRN**; Ret	**JAR**; 1	AND; 1	OSC; 1	**SPA**; Ret	PER; 10	DON; Ret	**EST**; 1		5th	41
2003	Lister Storm Racing	Lister Storm	GT	CAT; 4	MAG; 3	PER; 5	BRN; 2	DON; 9	SPA	AND	OSC	EST	MNZ		15th	23
2004	DAMS	Lamborghini Murciélago R-GT	GT	MNZ	VAL	MAG	HOC	BRN	DON	SPA	IMO; 14	OSC; Ret	DUB; Ret	ZHU; Ret	NC	0
2005	GPC Sport	Ferrari 575-GTC Maranello	GT1	MNZ; Ret	MAG; 9	SIL; 7	IMO; Ret	BRN; Ret	SPA; Ret	OSC; 6	**IST**; 4	ZHU; 5	DUB; 6	BHR; 12	15th	19
2006	Phoenix Racing	Aston Martin DBR9	GT1	SIL; 6	BRN; 2	OSC; 3	**SPA**; 2	PRI; 6	DIJ; 3	MUG; 6	HUN; 4	ADR; Ret	DUB; 1		2nd	62
2007	Phoenix Carsport Racing	Chevrolet Corvette C6.R	GT1	ZHU; 5	**SIL**; 2	BUC; Ret	MNZ; 3	OSC; Ret	**SPA**; 1	ADR; 5	BRN; 9	NOG; 1	ZOL; 4		4th	55
2008	Phoenix Carsport Racing	Chevrolet Corvette C6.R	GT1	**SIL**; 8	MNZ; Ret	**ADR**; 3	OSC; 3	SPA; 6	**BUC**; 1	BUC; 1	BRN; 4	**NOG**; 3	ZOL; 5	SAN	8th	45.5

=== Complete FIA World Endurance Championship results ===
(key) (Races in bold indicate pole position; races in italics indicate fastest lap)

Year	Entrant	Class	Car	Engine	1	2	3	4	5	6	7	8	Pos.	Pts
2012	Gulf Racing Middle East	LMP2	Lola B12/80	Nissan VK45DE 4.5 V8	SEB; EX	SPA; 18	LMS; Ret	SIL; 15	SÃO; 24	BHR; Ret	FUJ; 13	SHA; Ret	70th	2
