= 1997 FIA GT Zeltweg 4 Hours =

Layout of the A1-Ring (1996-2003)

The 1997 FIA GT Zeltweg 4 Hours was the sixth race of the 1997 FIA GT Championship season. It was run at the redesigned A1-Ring, Austria on August 3, 1997.

== Official results ==
Class winners in bold. Cars failing to complete 75% of winner's distance marked as Not Classified (NC).

Pos	Class	No	Team	Drivers	Chassis	Tyre	Laps
Pos	Class	No	Team	Drivers	Engine	Tyre	Laps
1	**GT1**	**12**	**(Germany) AMG-Mercedes**	**(Germany) Klaus Ludwig (Germany) Bernd Mayländer**	**Mercedes-Benz CLK GTR**	**B**	**161**
1	**GT1**	**12**	**(Germany) AMG-Mercedes**	**(Germany) Klaus Ludwig (Germany) Bernd Mayländer**	**Mercedes-Benz LS600 6.0L V12**	**B**	**161**
2	GT1	10	(Germany) AMG-Mercedes	(Germany) Marcel Tiemann (Italy) Alessandro Nannini	Mercedes-Benz CLK GTR	**B**	160
2	GT1	10	(Germany) AMG-Mercedes	(Germany) Marcel Tiemann (Italy) Alessandro Nannini	Mercedes-Benz LS600 6.0L V12	**B**	160
3	GT1	8	(Germany) BMW Motorsport (Germany) Schnitzer Motorsport	(Finland) JJ Lehto (United Kingdom) Steve Soper	McLaren F1 GTR	**MI**	160
3	GT1	8	(Germany) BMW Motorsport (Germany) Schnitzer Motorsport	(Finland) JJ Lehto (United Kingdom) Steve Soper	BMW S70 6.0L V12	**MI**	160
4	GT1	11	(Germany) AMG-Mercedes	(Germany) Bernd Schneider (Austria) Alexander Wurz	Mercedes-Benz CLK GTR	**B**	159
4	GT1	11	(Germany) AMG-Mercedes	(Germany) Bernd Schneider (Austria) Alexander Wurz	Mercedes-Benz LS600 6.0L V12	**B**	159
5	GT1	3	(United Kingdom) Gulf Team Davidoff (United Kingdom) GTC Racing	(Sweden) Anders Olofsson (France) Pierre-Henri Raphanel	McLaren F1 GTR	**MI**	159
5	GT1	3	(United Kingdom) Gulf Team Davidoff (United Kingdom) GTC Racing	(Sweden) Anders Olofsson (France) Pierre-Henri Raphanel	BMW S70 6.0L V12	**MI**	159
6	GT1	6	(Germany) Porsche AG	(France) Bob Wollek (Belgium) Thierry Boutsen	Porsche 911 GT1 Evo	**MI**	159
6	GT1	6	(Germany) Porsche AG	(France) Bob Wollek (Belgium) Thierry Boutsen	Porsche 3.2L Turbo Flat-6	**MI**	159
7	GT1	7	(Germany) Porsche AG	(United Kingdom) Allan McNish (France) Yannick Dalmas	Porsche 911 GT1 Evo	**MI**	158
7	GT1	7	(Germany) Porsche AG	(United Kingdom) Allan McNish (France) Yannick Dalmas	Porsche 3.2L Turbo Flat-6	**MI**	158
8	GT1	22	(Italy) BMS Scuderia Italia	(Italy) Christian Pescatori (Italy) Pierluigi Martini	Porsche 911 GT1	**P**	156
8	GT1	22	(Italy) BMS Scuderia Italia	(Italy) Christian Pescatori (Italy) Pierluigi Martini	Porsche 3.2L Turbo Flat-6	**P**	156
9	GT1	20	(France) DAMS Panoz	(France) Éric Bernard (France) Franck Lagorce	Panoz Esperante GTR-1	**MI**	156
9	GT1	20	(France) DAMS Panoz	(France) Éric Bernard (France) Franck Lagorce	Ford (Roush) 6.0L V8	**MI**	156
10	GT1	17	(France) JB Racing	(Italy) Mauro Baldi (France) Emmanuel Collard	Porsche 911 GT1	**MI**	155
10	GT1	17	(France) JB Racing	(Italy) Mauro Baldi (France) Emmanuel Collard	Porsche 3.2L Turbo Flat-6	**MI**	155
11	GT1	5	(United Kingdom) David Price Racing	(Australia) David Brabham (United Kingdom) Perry McCarthy	Panoz Esperante GTR-1	**G**	154
11	GT1	5	(United Kingdom) David Price Racing	(Australia) David Brabham (United Kingdom) Perry McCarthy	Ford (Roush) 6.0L V8	**G**	154
12	GT1	4	(United Kingdom) David Price Racing	(United Kingdom) Andy Wallace (United Kingdom) James Weaver	Panoz Esperante GTR-1	**G**	150
12	GT1	4	(United Kingdom) David Price Racing	(United Kingdom) Andy Wallace (United Kingdom) James Weaver	Ford (Roush) 6.0L V8	**G**	150
13	**GT2**	**57**	**(Germany) Roock Racing**	**(France) Stéphane Ortelli (Germany) Claudia Hürtgen (Switzerland) Bruno Eichmann**	**Porsche 911 GT2**	**MI**	**148**
13	**GT2**	**57**	**(Germany) Roock Racing**	**(France) Stéphane Ortelli (Germany) Claudia Hürtgen (Switzerland) Bruno Eichmann**	**Porsche 3.6L Turbo Flat-6**	**MI**	**148**
14	GT2	51	(France) Viper Team Oreca	(Monaco) Olivier Beretta (France) Philippe Gache	Chrysler Viper GTS-R	**MI**	147
14	GT2	51	(France) Viper Team Oreca	(Monaco) Olivier Beretta (France) Philippe Gache	Chrysler 8.0L V10	**MI**	147
15	GT2	52	(France) Viper Team Oreca	(United Kingdom) Justin Bell (Austria) Dieter Quester	Chrysler Viper GTS-R	**MI**	146
15	GT2	52	(France) Viper Team Oreca	(United Kingdom) Justin Bell (Austria) Dieter Quester	Chrysler 8.0L V10	**MI**	146
16	GT2	63	(Germany) Krauss Motorsport	(Germany) Michael Trunk (Germany) Bernhard Müller	Porsche 911 GT2	**P**	145
16	GT2	63	(Germany) Krauss Motorsport	(Germany) Michael Trunk (Germany) Bernhard Müller	Porsche 3.6L Turbo Flat-6	**P**	145
17	GT2	55	(Austria) Augustin Motorsport	(Austria) Manfred Jurasz (Germany) Helmut Reis (Germany) Wido Rössler	Porsche 911 GT2	**G**	143
17	GT2	55	(Austria) Augustin Motorsport	(Austria) Manfred Jurasz (Germany) Helmut Reis (Germany) Wido Rössler	Porsche 3.6L Turbo Flat-6	**G**	143
18	GT2	64	(Germany) Kremer Racing	(Spain) Tomas Saldaña (Spain) Alfonso de Orleans (France) Christophe Bouchut	Porsche 911 GT2	**G**	139
18	GT2	64	(Germany) Kremer Racing	(Spain) Tomas Saldaña (Spain) Alfonso de Orleans (France) Christophe Bouchut	Porsche 3.6L Turbo Flat-6	**G**	139
19	GT2	70	(Germany) Dellenbach Motorsport	(Germany) Güther Blieninger (Germany) Rainer Bonnetsmüller (Germany) Klaus Horn	Porsche 911 GT2	**D**	137
19	GT2	70	(Germany) Dellenbach Motorsport	(Germany) Güther Blieninger (Germany) Rainer Bonnetsmüller (Germany) Klaus Horn	Porsche 3.6L Turbo Flat-6	**D**	137
20	GT1	16	(Germany) Roock Racing	(Germany) Ralf Kelleners (Portugal) Pedro Chaves	Porsche 911 GT1	**MI**	133
20	GT1	16	(Germany) Roock Racing	(Germany) Ralf Kelleners (Portugal) Pedro Chaves	Porsche 3.2L Turbo Flat-6	**MI**	133
21	GT2	59	(Netherlands) Marcos Racing International	(Netherlands) Cor Euser (Germany) Harald Becker	Marcos LM600	**D**	130
21	GT2	59	(Netherlands) Marcos Racing International	(Netherlands) Cor Euser (Germany) Harald Becker	Chevrolet 5.9L V8	**D**	130
22	GT2	69	(Germany) Proton Motorsport	(Germany) Gerold Ried (France) Patrick Vuillaume	Porsche 911 GT2	**P**	122
22	GT2	69	(Germany) Proton Motorsport	(Germany) Gerold Ried (France) Patrick Vuillaume	Porsche 3.6L Turbo Flat-6	**P**	122
23 DNF	GT1	2	(United Kingdom) Gulf Team Davidoff (United Kingdom) GTC Racing	(Denmark) John Nielsen (Germany) Thomas Bscher	McLaren F1 GTR	**MI**	107
23 DNF	GT1	2	(United Kingdom) Gulf Team Davidoff (United Kingdom) GTC Racing	(Denmark) John Nielsen (Germany) Thomas Bscher	BMW S70 6.0L V12	**MI**	107
24 DNF	GT2	56	(Germany) Roock Racing	(Switzerland) Bruno Eichmann (Portugal) Ni Amorim	Porsche 911 GT2	**MI**	101
24 DNF	GT2	56	(Germany) Roock Racing	(Switzerland) Bruno Eichmann (Portugal) Ni Amorim	Porsche 3.6L Turbo Flat-6	**MI**	101
25 DNF	GT2	53	(United Kingdom) Chamberlain Engineering	(Germany) Gerd Ruch (Italy) Almo Coppelli (Italy) Leonardo Maddalena	Chrysler Viper GTS-R	**G**	84
25 DNF	GT2	53	(United Kingdom) Chamberlain Engineering	(Germany) Gerd Ruch (Italy) Almo Coppelli (Italy) Leonardo Maddalena	Chrysler 8.0L V10	**G**	84
26 DNF	GT2	66	(Germany) Konrad Motorsport	(Austria) Franz Konrad (Switzerland) Toni Seiler	Porsche 911 GT2	**P**	72
26 DNF	GT2	66	(Germany) Konrad Motorsport	(Austria) Franz Konrad (Switzerland) Toni Seiler	Porsche 3.6L Turbo Flat-6	**P**	72
27 DNF	GT1	24	(United Kingdom) GBF UK Ltd.	(Italy) Andrea Boldrini (Austria) Ralf Kalaschek	Lotus Elise GT1	**MI**	70
27 DNF	GT1	24	(United Kingdom) GBF UK Ltd.	(Italy) Andrea Boldrini (Austria) Ralf Kalaschek	Lotus 3.5L Turbo V8	**MI**	70
28 DNF	GT1	31	(Austria) Augustin Motorsport	(Austria) Horst Felbermayr Sr. (Austria) Horst Felbermayr Jr. (Italy) Stefano Buttiero	Porsche 911 GT2 Evo	**G**	68
28 DNF	GT1	31	(Austria) Augustin Motorsport	(Austria) Horst Felbermayr Sr. (Austria) Horst Felbermayr Jr. (Italy) Stefano Buttiero	Porsche 3.6L Turbo Flat-6	**G**	68
29 DNF	GT2	65	(Germany) RWS	(Italy) Luca Riccitelli (Italy) Raffaele Sangiuolo (Germany) Benno Rottenfusser	Porsche 911 GT2	?	60
29 DNF	GT2	65	(Germany) RWS	(Italy) Luca Riccitelli (Italy) Raffaele Sangiuolo (Germany) Benno Rottenfusser	Porsche 3.6L Turbo Flat-6	?	60
30 DNF	GT1	1	(United Kingdom) Gulf Team Davidoff (United Kingdom) GTC Racing	(United Kingdom) Andrew Gilbert-Scott (United Kingdom) Geoff Lees	McLaren F1 GTR	**MI**	44
30 DNF	GT1	1	(United Kingdom) Gulf Team Davidoff (United Kingdom) GTC Racing	(United Kingdom) Andrew Gilbert-Scott (United Kingdom) Geoff Lees	BMW S70 6.0L V12	**MI**	44
31 DNF	GT1	9	(Germany) BMW Motorsport (Germany) Schnitzer Motorsport	(Netherlands) Peter Kox (Italy) Roberto Ravaglia	McLaren F1 GTR	**MI**	39
31 DNF	GT1	9	(Germany) BMW Motorsport (Germany) Schnitzer Motorsport	(Netherlands) Peter Kox (Italy) Roberto Ravaglia	BMW S70 6.0L V12	**MI**	39
32 DNF	GT1	19	(Germany) Martin Veyhle Racing (MVR)	(Germany) Alexander Grau (Denmark) Kurt Thiim	Lotus Elise GT1	?	39
32 DNF	GT1	19	(Germany) Martin Veyhle Racing (MVR)	(Germany) Alexander Grau (Denmark) Kurt Thiim	Lotus 3.5L Turbo V8	?	39
33 DNF	GT1	13	(United Kingdom) GT1 Lotus Racing Franck Muller	(France) Fabien Giroix (Switzerland) Jean-Denis Délétraz	Lotus Elise GT1	**P**	33
33 DNF	GT1	13	(United Kingdom) GT1 Lotus Racing Franck Muller	(France) Fabien Giroix (Switzerland) Jean-Denis Délétraz	Chevrolet LT5 6.0L V8	**P**	33
34 DNF	GT1	23	(United Kingdom) GBF UK Ltd.	(Italy) Luca Badoer (Italy) Mimmo Schiattarella	Lotus Elise GT1	**MI**	31
34 DNF	GT1	23	(United Kingdom) GBF UK Ltd.	(Italy) Luca Badoer (Italy) Mimmo Schiattarella	Lotus 3.5L Turbo V8	**MI**	31
35 DNF	GT1	14	(United Kingdom) GT1 Lotus Racing Franck Muller	(Netherlands) Jan Lammers (Netherlands) Mike Hezemans	Lotus Elise GT1	**P**	13
35 DNF	GT1	14	(United Kingdom) GT1 Lotus Racing Franck Muller	(Netherlands) Jan Lammers (Netherlands) Mike Hezemans	Chevrolet LT5 6.0L V8	**P**	13
36 DNF	GT1	27	(United Kingdom) Parabolica Motorsport	(United Kingdom) Gary Ayles (United Kingdom) Chris Goodwin	McLaren F1 GTR	**MI**	13
36 DNF	GT1	27	(United Kingdom) Parabolica Motorsport	(United Kingdom) Gary Ayles (United Kingdom) Chris Goodwin	BMW S70 6.0L V12	**MI**	13
DNQ	GT2	71	(Italy) GT Racing Team	(Italy) Luca Drudi (Italy) Luigino Pagotto	Porsche 911 GT2	?	–
DNQ	GT2	71	(Italy) GT Racing Team	(Italy) Luca Drudi (Italy) Luigino Pagotto	Porsche 3.6L Turbo Flat-6	?	–

== Statistics ==
- Pole Position – #10 AMG-Mercedes – 1:22.990
- Fastest Lap – #12 AMG-Mercedes – 1:24.601
- Distance – 695.300 km
- Average Speed – 173.150 km/h

FIA GT Championship
Previous race: 1997 FIA GT Spa 4 Hours	1997 season	Next race: 1997 Suzuka 1000km
