= 1997 FIA GT Silverstone 4 Hours =

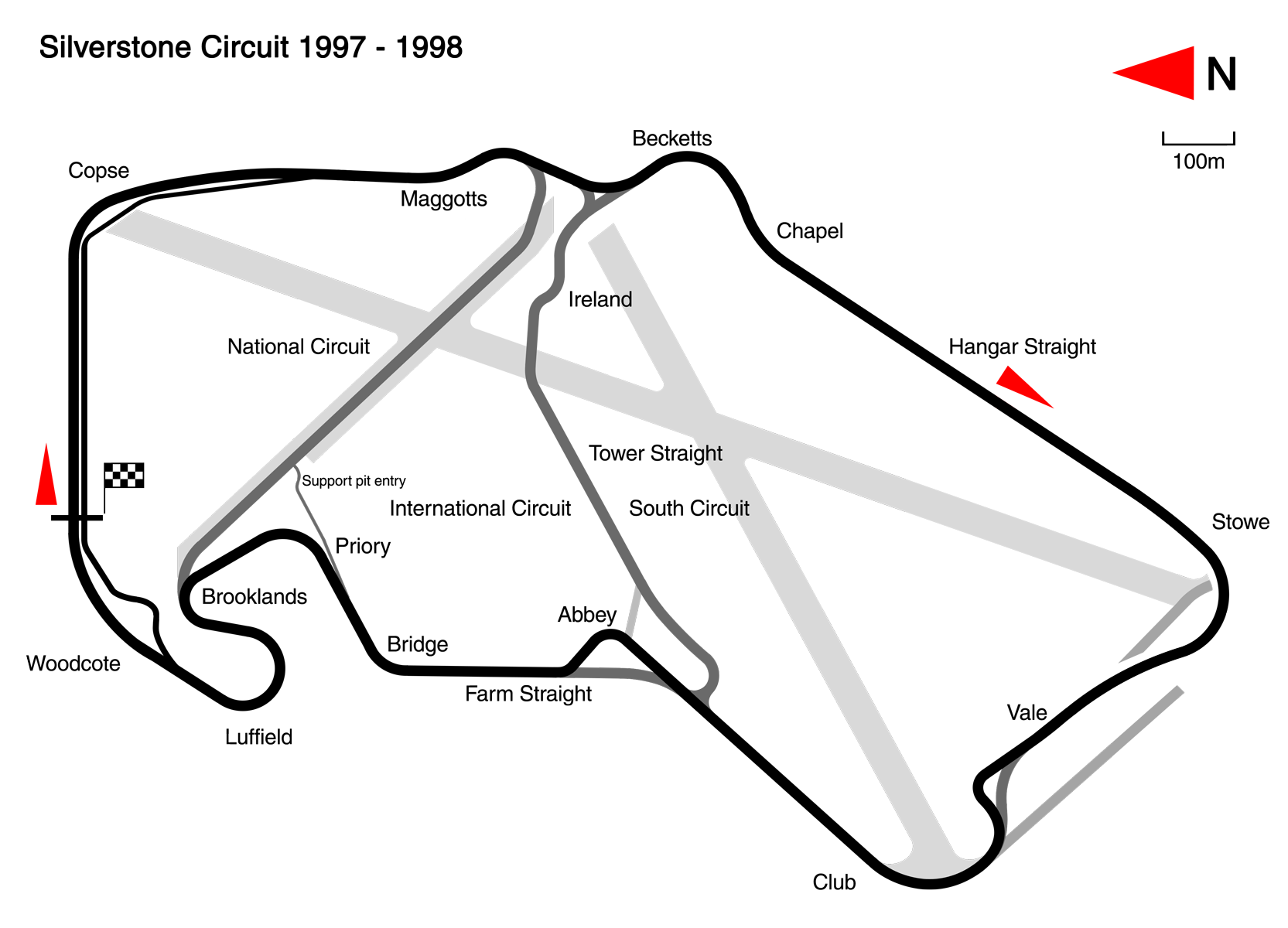
Map of the Silverstone Circuit (1997–1998)

The 1997 FIA GT Silverstone 4 Hours was the second race of the 1997 FIA GT Championship season. It was run at the Silverstone Circuit, United Kingdom on May 11, 1997.

This race was scheduled for four hours, but was stopped shortly after three due to heavy rainfall.

== Official results ==
Class winners in bold. Cars failing to complete 75% of winner's distance marked as Not Classified (NC).

Pos	Class	No	Team	Drivers	Chassis	Tyre	Laps
Pos	Class	No	Team	Drivers	Engine	Tyre	Laps
1	**GT1**	**9**	**(Germany) BMW Motorsport (Germany) Schnitzer Motorsport**	**(Netherlands) Peter Kox (Italy) Roberto Ravaglia**	**McLaren F1 GTR**	**MI**	**87**
1	**GT1**	**9**	**(Germany) BMW Motorsport (Germany) Schnitzer Motorsport**	**(Netherlands) Peter Kox (Italy) Roberto Ravaglia**	**BMW S70 6.0L V12**	**MI**	**87**
2	GT1	11	(Germany) AMG-Mercedes	(Germany) Bernd Schneider (Austria) Alexander Wurz	Mercedes-Benz CLK GTR	**B**	87
2	GT1	11	(Germany) AMG-Mercedes	(Germany) Bernd Schneider (Austria) Alexander Wurz	Mercedes-Benz LS600 6.0L V12	**B**	87
3	GT1	8	(Germany) BMW Motorsport (Germany) Schnitzer Motorsport	(Finland) JJ Lehto (United Kingdom) Steve Soper	McLaren F1 GTR	**MI**	87
3	GT1	8	(Germany) BMW Motorsport (Germany) Schnitzer Motorsport	(Finland) JJ Lehto (United Kingdom) Steve Soper	BMW S70 6.0L V12	**MI**	87
4	GT1	1	(United Kingdom) Gulf Team Davidoff (United Kingdom) GTC Racing	(United Kingdom) Andrew Gilbert-Scott (France) Pierre-Henri Raphanel (United Kingdom) Ray Bellm	McLaren F1 GTR	**MI**	87
4	GT1	1	(United Kingdom) Gulf Team Davidoff (United Kingdom) GTC Racing	(United Kingdom) Andrew Gilbert-Scott (France) Pierre-Henri Raphanel (United Kingdom) Ray Bellm	BMW S70 6.0L V12	**MI**	87
5	GT1	6	(Germany) Porsche AG	(Germany) Hans-Joachim Stuck (Belgium) Thierry Boutsen	Porsche 911 GT1	**MI**	87
5	GT1	6	(Germany) Porsche AG	(Germany) Hans-Joachim Stuck (Belgium) Thierry Boutsen	Porsche 3.2L Turbo Flat-6	**MI**	87
6	GT1	27	(United Kingdom) Parabolica Motorsport	(United Kingdom) Chris Goodwin (United Kingdom) Gary Ayles	McLaren F1 GTR	**MI**	87
6	GT1	27	(United Kingdom) Parabolica Motorsport	(United Kingdom) Chris Goodwin (United Kingdom) Gary Ayles	BMW S70 6.0L V12	**MI**	87
7	GT1	18	(Germany) Schübel Engineering	(Portugal) Pedro Lamy (France) Bob Wollek	Porsche 911 GT1	**MI**	84
7	GT1	18	(Germany) Schübel Engineering	(Portugal) Pedro Lamy (France) Bob Wollek	Porsche 3.2L Turbo Flat-6	**MI**	84
8	**GT2**	**52**	**(France) Viper Team Oreca**	**(United Kingdom) Justin Bell (United States) Tommy Archer**	**Chrysler Viper GTS-R**	**MI**	**83**
8	**GT2**	**52**	**(France) Viper Team Oreca**	**(United Kingdom) Justin Bell (United States) Tommy Archer**	**Chrysler 8.0L V10**	**MI**	**83**
9	GT1	2	(United Kingdom) Gulf Team Davidoff (United Kingdom) GTC Racing	(Denmark) John Nielsen (Germany) Thomas Bscher	McLaren F1 GTR	**MI**	83
9	GT1	2	(United Kingdom) Gulf Team Davidoff (United Kingdom) GTC Racing	(Denmark) John Nielsen (Germany) Thomas Bscher	BMW S70 6.0L V12	**MI**	83
10	GT2	56	(Germany) Roock Racing	(Germany) Claudia Hürtgen (Switzerland) Bruno Eichmann (Portugal) Ni Amorim	Porsche 911 GT2	**MI**	83
10	GT2	56	(Germany) Roock Racing	(Germany) Claudia Hürtgen (Switzerland) Bruno Eichmann (Portugal) Ni Amorim	Porsche 3.6L Turbo Flat-6	**MI**	83
11	GT2	51	(France) Viper Team Oreca	(France) Philippe Gache (Monaco) Olivier Beretta	Chrysler Viper GTS-R	**MI**	82
11	GT2	51	(France) Viper Team Oreca	(France) Philippe Gache (Monaco) Olivier Beretta	Chrysler 8.0L V10	**MI**	82
12	GT1	26	(Germany) Konrad Motorsport	(Austria) Franz Konrad (Italy) Mauro Baldi	Porsche 911 GT1	**P**	82
12	GT1	26	(Germany) Konrad Motorsport	(Austria) Franz Konrad (Italy) Mauro Baldi	Porsche 3.2L Turbo Flat-6	**P**	82
13	GT1	5	(United Kingdom) David Price Racing	(Australia) David Brabham (United Kingdom) Perry McCarthy	Panoz Esperante GTR-1	**G**	81
13	GT1	5	(United Kingdom) David Price Racing	(Australia) David Brabham (United Kingdom) Perry McCarthy	Ford (Roush) 6.0L V8	**G**	81
14	GT1	19	(Germany) Martin Veyhle Racing (MVR)	(Germany) Gerd Ruch (Germany) Alexander Grau	McLaren F1 GTR	**G**	80
14	GT1	19	(Germany) Martin Veyhle Racing (MVR)	(Germany) Gerd Ruch (Germany) Alexander Grau	BMW S70 6.1L V12	**G**	80
15	GT2	64	(Germany) Kremer Racing	(Spain) Tomás Saldaña (Spain) Alfonso de Orléans (Sweden) Carl Rosenblad	Porsche 911 GT2	**G**	80
15	GT2	64	(Germany) Kremer Racing	(Spain) Tomás Saldaña (Spain) Alfonso de Orléans (Sweden) Carl Rosenblad	Porsche 3.6L Turbo Flat-6	**G**	80
16	GT2	65	(Germany) RWS	(Italy) Raffaele Sangiuolo (Italy) Luca Riccitelli (Switzerland) Charles Margueron	Porsche 911 GT2	?	79
16	GT2	65	(Germany) RWS	(Italy) Raffaele Sangiuolo (Italy) Luca Riccitelli (Switzerland) Charles Margueron	Porsche 3.6L Turbo Flat-6	?	79
17	GT2	68	(Italy) Rennsport Italia	(Italy) Angelo Zadra (Italy) Renato Mastropietro (Italy) Leonardo Maddalena	Porsche 911 GT2	?	78
17	GT2	68	(Italy) Rennsport Italia	(Italy) Angelo Zadra (Italy) Renato Mastropietro (Italy) Leonardo Maddalena	Porsche 3.6L Turbo Flat-6	?	78
18	GT2	76	(United Kingdom) EMKA Racing	(United Kingdom) Steve O'Rourke (United Kingdom) Tim Sugden (United Kingdom) Win Percy	Porsche 911 GT2	?	78
18	GT2	76	(United Kingdom) EMKA Racing	(United Kingdom) Steve O'Rourke (United Kingdom) Tim Sugden (United Kingdom) Win Percy	Porsche 3.6L Turbo Flat-6	?	78
19	GT2	57	(Germany) Roock Racing	(France) François Lafon (France) Jean-Marc Smadja (France) Stéphane Ortelli	Porsche 911 GT2	**MI**	78
19	GT2	57	(Germany) Roock Racing	(France) François Lafon (France) Jean-Marc Smadja (France) Stéphane Ortelli	Porsche 3.6L Turbo Flat-6	**MI**	78
20	GT2	66	(Germany) Konrad Motorsport	(Switzerland) Toni Seiler (Italy) Marco Spinelli (United Kingdom) Robert Nearn	Porsche 911 GT2	**P**	78
20	GT2	66	(Germany) Konrad Motorsport	(Switzerland) Toni Seiler (Italy) Marco Spinelli (United Kingdom) Robert Nearn	Porsche 3.6L Turbo Flat-6	**P**	78
21	GT2	53	(United Kingdom) Chamberlain Engineering	(Netherlands) Hans Hugenholtz (Finland) Jari Nurminen	Chrysler Viper GTS-R	**G**	77
21	GT2	53	(United Kingdom) Chamberlain Engineering	(Netherlands) Hans Hugenholtz (Finland) Jari Nurminen	Chrysler 8.0L V10	**G**	77
22	GT2	54	(United Kingdom) Chamberlain Engineering	(United Kingdom) Richard Dean (United Kingdom) Peter Hardman	Chrysler Viper GTS-R	**G**	77
22	GT2	54	(United Kingdom) Chamberlain Engineering	(United Kingdom) Richard Dean (United Kingdom) Peter Hardman	Chrysler 8.0L V10	**G**	77
23	GT2	62	(Switzerland) Stadler Motorsport	(Switzerland) Uwe Sick (Switzerland) Denis Lay (Germany) Axel Röhr	Porsche 911 GT2	**P**	77
23	GT2	62	(Switzerland) Stadler Motorsport	(Switzerland) Uwe Sick (Switzerland) Denis Lay (Germany) Axel Röhr	Porsche 3.6L Turbo Flat-6	**P**	77
24	GT2	60	(Netherlands) Marcos Racing International	(Netherlands) John Schumann (United Kingdom) Christian Vann	Marcos LM600	**D**	77
24	GT2	60	(Netherlands) Marcos Racing International	(Netherlands) John Schumann (United Kingdom) Christian Vann	Chevrolet 5.9L V8	**D**	77
25	GT2	55	(Austria) Karl Augustin	(Germany) Helmut Reis (Austria) Hans-Jörg Hofer	Porsche 911 GT2	**G**	76
25	GT2	55	(Austria) Karl Augustin	(Germany) Helmut Reis (Austria) Hans-Jörg Hofer	Porsche 3.6L Turbo Flat-6	**G**	76
26	GT1	31	(Austria) Karl Augustin	(Austria) Karl Augustin (Austria) Horst Felbermayr (Italy) Stefano Buttiero	Porsche 911 GT2 Evo	**G**	76
26	GT1	31	(Austria) Karl Augustin	(Austria) Karl Augustin (Austria) Horst Felbermayr (Italy) Stefano Buttiero	Porsche 3.6L Turbo Flat-6	**G**	76
27	GT2	63	(Germany) Krauss Motorsport	(Germany) Michael Trunk (Germany) Bernhard Müller	Porsche 911 GT2	**P**	76
27	GT2	63	(Germany) Krauss Motorsport	(Germany) Michael Trunk (Germany) Bernhard Müller	Porsche 3.6L Turbo Flat-6	**P**	76
28	GT2	75	(United Kingdom) G-Force Strandell	(United Kingdom) John Greasley (United Kingdom) Geoff Lister	Porsche 911 GT2	**D**	75
28	GT2	75	(United Kingdom) G-Force Strandell	(United Kingdom) John Greasley (United Kingdom) Geoff Lister	Porsche 3.6L Turbo Flat-6	**D**	75
29	GT2	58	(France) Estoril Racing	(France) Michel Monteiro (Portugal) Manuel Monteiro	Porsche 911 GT2	?	73
29	GT2	58	(France) Estoril Racing	(France) Michel Monteiro (Portugal) Manuel Monteiro	Porsche 3.6L Turbo Flat-6	?	73
30	GT2	50	(United Kingdom) Agusta Racing Team	(Italy) Rocky Agusta (Italy) Almo Coppelli	Callaway Corvette LM-GT	**D**	70
30	GT2	50	(United Kingdom) Agusta Racing Team	(Italy) Rocky Agusta (Italy) Almo Coppelli	Chevrolet 6.3L V8	**D**	70
31	GT2	79	(United States) Saleen-Allen Speedlab (United Kingdom) Cirtek Motorsport	(United Kingdom) Peter Owen (United Kingdom) James Kaye (United Kingdom) Richard Piper	Saleen Mustang RRR	**D**	68
31	GT2	79	(United States) Saleen-Allen Speedlab (United Kingdom) Cirtek Motorsport	(United Kingdom) Peter Owen (United Kingdom) James Kaye (United Kingdom) Richard Piper	Ford 5.9L V8	**D**	68
32	GT1	10	(Germany) AMG-Mercedes	(Italy) Alessandro Nannini (Germany) Marcel Tiemann	Mercedes-Benz CLK GTR	**B**	68
32	GT1	10	(Germany) AMG-Mercedes	(Italy) Alessandro Nannini (Germany) Marcel Tiemann	Mercedes-Benz LS600 6.0L V12	**B**	68
33	GT2	80	(United Kingdom) Morgan Motor Company	(United Kingdom) Charles Morgan (United Kingdom) William Wykeham	Morgan Plus 8 GTR	**D**	66
33	GT2	80	(United Kingdom) Morgan Motor Company	(United Kingdom) Charles Morgan (United Kingdom) William Wykeham	Rover V8 3.9L V8	**D**	66
34	GT2	78	(United States) Saleen-Allen Speedlab (United Kingdom) Cirtek Motorsport	(United Kingdom) Robert Schirle (United Kingdom) James Warnock (United Kingdom) Allen Lloyd	Saleen Mustang RRR	**D**	65
34	GT2	78	(United States) Saleen-Allen Speedlab (United Kingdom) Cirtek Motorsport	(United Kingdom) Robert Schirle (United Kingdom) James Warnock (United Kingdom) Allen Lloyd	Ford 5.9L V8	**D**	65
35	GT1	24	(United Kingdom) GBF UK Ltd.	(Italy) Mauro Martini (Italy) Andrea Boldrini	Lotus Elise GT1	**MI**	63
35	GT1	24	(United Kingdom) GBF UK Ltd.	(Italy) Mauro Martini (Italy) Andrea Boldrini	Lotus 3.5L Turbo V8	**MI**	63
36 DNF	GT1	16	(Germany) Roock Racing	(Germany) Ralf Kelleners (France) Yannick Dalmas	Porsche 911 GT1	**MI**	48
36 DNF	GT1	16	(Germany) Roock Racing	(Germany) Ralf Kelleners (France) Yannick Dalmas	Porsche 3.2L Turbo Flat-6	**MI**	48
37 DNF	GT1	23	(United Kingdom) GBF UK Ltd.	(Italy) Luca Badoer (Italy) Mimmo Schiattarella	Lotus Elise GT1	**MI**	46
37 DNF	GT1	23	(United Kingdom) GBF UK Ltd.	(Italy) Luca Badoer (Italy) Mimmo Schiattarella	Lotus 3.5L Turbo V8	**MI**	46
38 DNF	GT1	13	(United Kingdom) Lotus Racing Franck Muller (France) Giroix Racing	(France) Fabien Giroix (Switzerland) Jean-Denis Délétraz	Lotus Elise GT1	**P**	45
38 DNF	GT1	13	(United Kingdom) Lotus Racing Franck Muller (France) Giroix Racing	(France) Fabien Giroix (Switzerland) Jean-Denis Délétraz	Chevrolet LT5 6.0L V8	**P**	45
39 DNF	GT2	59	(Netherlands) Marcos Racing International	(Netherlands) Cor Euser (Germany) Harald Becker	Marcos LM600	**D**	45
39 DNF	GT2	59	(Netherlands) Marcos Racing International	(Netherlands) Cor Euser (Germany) Harald Becker	Chevrolet 5.9L V8	**D**	45
40 DNF	GT1	15	(United Kingdom) Lotus Racing Franck Muller (France) Giroix Racing	(Brazil) Maurizio Sandro Sala (Thailand) Ratanakul Prutirat	Lotus Elise GT1	**P**	41
40 DNF	GT1	15	(United Kingdom) Lotus Racing Franck Muller (France) Giroix Racing	(Brazil) Maurizio Sandro Sala (Thailand) Ratanakul Prutirat	Chevrolet LT5 6.0L V8	**P**	41
41 DNF	GT2	70	(Germany) Dellenbach Motorsport	(Austria) Manfred Jurasz (Germany) Rainer Bonnetsmüller	Porsche 911 GT2	**D**	33
41 DNF	GT2	70	(Germany) Dellenbach Motorsport	(Austria) Manfred Jurasz (Germany) Rainer Bonnetsmüller	Porsche 3.6L Turbo Flat-6	**D**	33
42 DNF	GT2	77	(United States) Saleen-Allen Speedlab (United Kingdom) Cirtek Motorsport	(United States) Steve Saleen (United States) Price Cobb (Spain) Carlos Palau	Saleen Mustang RRR	**D**	17
42 DNF	GT2	77	(United States) Saleen-Allen Speedlab (United Kingdom) Cirtek Motorsport	(United States) Steve Saleen (United States) Price Cobb (Spain) Carlos Palau	Ford 5.9L V8	**D**	17
43 DNF	GT1	14	(United Kingdom) Lotus Racing Franck Muller (France) Giroix Racing	(Netherlands) Jan Lammers (Netherlands) Mike Hezemans	Lotus Elise GT1	**P**	15
43 DNF	GT1	14	(United Kingdom) Lotus Racing Franck Muller (France) Giroix Racing	(Netherlands) Jan Lammers (Netherlands) Mike Hezemans	Chevrolet LT5 6.0L V8	**P**	15
44 DNF	GT1	20	(France) DAMS Panoz	(France) Franck Lagorce (France) Éric Bernard	Panoz Esperante GTR-1	**MI**	7
44 DNF	GT1	20	(France) DAMS Panoz	(France) Franck Lagorce (France) Éric Bernard	Ford (Roush) 6.0L V8	**MI**	7
45 DNF	GT1	4	(United Kingdom) David Price Racing	(United Kingdom) Andy Wallace (United Kingdom) James Weaver	Panoz Esperante GTR-1	**G**	4
45 DNF	GT1	4	(United Kingdom) David Price Racing	(United Kingdom) Andy Wallace (United Kingdom) James Weaver	Ford (Roush Racing) 6.0L V8	**G**	4
46 DNF	GT1	17	(France) JB Racing	(France) Emmanuel Collard (Germany) Jürgen von Gartzen	Porsche 911 GT1	**MI**	0
46 DNF	GT1	17	(France) JB Racing	(France) Emmanuel Collard (Germany) Jürgen von Gartzen	Porsche 3.2L Turbo Flat-6	**MI**	0
47 DNF	GT1	22	(Italy) BMS Scuderia Italia	(Italy) Pierluigi Martini (Italy) Christian Pescatori	Porsche 911 GT1	**P**	0
47 DNF	GT1	22	(Italy) BMS Scuderia Italia	(Italy) Pierluigi Martini (Italy) Christian Pescatori	Porsche 3.2L Turbo Flat-6	**P**	0
DNS	GT1	3	(United Kingdom) Gulf Team Davidoff (United Kingdom) GTC Racing	(France) Jean-Marc Gounon (France) Pierre-Henri Raphanel	McLaren F1 GTR	**MI**	–
DNS	GT1	3	(United Kingdom) Gulf Team Davidoff (United Kingdom) GTC Racing	(France) Jean-Marc Gounon (France) Pierre-Henri Raphanel	BMW S70 6.0L V12	**MI**	–
DNS	GT2	69	(Germany) Proton Competition	(Germany) Gerold Ried (France) Patrick Vuillaume	Porsche 911 GT2	**P**	–
DNS	GT2	69	(Germany) Proton Competition	(Germany) Gerold Ried (France) Patrick Vuillaume	Porsche 3.6L Turbo Flat-6	**P**	–

== Statistics ==
- Pole Position – #11 AMG-Mercedes – 1:41.193
- Fastest Lap – #18 Schübel Engineering – 1:45.946
- Distance – 447.201 km
- Average Speed – 133.859 km/h

FIA GT Championship
Previous race: 1997 FIA GT Hockenheim 4 Hours	1997 season	Next race: 1997 FIA GT Helsinki 3 Hours
