= Lotus Elise GT1 =

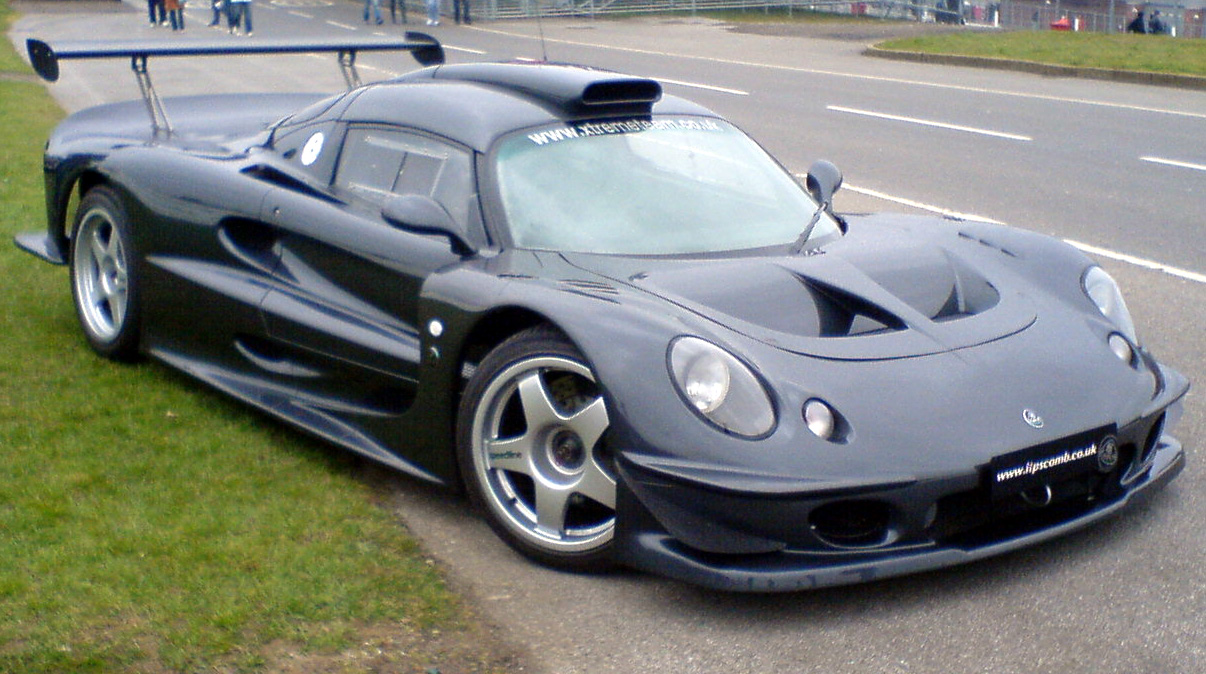
- The lone Elise GT1 road car on display

Overview
- Manufacturer: Lotus Cars
- Also called: Type 115; Bitter GT1
- Production: 1997; 1 road car and 7 race cars
- Assembly: United Kingdom: Hethel, Norfolk
- Designer: Julian Thomson

Body and chassis
- Class: GT1
- Body style: 2-door coupe
- Layout: Rear mid-engine, rear-wheel-drive
- Related: Lotus Esprit GT1; Lotus Esprit S4; Lotus Elise S1; Lotus Exige S1

Powertrain
- Engine: 5.7 L Chevrolet LT5 V8; 3.5 L Lotus Type 918 twin-turbocharged V8 (road car); 8.0 L Chrysler 356-T6 V10 (Bitter GT1)
- Transmission: 5-speed Renault manual (road car), 6-speed sequential

Dimensions
- Wheelbase: 2,675 mm (105 in)
- Length: 4,510 mm (178 in)
- Width: 2,070 mm (81 in)
- Height: 1,100 mm (43 in)
- Kerb weight: 1,050 kg (2,315 lb) (road car); 950 kg (2,094 lb)

Chronology
- Predecessor: Lotus Esprit GT1

The Lotus Elise GT1 (also known as the Lotus GT1 and known internally as Type-115) is a race car developed for grand tourer-style sports car racing starting in 1997.

== Development ==
Lotus Cars had previously been using the Lotus Esprit GT1—a racing version of their Lotus Esprit road car—in the BPR Global GT Series since its foundation in 1994, competing in the premier GT1 class against the McLaren F1 GTR, Venturi 600LM, Ferrari F40 GTE and others. However, in 1997, the series came to be known as the FIA GT Championship and manufacturer involvement was increased with the new international exposure. Porsche was the first to start a new breed of racing cars in 1996, with their purpose-built homologation special known as the 911 GT1. This was quickly followed by the announcement that Mercedes-Benz planned to do the same with their CLK GTR for 1997.

Thus Lotus decided that in order to remain competitive in the GT1 class, it would be required to follow the blueprint set by Porsche and Mercedes-Benz. However, the company management was aware that they lacked the resources available that Porsche and Mercedes had to create not only the race cars but also the street legal variants. Therefore, at a guaranteed financial loss, Lotus decided to take an alternate route—making a single road version of their new race car.

With this in mind, Lotus set about to develop their racing car. Lotus decided to abandon the aging Esprit chassis and instead turn to its new sports car, the Elise.

Lotus knew that the Elise's inline-4 engine would not be competitive so it was initially decided that the car would use the 3.5 L V8 engine from the Esprit sports car. However, testing showed that the engine was not as reliable as hoped. After installation of it in the road car, Lotus teams were left to decide whether or not to use the Lotus V8 or opt for a 5.7 L LT5 V8, a car which Lotus had jointly developed when they had been under the ownership of General Motors. Lotus further developed the Chevrolet engine by fitting it with a carbon intake, developing a dry sump system. Initially it was an aluminium engine block, which proved to be problematic, The last two races at Sebring and Laguna Seca, they decided to change to a NASCAR cast-iron block with two valves which resulted in bigger restrictors sizes of 2 x 36.8 mm. for the Elise GT1 Race car.

Seven Elise GT1 racing chassis were built, by G.T.I. racing; and financed and owned by Toine Hezemans and new President Roman Artioli, two cars going to the factory team GT1 Lotus Racing (one car run by Fabien Giroix's First Racing) as well as privateers GBF UK and Martin Veyhle Racing. The factory GT1 Lotus Racing team and Veyle racing would be the only ones to opt for the Chevrolet V8 instead of the Lotus twin-turbocharged unit.

== Performance ==
The Elise GT1's road car's 3.5 L Type 918 Garrett twin-turbocharged V8 engine has a power output of 550 PS (540 hp; 400 kW) at 6,500 rpm and the factory race cars' modified 5.7 L Chevrolet V8 engine has a power output of ca 600 PS (590 hp; 440 kW) at 7,200 rpm. Either engine propelled the car from 0 to 60 mph in 3.8 seconds and on a top speed in excess of 200 mph. The race cars were initially fitted with a Hewland 6-speed sequential manual transmission, although multiple other transmissions were used during their life span.

For the last two races of the 1997 FIA GT Championship at Sebring and Laguna Seca the factory Lotus used a 2-valve NASCAR engine with a steel block which gave more power and was much more reliable. The car was uncompetitive throughout its factory racing life.

== Racing history ==
=== 1997 ===
Debuting at Hockenheim, on 13 April (first round of the 1997 FIA GT Championship season), the three factory Elise GT1s and the privateer GBF car took to the grid. Their debut was short lived, as all four cars failed to finish, all due to alternator problems in the engine. For race two at Silverstone, privateer GBF UK received their second car (an untested chassis bearing number 06 driven by Andrea Boldrini and Mauro Martini). Again the three factory cars suffered, failing to finish because of gearbox difficulties. GBF's Elise GT1s fared slightly better, with one of their entries actually finishing, although classified last and 25 laps down from the winner.

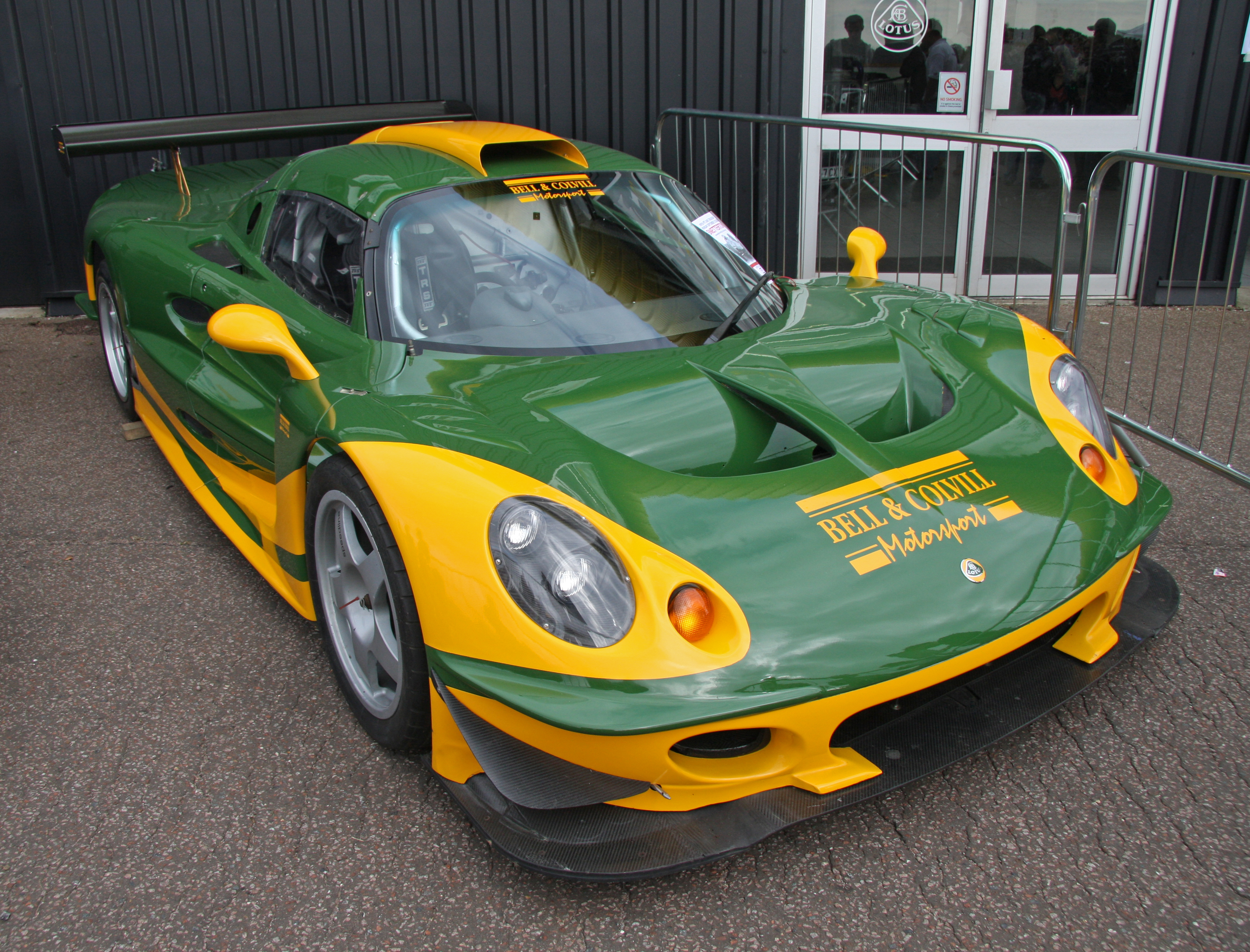
One of six Elise GT1 race cars following restoration

The third race of the season in Helsinki was a shorter race, featuring a smaller field with 23 cars. Only three Elise GT1s were entered, but GBF was able to succeed in taking 5th place, earning them points in the championship. The other two Elise GT1s also finished the race as well, an improvement for the company.

As the season progressed, the teams began to suffer. After Helsinki was the 24 Hours of Le Mans, in which only a lone GT1 was entered due to concern over the car's ability to last 24 hours. The car had an engine block failure after 121 laps.

Returning to the FIA championship at the Nürburgring, the full complement of five cars managed a best result of only 11th, while at Spa-Francorchamps they achieved 8th. But at Zeltweg all five cars failed to finish again. The teams did not attempt the Suzuka round and again could only earn 12th place at Donington Park and 11th at Mugello when the series returned to Europe. The final two races in the United States saw only the factory team bring two cars, with US prepared NASCAR 5.7 ltr Chevrolet engines with 2 valves 1 cam and a cast iron block, to overcome the previous engine failures. Also because of 2 valves and weight increase the restrictor size was now 2 x 36.8 and gave more power.They managed to finish on a best place of 9th and 13th respectively. The factory squad ended the season without any points, while GBF's points finish at Helsinki earned them 8th place in the championship.

Following the 1997 season, Lotus and its parent company, Proton, decided that the GT1 was not only lacking in pace in comparison to Porsche, Mercedes-Benz and McLaren, but that it was also extremely expensive. The Chevrolet V8 was not a custom built race engine like its competitors, leaving it lacking in top speed while the Lotus twin-turbocharged V8 was faring even worse. The chassis was also too similar to a production car to compete with the exotic designs of other cars. The project was therefore cancelled and the factory team folded. Toine Hezemans, the owner of G.T.I. racing, took the complete inventory including the two factory cars to Holland and the two cars are still in their family. The privateer teams also either folded or bought more capable cars.

=== 2004 ===
Miraculously, in 2003 British squad Team Elite announced plans to purchase the Elise GT1 chassis #05 and to use in the 12 Hours of Sebring and 24 Hours of Le Mans in 2004 as a closed cockpit Le Mans prototype. This was similar to a plan by Panoz and French squad Larbre Compétition to use a Panoz Esperante GTR-1, a car which had originally competed with the Elise GT1 in FIA GT in 1997, as a closed cockpit prototype as well. The Elise would be modified to meet modern regulations as well as to attempt to bring the seven-year-old car up to speed. At the 2004 12 Hours of Sebring, the car proved its age, lasting a mere seven laps before its transmission failed. The project was promptly cancelled.

== Road version ==
GT regulations at the time required that Lotus produce a road version of the new Elise GT1 to meet homologation requirements.

Mechanically, the Lotus Elise S1's aluminum chassis was retained for the GT1, although it was heavily modified from its standard form. A new carbon fibre/kevlar body that resembled the Elise was built, featuring a much longer length and a bigger width in order to increase the car's aerodynamic capabilities. Overall length grew to 4510 mm, and overall width increased to 2070 mm. Width of both axles was 2000 mm. The front overhang was 940 mm and the rear was 895 mm. Wheelbase is approximately 2675 mm. All of these measurements were made from the center of the car. The weight of the car was around 1050 kg, a little heavier than its track-focused counterparts. Front and rear suspension was double wishbone. An aluminum roll cage was also fitted.

The road version of the GT1 was fitted with a Lotus Type 918 twin-turbocharged V8 engine with a power output of 550 PS (542 HP) at 6,500 RPM, attached to a Renault 5-speed manual transmission.

As of 2017, it is difficult to say where exactly the road version GT1 is. Last time it was seen in public was almost 10 years ago, at the Le Mans Classic. According to some sources it's still owned by Lotus and stored in a warehouse in England, but some say it could have ended up in the hands of a private collector in the Netherlands.

=== Additional information ===
==== Type 918 ====
- Position and location of the engine: behind the driver, central rear longitudinal
- Cycle: 4-stroke
- Turbos: Garrett
- Number and layout of cylinders: V8 (90 deg)
- Type of cooling: Water
- Cylinder block material: Aluminum
- Angle between intake valve and vertical: 21° 30' to bore centre-line
- Angle between exhaust valve and vertical: 20° 30' to bore centre-line
- Camshaft location: over-head DOHC (2/head)
- Intake: 2 valves per cylinder
- Exhaust: 2 valves per cylinder

==== Renault Manual Gearbox ====
- Location: behind engine- longitudinal
- Number of teeth:
  - 1st gear- 11/37
  - 2nd gear- 17/35
  - 3rd gear- 21/29
  - 4th gear- 27/28
  - 5th gear- 41/31
  - Reverse- 11/39
- Shift gear ratio:
  - 1st gear- 3.36
  - 2nd gear- 2.06
  - 3rd gear- 1.38
  - 4th gear- 1.04
  - 5th gear- 0.76
  - Reverse- 3.54

Type of gearbox lubrication is wet sump-oil.

==== Final drive ====
- Type: spiral bevel
- Number of teeth: 9/35
- Shift gear ratio: 3.89

Type of lubrication is wet sump-oil.

Date of homologation: 1 April 1997 End of homologation: 31 December 2004

== Bitter GT1 ==
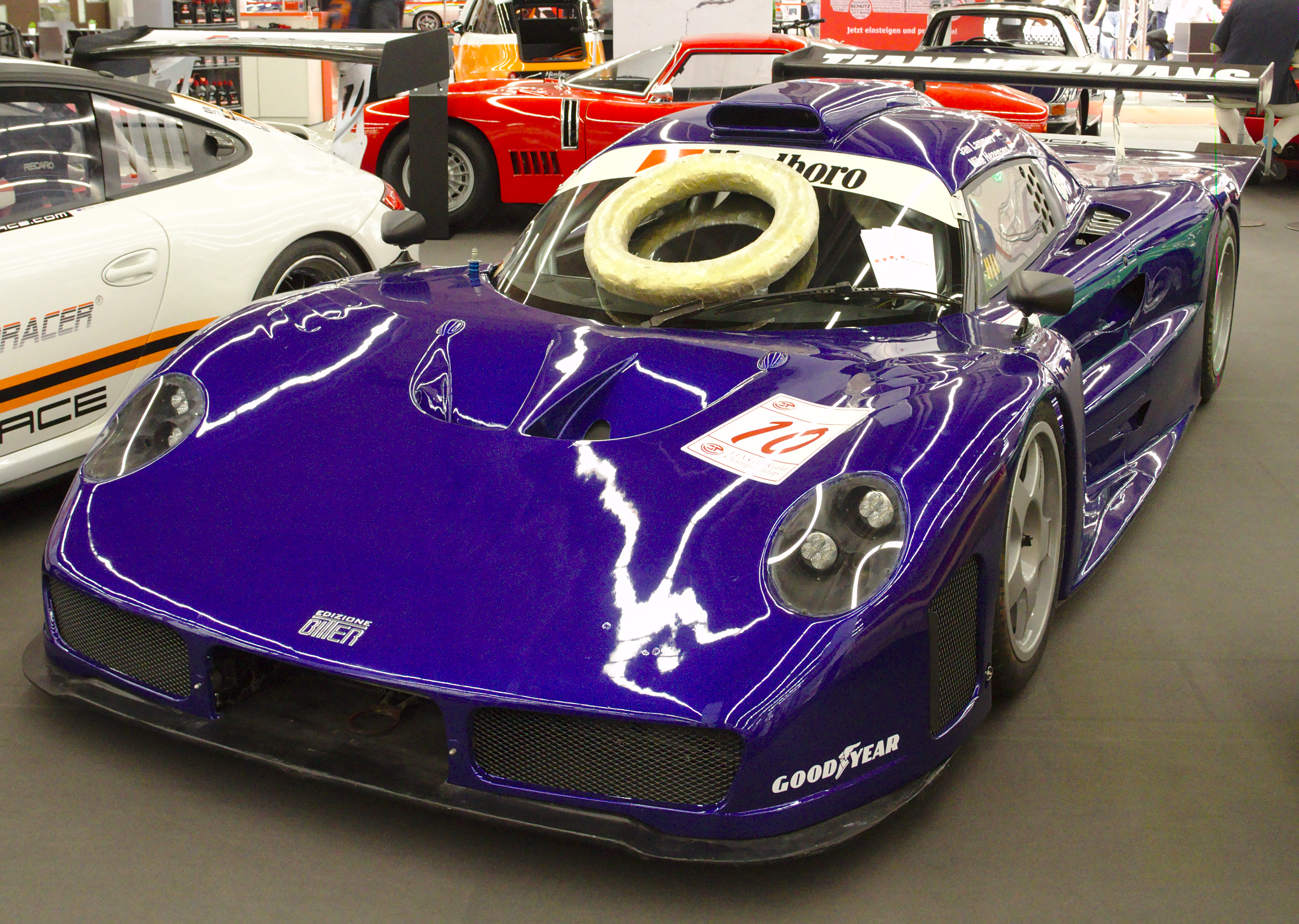
Bitter GT1 at Frankfurt Motor Show 2019

Former Dutch factory driver Mike Hezemans, feeling that the Elise GT1's main faults were in its power and aerodynamics, decided that the car should not be abandoned and convinced his father Toine Hezemans to provide financial help in his project.

The new cars were promised to compete in the 1998 FIA GT Championship season. In order to make the cars compliant to the regulations of the FIA, Hezemans turned to his friend Erich Bitter who was an independent German car manufacturer and founder of Bitter Automobile. He agreed to give the cars his firm's name and the cars were named Bitter GT1.

Toine Hezemans owned two former Elise GT1 chassis abandoned by the factory along with their inventory of parts. Hezemans and his small team consisting of chief mechanic Hans Willemsen and two mechanics, Peter Classen and Mario van Beek, set out to eliminate the known faults in the car.

They took the chassis to the Netherlands and in their small workshop, the car was extensively reworked. The front end was made longer and smoother in an attempt to increase front downforce. To replace the Elise GT1's Chevrolet V8, Hezemans turned to Chrysler, buying a pair of 356-T6 8.0L V10 engines having a power output of 626 PS (460 kW; 617 hp) and 800 N⋅m (590 lb⋅ft) of torque, which were being used in Chrysler's GT2 Vipers. The engine was fitted in the car by extending the chassis. The Hewland gearbox was retained as the team had a small budget.

The cars never matched even the lackluster performance of the original Elise GT1s. The only race in 1998 FIA GT Championship season in which they actually competed, the 1998 British Empire Trophy at Silverstone, saw both Bitters failing to finish, as the torque produced by the new V10 engine was too much for the gearbox. The original Hewland gearbox would be replaced with a unit from Gemini Transmission. But after failing to even get past initial practice at the next race at Hockenheimring, the project was cancelled.

One Bitter GT1 has survived to this day, which is still currently in the ownership of the Hezemans family. The car has been restored to its original 1998 specification by NASCAR Whelen Euro Series team Hendriks Motorsport and was shaken down in January 2021 at TT Circuit Assen by Toine's son Loris Hezemans. The second Bitter GT1 has been rebuilt as a Lotus Elise GT1.
