= Group GT1 =

Former set of regulations held for grand tourer race cars

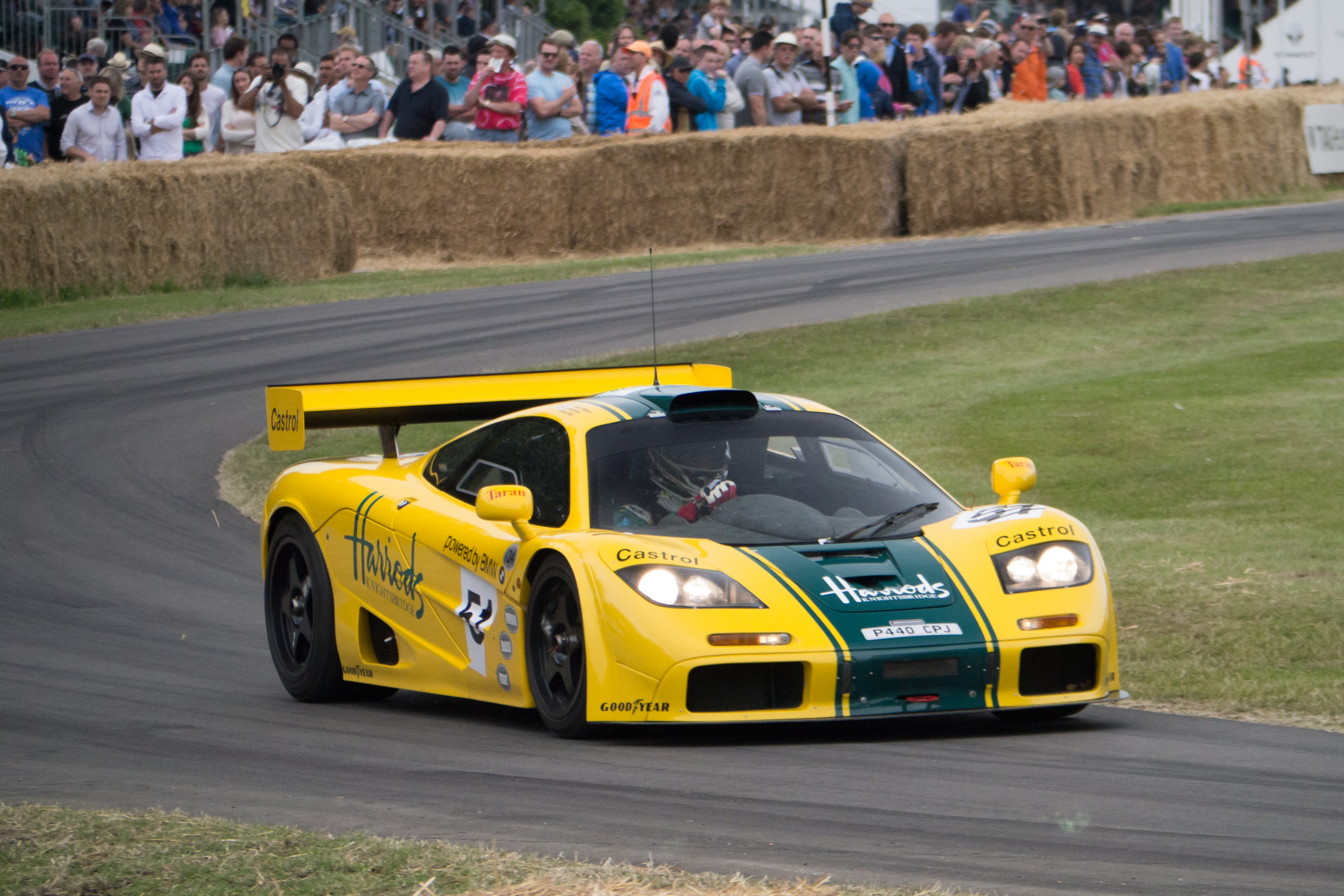
The McLaren F1 GTR, a GT1 car from the early era, which made its debut in 1995. This car is chassis #06R, also known as #29 Harrods Mach One Racing

Group GT1, also known simply as GT1, was a set of regulations maintained formerly by the Fédération Internationale de l'Automobile (FIA), for Grand Tourer racing. The category was created in 1993 as the top class of the BPR Global GT Series and was included in the 24 Hours of Le Mans. It fell under FIA regulation from 1997 after the BPR series came under the control of the FIA, becoming known as the FIA GT Championship. The category was dissolved at the beginning of 2012. The category may be split into four distinctive eras, from its debut in 1993–1996, 1997–1998, 2000–2009, 2010–2012.

== Early years (1993–1996) ==
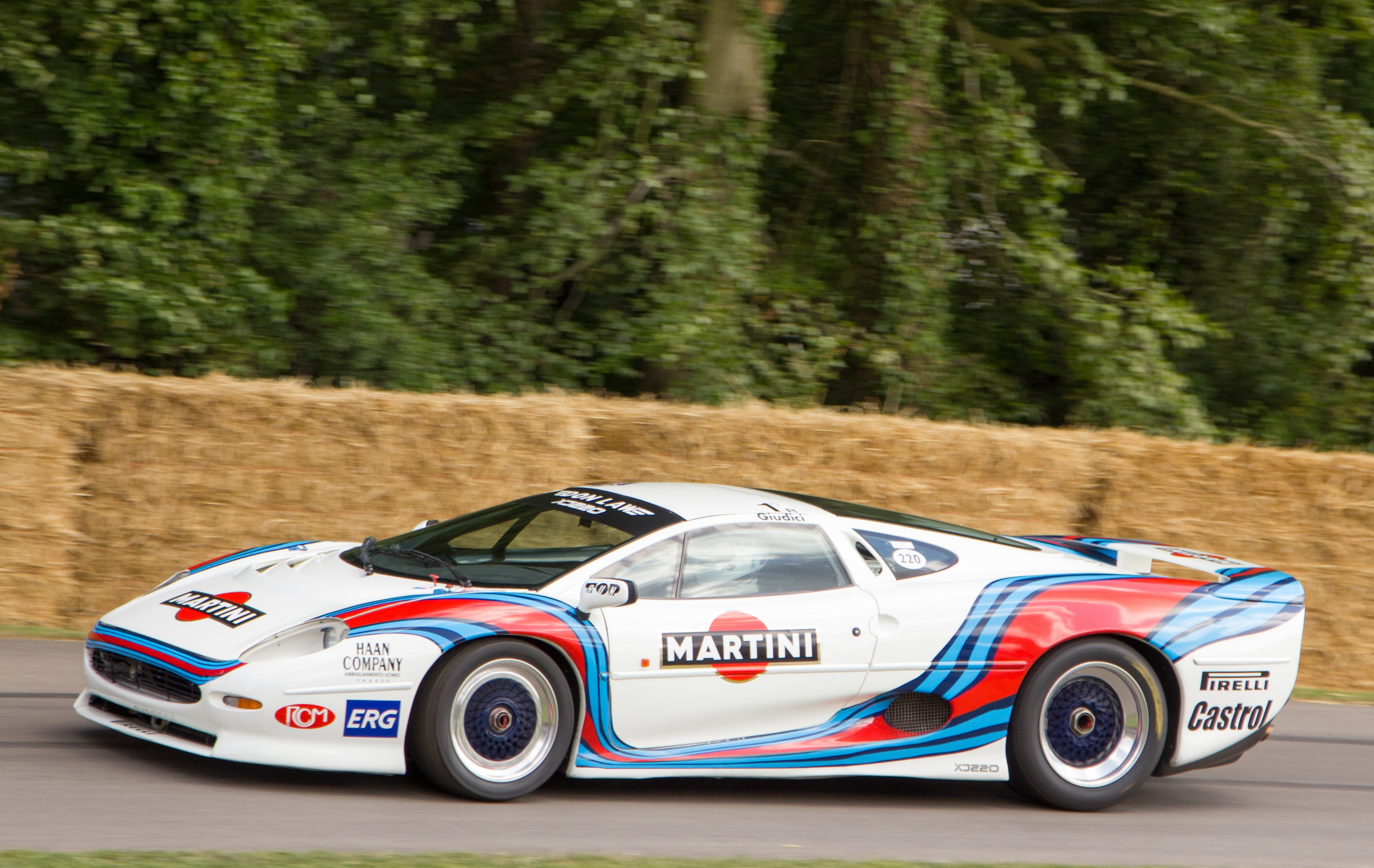
Jaguar XJ220 GT, used in the Italian GT Championship in 1993

The class which was to become known as "GT1" was debuted by the ACO (Automobile Club de l'Ouest) at the 1993 24 Hours of Le Mans, under the name Group GT. The class was first defined in the FIA Appendix J regulations, as Group GT, in 1993.

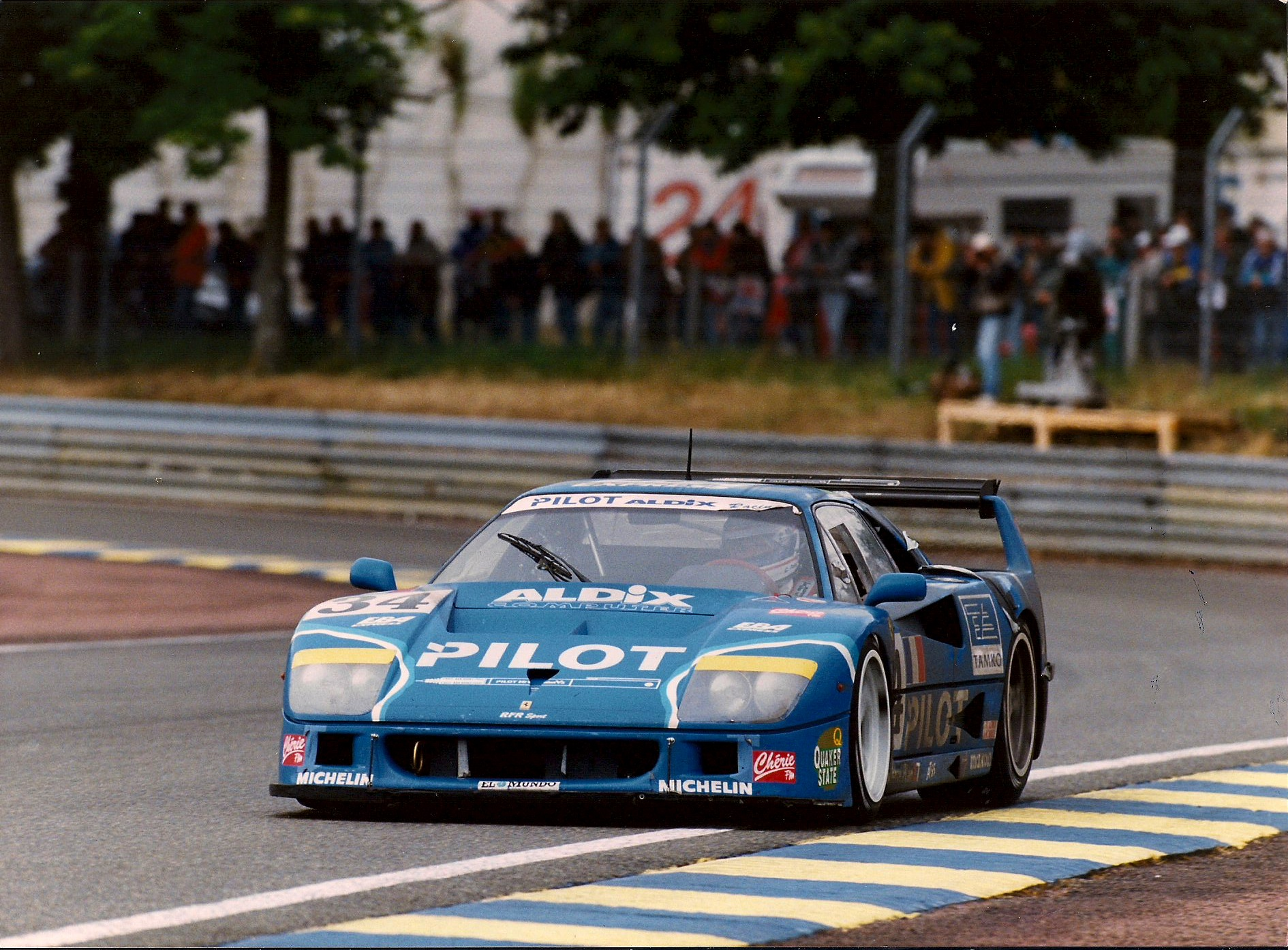
Ferrari F40 GTE LMGT1 at the 1995 24 Hours of Le Mans

In 1994, following the collapse of the FIA World Sportscar Championship in 1992, BPR Global GT series was founded by German Jürgen Barth and Frenchmen Patrick Peter, and Stéphane Ratel (with their last names forming the name of series organizer BPR), as a championship for privateers, with four hour long endurance races. Barth, an ex Le Mans winner, was manager of the customer competitions department at Porsche, Peter was a well-respected race promoter, while Ratel was an executive/investor in the Venturi GT1 project. The Series had four categories, namely GT1-4, with each decreasing number signifying increased freedom in its technical regulations. By 1996 however, the championship had grown, with the grids of the championship growing due to an influx of cars from several makes in the top GT1 class, such as the McLaren F1 GTR, and the new Porsche 911 GT2 Evolution based on the new 993 chassis, which replaced the 964 platform 911 Carrera RSRs that had once dominated the series grids. In addition, professional teams had also begun to enter the championship that had once been intended for privateers, which caused costs to increase dramatically. Porsche even sent in a factory team to several rounds, with its 911 GT1, which was thought by most in the series paddock as being built against the spirit of the rules, because it was a Porsche 962 with just the front of the chassis being shared with a Type 993 911, and it having a street variant simply for the sake of meeting its homologation requirement. The homologation special method was not new, however, with Porsche having already earlier collaborated with Dauer Sportwagen to race the Dauer 962 Le Mans in 1994 (at the time of homologation, only one road car existed) to effectively score the last Le Mans victory for the Porsche 962 series, and Toyota heavily modifying the Toyota MR2 into the SARD MC8-R for the following year's race, also joined by a more pure road derived Toyota Supra and national rivals Nissan Skyline GT-R (both of which had also competed in JGTC with identical specifications) and Honda NSX that year.

== Prototype years (1997–1998) ==
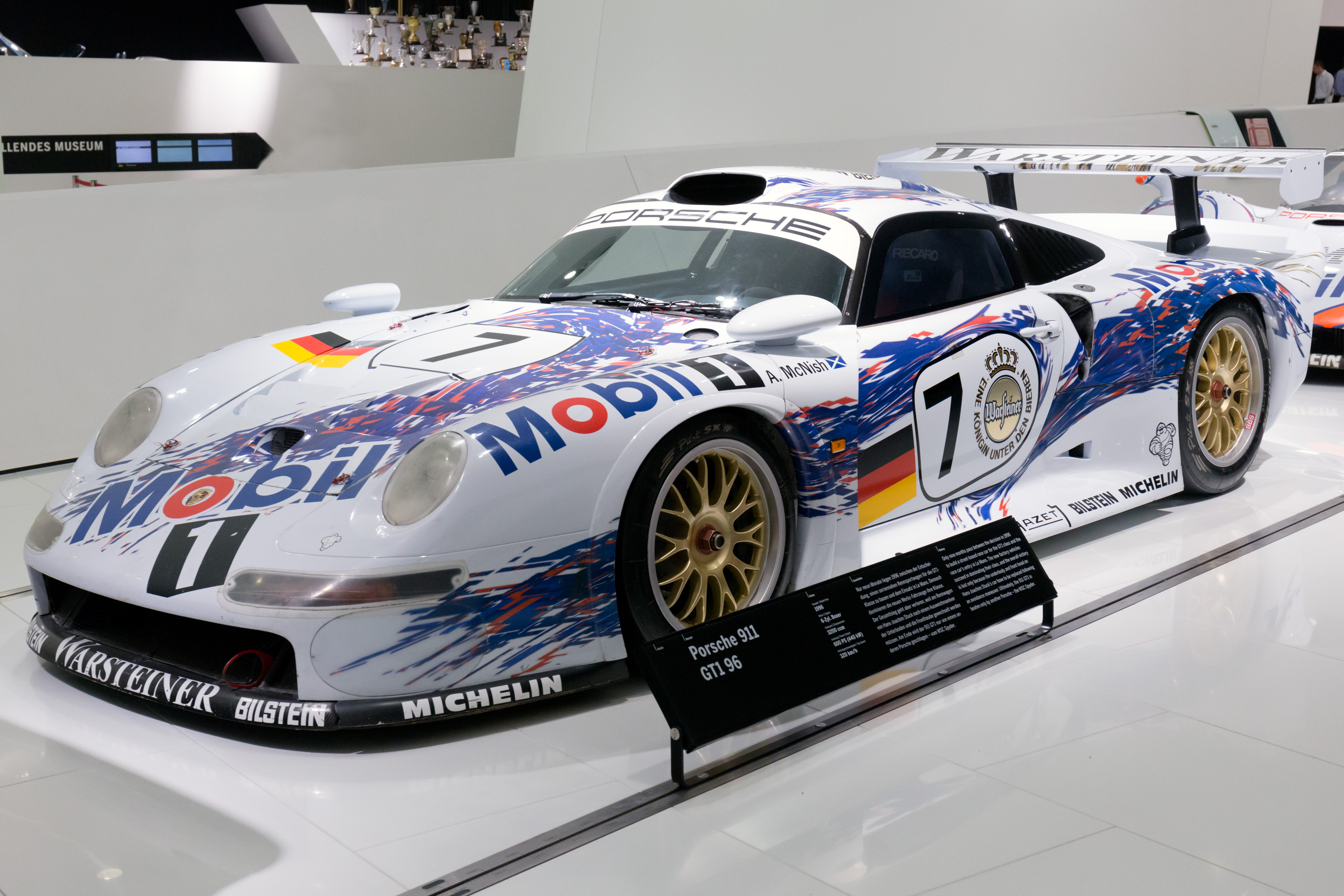
Porsche 911 GT1 (993) which would mark the beginning of the GT1 Prototype era

Following the loss of Patrick Peter from the BPR Organisation, the BPR Organisation evolved into the Stephane Ratel Organisation, with the SRO now co-organising the championship with the FIA. With this change, it saw an even larger influx of professional teams and manufacturers, with the whole grid of the GT1 class consisting of nothing but professional teams. The 1997 season saw the entry of the Mercedes-AMG Team, who would debut the CLK GTR. Similar to the 911 GT1, the CLK GTR was yet another homologation special prototype, with the car only being a racing-version of a production Grand Tourer in name. The car had no street legal version even built by the time the category collapsed in 1999, and shared only the instrumentation, front grille and the four headlamps with the normal CLK (C208). That same season, realising that the F1 GTR would not be competitive against the homologation specials, McLaren also updated the bodywork of the car, with the alterations so significant that they were forced to build a road car with the updated bodywork, effectively turning the car into a homologation special. The resulting car was known as the F1 GT, with three being built. In 1998, realising that with the introduction of the updated CLK LM, and the 911 GT1-98, the F1 GTR could no longer be competitive, McLaren withdrew backing from the program, following BMW which had done so the previous year, in 1997, although two cars would still be entered by Parabolica Motorsports and Davidoff Classic. In 1999, following the total domination of the Mercedes-AMG team in the Championship in the previous season, which saw them win all races in the championship, with both the CLK GTR and LM, no GT1 teams entered the category, apart from the Mercedes-AMG Team. As such, the FIA chose to run the 1999 FIA GT Championship with just the GT2 class.

== GTS "GT1" (1999–2009) ==
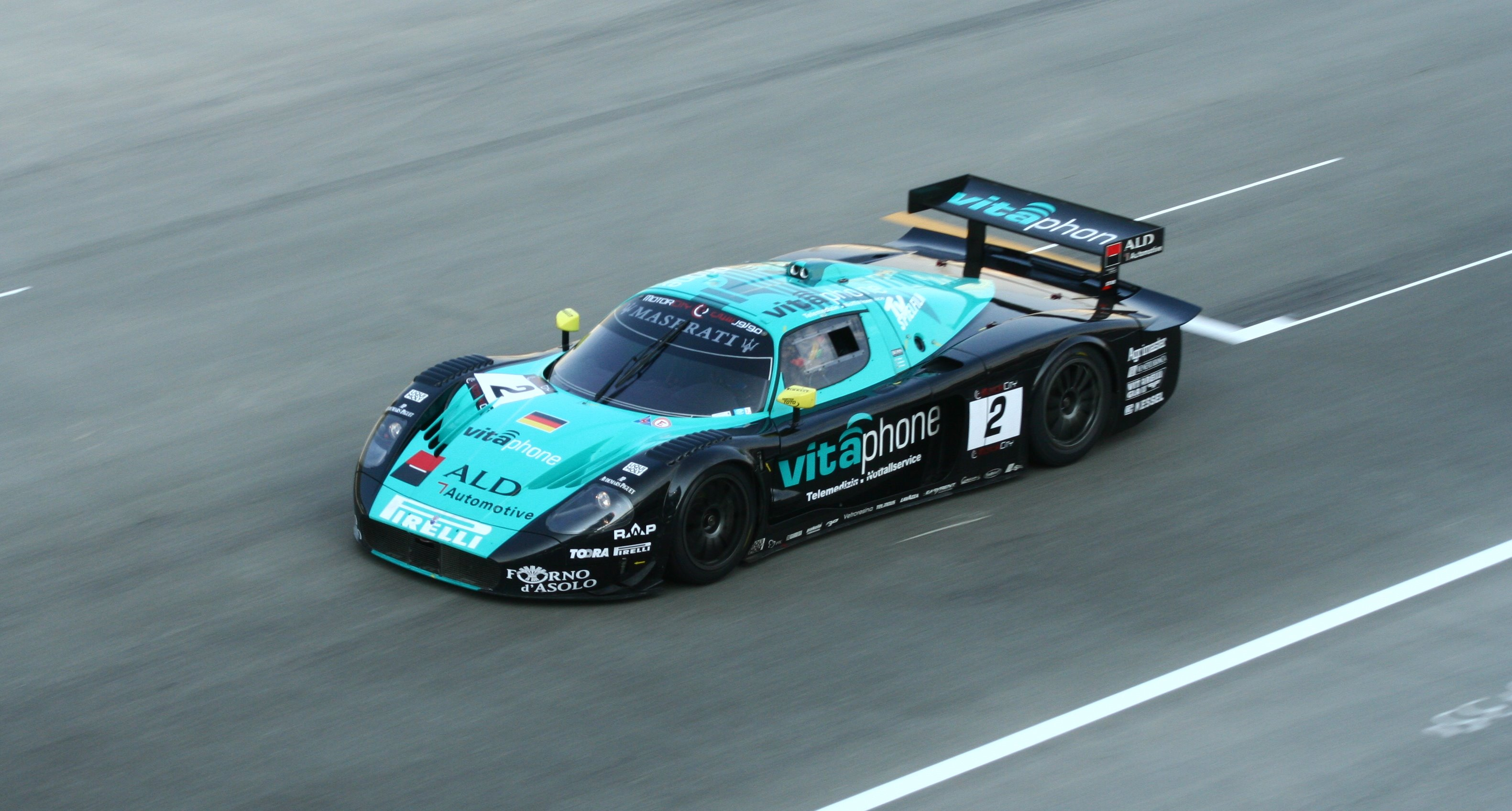
The Maserati MC12 was the dominant car in the category from its full-season debut in 2005, clinching three drivers championships and five teams championships from 2005 to 2009. It would later earn the drivers and teams title in the 2010 FIA GT1 World Championship

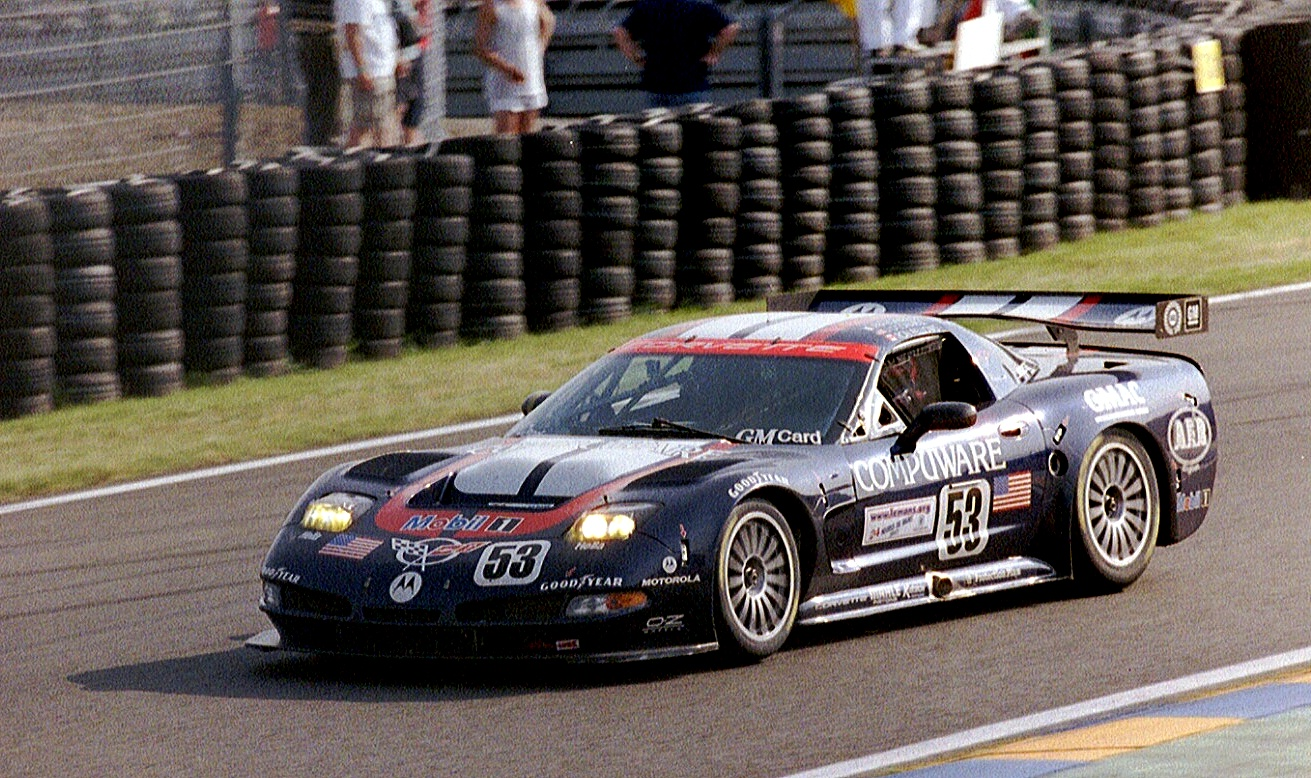
The dominant Chevrolet Corvette C5-R, which clinched four straight teams championships and three drivers championships (2001–2004)

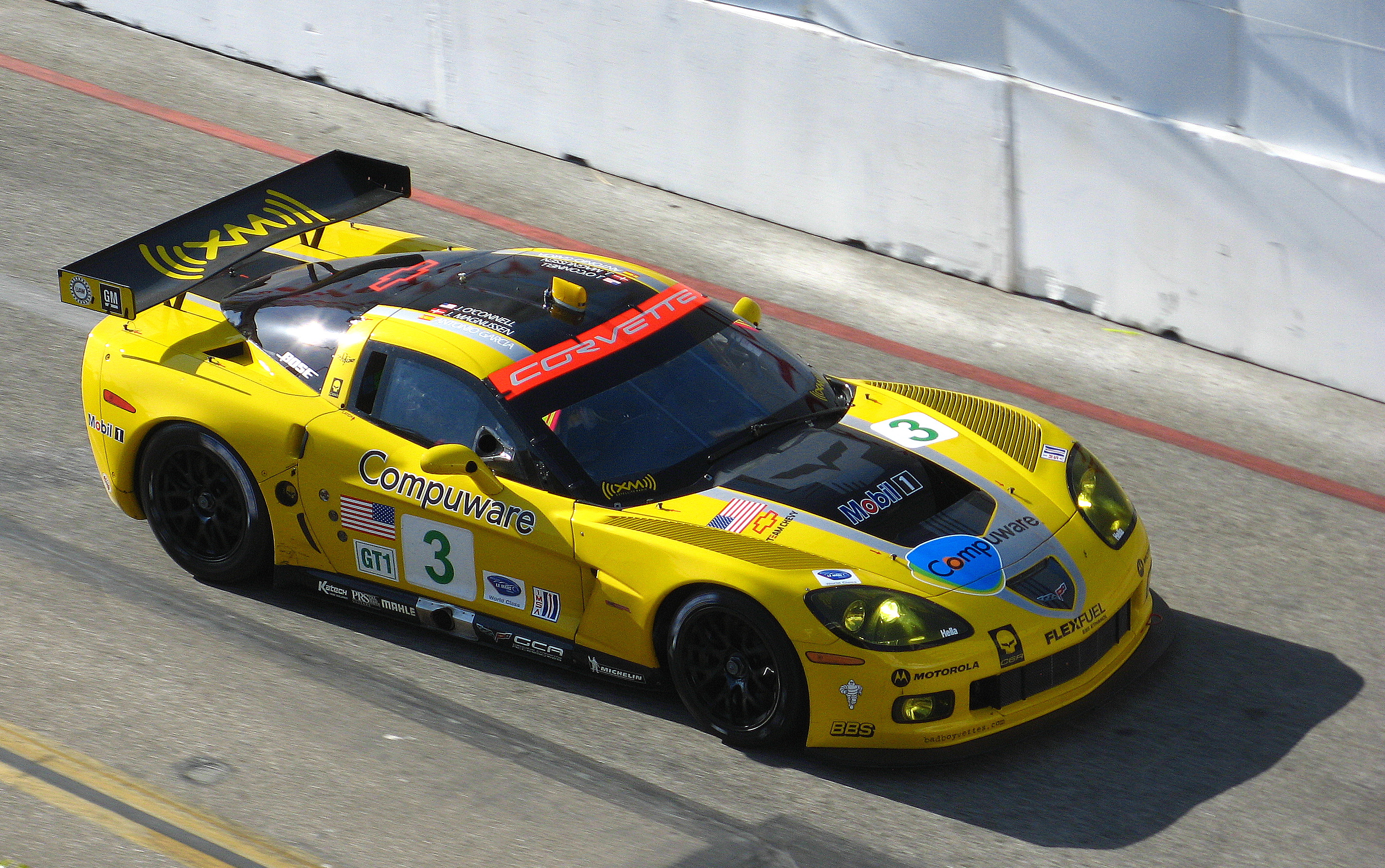
The dominant Chevrolet Corvette C6.R, which won four teams' and driver's championships in the ALMS from 2005–2008

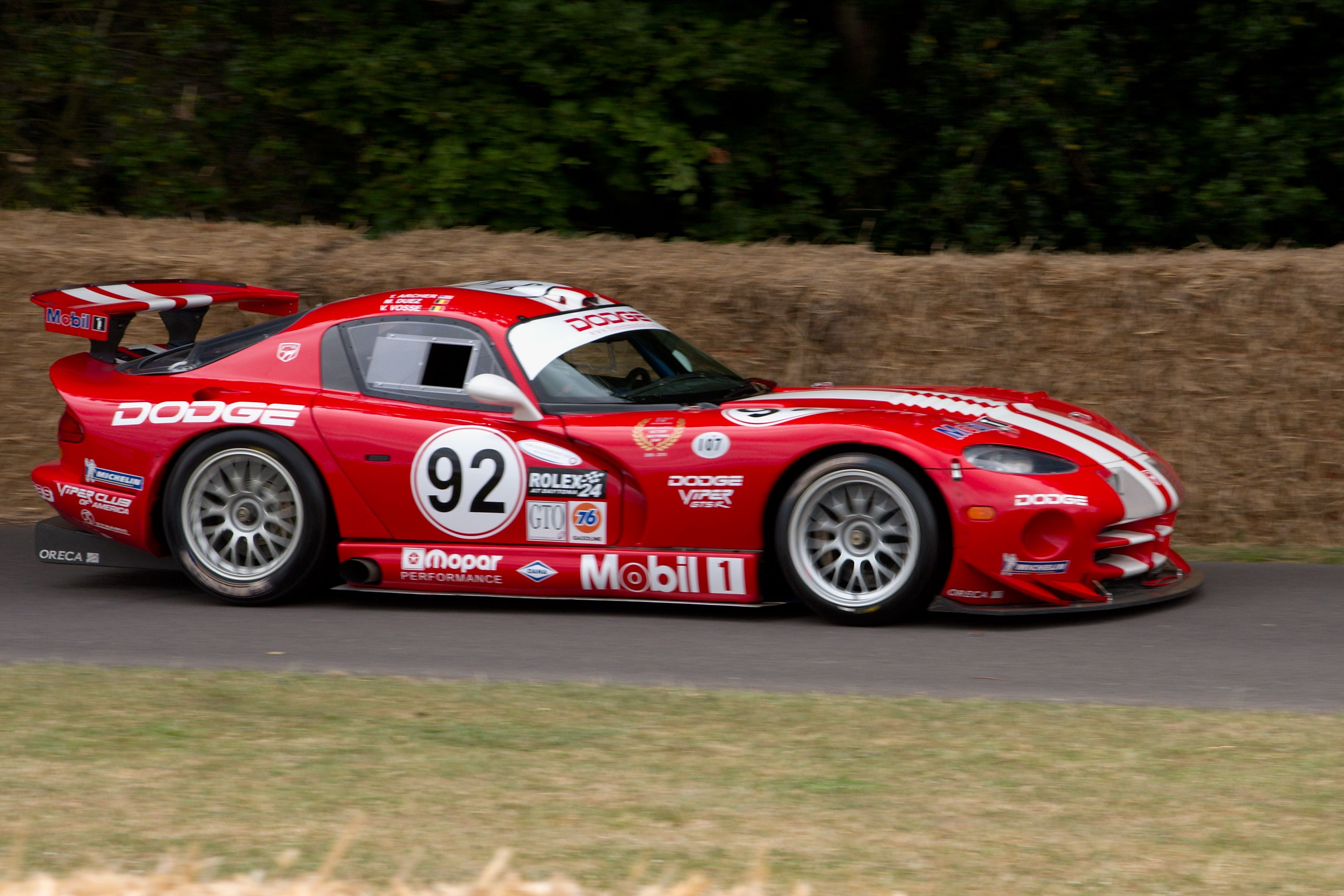
The Dodge Viper GTS-R, which won two straight championships in the ALMS from 1999 to 2000

Following the omission of the original GT1 category in the 1999 season, the FIA GT Championship was restructured, such that original GT2 class would be elevated to the top class of the championship, and become known as GT while a new class, N-GT would be the lower class in the championship. The equivalent of this in ACO sanctioned Championships would be the GTS class, and the GT class. In 2005, both classes would become renamed as "GT1" and "GT2" respectively. The Maserati MC12 would be the dominant car of this era, with it earning five consecutive teams titles from 2006 to 2009 for the Vitaphone Racing Team in the FIA GT Championship.

== List of FIA GT1 cars ==
1995–1998 Group GT1
Homologation	Manufacturer	Model	Image	Date	Notes
GT1-001	McLaren	F1 GTR		January 1995	Includes 1996 and 1997 upgrades. Originally homologated as GT-1 before renumbered as GT1-1.
GT1-002	Jaguar	XJ220 GT		January 1996	
GT1-003	Porsche	911 GT1		March 1997	Includes 911 GT1 Evolution variant.
GT1-004	Panoz	GTR-1		April 1997	
GT1-005	Mercedes-Benz	CLK GTR		April 1997	
GT1-006	Lotus	Elise GT1 Turbo		April 1997	
GT1-007	Lotus	Elise GT1		April 1997	
GT1-008	Lamborghini	Diablo 132 GT1		April 1998	
GT1-009	Porsche	911 GT1-98		April 1998	
GT1-010	Bitter	GT1		April 1998	
GT1-011	Mercedes-Benz	CLK LM		July 1998	

1995–1999 Group GT2 2000–2004 Group GT
Homologation	Manufacturer	Model	Image	Date	Notes
GT2-001	Jaguar	XJ220		April 1995	
GT2-002	Porsche	911 Carrera RS 3.8		August 1995	964-generation 911
GT2-003	Porsche	911 Turbo GT2		January 1996	993-generation 911
GT2-004	Porsche	911 Carrera RS 3.8		April 1996	993-generation 911
GT2-005	Chrysler	Viper GTS-R		April 1996	
GT2-006	Saleen	Mustang SR		April 1997	
GT2-007	Renault Sport	Spider		May 1997	
GT-008	Lister	Storm GT		April 1999	Originally homologated as GT2-8 before being renumbered as GT-008.
GT-009	Porsche	911 GT3 Cup		April 1999	Originally homologated as GT2-9 before being renumbered as GT-009. 996-generation 911.
GT-010	Marcos	Mantara LM600		June 1999	Originally homologated as GT2-10 before being renumbered as GT-010.
GT-011	Ferrari	F50		August 1999	Originally homologated as GT2-11 before being renumbered as GT-011.
GT-012	Maserati	3200 GT		April 2002	
GT-013	Saleen	S7R		April 2003	
GT-014	Ferrari	575-GTC Competizione		October 2003	
GT-015	Lamborghini	Murciélago R-GT		April 2004	
GT-016	Aston Martin	DBR9		June 2004	
GT-017	Maserati	MC12 GT1		November 2004	

2005–2012 Group GT1
Homologation	Manufacturer	Model	Image	Date	Notes
GT1-001	Saleen	S7R		May 2006	Redesigned variant of the S7R based on S7 Twin Turbo.
GT1-002	Chevrolet	Corvette C6.R		May 2006	
GT1-003	Nissan	GT-R GT1		May 2009	
GT1-101	Nissan	GT-R GT1		April 2010	Redesigned variant of the GT-R GT1.
GT1-102	Lamborghini	Murciélago LP 670 R-SV		April 2010	
GT1-103	Ford	GT1		April 2010	
