= Lotus Esprit GT1 =

Overview
- Manufacturer: Lotus Engineering
- Production: 3 units produced
- Model years: 1996
- Assembly: Hethel, Norfolk, England
- Designer: Julian Thomson

Body and chassis
- Class: Sports car
- Body style: 2-door coupé
- Related: Lotus Esprit V8

Powertrain
- Engine: 3.5 L type 918 twin-turbo V8
- Transmission: 6-speed Hewland sequential manual

Dimensions
- Wheelbase: 2,440 mm (96 in)
- Length: 4,300 mm (169 in)
- Width: 1,950 mm (77 in)
- Height: 1,100 mm (43 in)
- Kerb weight: 900 kg (1,984 lb)

Chronology
- Successor: Lotus Elise GT1

The Lotus Esprit GT1 (codenamed type 114) was a sports racing car produced by Lotus Engineering, a subsidiary of Lotus Cars formed to develop racing cars to compete in the GT1 class racing. It competed in the BPR Global GT Series in the mid-1990s.

== Background and development ==
The early 1990s was particularly difficult for Group Lotus, as the repercussions of global recession were severe for all sports car manufacturers. During 1992 the Lotus dealer franchise network contracted from 29 to 19 outlets, as production of the long-running Excel and recently relaunched Elan M100 ended. Furthermore, by August 1993 General Motors had disposed of the company.

In addition, although Team Lotus had remained independent from Group Lotus since 1954, its fortunes in Formula One would mirror those of the production side. With its bankruptcy in 1994, Lotus were left without any motorsport programme and production exclusively concentrated on the Esprit. It was apparent that single model production could not be sustained indefinitely.

Coinciding with the decline in Lotus's fortunes were the performance of the Type 105 and 106 (X180R) cars in the Sports Car Club of America (SCCA) Escort World Challenge between 1991 and 1992. These performances were an invaluable tool for Lotus's North American Marketing. The kudos of owning a proven race winner was important in securing increased sales against the established race brands of Porsche and Ferrari. Lotus’ reputation of being a manufacturer of fragile and unreliable cars had been improved with being successful in endurance racing.

The exploits of the works team was replicated by privateers in both America and Europe. Doc Bundy won the 1992 Bridgestone Supercar Championship drivers title with the Esprit X180R whilst Tom Langeberg won the Koni Production Car Series in the Netherlands. Although it was never conceived as such, the Lotus Esprit (now in the twilight of its career) was proving itself to be a credible racing car.

Having raced the Esprit in GT2 and GT3 classes, Lotus began to develop a new version of the car to race in GT1. Development of the car was entrusted to the newly formed Lotus GT1 Engineering group, which included many staff from the recently dissolved Team Lotus. The newly developed racing car utilised the type 114 steel tubular chassis paired with a body of the Esprit S4 made entirely from carbon fibre. Lotus’ expertise and investment helped modify the 3.5 litre type 918 V8 engine to produce 550 hp (410 kW). This power was transmitted through a six-speed Hewland TGT200 sequential manual gearbox. The final car weighed just over 900 kg. Accompanying the factory support was the involvement of elements of the now defunct Team Lotus. For example, Lotus Engineering was based at the former headquarters of Team Lotus (Ketteringham Hall) and included Alex Zanardi in the driver line-up. The Type 114 benefited from Formula One expertise of Team Lotus and included improved aerodynamics and data-acquisition systems.

== Performance ==
The Lotus Esprit GT1 utilised the 3.5 L type 918 twin-turbo V8 engine of then newly launched Lotus Esprit V8. The engine was extensively reworked with the addition of one Garrett T4 turbocharger, a flat plane crankshaft, forged aluminium pistons, multipoint fuel injection and an air-to-air intercooler. All of these modifications increased the power to 550 hp (410 kW) at 5400 rpm and 535 lb⋅ft (726 N⋅m) of torque at 3600 rpm. The problematic Renault 5-speed gearbox was replaced by the new 6-speed Hewland sequential manual transmission resulting in better gear shifts. The car could accelerate from 0–60 mph (97 km/h) in 3.8 seconds and had a top speed in excess of 190 mph (306 km/h). The front suspension now had upper and lower A-arms, while at the rear were upper and lower lateral links paired with upper and lower trailing links. Brakes were AP Racing carbon-ceramic discs with 6-piston callipers at the front and the rear, and Penske triple-adjustable gas-pressurised shock absorbers were used at all four wheels with the tires being provided by Michelin. The chassis was similar to the production Esprit but with a roll-cage that added stiffness. Weight was down to 900 kg (1,984.2 lb). The car faced reliability issues during its career and was eventually retired from racing.

== Racing history ==
The success of the Type 114 in the GT2 category gave Lotus the confidence to compete in the prestigious GT1 series the following season. In 1995, Lotus Engineering was formed using core personnel from the recently closed Lotus Formula One team. The new team's sole purpose was to design and develop a dedicated GT1 version of the Lotus Esprit V8 and to compete with them in the 1996 BPR Global GT series, with a future view to competing at the 24 hours of LeMans race. The GT1 hardly shared any components with the road-going Esprit. The silhouette was very similar to the road car but aside from rear light lenses, exterior door handles and badges virtually all else was either purpose made or were dedicated race components. Aesthetically the production model had been refreshed by new head of design Julian Thompson and relaunched as the S4 in 1993. These design alternations were incorporated as part of a wider package of aerodynamic improvements that included a carbon fibre splitter, diffuser and revised floor. Lotus also took the opportunity to include its new 3,506 cc (214 cu in) V8 engine which combined with one Garrett intercooled turbocharger was able to produce 550bhp. These improvements allowed the Type 114 to compete in the prestigious GT1 category. The new car debuted for the 1996 GT Series at the Circuit Paul Ricard, however, its retirement with a fractured exhaust highlighted the fragility that would persist throughout the season. Unfortunately it soon became apparent that to be successful in the GT1 category required similar budgets and development schedule of the Porsche, McLaren and Mercedes teams.

The improvements to the 114 did not match its stunning debut season, although its presence at international sportscar races helped to sell over 250 V8 Esprits in 1996. There were a number of reasons that account for the second generation Type 114's relative failure in sportscar racing. Firstly the Esprit had been in production for 21 years and, despite the design being continually refreshed, it still retained some fundamental drawbacks. For example, its wide flat screen rendered it aerodynamically inferior to the McLaren F1s and Porsche 911s that it was competing against. Also the previous season's Lotus type 900-derived engine had been in production and progressively improved over twenty three years. The inclusion of the new V8 required development work by Lotus Racing and Lotus Engineering, arguably making the type 114 a test bed for the Type 115 that was to replace it but the newly developed Hewland gearbox proved to be problematic and eventually led to the car's demise. Ironically the Type 115 would abandon this engine in preference for the Chevrolet LT5-based engine that Lotus had originally designed.

Three cars were built: chassis 114–001, 114-002 and 114–003. Two cars debuted at the 1996 BPR Global GT Series 4 Hours of Donington. Reliability dogged the car throughout the year and it was succeeded by the Type 115 Elise GT1 the next year. Two of the Esprit GT1s were converted to GT2. Chassis 114-001 was acquired by Mike Haines Racing, who developed it into a competitive GT2 car. Chassis 114-001 now resides in a private museum in Tokyo, Japan. Chassis 114-002 was damaged at Oulton Park and became a parts donor for the remaining cars. Chassis 114-003 was destroyed in a fire.

Ultimately it would be Lotus' characteristic literal rule interpretation that would end the works involvement on the Esprit's racing career. During 1996 the FIA GT rules concerning homologation requirements were changed in an attempt to alter the emphasis of the series from sports to racing cars. Indeed, only a single production car needed to be manufactured. Therefore, as manufacturers such as McLaren produced their F1 GTR 97, Lotus took the opportunity to showcase the recently launched Elise and concentrate efforts on running the Lotus Elise GT1 (Type 115) model in the 1997 season.
