= Andrea Boldrini =

Italian racing driver

- Nationality: (Italy) Italian
- Born: 10 July 1971 (age 55) Milan, Italy

Championship titles
- 1996: Italian Formula Three Championship

Andrea Boldrini (born 10 July 1971 in Milan) is an Italian racing driver. He has competed in such series as International Formula 3000, Formula Nippon, Porsche Supercup and the FIA GT Championship. He won the Italian Formula Three Championship in 1996.

Sporting positions
Preceded by Luca Rangoni	Italian Formula Three Champion; 1996	Succeeded by Oliver Martini
Preceded by Inaugural	Porsche Carrera Cup Italy; Champion; 2008	Succeeded by Luigi Ferrara
