= Pagani Utopia =

Mid-engine sports car by Pagani

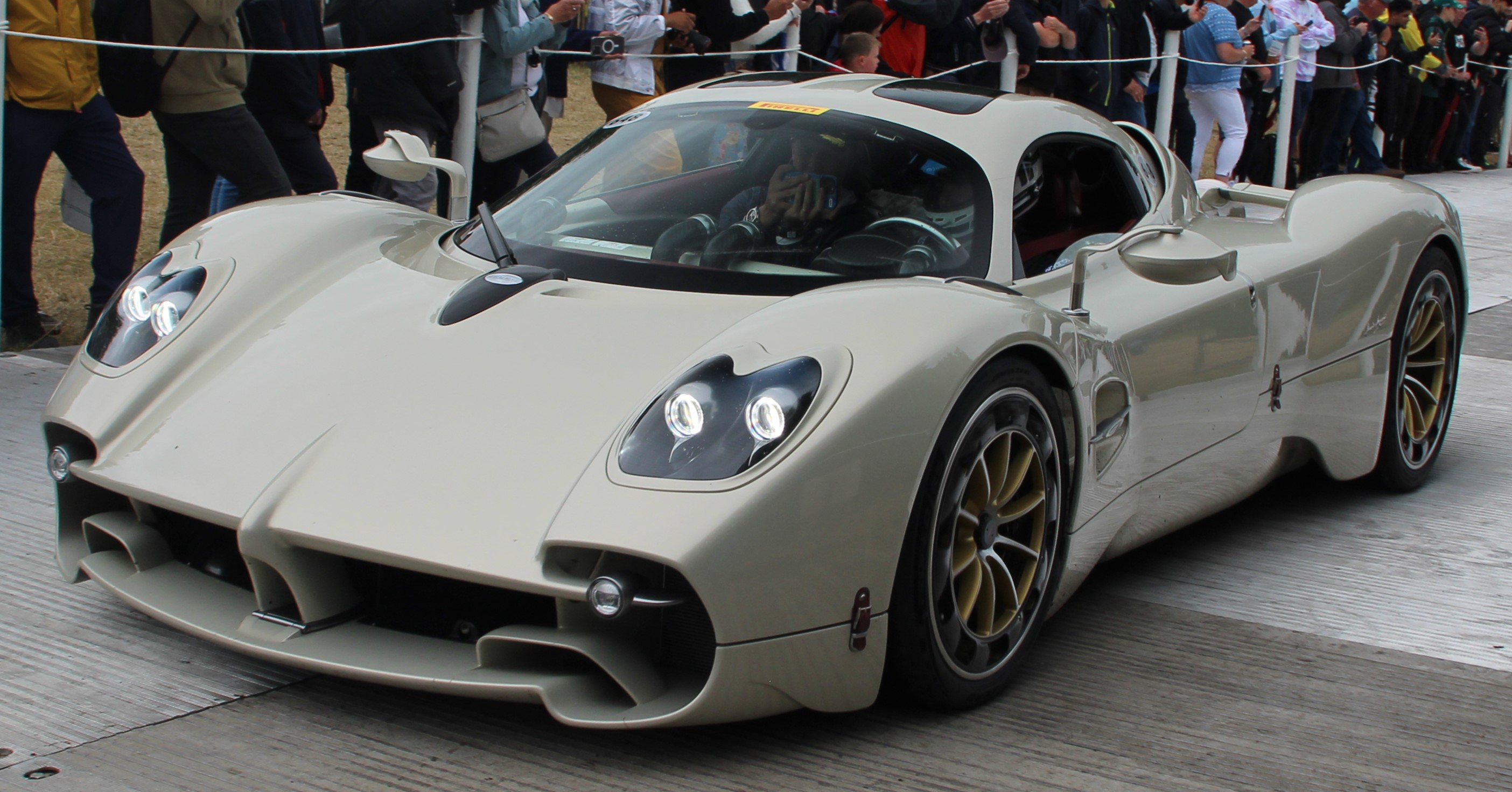

Overview
- Manufacturer: Pagani Automobili
- Model code: C10
- Production: 2022–present
- Assembly: Italy: San Cesario sul Panaro
- Designer: Horacio Pagani

Body and chassis
- Class: Sports car (S)
- Body style: 2-door berlinetta 2-door roadster
- Layout: Rear mid-engine, rear-wheel-drive
- Doors: Butterfly

Powertrain
- Engine: 5.98 L (364.9 cu in) Mercedes-AMG M158 twin-turbo V12
- Power output: 864 PS (635 kW; 852 hp)
- Transmission: 7-speed Xtrac manual 7-speed Xtrac automated manual

Dimensions
- Wheelbase: 2,794 mm (110.0 in)
- Length: 4,597 mm (181.0 in)
- Width: 2,037 mm (80.2 in)
- Height: 1,169 mm (46.0 in)
- Curb weight: 1,280 kg (2,822 lb) (dry)

Chronology
- Predecessor: Pagani Huayra

The Pagani Utopia is a mid-engine sports car produced by the Italian manufacturer Pagani Automobili. It was developed under the 'C10' codename and presented on 12 September 2022 at the Teatro Lirico in Milan. It is Pagani's third car model, superseding the Huayra, with more power and a manual gearbox option. The internal model code is C10; succeeding the C8 (Zonda) and C9 (Huayra).

A roadster version, the Utopia Roadster, was introduced on 30 July 2024 with production limited to 130 units.

== Development ==
The Pagani Utopia was developed over the period of over six years and utilised eight complete prototypes. Three of those prototypes were dedicated to engine testing that lasted about two years. A total of twelve scale models were made: ten at 1:5 scale and two 1:1 scale models.

== Specifications ==
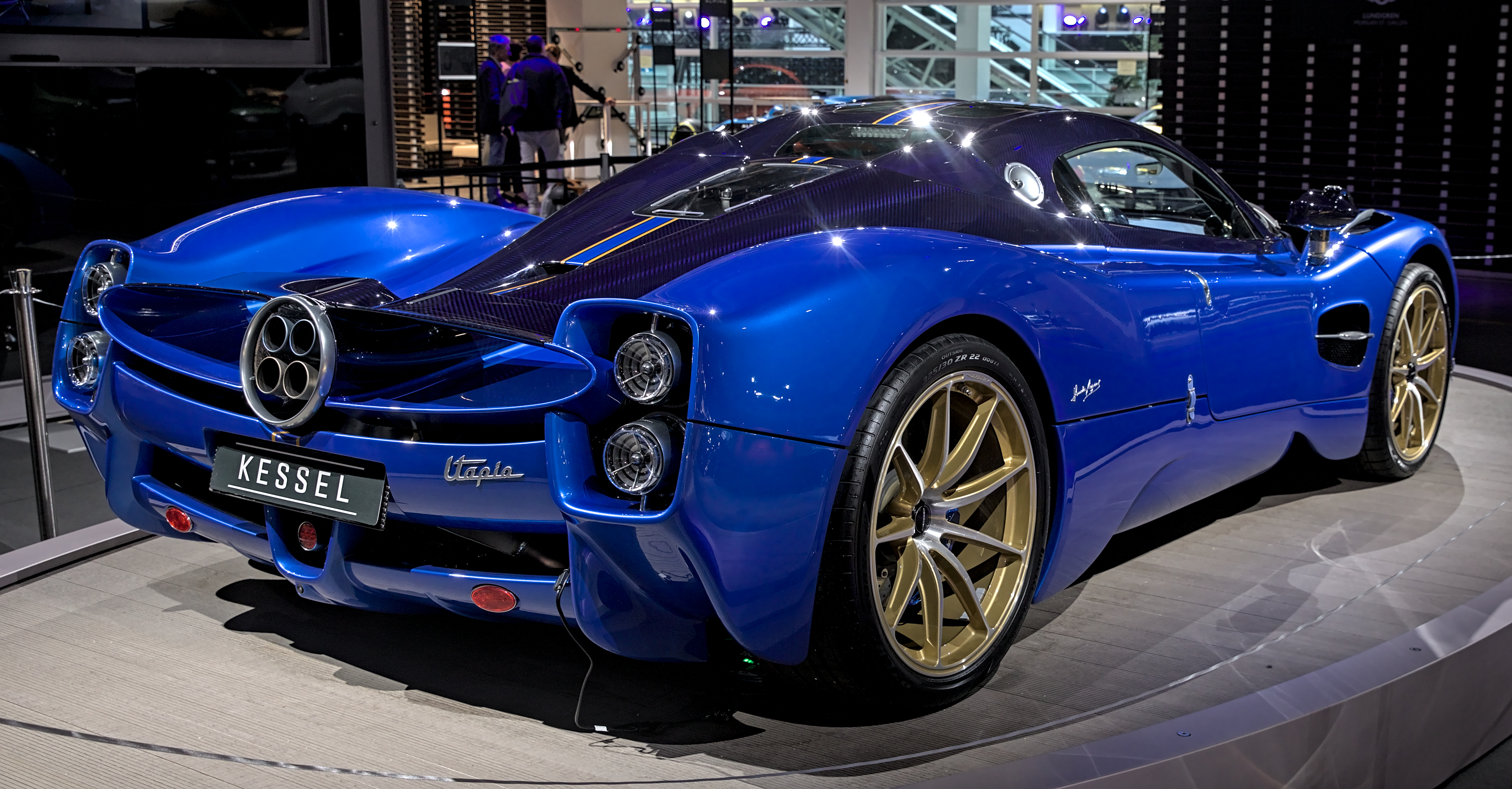
Rear view

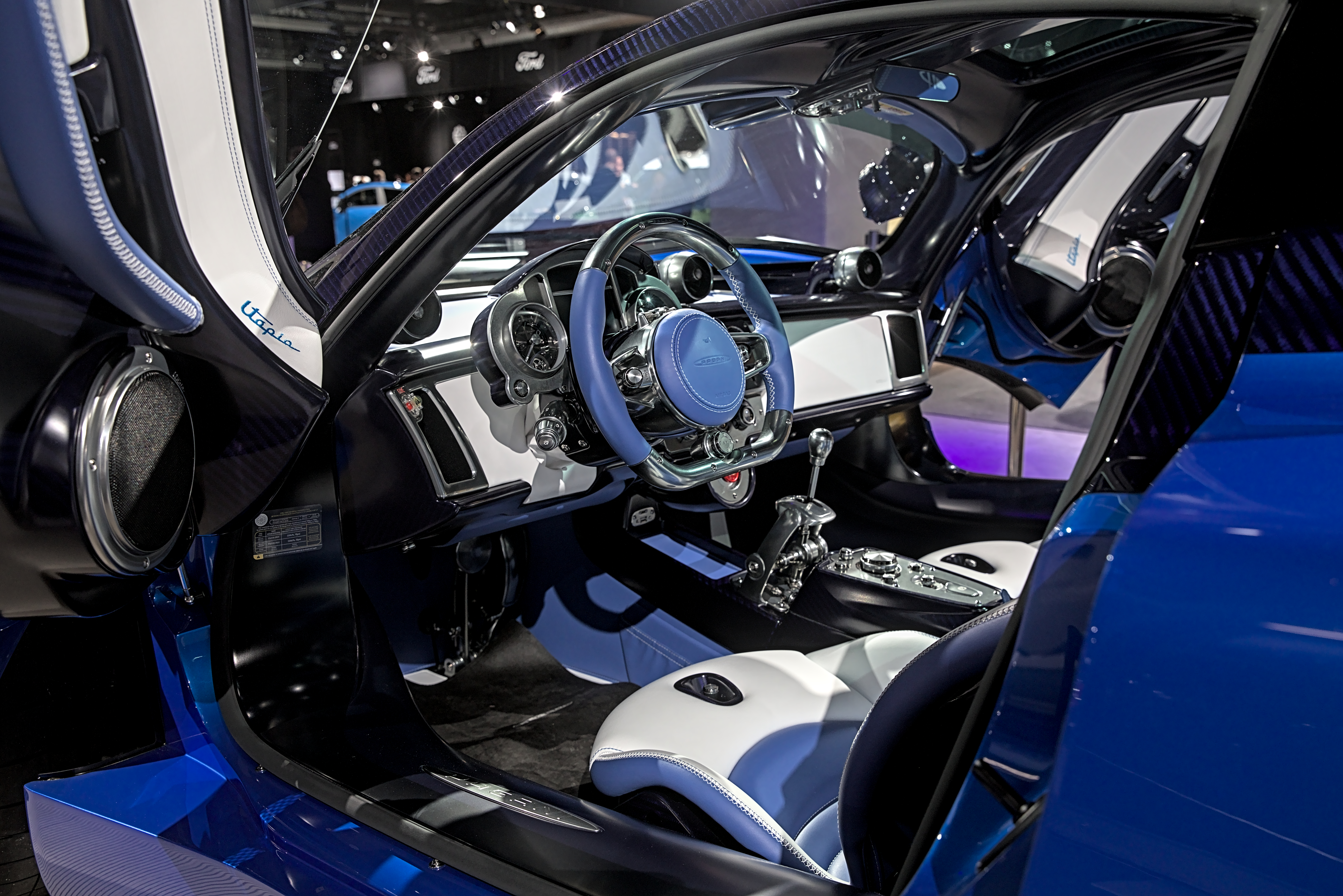
Interior

The Utopia's forged aluminium double wishbone suspension was based on experience gathered throughout the track-only Huayra R's development. The M158 twin-turbocharged V12 engine, designed and built by Mercedes-AMG, now develops 864 PS (635 kW; 852 hp) at 6000 rpm and 1,100 N⋅m (811 lb⋅ft) of torque available between 2800 and 5900 rpm. The engine weighs 262 kg (578 lb) dry. Pagani partnered with Xtrac to develop a 7-speed gearbox that is mounted transversally and is available as pure manual or an automated manual, and coupled with an electro-mechanical differential by a triple plate clutch.

== Production ==
Excluding the 8 coupé prototypes, a total of 99 examples of the closed coupé model are planned, with possible future track variants. All 99 coupés are already assigned to the customers. The first car was delivered in October 2023. The Utopia starts at 2.19 million USD.

On July 30, 2024, Pagani introduced the Utopia Roadster. The Utopia Roadster has a removable carbon-fibre hard-top cover and a removable soft-top. The car retained the coupé powertrain with the same technical specifications. The base price of the Utopia Roadster starts at 3.4 million USD.

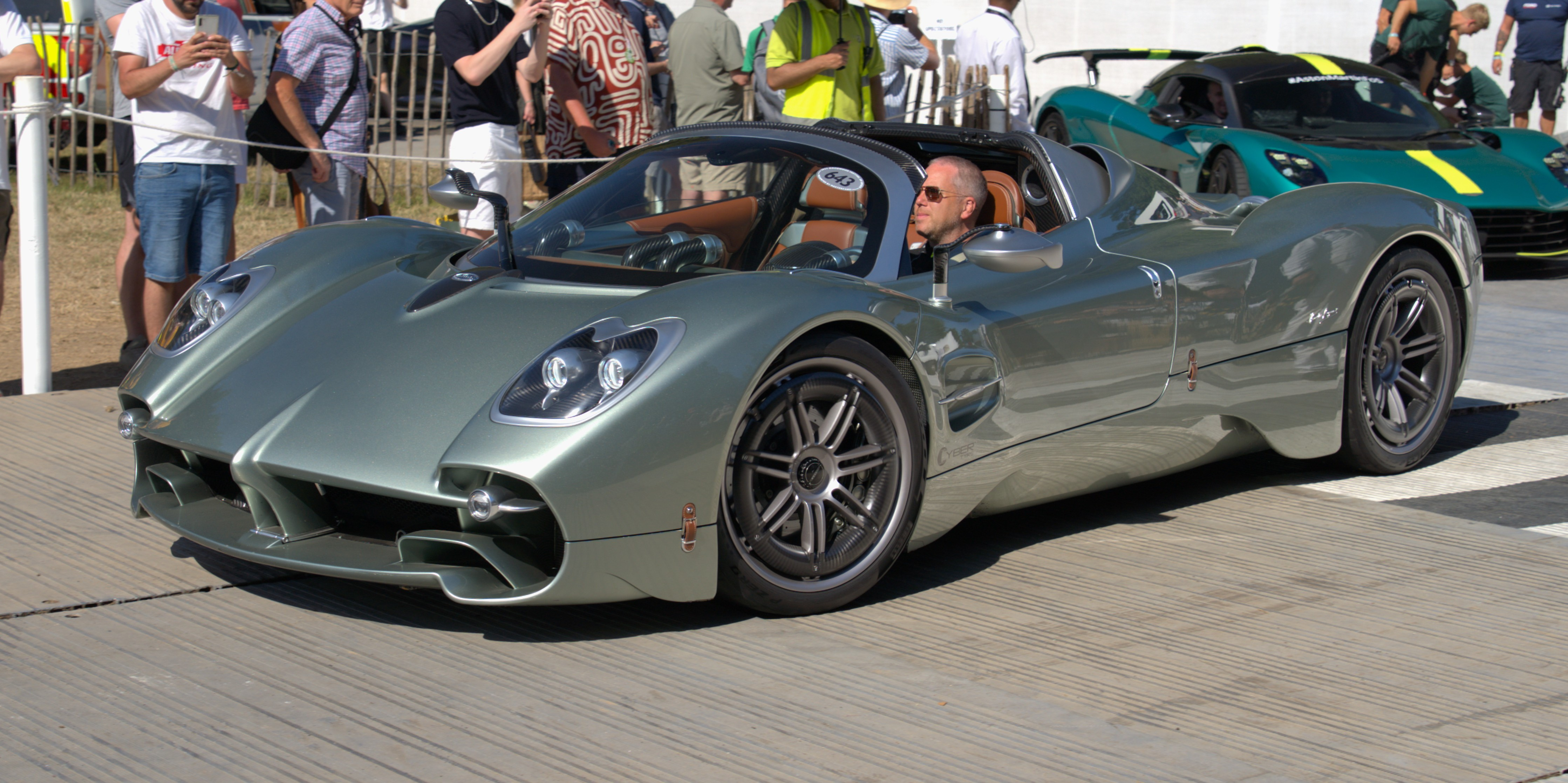
Utopia Roadster

Production of the Utopia Roadster will be limited to 130 units.
