= Reinforced carbon–carbon =

Graphite-based composite for ultra-high temperature applications

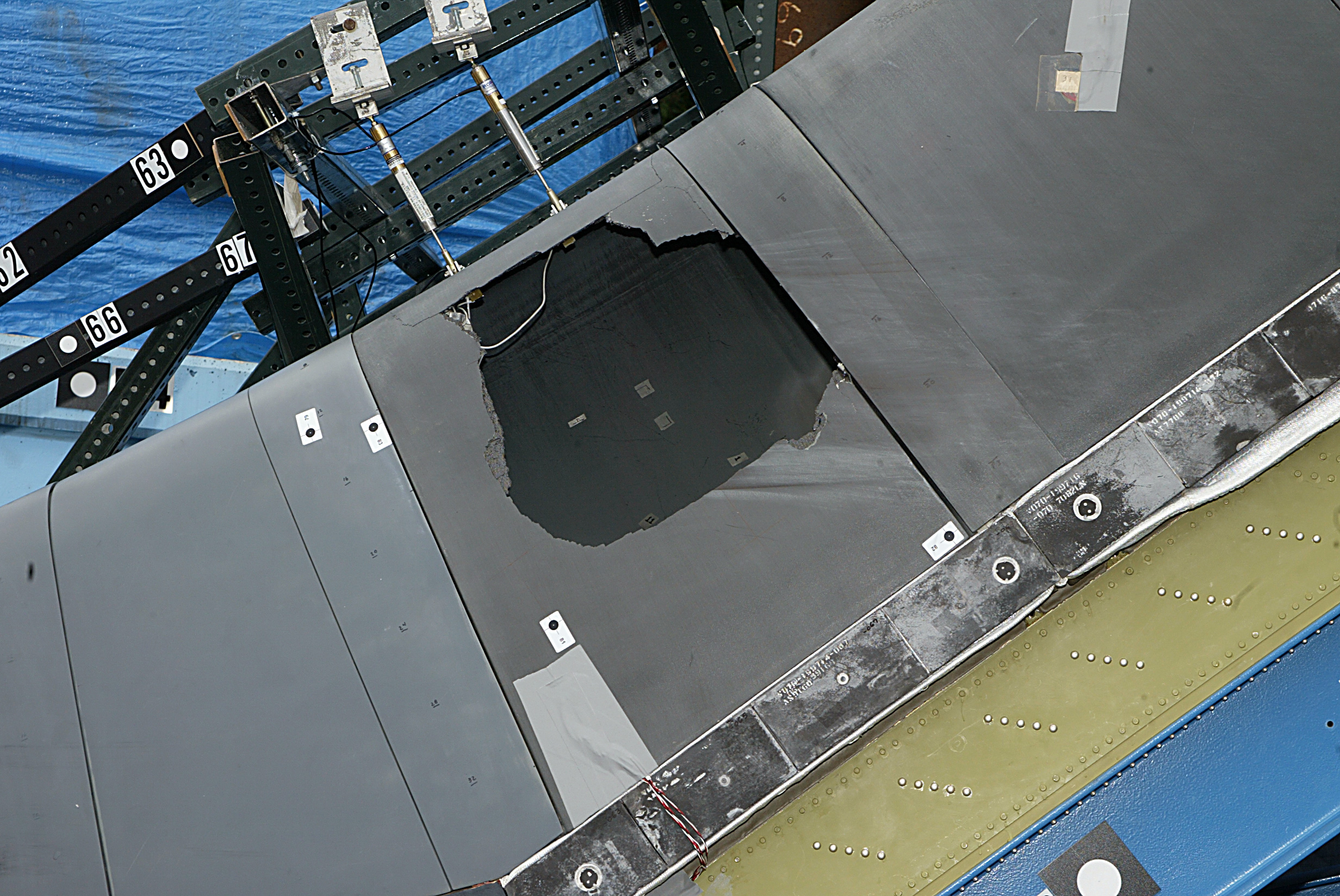
Pieces of reinforced carbon–carbon including a panel removed from the wing of Space Shuttle Atlantis, showing brittle failure of C/C due to foam impact reproducing a possible event during Columbia's final launch.

Carbon fibre reinforced carbon (Note: Variously hyphenated "carbon fibre reinforced carbon", "carbon-fibre-reinforced carbon", or "carbon fibre-reinforced carbon"; while "carbon fibre" is also spelled "carbon fiber".) (CFRC), carbon–carbon (C/C), or reinforced carbon–carbon (RCC) is a composite material consisting of carbon fiber reinforcement in a matrix of graphite. It was developed for the reentry vehicles of intercontinental ballistic missiles, and is most widely known as the material for the nose cone and wing leading edges of the Space Shuttle orbiter. Carbon-carbon brake discs and brake pads have been the standard component of the brake systems of Formula One racing cars since the late 1970s; the first year carbon brakes were seen on a Formula One car was 1976.

Carbon–carbon is well-suited to structural applications at high temperatures, or where thermal shock resistance and/or a low coefficient of thermal expansion is needed. While it is less brittle than many other ceramics, it lacks impact resistance; Space Shuttle Columbia was destroyed during atmospheric re-entry after one of its RCC panels was broken by the impact of a piece of polyurethane foam insulation that broke off from the External Tank.

== Production ==
The material is made in three stages:

First, material is laid up in its intended final shape, with carbon filament and/or cloth surrounded by an organic binder such as plastic or pitch. Often, coke or some other fine carbon aggregate is added to the binder mixture.

Second, the lay-up is heated, so that pyrolysis transforms the binder to relatively pure carbon. The binder loses volume in the process, causing voids to form; the addition of aggregate reduces this problem, but does not eliminate it.

Third, the voids are gradually filled by forcing a carbon-forming gas such as acetylene through the material at a high temperature, over the course of several days. This long heat treatment process also allows the carbon to form into larger graphite crystals, and is the major reason for the material's high cost. The gray "Reinforced Carbon–Carbon (RCC)" panels on the space shuttle's wing leading edges and nose cone cost NASA $100,000/sq ft to produce, although much of this cost was a result of the advanced geometry and research costs associated with the panels. This stage can also include manufacturing of the finished product.

C/C is a hard material that can be made highly resistant to thermal expansion, temperature gradients, and thermal cycling, depending on how the fiber scaffold is laid up and the quality/density of the matrix filler. Carbon–carbon materials retain their properties above 2000 °C. This temperature may be exceeded with the help of protective coatings to prevent oxidation. The material has a density between 1.6 and 1.98 g/cm^{3}.

== Similar products ==
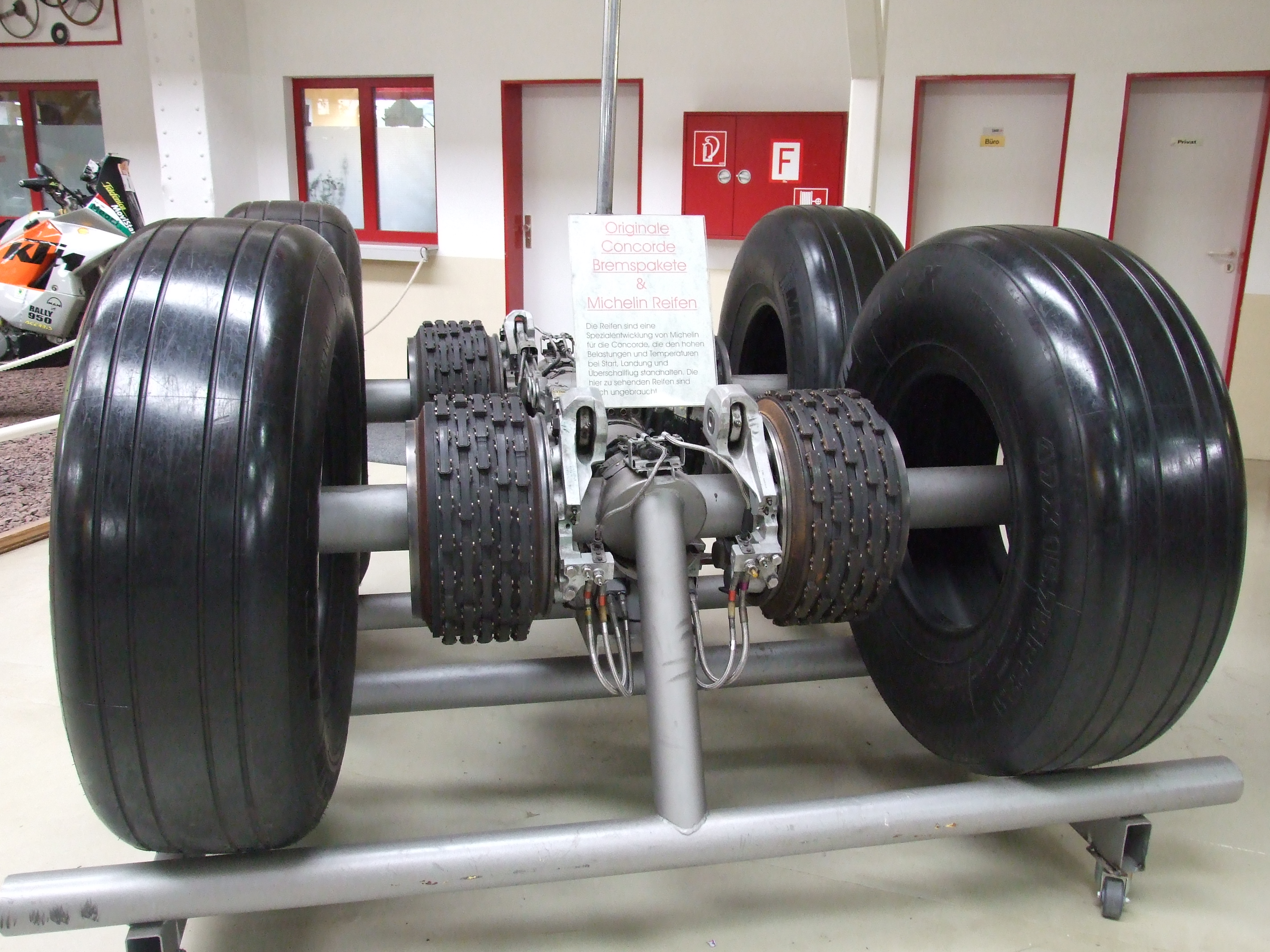
The Dunlop carbon brakes as used on the Concorde airliner.

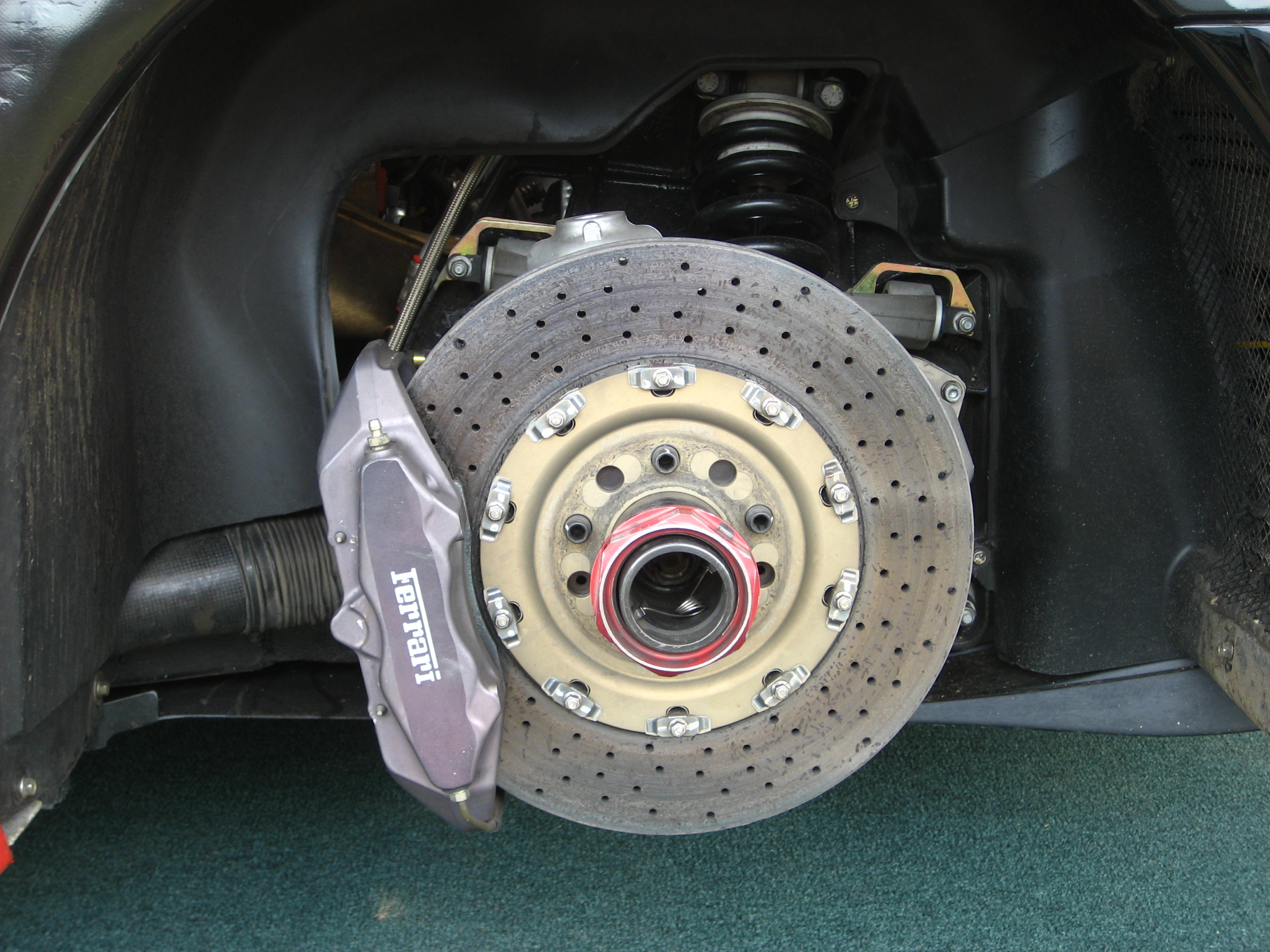
The brake disc of this Ferrari race car's braking system is made from carbon fibre-reinforced silicon carbide which is a CMC rather than a C/C

Carbon fibre-reinforced silicon carbide (C/SiC) is a development of pure carbon–carbon that uses silicon carbide with carbon fibre. It is slightly denser than pure carbon-carbon and thought to be more durable.

It can be used in the brake disc and brake pads of high-performance road cars. The first car to use it was the Mercedes-Benz C215 Coupe F1 edition. It is standard on the Bugatti Veyron and many Bentleys, Ferraris, Lamborghinis, Porsches, and the Corvette ZR1 and Z06. They are also offered as an optional upgrade on certain high performance Audi cars, including the D3 S8, B7 RS4, C6 S6 and RS6, and the R8. The material is not used in Formula 1 because of its weight.

Carbon brakes became widely available for commercial airplanes in the 1980s, having been first used on the Concorde supersonic transport.

A related non-ceramic carbon composite with uses in high-tech racing automotives is the carbotanium carbon–titanium composite used in the Zonda R and Huayra supercars made by the Italian motorcar company Pagani.
