= Caiola =

Caiola is an Italian surname. Notable people with the surname include:

- Al Caiola (1920–2016), American guitarist, composer, and arranger
- Benny Caiola (1930–2010), Italian entrepreneur
