= Benny Caiola =

Italian entrepreneur

- Born: Benny Caiola; 20 October 1930; San Fratello, Messina, Italy
- Died: 22 April 2010 (aged 79); New York City, United States
- Occupations: Real Estate Developer; Automotive collector
- Spouse: Bettina Caiola
- Children: Benny Caiola III Jr. Luigi Caiola; Alfred Caiola; Rose Caiola
- Website: CAIOLA Real Estate Group

Benny Caiola (20 October 1930 – 22 April 2010) was an Italian real estate entrepreneur known for his extensive car collection of Ferrari and other luxury automobiles.

== Personal life ==
Caiola had four children, Benny Caiola II, Luigi Caiola, Alfred Caiola, and Rose Caiola. He has 8 grandchildren from Luigi, Alfred and Rose. Their names are Benny and Sasha. Maria, Adam, and William. Anabela, Andre and Avery.

== Car collection ==
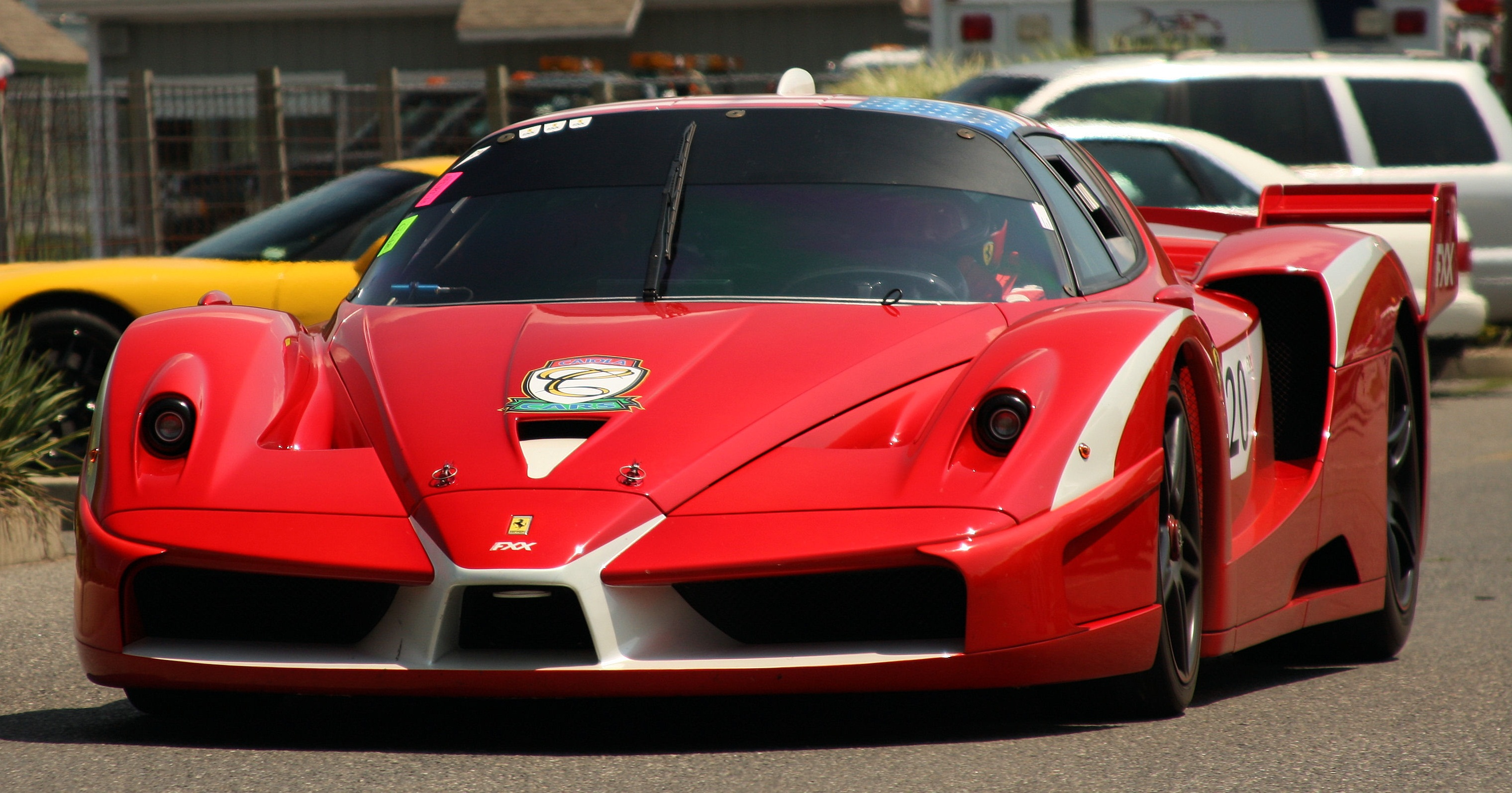
Benny Caiola's Ferrari FXX red with white accents, American flag on the roof (number 20)

Benny Caiola owned an automotive collection which, according to Forbes Magazine, was viewed as one of the most exclusive Ferrari collections worldwide. He was also the first client to ever order a car from Pagani, a reason for the company to name a special edition of their second production car, the Pagani Huayra, after his initials, making it the Huayra BC. Thirty units of the Huayra BC were produced. The car debuted at the Geneva Motor Show in 2016, almost six years after Caiola's death. At the end of July 2019 Pagani released the new Pagani Huayra Roadster BC, an open-top version of the Huayra BC.

A selection of the cars included in his collection is given below:

- 1973 Dino 246 GT
- 1990 Ferrari F40
- 1995 Ferrari F50
- 1999 Ferrari 333 SP
- 2002 Enzo Ferrari
- 2005 Maserati MC12
- 2006 Ferrari FXX Evoluzione (number 20)
- 2007 Aston Martin DBS
- 2007 Ferrari F430 Challenge
- 2008 Ferrari 430 Scuderia
- 2008 Mercedes-Benz SLR McLaren
- 2009 Lamborghini Gallardo LP 560-4
- 2010 Ferrari 599 GTB Fiorano HGTE

The collection was put on sale on December 28, 2010 at Gooding & Company.

== Pelham Manor Home ==
Caiola kept his extensive car collection in his home in Pelham Manor, New York. The total area of the house is around 2.4 acres, with a marvelous detached garage around the back of the house. The house has 6 bedrooms, as well as 7 bathrooms.

== Relationship with Pagani ==
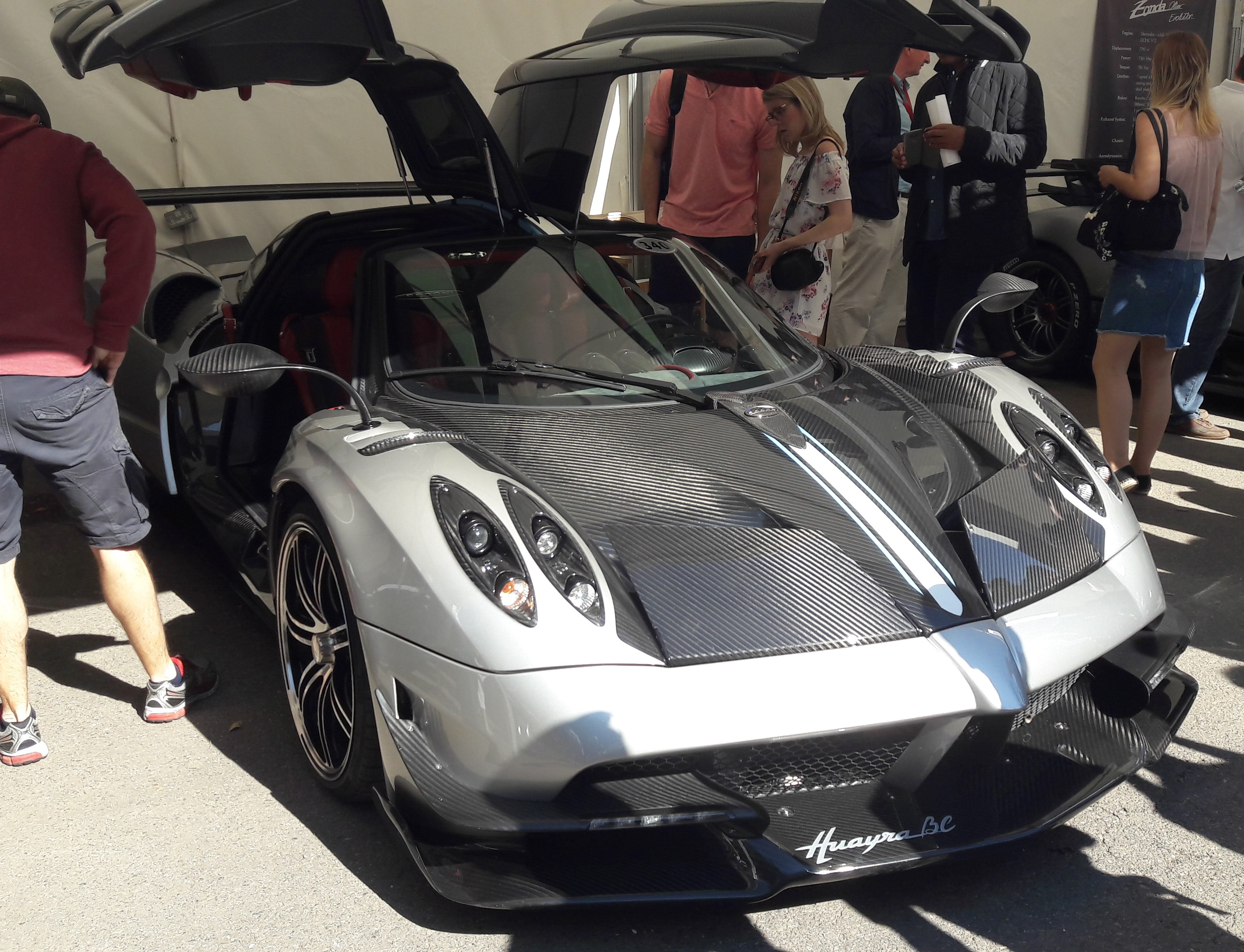
Pagani Huayra BC

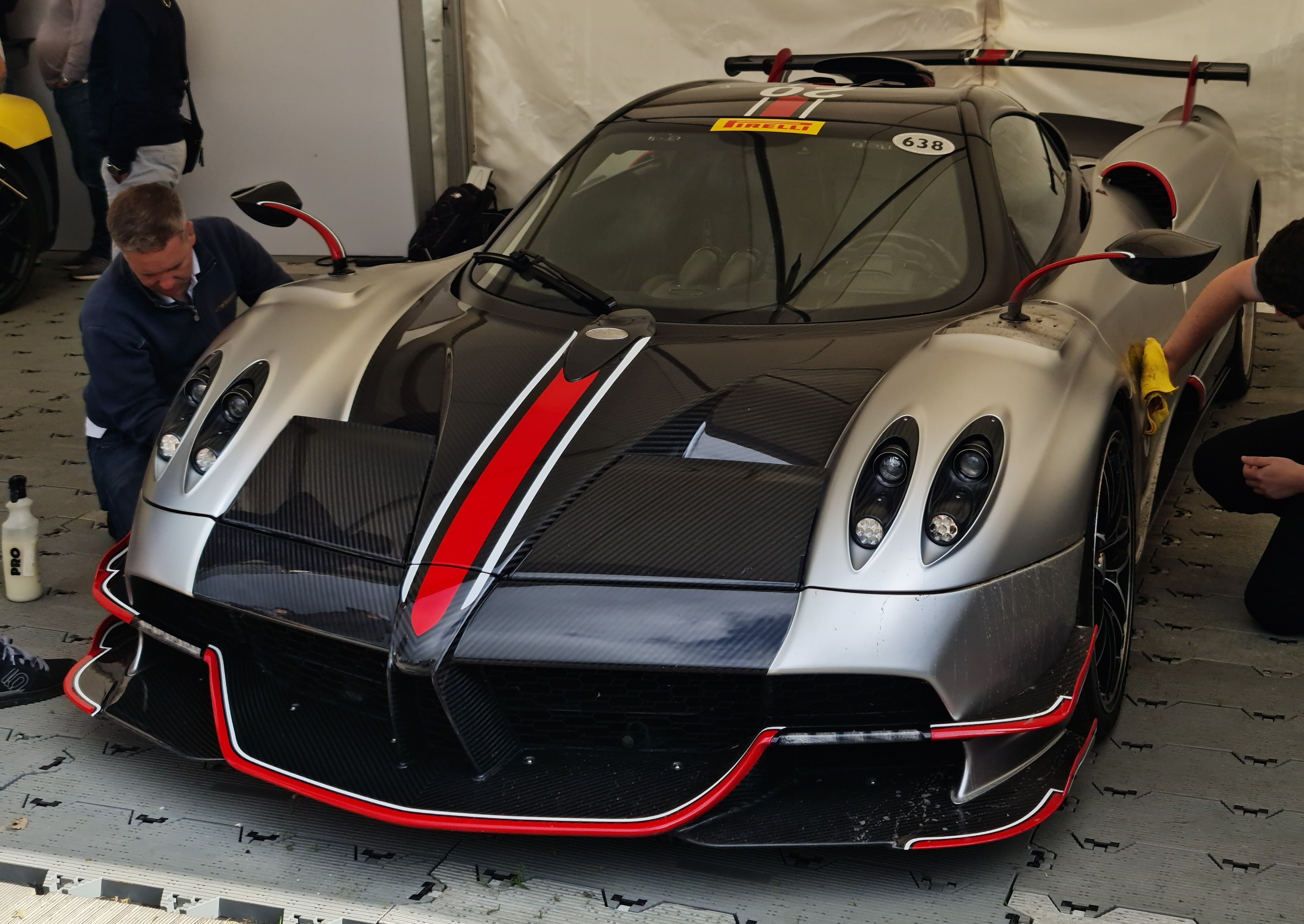
Pagani Huayra Roadster BC

Benny Caiola was a friend of Horacio Pagani, the founder of Pagani Automobili and the first customer of a Pagani Zonda, the company's first automobile.

After his death a version of the Pagani Huayra (the successor of the Zonda), named "Huayra BC" (Benny Caiola) which is a track focused variant of the original model was unveiled at the 2016 Geneva Motor Show in his honour.

Later, in July 2019, an open-top variant of the BC called the Huayra Roadster BC was unveiled.

== Death ==
Benny Caiola died in New York City on 22 April 2010, aged 79.
