= San Cesario sul Panaro =

- Comune
- Comune di San Cesario sul Panaro
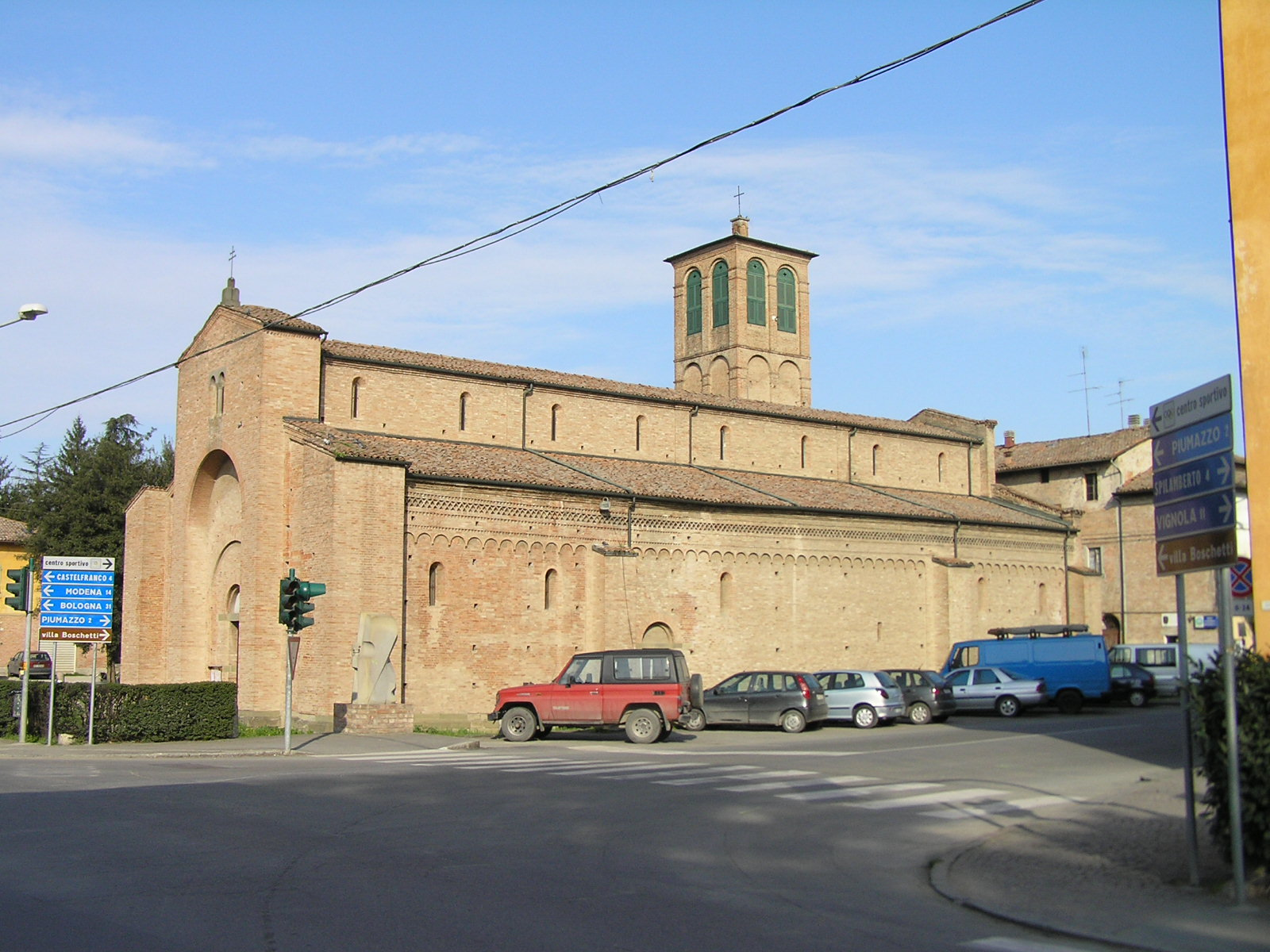
- Romanesque cathedral of San Cesario sul Panaro

- Coat of arms

- Location within Italy Location within Emilia-Romagna
- Coordinates: 44°33′41″N 11°02′02″E
- Country: Italy
- Region: Emilia-Romagna
- Province: Modena (MO)
- Frazioni: Altolà, Ponte Sant'Ambrogio, Sant'Anna

Government
  - Mayor: Francesco Zuffi

Area
  - Total: 27.4 km^{2} (10.6 sq mi)
- Highest elevation: 77 m (253 ft)
- Lowest elevation: 33 m (108 ft)

Population (31 July 2015)
  - Total: 6,412
  - Density: 234/km^{2} (606/sq mi)
- Demonym: Sancesaresi
- Time zone: UTC+1 (CET)
  - Summer (DST): UTC+2 (CEST)
- Postal code: 41018
- Dialing code: 059
- Patron saint: San Cesario
- Website: Official website

San Cesario sul Panaro (Modenese: San Gèr; Western Bolognese: San Cesèri) is a comune (municipality) in the Province of Modena in the Italian region Emilia-Romagna, located about 25 km (16 mi) northwest of Bologna and about 12 km (7 mi) southeast of Modena. Sports car manufacturer Pagani is located here. The town has a Romanesque-style church dedicated to Saint Caesarius of Terracina. It is also home of Danit.

The battle of San Cesario took place in the area in August 1229.
