= Carbon fiber reinforced polymer =

Light, strong and rigid composite material

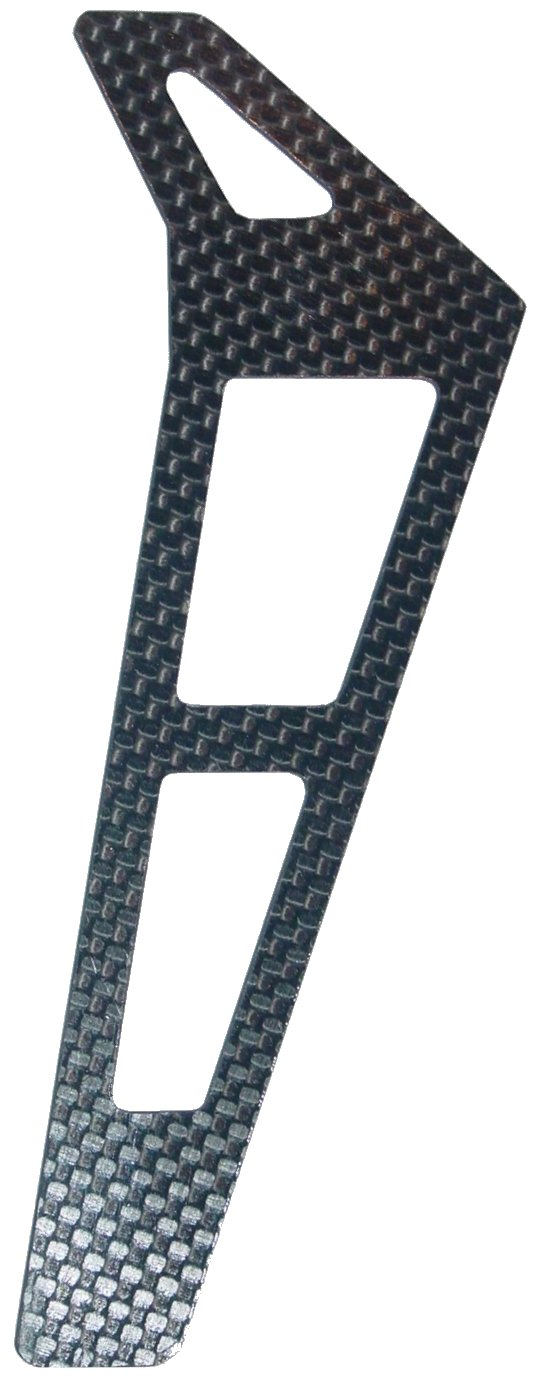
Tail of a radio-controlled helicopter, made of CFRP

Carbon fiber (or fibre) reinforced polymers (Note: also known as carbon-fiber-reinforced plastics (CFRP), carbon-fiber reinforced-thermoplastic (CFRT), carbon fiber, carbon composite, or just carbon) are extremely strong and light fiber-reinforced plastics that contain carbon fibers. CFRPs can be expensive to produce, but are commonly used wherever high strength-to-weight ratio and stiffness (rigidity) are required, such as aerospace, superstructures of ships, automotive, civil engineering, sports equipment, and an increasing number of consumer and technical applications.

The binding polymer is often a thermoset resin such as epoxy, but other thermoset or thermoplastic polymers, such as polyester, vinyl ester, or nylon, are sometimes used. The properties of the final CFRP product can be affected by the type of additives introduced to the binding matrix (resin). The most common additive is silica, but other additives such as rubber and carbon nanotubes can be used.

Carbon fiber is sometimes referred to as graphite-reinforced polymer or graphite fiber-reinforced polymer (GFRP is less common, as it clashes with glass-(fiber)-reinforced polymer).

== Properties ==
CFRP are composite materials. In this case the composite consists of two parts: a matrix and a reinforcement. In CFRP the reinforcement is carbon fiber, which provides its strength. The matrix is usually a thermosetting plastic, such as polyester resin, to bind the reinforcements together. Because CFRPs consist of two distinct elements, the material properties depend on these two elements.

Reinforcement gives CFRPs their strength and rigidity, measured by stress and elastic modulus respectively. Unlike isotropic materials like steel and aluminum, CFRPs have directional strength properties. The properties of a CFRP depend on the layouts of the carbon fiber and the proportion of the carbon fibers relative to the polymer. The two different equations governing the net elastic modulus of composite materials using the properties of the carbon fibers and the polymer matrix can also be applied to carbon fiber reinforced plastics. The rule of mixtures for the equal strain case gives:
$$E_c = V_mE_m + V_fE_f$$

which is valid for composite materials with the fibers oriented parallel to the applied load. $E_c$ is the total composite modulus, $V_m$ and $V_f$ are the volume fractions of the matrix and fiber respectively in the composite, and $E_m$ and $E_f$ are the elastic moduli of the matrix and fibers respectively. The other extreme case of the elastic modulus of the composite with the fibers oriented transverse to the applied load can be found using the inverse rule of mixtures for the equal stress case:
$$E_c = \left( \frac{V_m}{E_m} + \frac{V_f}{E_f} \right)^{-1}$$

The above equations give an upper and lower bound on the Young's modulus for CFRP and there are many other factors that influence the true value.

The fracture toughness of carbon fiber reinforced plastics is governed by multiple mechanisms:

- Debonding between the carbon fiber and polymer matrix.
- Fiber pull-out.
- Delamination between the CFRP sheets.

Typical epoxy-based CFRPs exhibit virtually no plasticity, with less than 0.5% strain to failure. Although CFRPs with epoxy have high strength and elastic modulus, the brittle fracture mechanics presents unique challenges to engineers in failure detection since failure occurs catastrophically. As such, recent efforts to toughen CFRPs include modifying the existing epoxy material and finding alternative polymer matrix. One such material with high promise is PEEK, which exhibits an order of magnitude greater toughness with similar elastic modulus and tensile strength. However, PEEK is much more difficult to process and more expensive.

Despite their high initial strength-to-weight ratios, a design limitation of CFRPs are their lack of a definable fatigue limit. This means, theoretically, that stress cycle failure cannot be ruled out. While steel and many other structural metals and alloys do have estimable fatigue or endurance limits, the complex failure modes of composites mean that the fatigue failure properties of CFRPs are difficult to predict and design against; however, emerging research has shed light on the effects of low velocity impacts on composites. Low velocity impacts can make carbon fiber polymers susceptible to damage. As a result, when using CFRPs for critical cyclic-loading applications, engineers may need to design in considerable strength safety margins to provide suitable component reliability over its service life.

Environmental effects such as temperature and humidity can have profound effects on the polymer-based composites, including most CFRPs. While CFRPs demonstrate excellent corrosion resistance, the effect of moisture at wide ranges of temperatures can lead to degradation of the mechanical properties of CFRPs, particularly at the matrix-fiber interface. While the carbon fibers themselves are not affected by the moisture diffusing into the material, the moisture plasticizes the polymer matrix. This leads to significant changes in properties that are dominantly influenced by the matrix in CFRPs such as compressive, interlaminar shear, and impact properties. The epoxy matrix used for engine fan blades is designed to be impervious against jet fuel, lubrication, and rain water, and external paint on the composites parts is applied to minimize damage from ultraviolet light.

Carbon fibers can cause galvanic corrosion when CFRP parts are attached to aluminum or mild steel but not to stainless steel or titanium.

CFRPs are very hard to machine, and cause significant tool wear. The tool wear in CFRP machining is dependent on the fiber orientation and machining condition of the cutting process. To reduce tool wear various types of coated tools are used in machining CFRP and CFRP-metal stack.

== Manufacturing ==
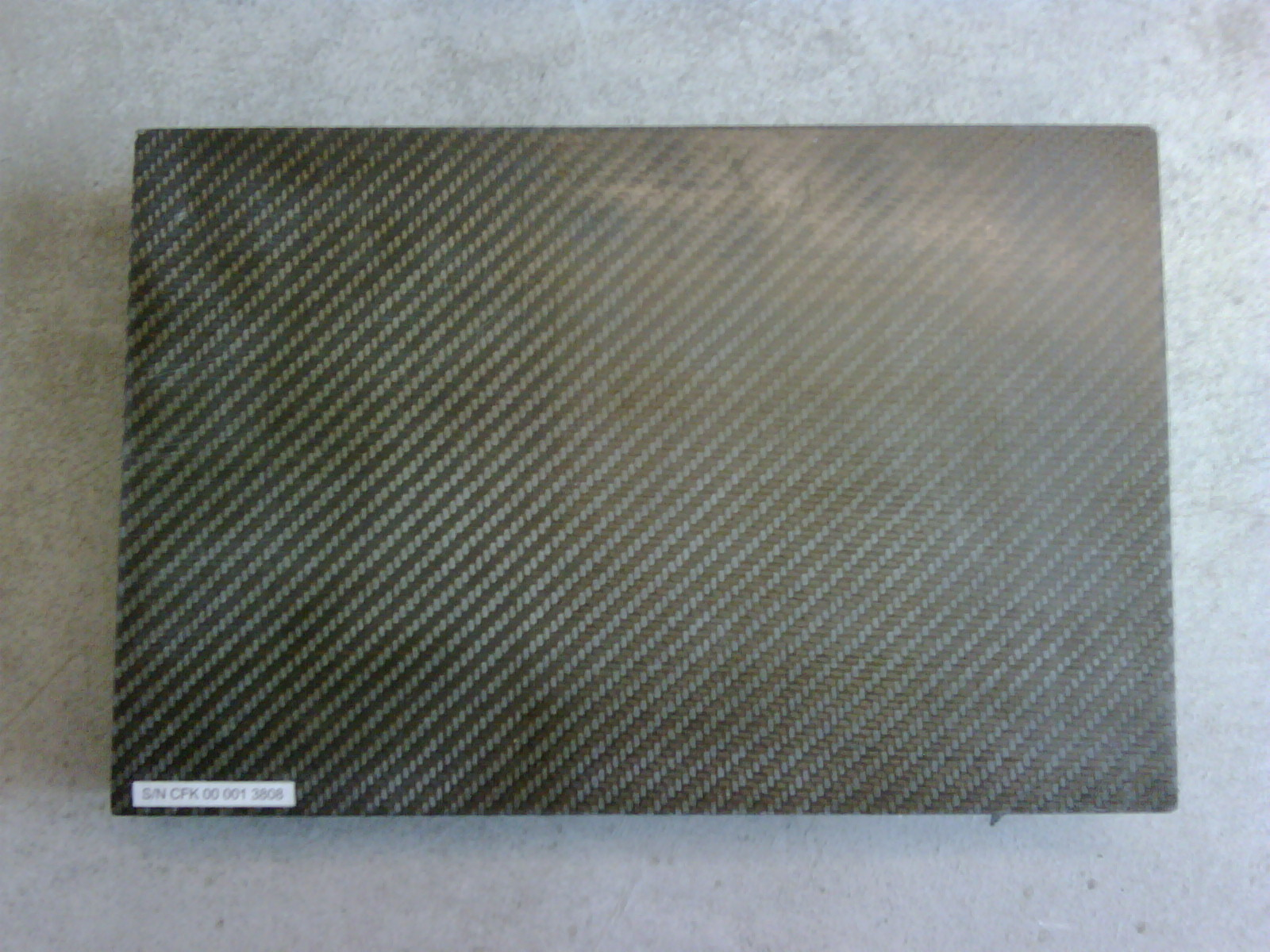
Carbon fiber reinforced polymer

The primary element of CFRPs is a carbon filament; this is produced from a precursor polymer such as polyacrylonitrile (PAN), rayon, or petroleum pitch. For synthetic polymers such as PAN or rayon, the precursor is first spun into filament yarns, using chemical and mechanical processes to initially align the polymer chains in a way to enhance the final physical properties of the completed carbon fiber. Precursor compositions and mechanical processes used during spinning filament yarns may vary among manufacturers. After drawing or spinning, the polymer filament yarns are then heated to drive off non-carbon atoms (carbonization), producing the final carbon fiber. The carbon fibers filament yarns may be further treated to improve handling qualities, then wound onto bobbins. From these fibers, a unidirectional sheet is created. These sheets are layered onto each other in a quasi-isotropic layup, e.g. 0°, +60°, or −60° relative to each other.

From the elementary fiber, a bidirectional woven sheet can be created, i.e. a twill with a 2/2 weave. The process by which most CFRPs are made varies, depending on the piece being created, the finish (outside gloss) required, and how many of the piece will be produced. In addition, the choice of matrix can have a profound effect on the properties of the finished composite.

Many CFRP parts are created with a single layer of carbon fabric that is backed with fiberglass. A tool called a chopper gun is used to quickly create these composite parts. Once a thin shell is created out of carbon fiber, the chopper gun cuts rolls of fiberglass into short lengths and sprays resin at the same time, so that the fiberglass and resin are mixed on the spot. The resin is either external mix, wherein the hardener and resin are sprayed separately, or internal mixed, which requires cleaning after every use. Manufacturing methods may include the following:

=== Molding ===
One method of producing CFRP parts is by layering sheets of carbon fiber cloth into a mold in the shape of the final product. The alignment and weave of the cloth fibers is chosen to optimize the strength and stiffness properties of the resulting material. The mold is then filled with epoxy and is heated or air-cured. The resulting part is very corrosion-resistant, stiff, and strong for its weight. Parts used in less critical areas are manufactured by draping cloth over a mold, with epoxy either pre-impregnated into the fibers (also known as pre-preg) or "painted" over it. High-performance parts using single molds are often vacuum-bagged and/or autoclave-cured, because even small air bubbles in the material will reduce strength. An alternative to the autoclave method is to use internal pressure via inflatable air bladders or EPS foam inside the non-cured laid-up carbon fiber.

=== Vacuum bagging ===
For simple pieces of which relatively few copies are needed (one or two per day), a vacuum bag can be used. A fiberglass, carbon fiber, or aluminum mold is polished and waxed, and has a release agent applied before the fabric and resin are applied, and the vacuum is pulled and set aside to allow the piece to cure (harden). There are three ways to apply the resin to the fabric in a vacuum mold.

The first method is manual and called a wet layup, where the two-part resin is mixed and applied before being laid in the mold and placed in the bag.

The second method is called infusion, where the dry fabric and mold are placed inside the bag while the vacuum pulls the resin through a small tube into the bag, then through a tube with holes or something similar to evenly spread the resin throughout the fabric. Both of the above methods of applying resin require hand work to spread the resin evenly for a glossy finish with very small pin-holes.

A third method of constructing composite materials is known as a dry layup. Here, the carbon fiber material is already impregnated with resin (pre-preg) and is applied to the mold in a similar fashion to adhesive film. The assembly is then placed in a vacuum to cure. The dry layup method has the least amount of resin waste and can achieve lighter constructions than wet layup. Also, because larger amounts of resin are more difficult to bleed out with wet layup methods, pre-preg parts generally have fewer pinholes. Pinhole elimination with minimal resin amounts generally require the use of autoclave pressures to purge the residual gases out.

=== Compression molding ===
A quicker method uses a compression mold, also commonly known as carbon fiber forging. This is a two (male and female), or multi-piece mold, usually made out of aluminum or steel and more recently 3D printed plastic. The mold components are pressed together with the fabric and resin loaded into the inner cavity that ultimately becomes the desired component. The benefit is the speed of the entire process. Some car manufacturers, such as BMW, claimed to be able to cycle a new part every 80 seconds. This technique results in parts with limited or variable strength because the direction of the fibers cannot be controlled as with the other methods.

=== Filament winding ===
For difficult or convoluted shapes, a filament winder can be used to make CFRP parts by winding filaments around a mandrel or a core.

=== Cutting ===
Carbon fiber-reinforced pre-pregs and dry carbon fiber textiles require precise cutting methods to maintain material integrity and reduce defects such as fiber pull-out, delamination and fraying of the cutting edge. CNC digital cutting systems equipped with drag and oscillating are often used to cut carbon fiber pre-pregs, and rotating knives are commonly used to process carbon fiber fabrics. Ultrasonic cutting is another method to cut CFRP pre-pregs and is particularly effective in reducing delamination by minimizing mechanical stress during the cutting process. Waterjet cutting can be the preferred method for thicker and multilayered polymer composites.

== Applications ==
Applications for CFRPs include the following:

=== Aerospace engineering ===
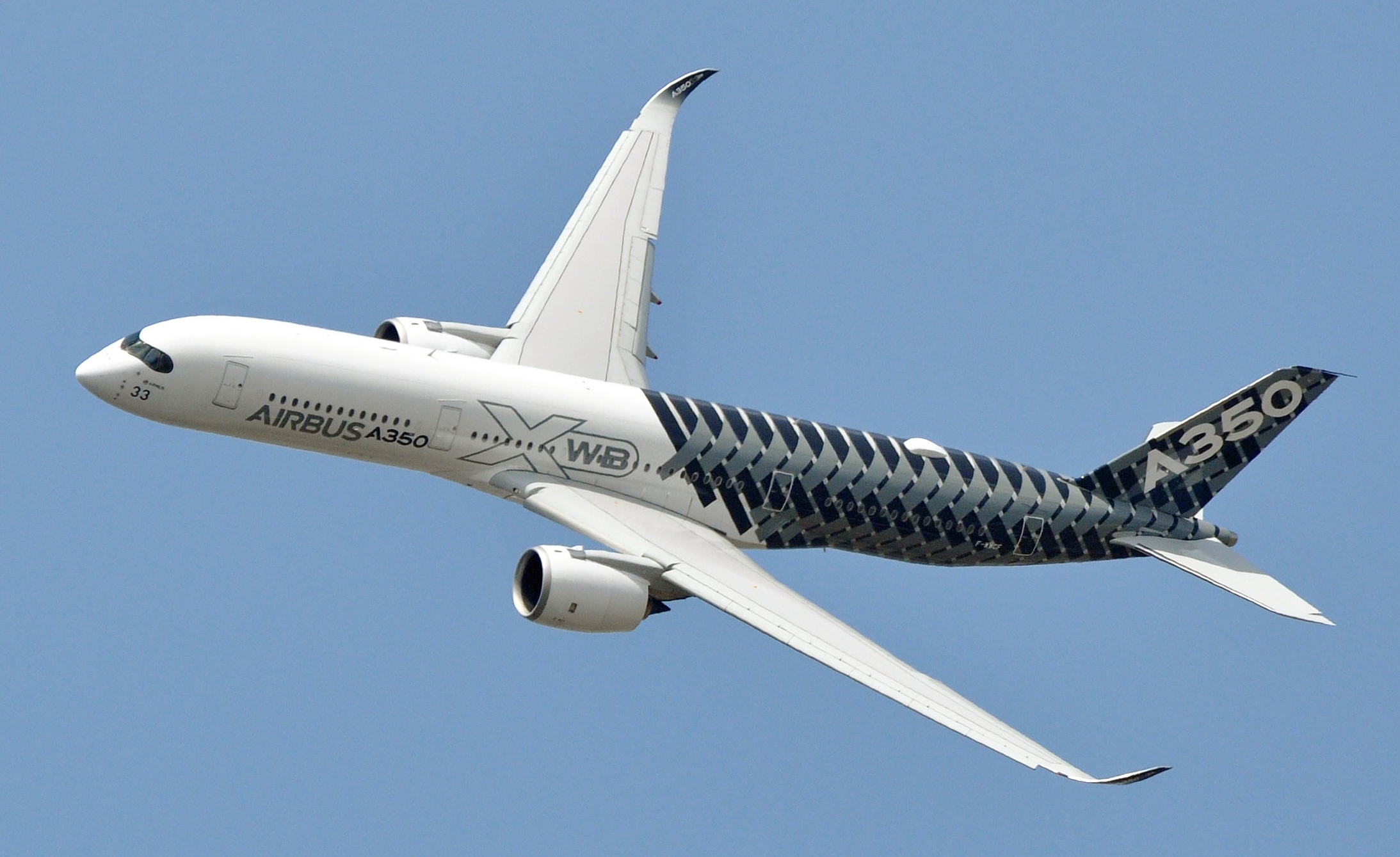
An Airbus A350 with carbon fiber themed livery. Composite materials are used extensively throughout the A350.

The Airbus A350 XWB is 53% CFRP including wing spars and fuselage components, overtaking the Boeing 787 Dreamliner, for the aircraft with the highest weight ratio for CFRP at 50%. It was one of the first commercial aircraft to have wing spars made from composites. The Airbus A380 was one of the first commercial airliners to have a central wing-box made of CFRP and the first with a smoothly contoured wing cross-section instead of partitioning it span-wise into sections. This flowing, continuous cross section optimises aerodynamic efficiency. Moreover, the trailing edge, along with the rear bulkhead, empennage, and un-pressurised fuselage are made of CFRP.

However, delays have pushed order delivery dates back because of manufacturing problems. Many aircraft that use CFRPs have experienced delays with delivery dates due to the relatively new processes used to make CFRP components, whereas metallic structures are better understood. A recurrent problem is the monitoring of structural ageing, for which new methods are required, due to the unusual multi-material and anisotropic nature of CFRPs.

In 1968 a Hyfil carbon-fiber fan assembly was in service on the Rolls-Royce Conways of the Vickers VC10s operated by BOAC.

Specialist aircraft designers and manufacturers Scaled Composites have made extensive use of CFRPs throughout their design range, including the first private crewed spacecraft Spaceship One. CFRPs are widely used in micro air vehicles (MAVs) because of their high strength-to-weight ratio.

Airbus then moved to adopt carbon fiber reinforced thermoplastic polymers (CFRTP), because they can be reshaped and reprocessed after forming, can be manufactured faster, has higher impact resistance, is recyclable and remoldable, and has lower processing costs.

=== Automotive engineering ===
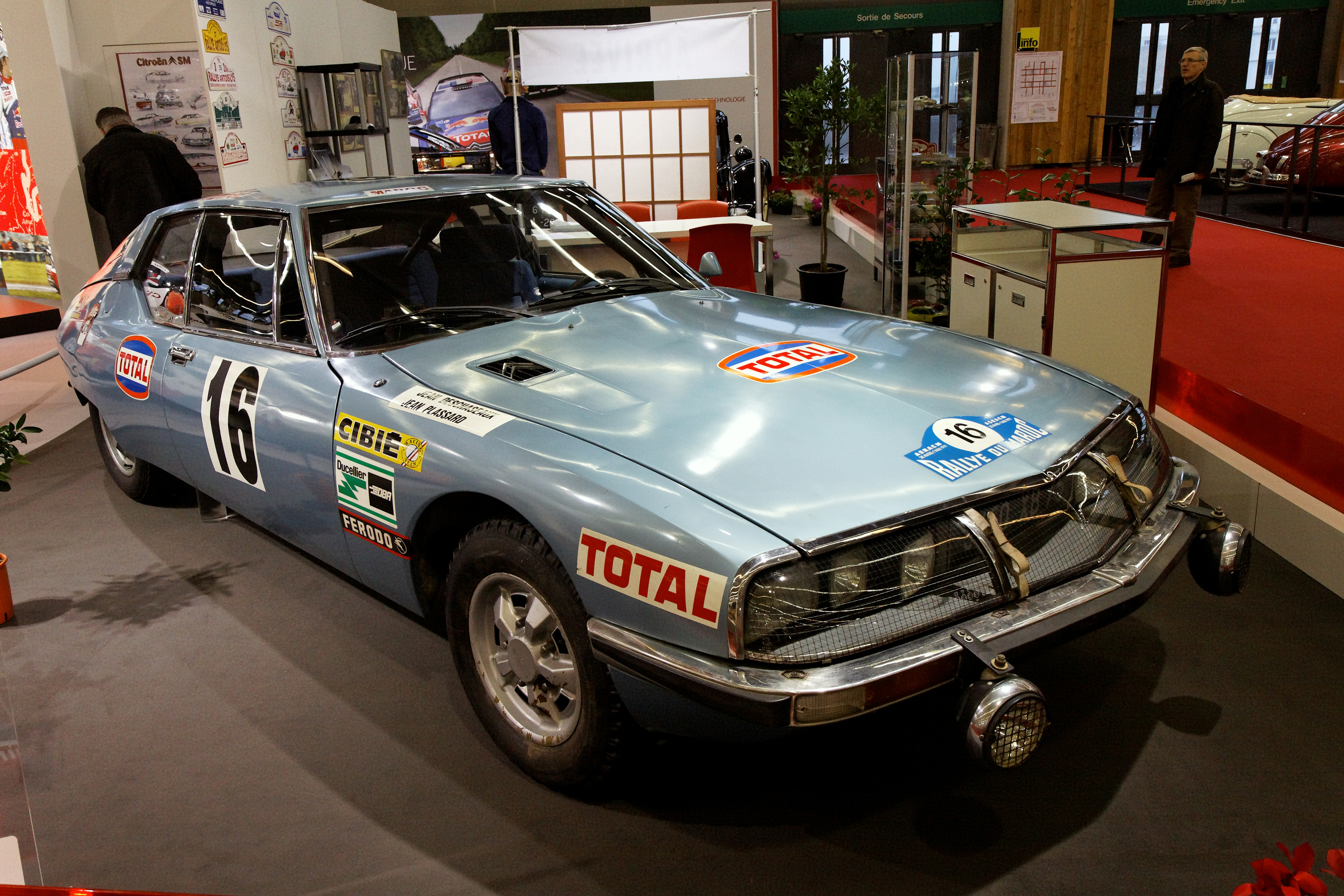
Citroën SM that won 1971 Rally of Morocco with carbon fiber wheels

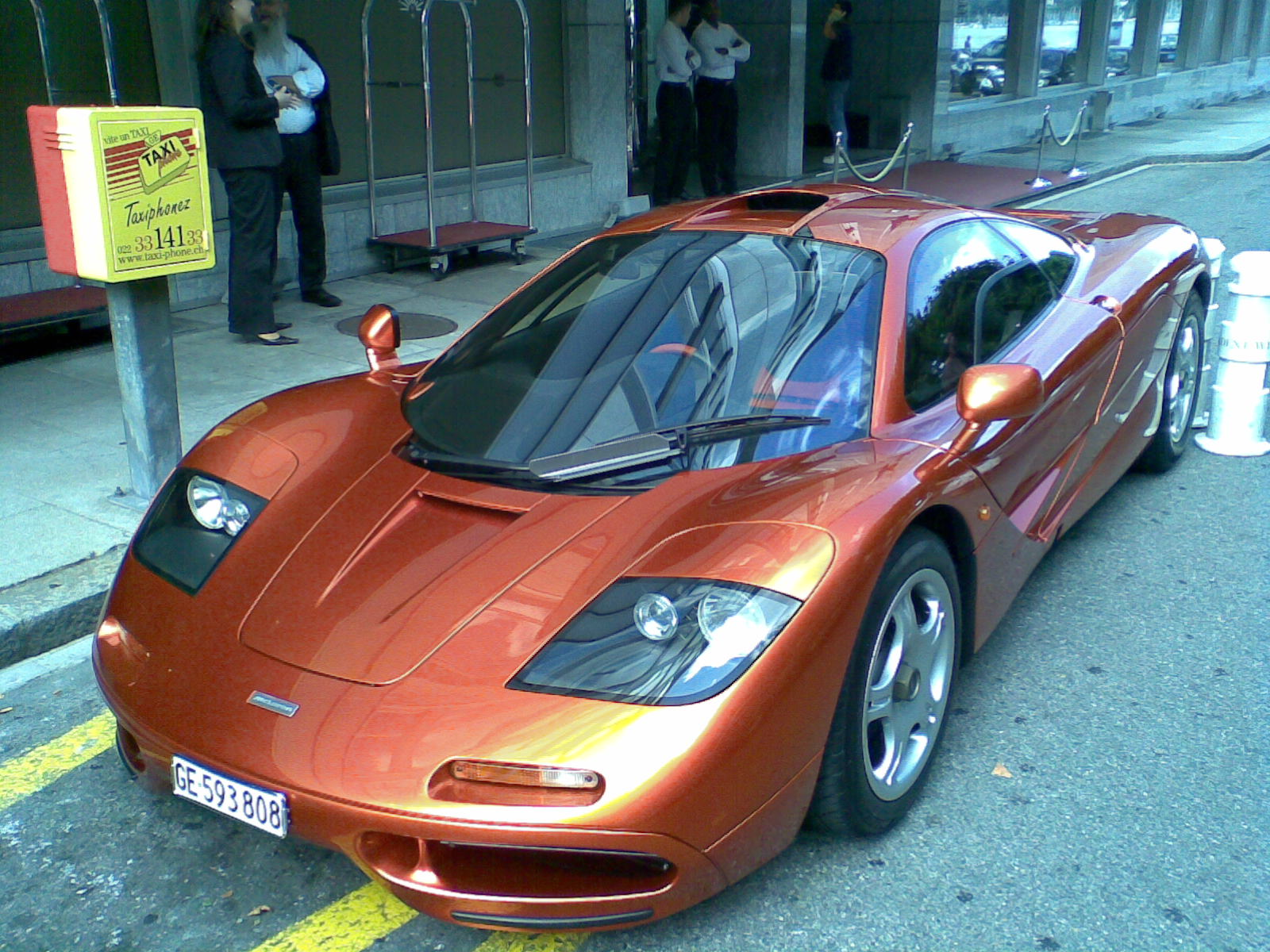
1996 McLaren F1 – first carbon fiber body shell

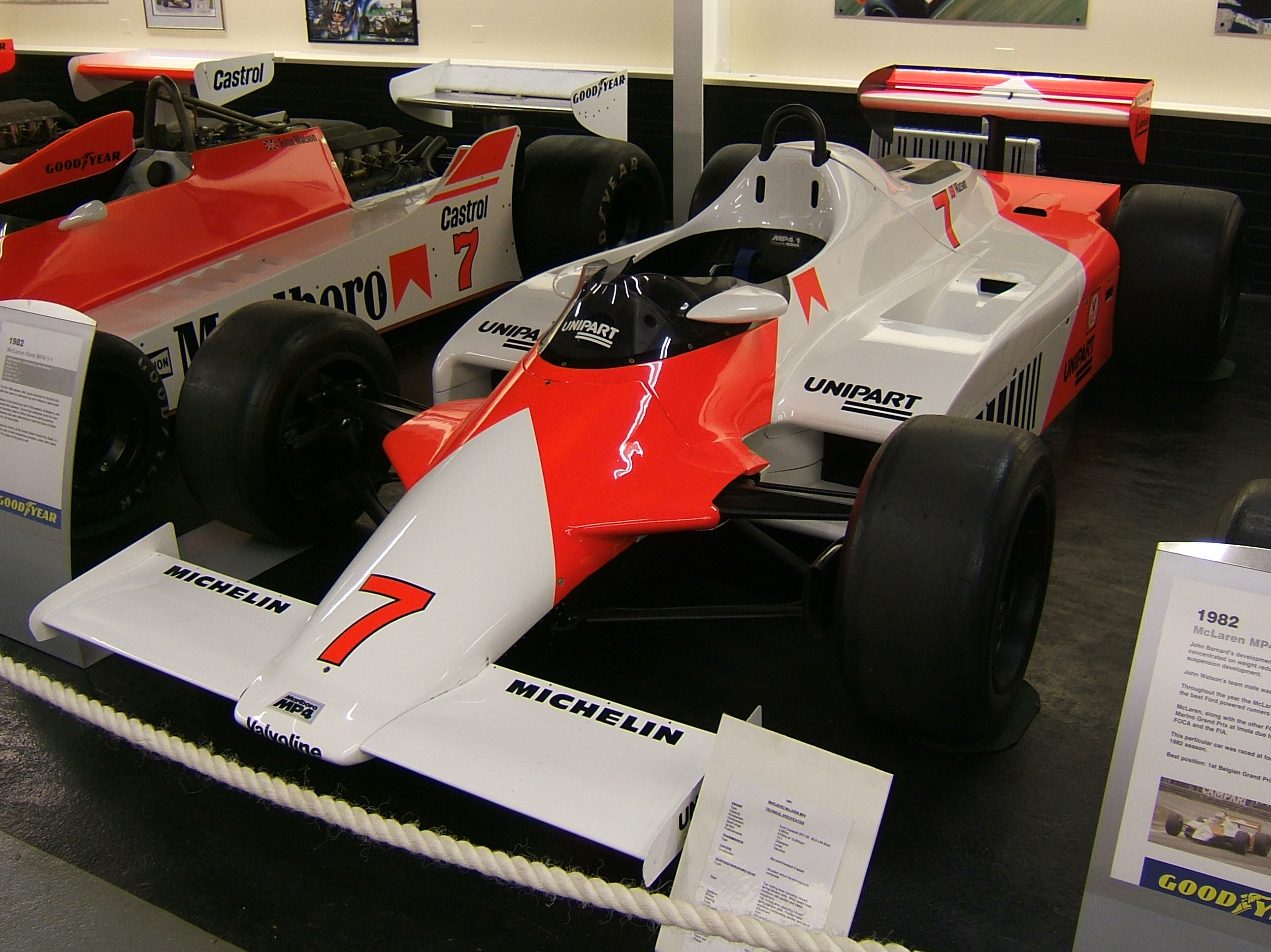
McLaren MP4 (MP4/1), first carbon fiber F1 car

CFRPs are extensively used in high-end automobile racing. The high cost of carbon fiber is mitigated by the material's unsurpassed strength-to-weight ratio, and low weight is essential for high-performance automobile racing. Race-car manufacturers have also developed methods to give carbon fiber pieces strength in a certain direction, making it strong in a load-bearing direction, but weak in directions where little or no load would be placed on the member. Conversely, manufacturers developed omnidirectional carbon fiber weaves that apply strength in all directions. This type of carbon fiber assembly is most widely used in the "safety cell" monocoque chassis assembly of high-performance race-cars. The first carbon fiber monocoque chassis was introduced in Formula One by McLaren in the 1981 season. It was designed by John Barnard and was widely copied in the following seasons by other F1 teams due to the extra rigidity provided to the chassis of the cars.

Many supercars over the past few decades have incorporated CFRPs extensively in their manufacture, using it for their monocoque chassis as well as other components. As far back as 1971, the Citroën SM offered optional lightweight carbon fiber wheels.

Use of the material has been more readily adopted by low-volume manufacturers who used it primarily for creating body-panels for some of their high-end cars due to its increased strength and decreased weight compared with the glass-reinforced polymer they used for the majority of their products.

=== Civil engineering ===
CFRPs have become a notable material in structural engineering applications. Studied in an academic context as to their potential benefits in construction, CFRPs have also proved themselves cost-effective in a number of field applications strengthening concrete, masonry, steel, cast iron, and timber structures. Their use in industry can be either for retrofitting to strengthen an existing structure or as an alternative reinforcing (or prestressing) material instead of steel from the outset of a project.

Retrofitting has become the increasingly dominant use of the material in civil engineering, and applications include increasing the load capacity of old structures (such as bridges, beams, ceilings, columns and walls) that were designed to tolerate far lower service loads than they are experiencing today, seismic retrofitting, and repair of damaged structures. Retrofitting is popular in many instances as the cost of replacing the deficient structure can greatly exceed the cost of strengthening using CFRP.

Applied to reinforced concrete structures for flexure, the use of CFRPs typically has a large impact on strength (doubling or more the strength of the section is not uncommon), but only moderately increases stiffness (as little as 10%). This is because the material used in such applications is typically very strong (e.g., 3 GPa ultimate tensile strength, more than 10 times mild steel) but not particularly stiff (150 to 250 GPa elastic modulus, a little less than steel, is typical). As a consequence, only small cross-sectional areas of the material are used. Small areas of very high strength but moderate stiffness material will significantly increase strength, but not stiffness.

CFRPs can also be used to enhance shear strength of reinforced concrete by wrapping fabrics or fibers around the section to be strengthened. Wrapping around sections (such as bridge or building columns) can also enhance the ductility of the section, greatly increasing the resistance to collapse under dynamic loading. Such 'seismic retrofit' is the major application in earthquake-prone areas, since it is much more economic than alternative methods.

If a column is circular (or nearly so) an increase in axial capacity is also achieved by wrapping. In this application, the confinement of the CFRP wrap enhances the compressive strength of the concrete. However, although large increases are achieved in the ultimate collapse load, the concrete will crack at only slightly enhanced load, meaning that this application is only occasionally used. Specialist ultra-high modulus CFRP (with tensile modulus of 420 GPa or more) is one of the few practical methods of strengthening cast iron beams. In typical use, it is bonded to the tensile flange of the section, both increasing the stiffness of the section and lowering the neutral axis, thus greatly reducing the maximum tensile stress in the cast iron.

In the United States, prestressed concrete cylinder pipes (PCCP) account for a vast majority of water transmission mains. Due to their large diameters, failures of PCCP are usually catastrophic and affect large populations. Approximately 19,000 miles (31,000 km) of PCCP were installed between 1940 and 2006. Corrosion in the form of hydrogen embrittlement has been blamed for the gradual deterioration of the prestressing wires in many PCCP lines. Over the past decade, CFRPs have been used to internally line PCCP, resulting in a fully structural strengthening system. Inside a PCCP line, the CFRP liner acts as a barrier that controls the level of strain experienced by the steel cylinder in the host pipe. The composite liner enables the steel cylinder to perform within its elastic range, to ensure the pipeline's long-term performance is maintained. CFRP liner designs are based on strain compatibility between the liner and host pipe.

CFRPs are more costly materials than their commonly used counterparts in the construction industry, glass fiber-reinforced polymers (GFRPs) and aramid fiber-reinforced polymers (AFRPs), though CFRPs are, in general, regarded as having superior properties. Much research continues to be done on using CFRPs both for retrofitting and as an alternative to steel as reinforcing or prestressing materials. Cost remains an issue and long-term durability questions still remain. Some are concerned about the brittle nature of CFRPs, in contrast to the ductility of steel. Though design codes have been drawn up by institutions such as the American Concrete Institute, there remains some hesitation among the engineering community about implementing these alternative materials. In part, this is due to a lack of standardization and the proprietary nature of the fiber and resin combinations on the market.

=== Carbon-fiber microelectrodes ===
Carbon fibers are used for fabrication of carbon-fiber microelectrodes. In this application typically a single carbon fiber with diameter of 5–7 μm is sealed in a glass capillary. At the tip the capillary is either sealed with epoxy and polished to make carbon-fiber disk microelectrode or the fiber is cut to a length of 75–150 μm to make carbon-fiber cylinder electrode. Carbon-fiber microelectrodes are used either in amperometry or fast-scan cyclic voltammetry for detection of biochemical signalling.

=== Sports goods ===
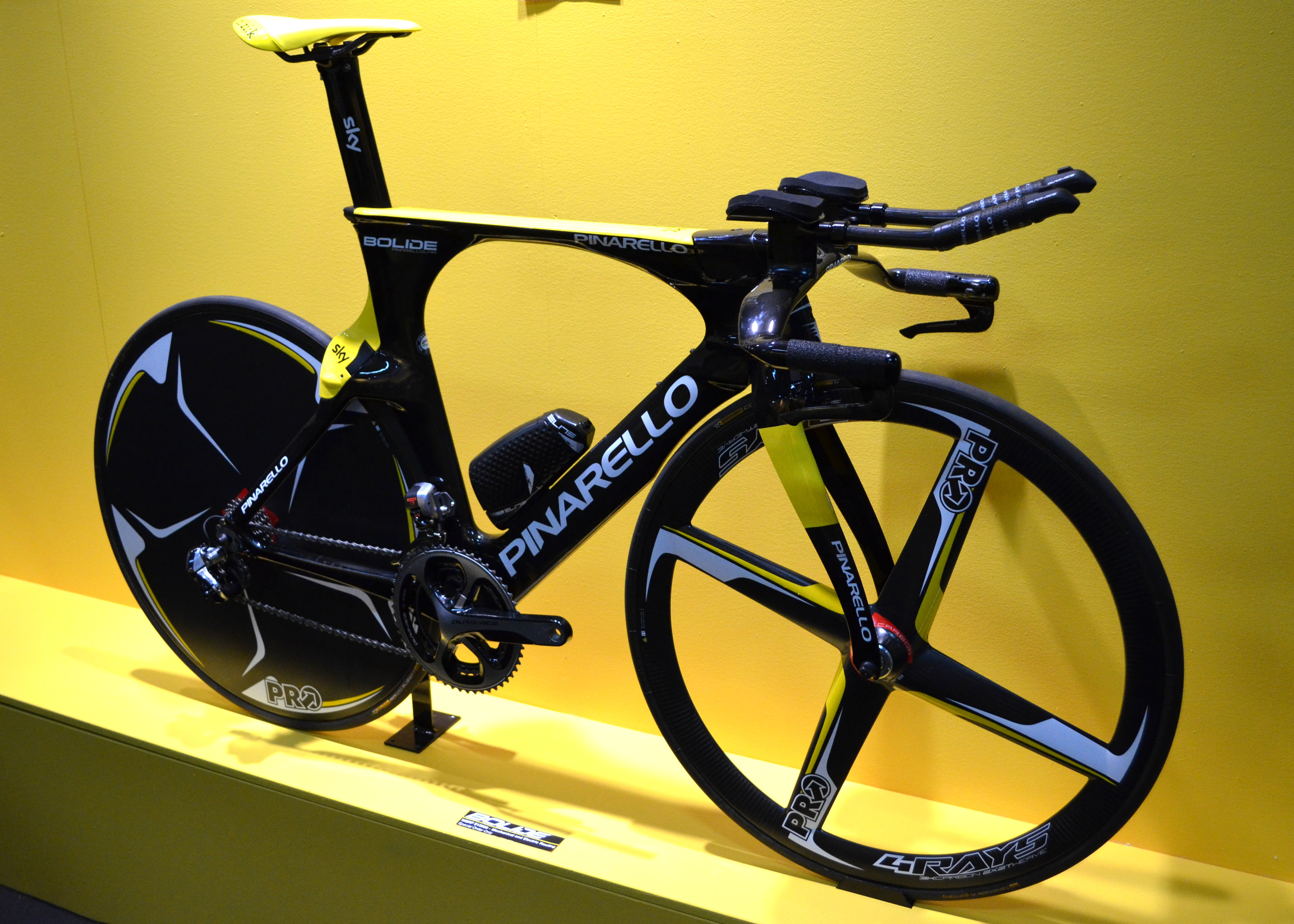
Pinarello bicycle

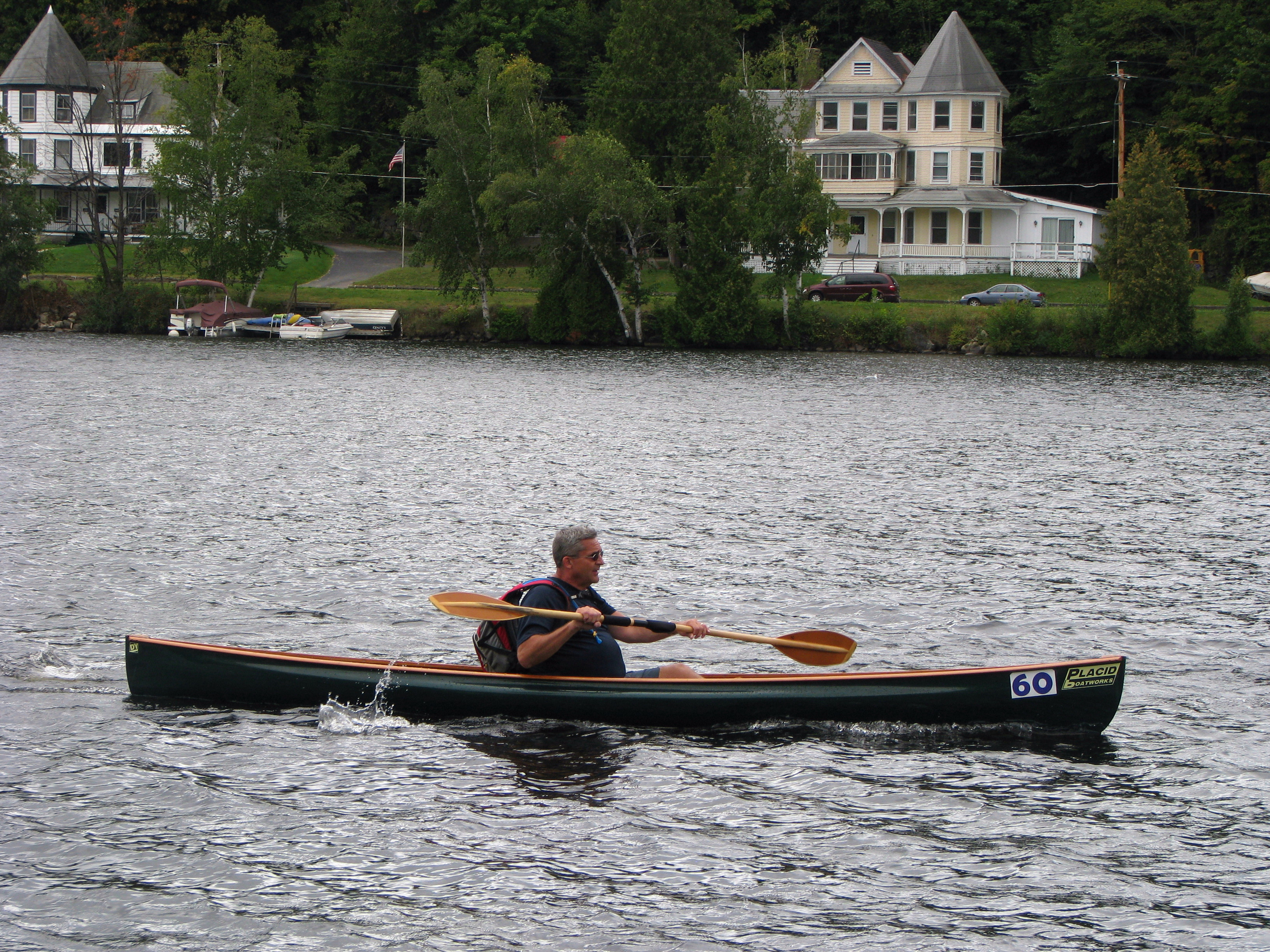
A carbon-fiber and Kevlar canoe (Placid Boatworks Rapidfire at the Adirondack Canoe Classic)

CFRPs are now widely used in sports equipment such as in squash, tennis, and badminton racquets, sport kite spars, high-quality arrow shafts, hockey sticks, fishing rods, surfboards, high end swim fins, and rowing shells. Amputee athletes such as Jonnie Peacock use carbon fiber blades for running. It is used as a shank plate in some basketball sneakers to keep the foot stable, usually running the length of the shoe just above the sole and left exposed in some areas, usually in the arch.

Controversially, in 2006, cricket bats with a thin carbon-fiber layer on the back were introduced and used in competitive matches by high-profile players including Ricky Ponting and Michael Hussey. The carbon fiber was claimed to merely increase the durability of the bats, but it was banned from all first-class matches by the ICC in 2007.

A CFRP bicycle frame weighs less than one of steel, aluminum, or titanium having the same strength. The type and orientation of the carbon-fiber weave can be designed to maximize stiffness in required directions. Frames can be tuned to address different riding styles: sprint events require stiffer frames while endurance events may require more flexible frames for rider comfort over longer periods. The variety of shapes it can be built into has further increased stiffness and also allowed aerodynamic tube sections. CFRP forks including suspension fork crowns and steerers, handlebars, seatposts, and crank arms are becoming more common on medium as well as higher-priced bicycles. CFRP rims remain expensive but their stability compared to aluminium reduces the need to re-true a wheel and the reduced mass reduces the moment of inertia of the wheel. CFRP spokes are rare and most carbon wheelsets retain traditional stainless steel spokes. CFRPs also appear increasingly in other components such as derailleur parts, brake and shifter levers and bodies, cassette sprocket carriers, suspension linkages, disc brake rotors, pedals, shoe soles, and saddle rails. Although strong and light, impact, over-torquing, or improper installation of CFRP components has resulted in cracking and failures, which may be difficult or impossible to repair.

=== Other applications ===
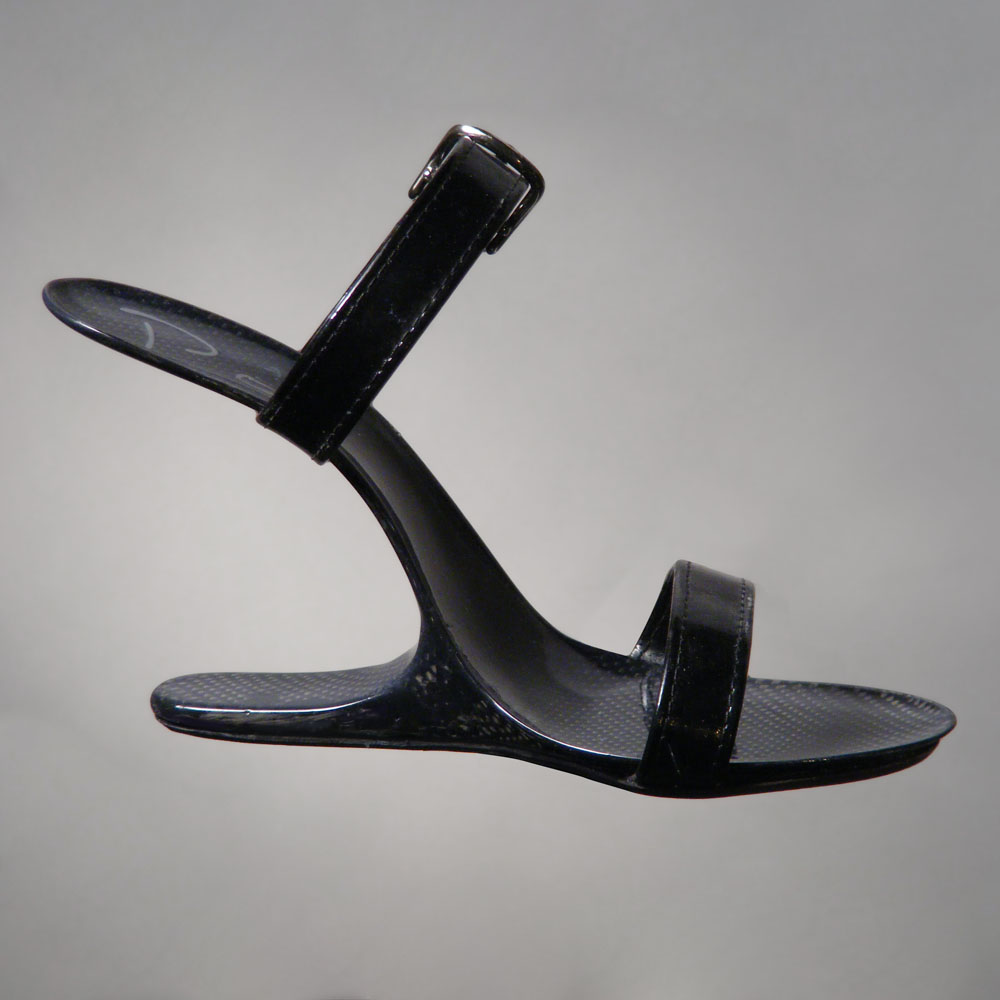
Strada cantilevered high-heels shoe by Pol Quadens

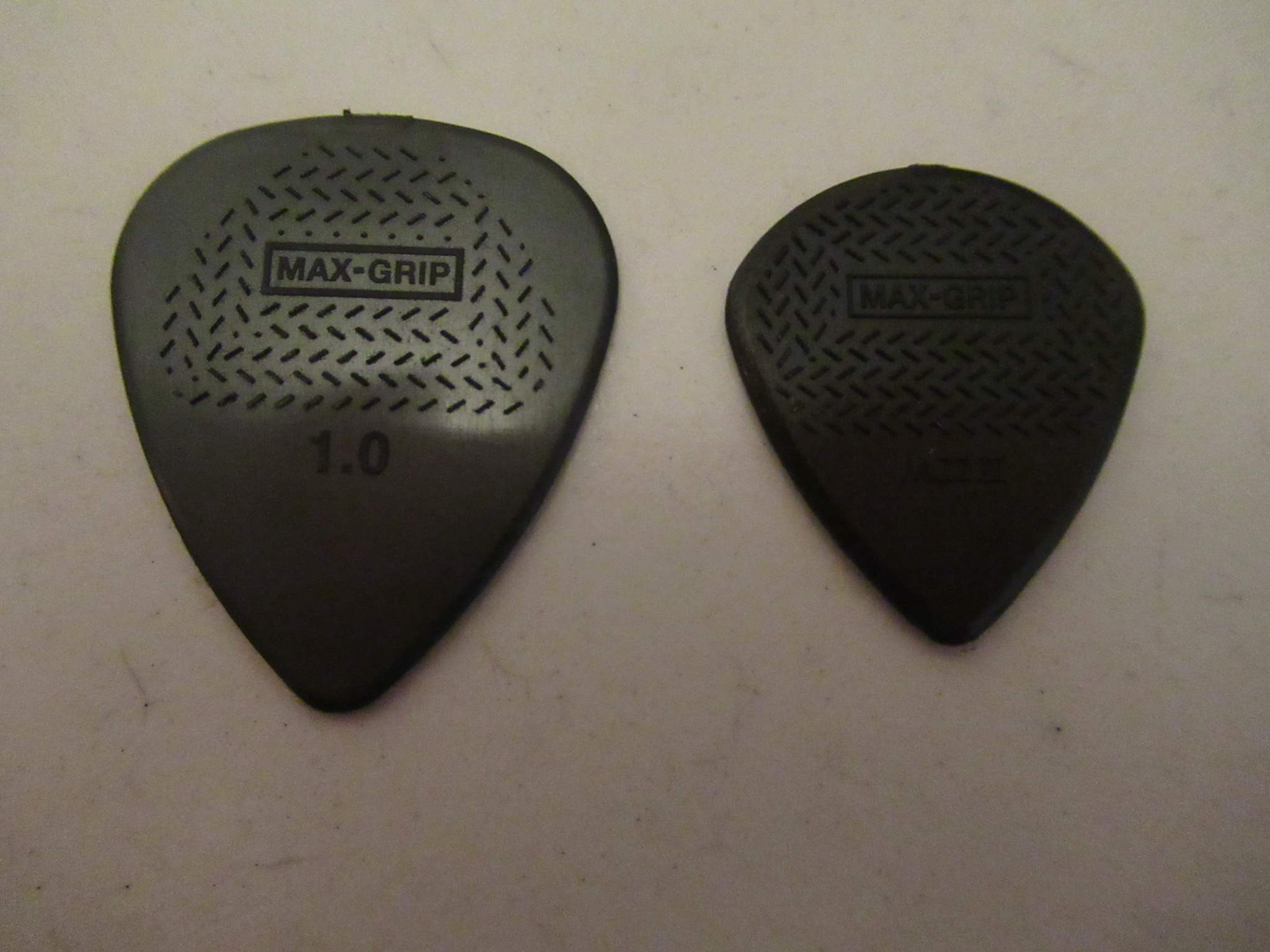
Dunlop "Max-Grip" carbon fiber guitar picks. Sizes 1mm and Jazz III.

The fire resistance of polymers and thermo-set composites is significantly improved if a thin layer of carbon fibers is moulded near the surface because a dense, compact layer of carbon fibers efficiently reflects heat.

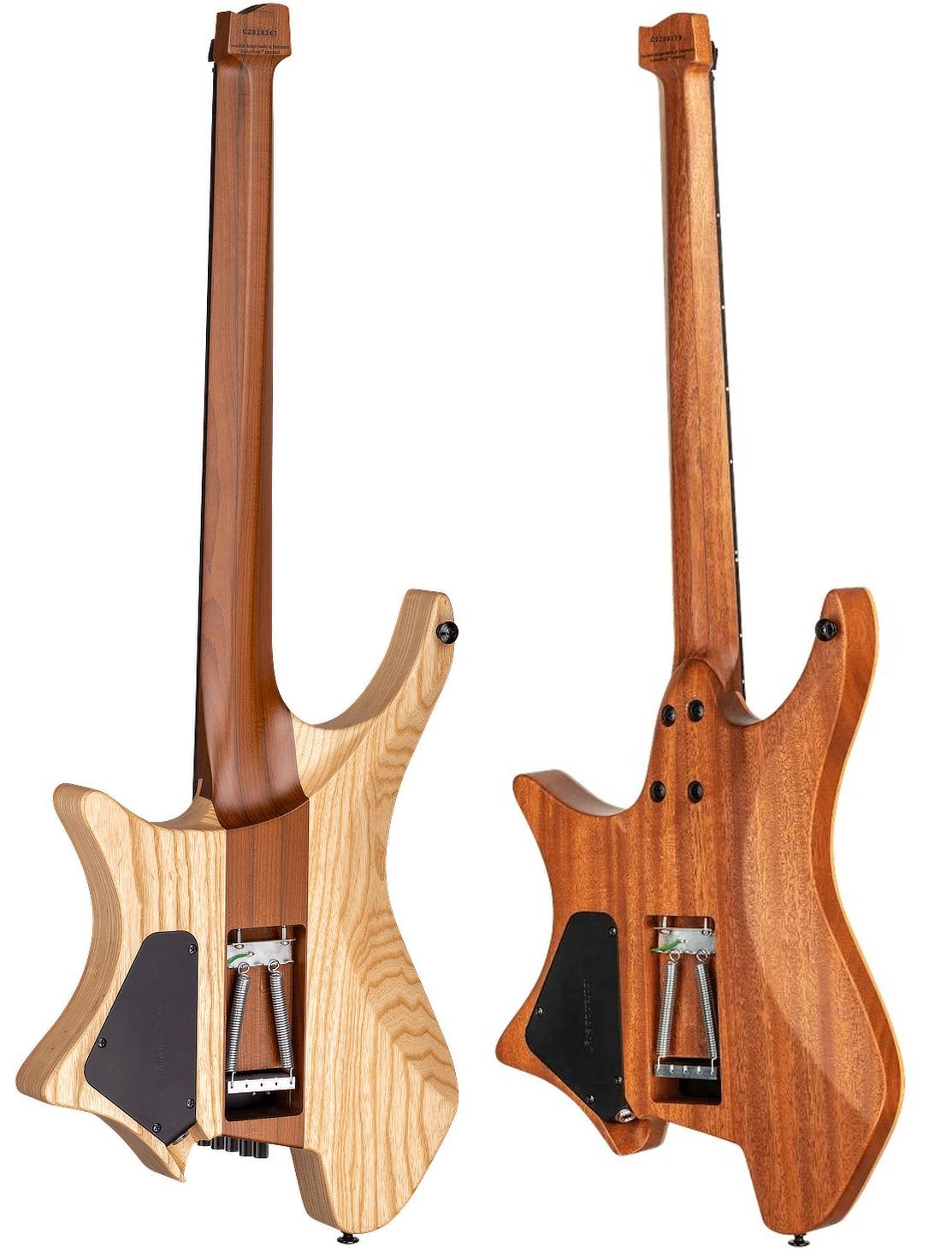
Strandberg Boden Plini neck-thru and bolt on versions that both utilize carbon fiber reinforcement strips to maintain rigidity.

CFRPs are being used in an increasing number of high-end products that require stiffness and low weight, these include:

- Musical instruments, including violin bows; guitar picks, guitar necks (fitted with carbon fiber rods), pickguards/scratchplates; drum shells; bagpipe chanters; piano actions; and entire musical instruments such as carbon fiber cellos, violas, and violins, acoustic guitars and ukuleles; also, audio components such as turntables and loudspeakers.
- Firearms use it to replace certain metal, wood, and fiberglass components but many of the internal parts are still limited to metal alloys as current reinforced plastics are unsuitable.
- High-performance drone bodies and other radio-controlled vehicle and aircraft components such as helicopter rotor blades.
- Lightweight poles such as: tripod legs, tent poles, fishing rods, billiards cues, walking sticks, and high-reach poles such as for window cleaning.
- Dentistry, carbon fiber posts are used in restoring root canal treated teeth.
- Railed train bogies for passenger service. This reduces the weight by up to 50% compared to metal bogies, which contributes to energy savings.
- Laptop shells and other high performance cases.
- Carbon woven fabrics.
- Archery: carbon fiber arrows and bolts, stock (for crossbows) and riser (for vertical bows), and rail.
- As a filament for the 3D fused deposition modeling printing process, carbon fiber-reinforced plastic (polyamide-carbon filament) is used for the production of sturdy but lightweight tools and parts due to its high strength and tear length.
- District heating pipe rehabilitation, using a CIPP method.

== Disposal and recycling ==
The key aspect of recycling fiber-reinforced polymers is preserving their mechanical properties while successfully recovering both the thermoplastic matrix and the reinforcing fibers. CFRPs have a long service lifetime when protected from the sun. When it is time to decommission CFRPs, they cannot be melted down in air like many metals. When free of vinyl (PVC or polyvinyl chloride) and other halogenated polymers, CFRPs recycling processes can be categorized into four main approaches: mechanical, thermal, chemical, and biological. Each method offers distinct advantages in terms of material or energy recovery, contributing to sustainability efforts in composite waste management.

Process	Matrix recovery	Fiber recovery	Degradation of mechanical properties	Advantages	Drawbacks
Mechanical	Yes	Yes	Yes	No use of hazardous chemical substances; No gas emissions; Low-cost energy needed; Big volumes can be recycled	Poor bonding between fiber/matrix; Fibers can damage the equipment
Chemical	No	Yes	No	Long clean fibers; Retention of mechanical properties; Sometimes there is high recovery of the matrix	Expensive equipment; Possible use of hazardous solvent
Thermal	No	Yes	Yes	Fiber length retention; No use of hazardous chemical substances; Better mechanical properties than mechanical approach; Matrix used to produce energy	Recovered fiber properties highly influenced by process parameters; Some processes have no recovery of matrix material

=== Mechanical recycling ===
The mechanical process primarily involves grinding, which breaks down composite materials into pulverulent charges and fibrous reinforcements. This method is focused on both the thermoplastic and filler material recovery; however, this process shortens the fibers dramatically. Just as with downcycled paper, the shortened fibers cause the recycled material to be weaker than the original material. There are still many industrial applications that do not need the strength of full-length carbon fiber reinforcement. For example, chopped reclaimed carbon fiber can be used in consumer electronics, such as laptops. It provides excellent reinforcement of the polymers used even if it lacks the strength-to-weight ratio of an aerospace component.

==== Electro-fragmentation ====
This method consists in shredding CFRP by pulsed electrical discharges. Initially developed to extract crystals and precious stones from mining rocks, it is now expected to be developed for composites. The material is placed in a vessel containing water and two electrodes. The high voltage electrical pulse generated between the electrodes (50–200 kV) fragments the material into smaller pieces. The inconvenient of this technique is that the energy consumed is 2.6 times the one of a mechanical route making it not economically competitive in terms of energy saving and needs further investigation.

=== Thermal recycling ===
Thermal processes include several techniques such as incineration, thermolysis, pyrolysis, gasification, fluidized bed processing, and cement plant utilization. This processes imply the recovery of the fibers by the removal of the resin by volatilizing it, leading to by-products such as gases, liquids or inorganic matter.

==== Oxidation in fluidized bed ====
This technique consists in exposing the composite to a hot and oxygen-rich flow, in which it is combusted (450–550 °C, 840–1,020 °F). The working temperature is selected in function of the matrix to be decomposed, to limit damages of the fibers. After a shredding step to 6–20 mm size, the composite is introduced into a bed of silica sand, on a metallic mesh, in which the resin will be decomposed into oxidized molecules and fiber filaments. These components will be carried up with the air stream while heavier particles will sink in the bed. This last point is a great advantage for contaminated end-of-life products, with painted surfaces, foam cores or metal insert. A cyclonic separator enables the recovery of fibers of length ranging between 5 and 10 mm and with very little contamination. The matrix is fully oxidized in a second burner operating at approximatively 1,000 °C (1,850 °F) leading to energy recovery and a clean flue gas.

=== Chemical recycling ===
The chemical recycling of CFRPs involves using a reactive solvent at relatively low temperatures (below 350°C) to break down the resin while leaving the fibers intact for reuse. The solvent degrades the composite matrix into smaller molecular fragments (oligomer), and depending on the chosen solvent system, various processing parameters such as temperature, pressure, and catalysts can be adjusted to optimize the process. The solvent, often combined with co-solvents or catalysts, penetrates the composite and breaks specific chemical bonds, resulting in recovered monomers from the resin and clean, long fibers with preserved mechanical properties. The required temperature and pressure depend on the type of resin, with epoxy resins generally needing higher temperatures than polyester resins. Among the different reactive mediums studied, water is the most commonly used due to its environmental benefits. When combined with alkaline catalysts, it effectively degrades many resins, while acidic catalysts are used for more resistant polymers. Other solvents, such as ethanol, acetone, and their mixtures, have also been explored for this process.

Despite its advantages, this method has some limitations. It requires specialized equipment capable of handling corrosive solvents, hazardous chemicals, and high temperatures or pressures, especially when operating under supercritical conditions. While extensively researched at the laboratory scale, industrial adoption remains limited, with the technology currently reaching a Technology Readiness Level (TRL) of 4 for carbon fiber recycling.

==== Dissolution process ====
The dissolution process is a method used to recover both the polymer matrix and fibers from thermoplastic composites without breaking chemical bonds. Unlike solvolysis, which involves the chemical degradation of the polymer, dissolution simply dissolves the polymer chains into a solvent, allowing for material recovery in its original form. An energy analysis of the process indicated that dissolution followed by evaporation was more energy-efficient than precipitation. Additionally, avoiding precipitation helped minimize polymer loss, improving overall material recovery efficiency. This method offers a promising approach for sustainable recycling of thermoplastic composites.

=== Biological recycling ===
The biological process, though still under development, focuses on biodegradation and composting. This method holds promise for bio-based and agro-composites, aiming to create an environmentally friendly end-of-life solution for these materials. As research advances, biological recycling may offer an effective means of reducing plastic composite waste in a sustainable manner.

== Carbon nanotube reinforced polymer (CNRP) ==
In 2009, Zyvex Technologies introduced carbon nanotube-reinforced epoxy and carbon pre-pregs. Carbon nanotube reinforced polymer (CNRP) is several times stronger and tougher than typical CFRPs and is used in the Lockheed Martin F-35 Lightning II as a structural material for aircraft. CNRP still uses carbon fiber as the primary reinforcement, but the binding matrix is a carbon nanotube-filled epoxy.

== See also ==
- Carbon fibers – Material fibers about 5–10 μm in diameter composed of carbon
- Composite repair – Composite repair patch preparation and application
- Mechanics of Oscar Pistorius's running blades – Blades used by South African Paralympic runner Oscar Pistorius
- Reinforced carbon–carbon – Graphite-based composite for ultra-high temperature applications
- Forged carbon fiber
- Carbon-ceramic
- Carbotanium
