= Carbotanium =

Carbon-titanium composite material

Carbotanium is a combination of beta titanium alloy and carbon composite. It is commonly used in Pagani cars.

== Properties ==
Carbotanium is a combination of beta titanium alloy with advanced carbon composites, having a matched yield strength and moduli of elasticity ratio. When the combination is adhesively bonded, both parts will approach maximum yield strength and fail at a similar amount of total strain. The components of carbotanium, carbon fiber and titanium, are woven together to form a strong, light material that can withstand significant amounts of heat and strain. This is because carbon fiber has the highest strength-to-density ratio of any current fiber and titanium has the highest strength-to-density ratio of any current metal. As a result, carbotanium can withstand temperatures up to 315 °C. The material properties of carbotanium are a mixture of those of a titanium alloy and a carbon fiber.

== Manufacturing ==
The titanium and carbon composites are combined by first abrading the titanium to be bonded, coating the titanium with platinum. The titanium is then heated in an oven at 500 °C for several hours. A primer is then sprayed onto the coated titanium. Next, an adhesive is applied to the primer side of the titanium and then finally, the carbon is applied to the adhesive.

== Usage ==
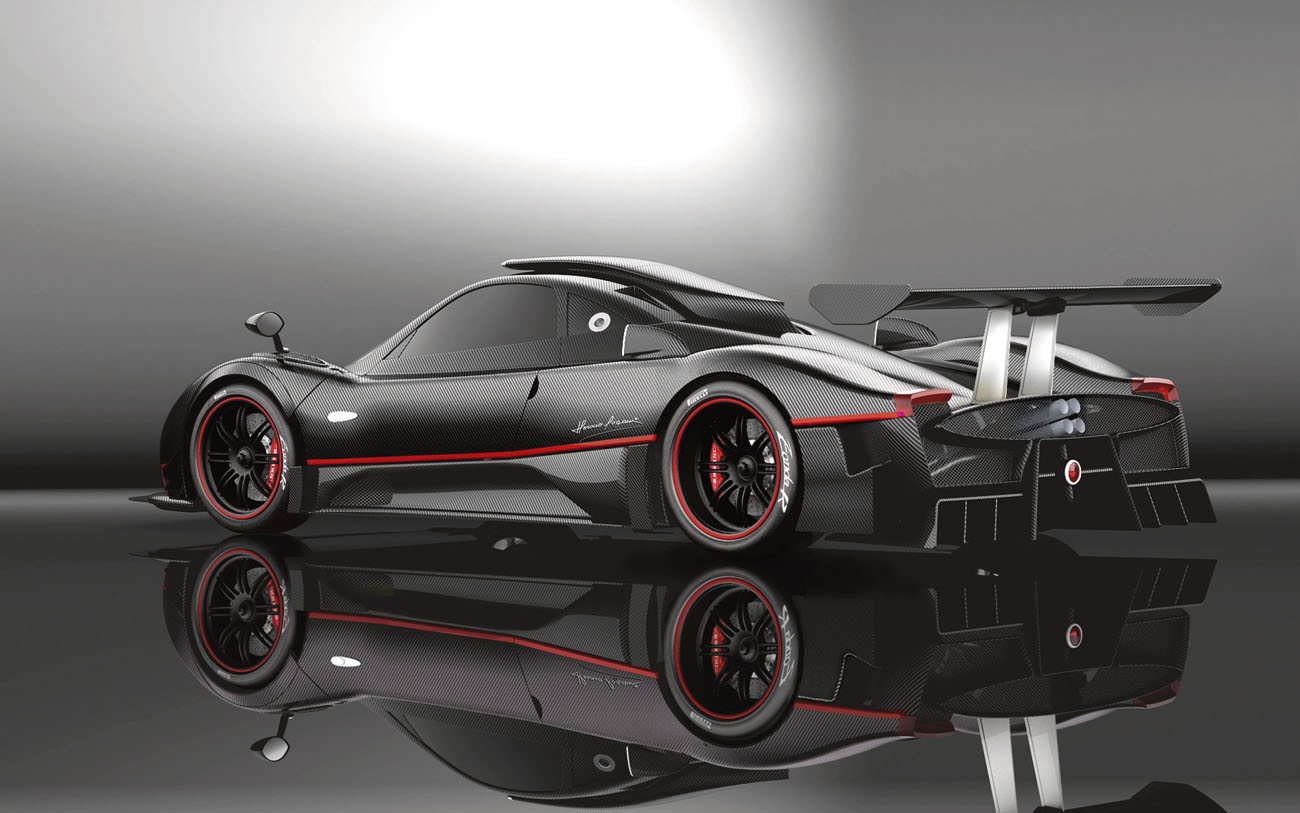
The Pagani Zonda R, which is made from carbotanium.

Carbotanium is a patented composite material invented by Modena Design, the carbon composite manufacturing and consultancy arm of the Italian car company Pagani. Pagani has applied this weave on select models of their extra strong and lightweight supercars, the Pagani Zonda R and Pagani Huayra. Although not all Pagani Zondas are manufactured to include carbotanium, some are built with carbon fibre structures and other variations of composite materials have been used.
