= Horacio Pagani (auto executive) =

Argentine-Italian auto executive

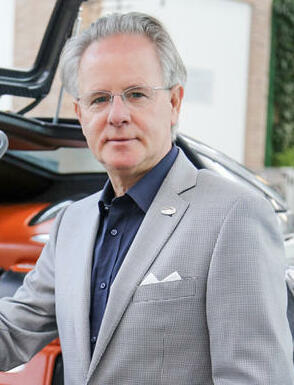
- Pagani in 2022
- Born: 10 November 1955 (age 70); Casilda, Santa Fe, Argentina
- Occupations: Automotive entrepreneur; Founder, Chairman Chief Designer & CEO of Pagani
- Children: 2

Horacio Pagani (born 10 November 1955) is an Argentine-Italian businessman and automobile engineer in the automotive industry. He is the Founder and Chairman of Pagani Automobili S.p.A., an Italian speciality automaker.

Prior to founding his own company, Pagani worked for Renault and Lamborghini.

== Personal life ==
Horacio Pagani was born in Casilda, Argentina, to Luca and Maria Pagani. His father, Luca, was a baker from Italy.

== Career ==
Pagani took an interest in engineering while still living in Argentina. However, he felt from the beginning that the rural town into which he was born was inadequate for fulfilling his dream of an engineering career. He opened a small shop where he worked at a very young age, gaining valuable experience in craftsmanship. By the age of 20, Pagani had designed and built his first F3 racer.

The turning point in Pagani's life came when he was hired by Renault to improve the body of a racing car. His work offered staggering improvements, and Pagani was able to showcase his talent. After having success on this small scale, Pagani visited Lamborghini and met with the company's chief technical director Giulio Alfieri. In 1982, he decided to move to Italy, and he was hired by Lamborghini. Pagani began working basic jobs such as sweeping floors, and in time he was able to work his way up the company.

He became the chief engineer at Lamborghini, and he built the Countach Evoluzione concept. He tried to persuade Lamborghini to buy an autoclave so they could extend the production of the carbon parts for the Evoluzione. They refused, saying that Ferrari did not have an autoclave, so Lamborghini didn't need to have one. Pagani borrowed the capital to buy his own autoclave late in 1987 and then, in 1991, he broke away from the company and founded his own consultancy called Modena Design which continues to make carbon fiber composites for Formula One cars and clients like Daimler, Ferrari and Aprilia.

Pagani Automobili Modena was founded by Horacio Pagani in 1992. The first car he produced was the Zonda, which took seven years to complete, followed by the Huayra, named after Huayra-tata, the god of the wind in Incan culture.

In 2025, Pagani received a Master’s degree ad honorem in Design & Engineering from the Polytechnic University of Milan. Following the ceremony, several Pagani automobiles remained on display in the foyer of the Polytechnic University’s Bovisa campus.

== Bibliography ==
- Morelli, Roberto, and Hugo Racca (2010). "Pagani, the Story of a Dream." Italy: Edizioni Arteimmagine. ISBN 978-8890508318.

Interviews and commentaries by Giampaolo Dallara, Valentino Balboni, and Gordon Murray.
