= Huayra =

Huayra may refer to:

- Huayra furnace, a traditional Andean smelting device
- Huayra-tata, an Andean wind god
- Pagani Huayra, a 2011 sports car
- Huayra Pronello Ford, a 1969 racing car
- Telmatobius huayra, a frog endemic to Bolivia
- Huayra GNU/Linux, a Linux distribution
