= Louis Schwitzer Award =

Engineering award for racing vehicle improvements

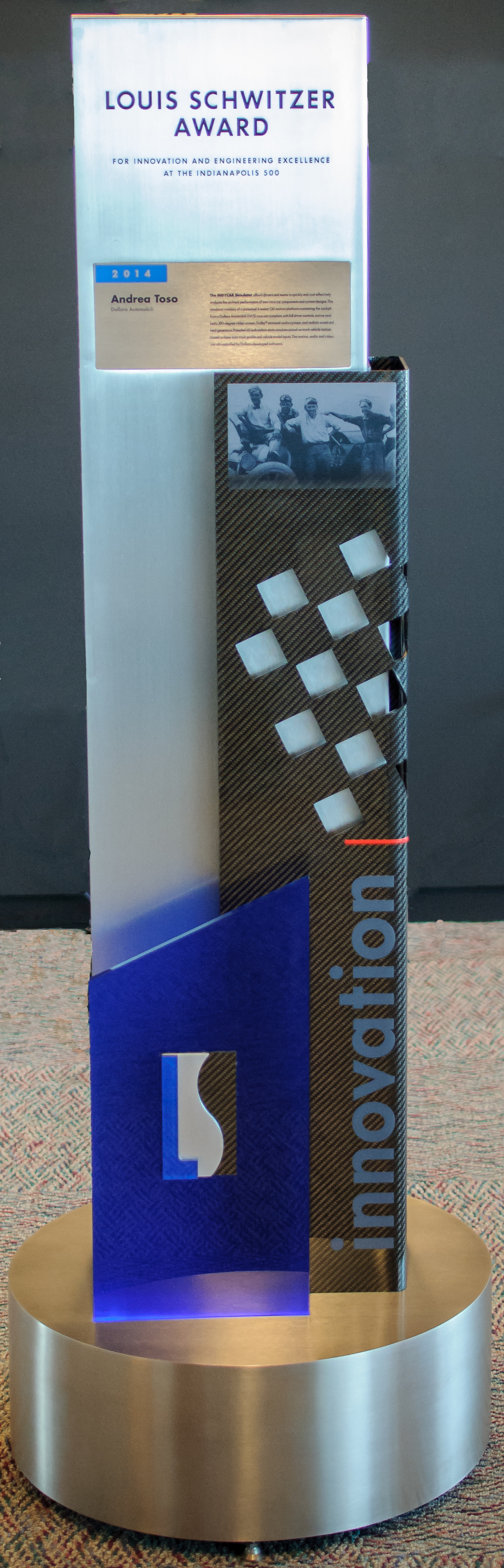
- The Louis Schwitzer Award trophy
- Awarded for: Awarded for excellence in motorsports engineering
- Sponsored by: Allison Transmission; Valvoline
- Location: Indianapolis Motor Speedway
- Country: United States
- First award: 1967

The Louis Schwitzer Award (also called the Louis H. Schwitzer Award for Engineering Innovation and Excellence) is presented by the Indiana Section of SAE International to an engineer or team of engineers "for their innovative design and engineering excellence" and acknowledges "engineers with the courage and conviction to explore and develop new concepts in racing technology" in racing vehicles for the Indianapolis 500. The accolade also distinguishes engineers who were most responsible for designing and developing the winning concept to comply to IndyCar Series technical regulations, and awards "functional and recent permutations" that improve energy efficiency, performance or safety in chassis, drive train profiles by "emphasizing competitive potential along with future automotive industry possibilities." Although the award specifically recognizes new concepts, experimental ideas arising from previous winners are considered if the development in engineering improves it.

It was established at the 1967 event and renamed after automotive engineer, inventor and former chairman of SAE International's Indiana Section Louis Schwitzer by SAE before the 1978 race. Schwitzer also won the first automobile race to be held at Indianapolis Motor Speedway in 1909. Each year before the Indianapolis 500, an Indiana Section SAE International members committee meet with IndyCar Series technical officials to identify potential candidates. The committee interviews candidates and votes to determine the winner. The Indiana Section of SAE International provides $10,000 prize money to the recipient or team, (Note: The cash prize was $1,000 but was later increased to $5,000.) who receive a plaque and have their names added to a permanent trophy on display at the Indianapolis Motor Speedway Museum. The presentation of the award is made annually at Indianapolis Motor Speedway before the Indianapolis 500. It is currently sponsored by Allison Transmission and Valvoline.

Since the award was first presented in 1967, there have been over 102 individual recipients. The inaugural winner was Andy Granatelli, who developed the gas-turbine run STP-Paxton Turbocar. The award has been presented for two concepts in a single year just once: in 1977, to Bob Bubenik and Bruce Crower for developing the automatic clutch and flat-eight engine, respectively. Two years later, John Barnard and Jim Hall were the first team to be recognized for designing the Chaparral 2K chassis for that year's Indianapolis 500. Since then, another 25 teams have been recognized. Firestone tire engineer Cara Adams became the first female recipient in the 2019 edition. The award has been presented posthumously once, to Don Burgoon in the 2017 race. The most recent honorees were senior aerodynamicist Andrea Bongiovanni, and designer Dominic Coffey in the 2026 event; they were recognized for their work on the design and development of the Dallara superspeedway rear tire ramp flaps.

== Recipients ==
Key
†	Indicates posthumous award

Louis Schwitzer Award winners
Year	Image	Winner(s)	Concept	Ref
1967	Andy Grantelli on a mobility scooter in the pit lane of a race track	Andy Granatelli	STP-Paxton Turbocar	
1968	Dan Gurney in racing overalls smiling at the camera	Dan Gurney	Low cost racing engine	
1969	Colin Chapman in a black and white photograph sporting a mustache and looking to the left of the camera	Colin Chapman	Lotus Type 64	
1970	Bruce McLaren in racing overalls looking slightly to the right of the camera	Bruce McLaren	McLaren M15	
1971	–	Josef Karasek	McNamara chassis	
1972	Dan Gurney in a black and white photograph wearing racing overalls	Dan Gurney	Eagle chassis	
1973	–	Smokey Yunick	Stock block engine	
1974	A. J. Foyt at the 2015 Indianapolis 500 looking to the right of the camera	A. J. Foyt	Coyote chassis	
1975	Parnelli Jones at the 2015 Indianapolis 500	Parnelli Jones	Parnelli VP6J chassis	
1976	–	Roman Slobodynskyj	Lightning chassis	
1977	–	Bob Bubenik	Automatic clutch	
1977	–	Bruce Crower	Flat-eight engine	
1978	–	Roman Slobodynskyj	Laydown Lightning chassis (Note: Finalists for the 1978 award were the American Kid Racer, the Chaparral Lola, the McCord Auto Finley, and the Gould Penske cars.)	
1979	John Barnard wearing a light blue striped shirt and a navy blue and beige tie	John Barnard	Chaparral 2K chassis	
1979	Jim Hall wearing rectangular glasses and a baby blue T-shirt with the top button undone	Jim Hall	Chaparral 2K chassis	
1980	The Penske PC-9 on display in the Collings Foundation	Geoff Ferris	Penske PC-9 chassis	
1981	–	John Ward	Eagle chassis	
1982	The side view of a blue, red and white racing car with the number 1 in white on its side being driven on a race track	Geoff Ferris	Penske PC-10 chassis	
1983	The Torsen differential taken from a road car	Vernon Gleasman	Gleason-Torsen differential (Note: Other nominees for the 1983 award were the Argo, the March 83C, the 1983 Eagle, the Lola T700, the Penske PC-11, and the Wildcat IX cars.)	
1984	A black and white photograph of Robin Herd looking at the right of the camera	Robin Herd	March 84C chassis (Note: The three finalists for the 1984 accolade were the March, the Lola, and the DSR1 cars.)	
1985	BuickV6Indycarengine	Ron Kociba	Buick V6 Turbo engine	
1985	BuickV6Indycarengine	Joe Negri	Buick V6 Turbo engine	
1986	Mario Illien sitting on a chair and talking to the press at a press conference	Mario Illien	Ilmor-Chevrolet V8 engine	
1987	–	Stuart Grant	Goodyear Racing radial tire	
1988	–	John Lindo	Tilton Carbon-Carbon clutch (Note: Other finalists for the 1988 award were the Penske chassis, the Porsche IndyCar engine and the safety foot box design.)	
1988	–	Ray Sorce	Tilton Carbon-Carbon clutch	
1989	–	Anthony Purnell	Intelligent dashboard	
1990	–	Luciano Aguirre	Beadall racing helmet	
1990	–	Tim Halsmer	Beadall racing helmet	
1990	–	Mike Held	Beadall racing helmet	
1990	Bill Simpson signing an autograph on a table	Bill Simpson	Beadall racing helmet	
1991	A red racing car adorned with sponsors logos and the number 11 in white on the front wing is primarily stationary in the shade and partially in sunlight	Don Halliday	Truesports 91C chassis	
1992	A black and white racing car adorned with sponsors logos and the number 3 in black on the front wing sitting in a museum	Alan Mertens	Galmer 9200 chassis	
1993	A red and white racing car with sponsors logos adorning it and the number 4 on the front wing sitting in a museum	Nigel Bennett	Penske PC22 chassis	
1994	Mario Illien on the grid wearing white clothing and looking to his right	Mario Illien	Mercedes-Benz 500I engine	
1995	–	Chris Munroe	Tire monitoring system	
1995	–	Don Nowicki	Tire monitoring system	
1996	–	Ed Rothrock	Racing EyeCue	
1996	–	Dave Schnelker	Racing EyeCue	
1996	–	I-Fu Shih	Racing EyeCue	
1996	–	Ning Wu	Racing EyeCue	
1997	–	Roger Allen	Oldsmobile Aurora V8 engine	
1997	–	Ed Keating	Oldsmobile Aurora V8 engine	
1998	–	John Melvin	GM Motorsports Safety Technology Research Program (Note: The 1998 nominees were the Delphi Delco Electronics Track Condition Radio, the Emco gearbox and the Riley & Scott chassis.)	
1998	–	John Pierce	GM Motorsports Safety Technology Research Program	
1999	Giampaolo Dallara speaking into a black microphone he is holding in his right hand with his left hand out	Giampaolo Dallara	Dallara chassis	
2000	The G-Force GF05 car painted in navy blue, orange and white	Paul Burgess	G-Force GF05 chassis	
2001	A black carbon fibre HANS device attached to the back of a racing helmet on a helmet anchor	Robert Hubbard	HANS device (Note: Announced nominees were the 2001 Dallara chassis, the 2001 G-Force chassis, the Infiniti engine and the IRL timing and scoring system.)	
2001	A black carbon fibre HANS device attached to the back of a racing helmet on a helmet anchor	Jim Downing	HANS device	
2002	A white-colored SAFER barrier retrofitted in front of a concrete wall	Ronald Faller	SAFER barrier (Note: The announced candidates were the Chevrolet Indy V8 engine, the Dallara 2002 chassis update kit, Delphi Accelerometers, and the Infiniti Indy 35A/E engine.)	
2002	A white-colored SAFER barrier retrofitted in front of a concrete wall	Jim Holloway	SAFER barrier	
2002	A white-colored SAFER barrier retrofitted in front of a concrete wall	John Reid	SAFER barrier	
2002	A white-colored SAFER barrier retrofitted in front of a concrete wall	John Rohde	SAFER barrier	
2002	A white-colored SAFER barrier retrofitted in front of a concrete wall	Dean Sicking	SAFER barrier	
2003	Giampaolo Dallara wearing a Tan blazer, white buttoned-up shirt and an orange tie	Giampaolo Dallara	Dallara IR3 chassis (Note: The Panoz G-Force GF09 chassis, the Honda H13R engine and the Toyota Indy V8 engine were nominated for the 2003 award.)	
2004	–	Steve Eriksen	Honda HI4R-A engine (Note: The Dallara IR4 chassis, the 2004 Delphi IndyCar Safety Truck, the Chevrolet Indy V8 engine and the Panoz G-Force GF09B chassis earned nominations for the 2004 accolade.)	
2004	–	Steve Miller	Honda HI4R-A engine	
2004	–	Steve O'Connor	Honda HI4R-A engine	
2004	–	Yasuhide Sakamoto	Honda HI4R-A engine	
2005	–	Erskine Carter	Delphi Earpiece sensor system (Note: The Panoz Chassis Update Kit, the Chevrolet IRL engine, the Honda IRL engine and the Team Penske Rear Wing Adjustment System were announced as nominees for the award.)	
2005	–	Glen Gray	Delphi Earpiece sensor system	
2005	–	Andy Inman	Delphi Earpiece sensor system	
2005	–	Tim Kronenberg	Delphi Earpiece sensor system	
2005	–	Bruce Natvig	Delphi Earpiece sensor system	
2006	–	Thomas German	Rear wing adjuster tool	
2006	–	Justin Horning	Rear wing adjuster tool	
2006	–	Tom Janiczek	Rear wing adjuster tool	
2007	–	Erskine Carter	Delphi Accident data recorder 3 (Note: The nominees for the award were Ethanol racing fuel, the Honda H17R Engine, and the Firestone Firehawk Indy 500 Tire.)	
2007	–	Glen Gray	Delphi Accident data recorder 3	
2007	–	Andy Inman	Delphi Accident data recorder 3	
2007	–	Tim Kronenberg	Delphi Accident data recorder 3	
2007	–	Bruce Natvig	Delphi Accident data recorder 3	
2008	–	Nick Belonogoff	Variable ratio rack and pinion steering technology	
2008	–	Andrew Heathershaw	Variable ratio rack and pinion steering technology	
2008	–	Andrea Toso	Variable ratio rack and pinion steering technology	
2008	–	Soungjin Wou	Variable ratio rack and pinion steering technology	
2009	–	Jeff Horton	Head and neck support extension	
2010	–	Charles Becnel	Mezzo microChannel radiator	
2010	–	Tino Belli	Mezzo microChannel radiator	
2010	–	Patrick Luke	Mezzo microChannel radiator	
2010	–	Christophe Marques	Mezzo microChannel radiator	
2011	–	Robert Bell	Honda refueling safety interlock system	
2011	–	James Goodloe	Honda refueling safety interlock system	
2011	–	Roger Griffiths	Honda refueling safety interlock system	
2011	–	Marcelo Martinelli	Honda refueling safety interlock system	
2012	–	Steve O'Connor	Chevrolet IndyCar V6 Engine (Note: The BorgWarner turbochargers, the Dallara DW12 chassis, the Honda HI12R V6 engine, Lotus Indy V6 engine and the Xtrac transmission were announced as nominees for the 2012 award.)	
2012	–	Mark Kent	Chevrolet IndyCar V6 Engine	
2012	–	Steve Miller	Chevrolet IndyCar V6 Engine	
2012	–	Matt Wiles	Chevrolet IndyCar V6 Engine	
2013	–	Dale Harrigle	Firestone Firehawk Indy 500 Race Tire	
2013	–	Brett Schilling	Firestone Firehawk Indy 500 Race Tire	
2014	The Dallara Advance Driving Simulator inside a building	Andrea Toso	Dallara Advanced Driving Simulator	
2015	A red racing car adorned with sponsors logos on pit road is being pushed back into the garage	Chris Berube	2015 Chevrolet Aero Kit	
2015	A red racing car adorned with sponsors logos on pit road is being pushed back into the garage	Mark Kent	2015 Chevrolet Aero Kit	
2015	A red racing car adorned with sponsors logos on pit road is being pushed back into the garage	Aaron Melvin	2015 Chevrolet Aero Kit	
2015	A red racing car adorned with sponsors logos on pit road is being pushed back into the garage	Charles Ping	2015 Chevrolet Aero Kit	
2016	–	Tino Belli	Rear Beam Wing Flap	
2016	–	Aaron Melvin	Rear Beam Wing Flap	
2016	–	Alex Timmermans	Rear Beam Wing Flap	
2017	–	James Borner	PFC Carbon Disc Brake System	
2017	–	Don Burgoon †	PFC Carbon Disc Brake System	
2017	–	Darin Cate	PFC Carbon Disc Brake System	
2017	–	Paul Rankin	PFC Carbon Disc Brake System	
2017	–	Mark Wagner	PFC Carbon Disc Brake System	
2018	A red, white and blue racing car being driven at high speed on an oval race track	Chris Beatty	Dallara DW12 UAK18 Universal Aero Kit	
2018	A red, white and blue racing car being driven at high speed on an oval race track	Tino Belli	Dallara DW12 UAK18 Universal Aero Kit	
2018	A red, white and blue racing car being driven at high speed on an oval race track	Antonio Montanari	Dallara DW12 UAK18 Universal Aero Kit	
2018	A red, white and blue racing car being driven at high speed on an oval race track	Andrea Toso	Dallara DW12 UAK18 Universal Aero Kit	
2019	–	Cara Adams	Firestone Firehawk Indy 500 race tire	
2019	–	Brett Schilling	Firestone Firehawk Indy 500 race tire	
2019	–	Phil Severyn	Firestone Firehawk Indy 500 race tire	
2020	–	Tino Belli	IndyCar Aeroscreen cockpit protection device	
2020	–	Marco Bertolini	IndyCar Aeroscreen cockpit protection device	
2020	–	Ed Collings	IndyCar Aeroscreen cockpit protection device	
2020	–	Craig McCarthy	IndyCar Aeroscreen cockpit protection device	
2020	–	Antonio Montanari	IndyCar Aeroscreen cockpit protection device	
2020	–	Bill Pappas	IndyCar Aeroscreen cockpit protection device	
2020	–	Stefan Seidel	IndyCar Aeroscreen cockpit protection device	
2020	–	Brent Wright	IndyCar Aeroscreen cockpit protection device	
2021	–	Terry Trammell	Biomedical engineering for driver safety	
2022	–	Luca De Angelis	EM Marshalling System	
2022	–	Luca Pierrettori	EM Marshalling System	
2022	–	Taylor Prohaska	EM Marshalling System	
2022	–	Simone Pusca	EM Marshalling System	
2023	–	Selda Gunsel	Shell 100% Renewable Race Fuel	
2023	–	Bassem Kheireddin	Shell 100% Renewable Race Fuel	
2023	–	Jung Fang	Shell 100% Renewable Race Fuel	
2024	–	Andrew McDougall	Xtrac Electric Servo Actuator	
2025	–	Rupert Tull de Salis	INDYCAR Hybrid Power Unit	
2025	–	Matt Niles	INDYCAR Hybrid Power Unit	
2025	–	John Martin	INDYCAR Hybrid Power Unit	
2025	–	Raoul Fernandes	INDYCAR Hybrid Power Unit	
2025	–	Darren Sansum	INDYCAR Hybrid Power Unit	
2025	–	Thomas Williams	INDYCAR Hybrid Power Unit	
2026	–	Andrea Bongiovanni	Dallara superspeedway rear tire ramp flaps	
2026	–	Dominic Coffey	Dallara superspeedway rear tire ramp flaps	

== Statistics ==
Multiple winners
Name	Wins
Tino Belli	4
Andrea Toso	3
Erskine Carter	2
Giampaolo Dallara	2
Geoff Ferris	2
Glen Gray	2
Dan Gurney	2
Mario Illien	2
Andy Inman	2
Mark Kent	2
Tim Kronenberg	2
Aaron Melvin	2
Steve Miller	2
Antonio Montanari	2
Bruce Natvig	2
Steve O'Connor	2
Brett Schilling	2
Roman Slobodynskyj	2

== See also ==
- List of motor vehicle awards
- PACE Award
