= G.W. Jones Building =

- U.S. National Register of Historic Places
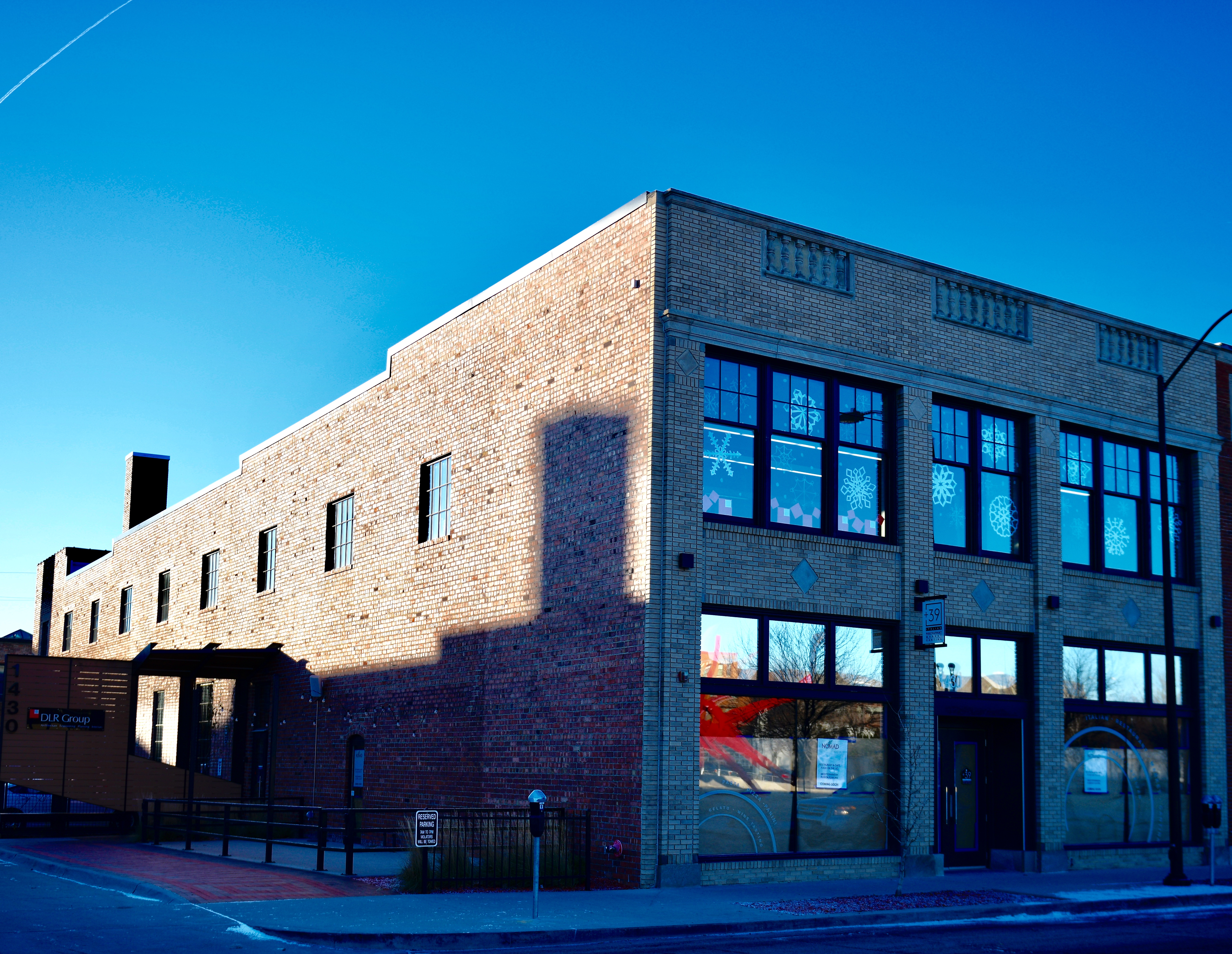

- Location within Iowa Location within the United States
- Location: 1436-42 Locust St. Des Moines, Iowa
- Coordinates: 41°35′03.2″N 93°38′09.3″W
- Area: less than one acre
- Built: 1920
- Built by: A.H. Neumann
- Architect: Proudfoot, Bird & Rawson
- Architectural style: Commercial; Classical Revival
- MPS: Architectural Legacy of Proudfoot & Bird in Iowa MPS
- NRHP reference No.: 16000364
- Added to NRHP: June 14, 2016

The G.W. Jones Building, also known as the Electric Farm Lighting Co. and the Laster Motor Company, is a historic building located in Des Moines, Iowa, United States. It is significant for its association with the rise of the automobile industry in the city. George W. Jones was a pioneering Des Moines auto dealer (Hudson Motor Car Company) and Delco-Light generator distributor who occupied the building from 1920 to 1922. In this building he sold generators and appliances that were manufactured by General Motors, and they were sold by regional distributor-dealers in a similar fashion to automobiles. Jones continued to own the building until 1943 and he leased it to other automobile-related businesses. It is also significant for its association with the prominent Des Moines architectural firm that designed it, Proudfoot, Bird & Rawson. Completed in 1920, it was designed and built within the period of time the firm was at its most prolific (1910-1925). Local contractor A.H. Neumann built the two-story brick structure. It features a symmetrical facade, large square window openings, restrained Neoclassical details, and parapet walls. The building was listed on the National Register of Historic Places in 2016.
