= Gary Dickinson =

American automotive industry executive (1938–2000)

Gary W. Dickinson (May 12, 1938 – March 26, 2000) was an automotive industry executive.

== Early life ==
Dickinson was born in Cedar Grove, New Jersey, United States on May 12, 1938. He had a mother named Esther, and two brothers, Allan and Roger. Dickinson's first job was as a lifeguard in Lancaster, Pennsylvania.

== Education ==
Dickinson graduated from Duke University with a Bachelor of Science in mechanical engineering in 1960. He later served as a member and president of the Dean's Council for the School of Engineering. In 1988, Dickinson was honored with Duke's Distinguished Alumni Award.

== Career ==
He joined General Motors following graduation and developed automotive emissions control systems at the GM Proving Ground in Milford, Michigan, and El Segundo, California.

Dickinson became GM's first congressional assistant with the National Industrial Conference Board in 1976 and worked with then Senator Robert Dole as a staff member on the Senate Budget Committee. "Among his many contributions was his work in Washington, DC where he opened new avenues of dialogue and understanding for the industry with legislators and regulators on emissions standards." said Robert C. Stempel, retired GM chairman. Following this assignment, he became assistant chief engineer for Buick Motor Division in Flint, Michigan, and was appointed director of engineering for AC Spark Plug Division (now called Delphi Energy & Management Systems) in 1982.

In 1984, Dickinson was appointed program manager for the development of a new line of mid-size GM cars, and in 1985 was elected a GM vice president. Promoted to group vice president of the GM Technical Staffs in 1989, Dickinson managed GM Research Laboratories, Design Staff and Advanced Engineering Staff, including all GM proving grounds. Dickinson led the development of GM's four phase vehicle development program which has become the company's global protocol for designing and building its vehicles.

In January 1993, Dickinson was appointed president of Delco Electronics Corporation, Subsidiary of GM Hughes Electronics, and executive vice president of General Motors Hughes Electronics . He served in these positions until his retirement on January 1, 1997. At Delco Electronics, Dickinson gave his staff 100 days to help him figure out how to restructure the company for dramatic global growth. The goal was to cut costs by at least 10 percent annually and generate 40 percent of revenue from non-GM customers in seven years. To help accomplish this, Dickinson hired the Boston Consulting Group and with their help, set up an aggressive program of Business Process Engineering per the teachings of the reengineering proponent, Michael Hammer. Many of the teachings of reengineering were applied to the Delco Electronics organization such as cross-functional teams and competency centers.

To raise the profile of the relatively unknown automotive electronics company, Dickinson used Delco Electronics' involvement in motorsports electronics to sponsor the Indianapolis 500 Festival Parade and a Delco Electronics race team. Dickinson entered his 1938 Good Humor Ice Cream truck in the 1995 parade which resulted in an invitation to appear on the Regis and Kathie Lee talk show. Dickinson was responsible for sponsoring the "Delco Electronics "500" Festival Parade" every year he was at Delco Electronics (1993–1996). Delco Electronics also sponsored the 1997 parade, but named it the "Monsoon "500" Festival Parade" ("Monsoon" was a Delco Electronics after-market brand).

Dickinson helped start Nonlinear Dynamic Inc and served as its chairman of the board since inception.

== Other positions ==
- Lotus Cars – Former director
- GME Robotics – Former director
- Penske Motorsports Inc. – Former director (March 1997 start)
- MacKinnon Associates, Bloomfield Hills, Michigan – Former principal
- Society of Automotive Engineers (SAE) – Chairman of the Vision 2000 Advisory Committee that developed "A World in Motion Challenges 2 and 3". Dickinson was also actively involved with "Mobility Technology Planning Forums", which brought a future technology focus to the SAE. He was in a leadership role for SAE student competitions: the Methanol Marathon, the NGV Challenge, and the Solar Car Race. In recognition of his outstanding achievements, Dickinson was awarded the SAE Medal of Honor in 1994, and the Long-Term Leadership Award in 2000. The SAE established an annual award in 2001 called the "Gary Dickinson Award for Teaching Excellence". This award ($2,000) is funded by the SAE Detroit Section to commemorate the life of Gary Dickinson, and is intended to foster math and science education for middle school students.
