= Penske PC-10 =

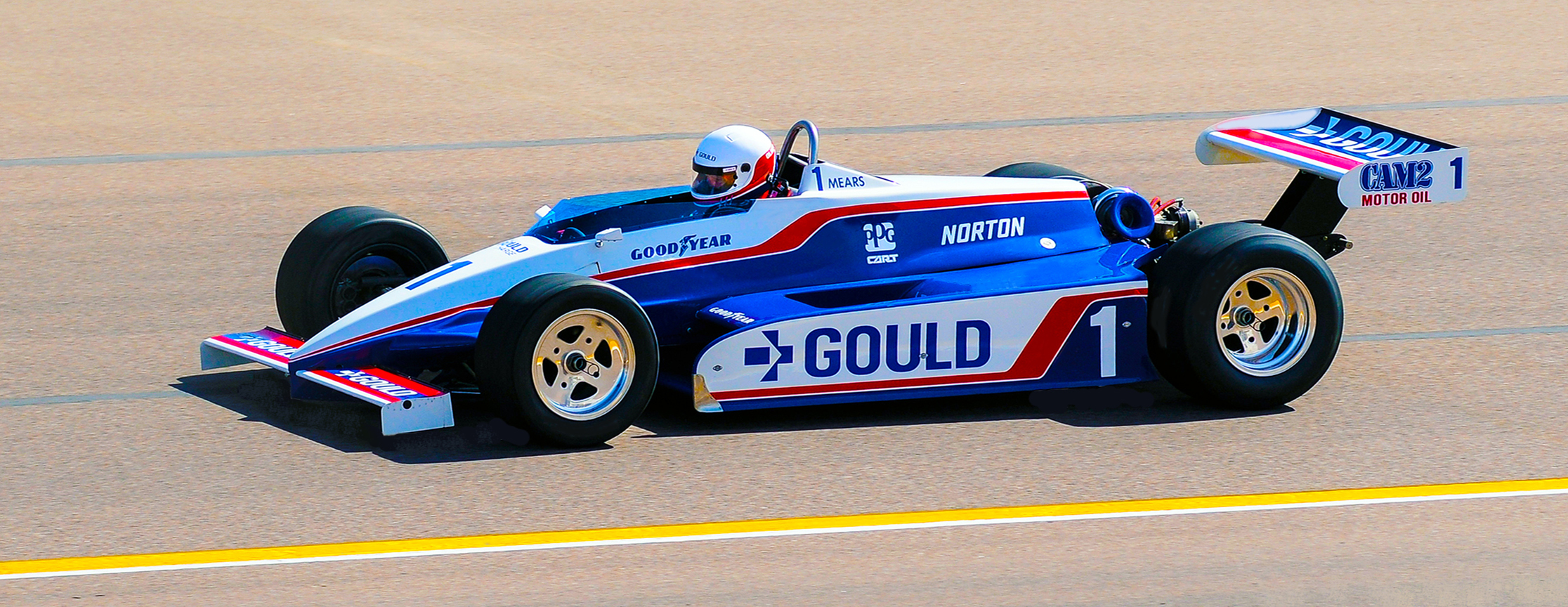
- Category: CART IndyCar
- Constructor: Penske
- Designer: Geoff Ferris
- Predecessor: Penske PC-9
- Successor: Penske PC-11

Technical specifications
- Chassis: Aluminum Monocoque
- Suspension: Inboard springs and Fox shocks front and rear, operated by top rocker arm with front and lower rear A arms of streamline tubing
- Engine: Cosworth DFX 2,650 cc (161.7 cu in) V8 80° Mid-engined, longitudinally mounted
- Transmission: Hewland V.G. 4 speed manual
- Weight: 1,550 lb (703.1 kg)
- Fuel: Methanol, supplied by Mobil
- Tyres: Goodyear Eagle Speedway Specials - Rear 27.0x14.5-15 - Front 25.5x10.0-15

Competition history
- Notable entrants: Penske Racing
- Notable drivers: Rick Mears; Kevin Cogan

The Penske PC-10 is a CART open-wheel race car, designed by Penske Racing, which was constructed for competition in the 1982 season. Designed by Geoff Ferris, it is considered possibly the most dominant Penske race car design ever and that from a team that typically dominated. Rick Mears has been quoted as acknowledging this was his favorite racecar chassis ever. Twelve total were made (1-12), six raced by Penske (1-6), with four confirmed destroyed (4, 7, 8, 11). They were manufactured at Penske Cars, Ltd. in Poole, England during 1982, and delivered to Penske Racing, Inc., in Reading, Pennsylvania. So outstanding was the PC-10's design, it won the prestigious Louis Schwitzer Award for innovation and engineering excellence in the field of race car design at the Indianapolis 500 in 1982. The PC-10s were active in the years 1982–1984. In fact, the PC-10 was ultimately much better than the following year PC-11, so Roger Penske bought back one of the PC-10s he had sold to another team for the 1983 season, and which then won another race for his team.

The PC-10s were driven for Roger Penske by Rick Mears and Kevin Cogan in the Championship Auto Racing Teams (CART) Series in 1982. Mears campaigned the car as the GOULD CHARGE car (red-blue-white), and in which he again won the CART Championship. It carried number 1 when Mears drove it as he was also the previous year's champion in 1981. When Cogan drove the car it carried the NORTON livery (yellow-blue-white) and carried the number 4.

The PC-10s were powered by the 2.6-liter Cosworth DFX turbocharged engine, delivering as high as 840 bhp. The DFX engine was the Indy car version of the highly successful 3-liter Cosworth DFV Formula One engine developed by former Lotus engineer Keith Duckworth and Colin Chapman, with financial backing from Ford for the Lotus 49 to campaign the 1967 season. This engine had 155 wins between 1967 and 1985 in F1. The DFX variant was initially developed for Indy car use by Parnelli Jones in 1976, with Cosworth soon taking over. This engine won the Indianapolis 500 ten consecutive years from 1978 to 1987, as well as winning all USAC and CART championships between 1977 and 1987. It powered 81 consecutive Indy car victories from 1981 to 1986, with 153 Indy car victories total.

== Racing history ==
=== 1982 ===
Mears and Cogan accumulated many race wins and poles during this season, with Mears ultimately winning the CART Championship as he had the previous year. Mears had nine pole positions and four race wins while Cogan had two pole positions. Cogan finished sixth in the championship points.

INDY 500 – PC-10's were involved in two notable moments of the race. Mears started the Indy 500 on the pole in his PC-10 with Cogan right next to him. Mears finished the race in second place only 0.16 seconds behind Gordon Johncock in his Patrick Racing Wildcat Mk8B #20. At the time, it was the closet Indy 500 finish.

Cogan was involved in the start of the race incident with Mario Andretti and A. J. Foyt. Foyt was able to restart the race after the red flag, but Andretti, a crowd favorite, was unable to repair his Patrick Wildcat Mk8B #40 in time. It has been suggested that Cogan broke a half-shaft under the force of acceleration due to the slower than normal start. Two other cars driven by Dale Whittington and Roger Mears farther back in the pack also collided and were out of the race. Cogan was blamed for the accident that eliminated four cars from the 1982 Indy 500. Kevin's racing career never fully recovered from this incident, although he did have his only Indy car win in 1986 and finished second in the Indy 500 that same year.

=== 1983 ===
Al Unser Sr. won the CART Championship driving a modified PC-10 renamed the PC-10B the later half of the season. Aerodynamic devices known as skirts (a carbon fiber piece that ran a long the outer lower edge of the side pods to capture air and increase downforce in conjunction with the venturi underbody of the car) had been legal the previous year were outlawed for the 1983 CART season.

Midway through the 1983 CART season Penske Racing determined that the new Penske PC-11 had some undesirable aero and handling characteristics that could not be remedied. This was determined after the Norton Michigan 500 (July 17 at the Michigan International Speedway) where Rick Mears lost control and wrecked after getting passed for the win on the last lap by John Paul Jr, ironically driving a PC-10. Penske Racing choose to finish out the season with the PC-10B with its modifications in accordance with the rules change. Al Unser Sr. won only one race (the Budweiser Cleveland 500 driving the PC-11) but had consistent high placing finishes throughout the season (10 top 5 finishes in 13 races).

Returning to the Michigan International Speedway late in the season for the Detroit News Grand Prix (September 18, 1983), Rick Mears would win his only race of the season having replaced the PC-11 in favor of the PC-10B.

INDY 500 – Al Unser Sr. finished 2nd and Rick Mears third driving PC-11s.

=== Other teams that raced the PC-10 ===
In 1983 the Arciero Racing, Machinists Union Racing and VDS Racing acquired Penske PC-10s to race that season. While these cars were modified to be in accordance with CART/USAC (Indy 500) rules for the 1983 season, these cars were not designated as PC-10Bs. Only cars directly affiliated with Penske Racing had that designation specifically.

Arciero Racing with Pete Halsmer would compete for the entire 1983 CART season with exception to the Indy 500 where Halsmer failed to qualify. He finished the season 11th in the point standings. Johnny Parsons Jr would join the team for the Indy 500 where he qualified a PC-10B (purchased from Penske during qualifications after their primary PC-10 had been wrecked) starting 23rd and finishing 22nd in the race. Parsons would return to the team one more time for the Norton Michigan 500 where he finished 30th.

Machinists Union Racing raced most of the 1983 CART season with drivers Roger Mears and Josele Garza driving PC-10s (modified). Roger Mears would race all races on the CART schedule with exception to the Norton Michigan 500 where he failed to qualify. He would finish the season in 12th place. Josele Garza would miss the races at Atlanta, Milwaukee and Phoenix and finish the season in 22nd place. His best finish of the season was 9th at the Pocono 500.

VDS Racing would race the majority of the 1983 CART season with John Paul Jr driving for the team. John Paul Jr would fail to qualify for the Indy 500 and the team did not participate at Milwaukee a week later. However, John Paul Jr won a victory for the team at the Norton Michigan 500 passing Rick Mears in the closing laps of the race. He would finish the season in 8th place in the standings. Driver Geoff Brabham would join the team for 6 races over the course of the 1983 CART season with his best finish a 4th at the Indy 500.

For the 1984 CART season Arciero Racing, Machinists Union Racing, VDS Racing and MacCray Racing started the season with PC-10s. Of all these teams only Machinists Union would race the entire CART season but switched from the 2 year old Penske PC-10 in favor of a new March 84C chassis after 2 races for full time driver Josele Garza. Roger Mears would attempt to qualify the PC-10 at Indy (his only race of the season) but failed to qualify for the race.

Arciero Racing would similarly retire the PC-10 after 4 races for driver Pete Halsmer. VDS Racing would race the PC-10 for the majority of the 1984 CART season for drivers John Paul Jr. and Chet Phillip. Neither driver would qualify for the Indy 500 but John Paul Jr would take a 3rd-place finish in the last race of the season at the Caesar's Palace GP, the best result for any team driving the PC-10 in the 1984 CART season.

MacCray Racing campaigned most of the 1984 CART season utilizing the PC-10 with a number of drivers in the car. Johnny Parsons raced the first two races of the season failing to qualify at Long Beach but finished 17th at the Dana Jimmy Bryan 150 (Phoenix). Jerry Karl drove at Indy but failed to qualify for the Indy 500 but finished 24th for the team at the Detroit News GP. Randy Lewis would attempt to qualify for 3 races but only succeeded and finish 26th at the Budweiser Cleveland GP. Peter Kuhn would drive for the team at four races, qualifying for three of them with a best finish of 16th at the Detroit News GP.

No PC-10 or PC-10Bs would qualify or compete in the 1985 Indy 500 or CART season.
