= Childers Farmstead =

Historic house in Arkansas, United States

- U.S. National Register of Historic Places
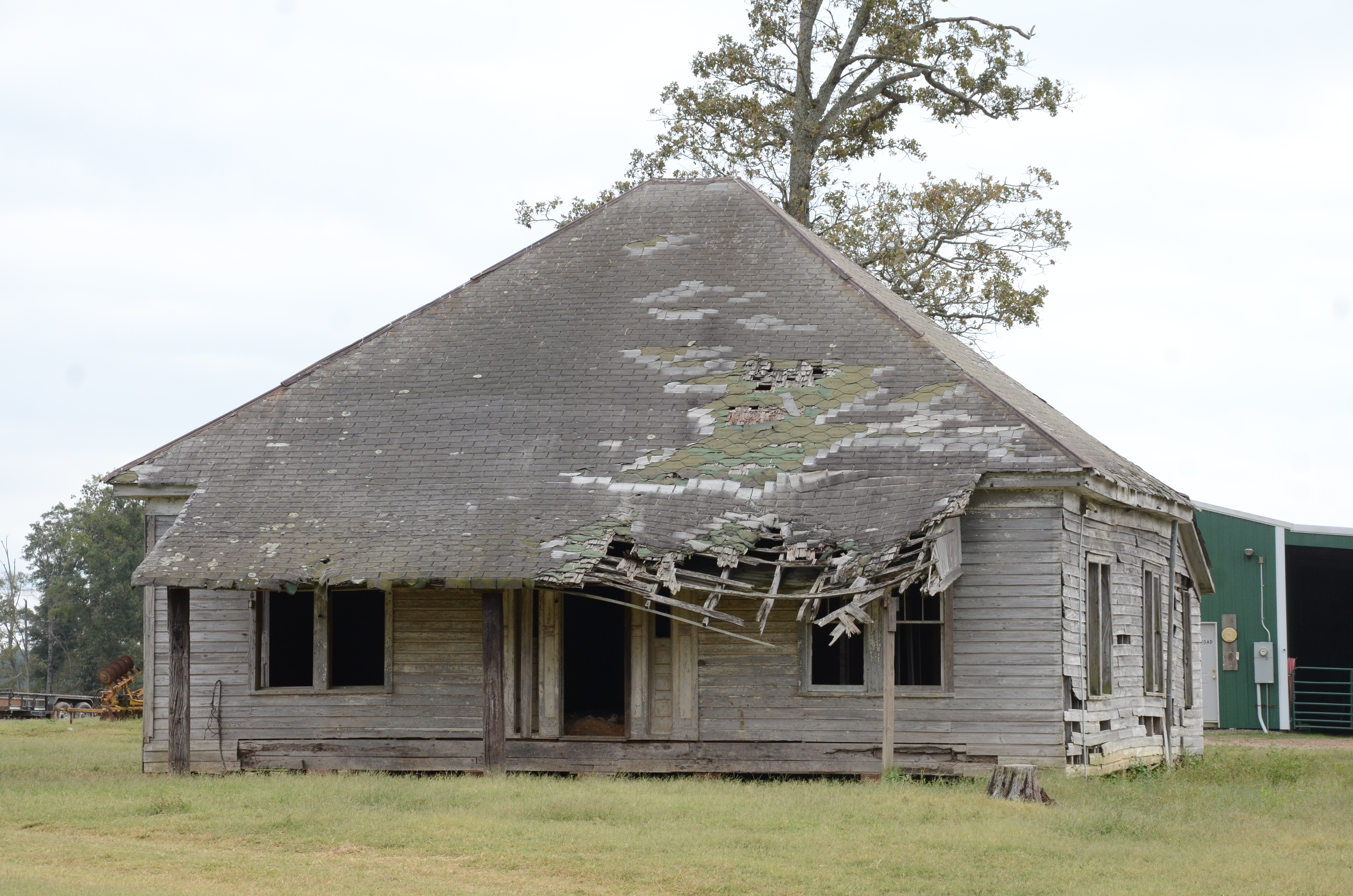

- Location within Arkansas Location within the United States
- Nearest city: McRae, Arkansas
- Coordinates: 35°5′38″N 91°49′39″W
- Area: 7 acres (2.8 ha)
- Built: 1925
- Architectural style: Bungalow/craftsman, Greek Revival, Vernacular Greek Revival
- MPS: White County MPS
- NRHP reference No.: 91001349
- Added to NRHP: July 11, 1992

The Childers Farmstead is a historic farm property in rural southern White County, Arkansas. It is located south of McRae, near the junction of Bowman and Rip Kirk Roads. The farmstead includes three buildings: the main house, a large barn, and a small "Delco house", originally built to house electricity generation equipment provided by Delco Electronics. The main house is a vernacular single story wood-frame structure, with a hip roof and a shed-roof porch extending across its main (northern) facade. That facade is symmetrically arranged, with Craftsman-style windows on either side of the entrance, which is flanked by half-length sidelights. The house was built about 1925, and is an unusual example of a retro version of Greek Revival architecture with Craftsman features. It was torn down in 2020.

The property was listed on the National Register of Historic Places in 1992.

== See also ==
- National Register of Historic Places listings in White County, Arkansas
