= Pagani Huayra =

Mid-engine sports car by Pagani

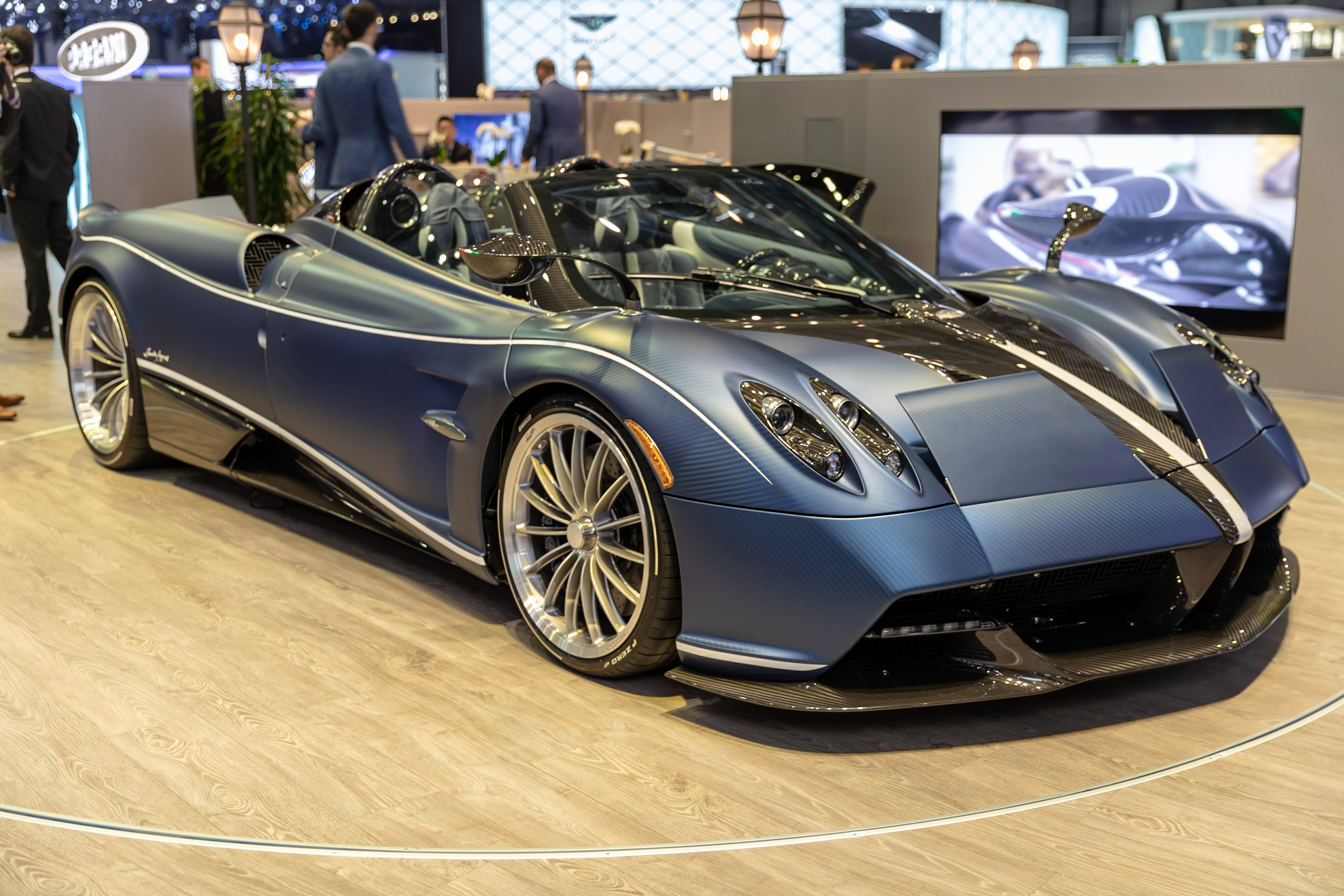
- Pagani Huayra Roadster

Overview
- Manufacturer: Pagani Automobili
- Production: 2011–2018 (Huayra; 100 units); 2017–2019 (Huayra BC; 29 units); 2017–2020 (Huayra Roadster; 100 units); 2019–2022 (Huayra Roadster BC; 40 units); 2019–2021 (Imola; 5 units); 2020–2022 (Huayra Tricolore; 3 units); 2021–2026 (Huayra R; 30 units); 2022 (Huayra Codalunga; 5 units); 2023–2026 (Imola Roadster; 8 units); 2025–2026 (Huayra R Evo); (number of units does not include prototypes)
- Assembly: Italy: San Cesario sul Panaro
- Designer: Horacio Pagani

Body and chassis
- Class: Sports car (S)
- Body style: 2-door coupe 2-door roadster
- Layout: Rear mid-engine, rear-wheel-drive
- Doors: Gull-wing (coupé); Butterfly (R)
- Related: Pagani Zonda R

Powertrain
- Engine: 5,980 cc (365 cu in; 6 L) Mercedes-AMG M158 twin-turbo V12; 5,987 cc (365 cu in; 6 L) Mercedes-Benz HWA AG V12 (Huayra R, R Evo)
- Power output: 740 PS (544 kW; 730 hp) (Huayra); 764 PS (562 kW; 754 hp) (Huayra BC); 764 PS (562 kW; 754 hp) (Huayra Roadster); 802 PS (590 kW; 791 hp) (Huayra Roadster BC); 838 PS (616 kW; 827 hp) (Imola); 840 PS (618 kW; 829 hp) (Huayra Tricolore & Huayra Codalunga); 850 PS (625 kW; 838 hp) (Huayra R); 850 PS (625 kW; 838 hp) (Imola Roadster); 900 PS (662 kW; 888 hp) (Huayra R Evo)
- Transmission: 7-speed Xtrac 1007 MT manual (Huayra Epitome); 7-speed Xtrac 1007 AMT automated manual; 6-speed sequential manual (Huayra R, R Evo)

Dimensions
- Wheelbase: 2,795 mm (110.0 in)
- Length: 4,625 mm (182.1 in)
- Width: 2,036 mm (80.2 in)
- Height: 1,169 mm (46.0 in)
- Curb weight: Dry weight: 1,350 kg (2,976 lb) (Huayra); 1,218 kg (2,685 lb) (Huayra BC); 1,280 kg (2,822 lb) (Huayra Roadster); 1,250 kg (2,756 lb) (Huayra Roadster BC); 1,246 kg (2,747 lb) (Imola); 1,270 kg (2,800 lb) (Huayra Tricolore); 1,050 kg (2,315 lb) (Huayra R); 1,280 kg (2,822 lb) (Huayra Codalunga); 1,260 kg (2,778 lb) (Imola Roadster); 1,060 kg (2,337 lb) (Huayra R Evo)

Chronology
- Predecessor: Pagani Zonda
- Successor: Pagani Utopia

The Pagani Huayra (WHY-rah, Italian pronunciation: [ˈwaira]) is a mid-engine sports car produced by Italian sports car manufacturer Pagani Automobili, superseding the company's previous offering, the Zonda. It is named after Wayra Tata, the Quechua (indigenous South American) wind god. The Huayra was named "The Hypercar of the Year 2012" by Top Gear magazine. On 11 February 2015 it was reported that the Pagani Huayra had been sold out. The Huayra was limited to just 100 units as part of Pagani's agreement with engine supplier Mercedes-AMG.

The Pagani Huayra was officially debuted online with several pictures in a press release on 25 January 2011. The official world debut was at the headquarters of Pirelli in Milan in February 2011.

== Specifications ==
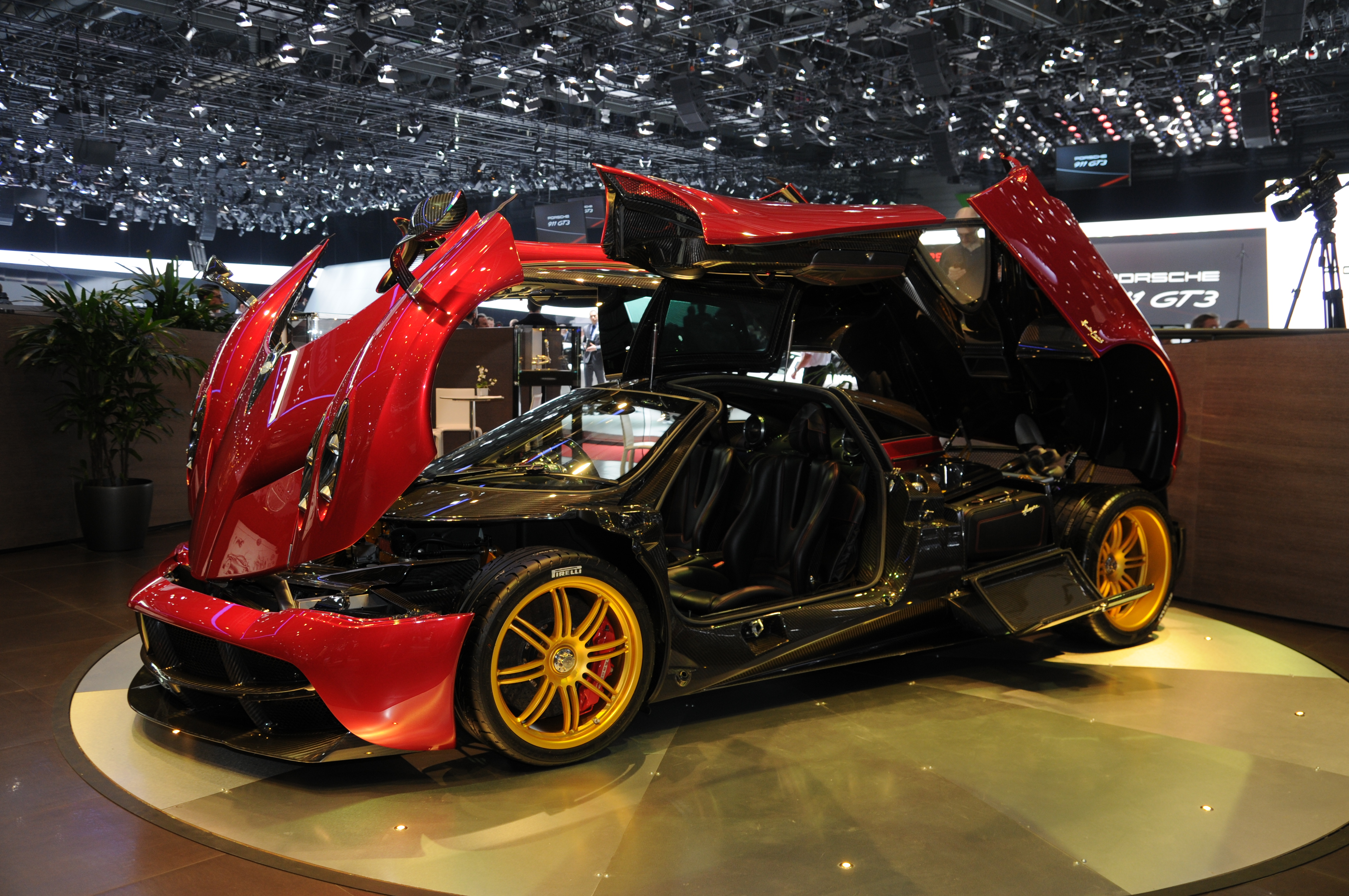
A Pagani Huayra on display with all user accessible compartments open

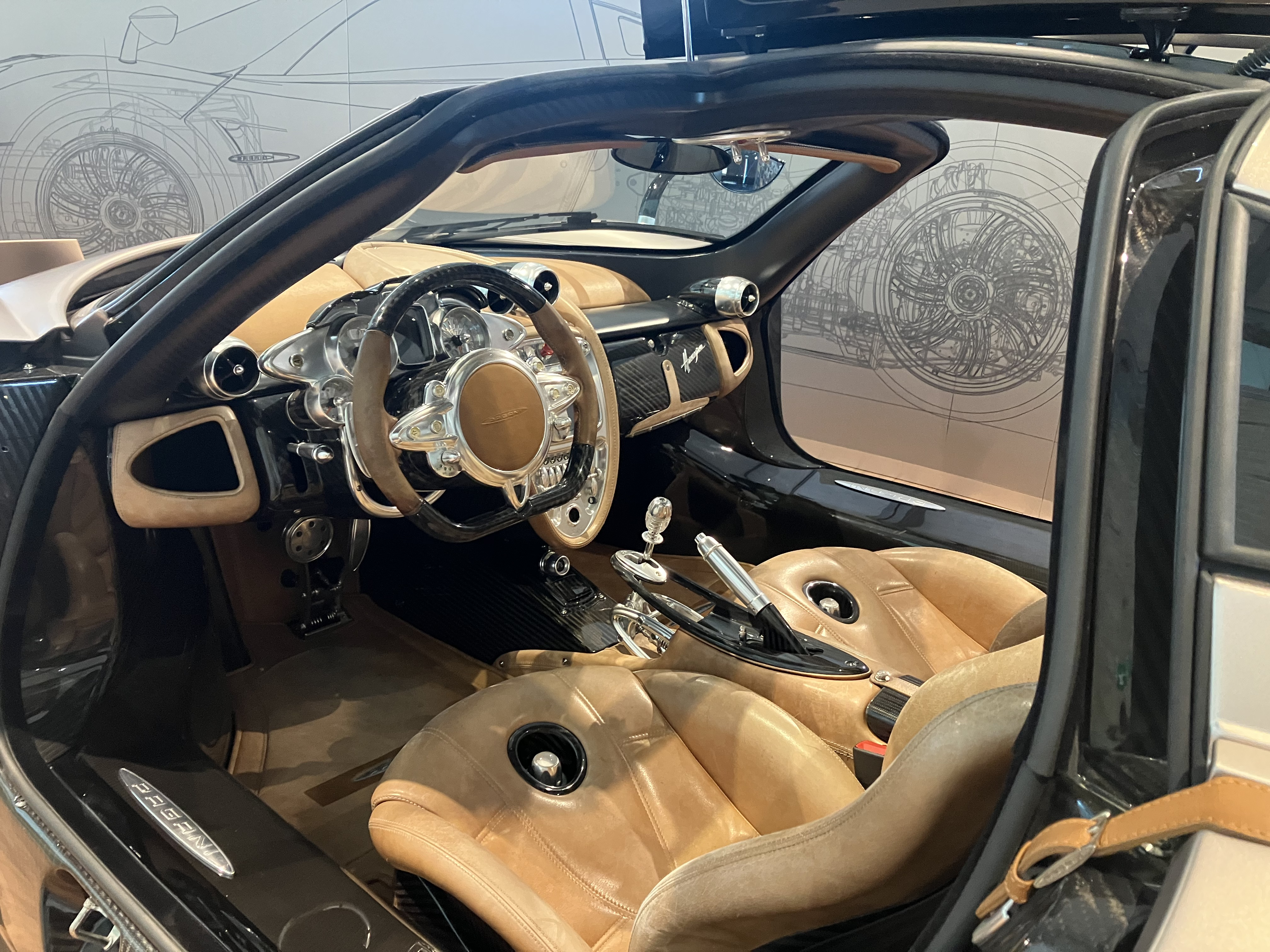
Huayra interior at the Pagani Museum

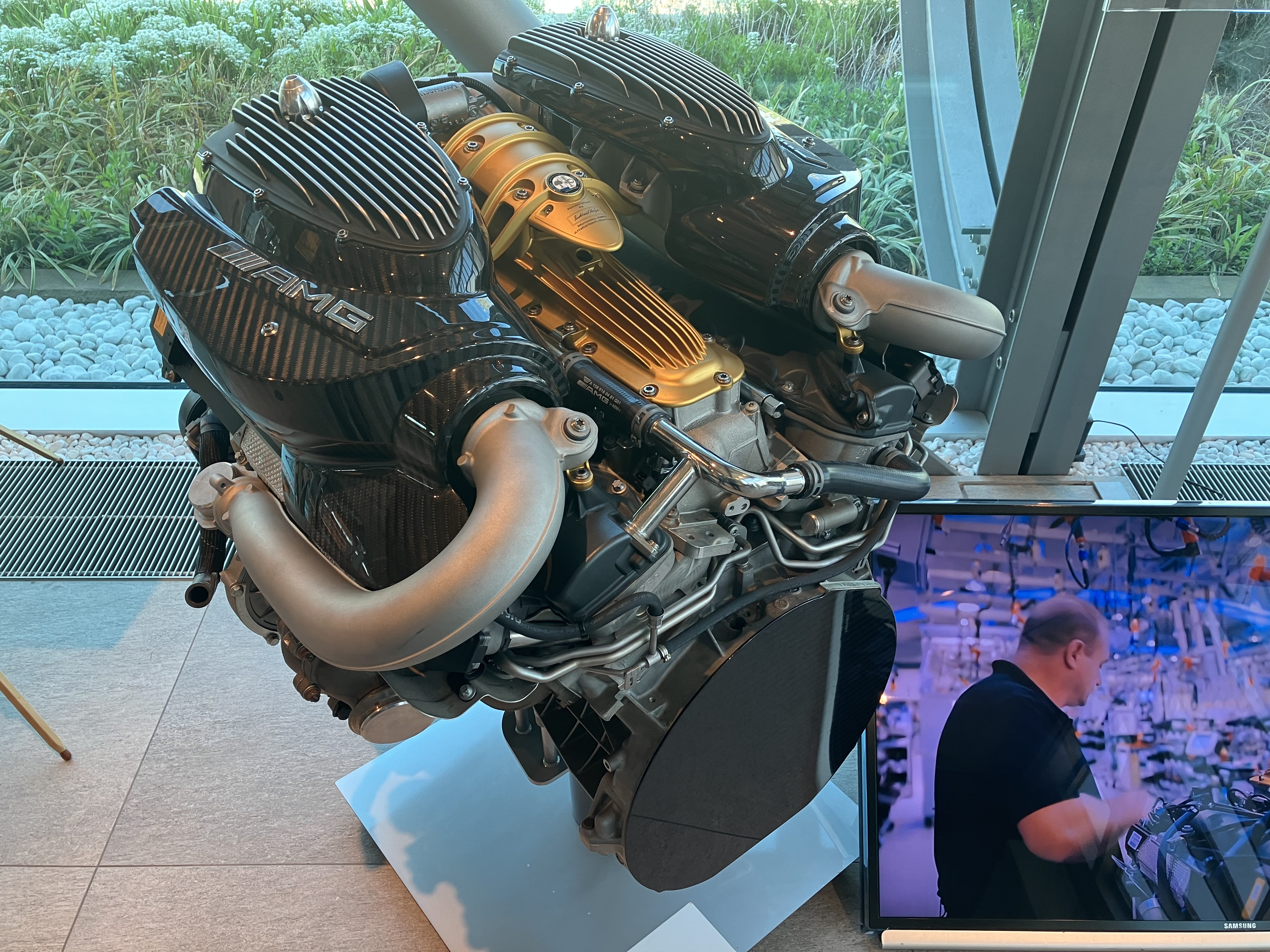
Mercedes-AMG M158 V12 (gearbox side)

The Huayra has a top speed of about 383 km/h (238 mph) and it has a 0-97 km/h (60 mph) acceleration time of 2.8 seconds. Using Pirelli tyres, the Pagani Huayra is capable of 1.66 g of lateral acceleration.

The Huayra uses a seven-speed sequential gearbox and a single disc clutch. The choice not to use a dual-clutch was due to the increase in weight of over 70 kg (154 lb), thus negating any advantage of the faster gear changes in a double-clutch transmission. As a result, the transmission weighs 96 kg (212 lb).

The car is equipped with Brembo brake calipers, rotors and pads. The calipers have six pistons at the front and four at the rear. The rotors are drilled carbon ceramic, 380 mm (15.0 in) in diameter and 34 mm (1.3 in) thick.

The Huayra uses a 6.0 L (5,980 cc) twin-turbocharged M158 60° V12 engine developed by Mercedes-AMG specially for the Huayra, which has a power output of 740 PS (544 kW; 730 hp) at 5,800 rpm and 1,000 N⋅m (738 lbf⋅ft) of torque at 2,250-4,500 rpm. The engine has been designed at the request of Pagani to reduce turbo lag and improve response, achieved with smaller turbochargers, a different intercooler configuration and re-programmed ECU settings.

Like many high-performance cars, the Huayra uses dry sump lubrication. This has several key benefits including guaranteeing oil flow even when the car is subjected to extreme lateral acceleration, preventing "oil surge" which allows the engine to operate more efficiently while the lack of an oil pan allows mounting the engine lower, lowering the car's center of gravity and improving handling. The fuel consumption of the Huayra is 10 mpg_{‑US} (23.5 L/100 km; 12.0 mpg_{‑imp}) in city and 14 mpg_{‑US} (16.8 L/100 km; 16.8 mpg_{‑imp}) in highway (EPA testing).

A water/oil heat exchanger reduces engine warm-up times on cold days and helps maintain a stable temperature for refrigerants and lubricants.

To minimise the use of pipes and fittings (and the overall weight of the vehicle), the coolant expansion tank is mounted directly on the engine. Intercooler fins act as an expansion tank circuit at low temperatures.

The titanium exhaust system was designed and built by MHG-Fahrzeugtechnik. Hydroformed joints were developed to reduce back pressure and ensure a free flow exhaust. Titanium reduces the weight of the exhaust system while the Inconel silencers improve reliability in the most exposed parts of the exhaust at high temperatures. The entire system weighs less than 10 kg (22 lb).

== Aerodynamics ==
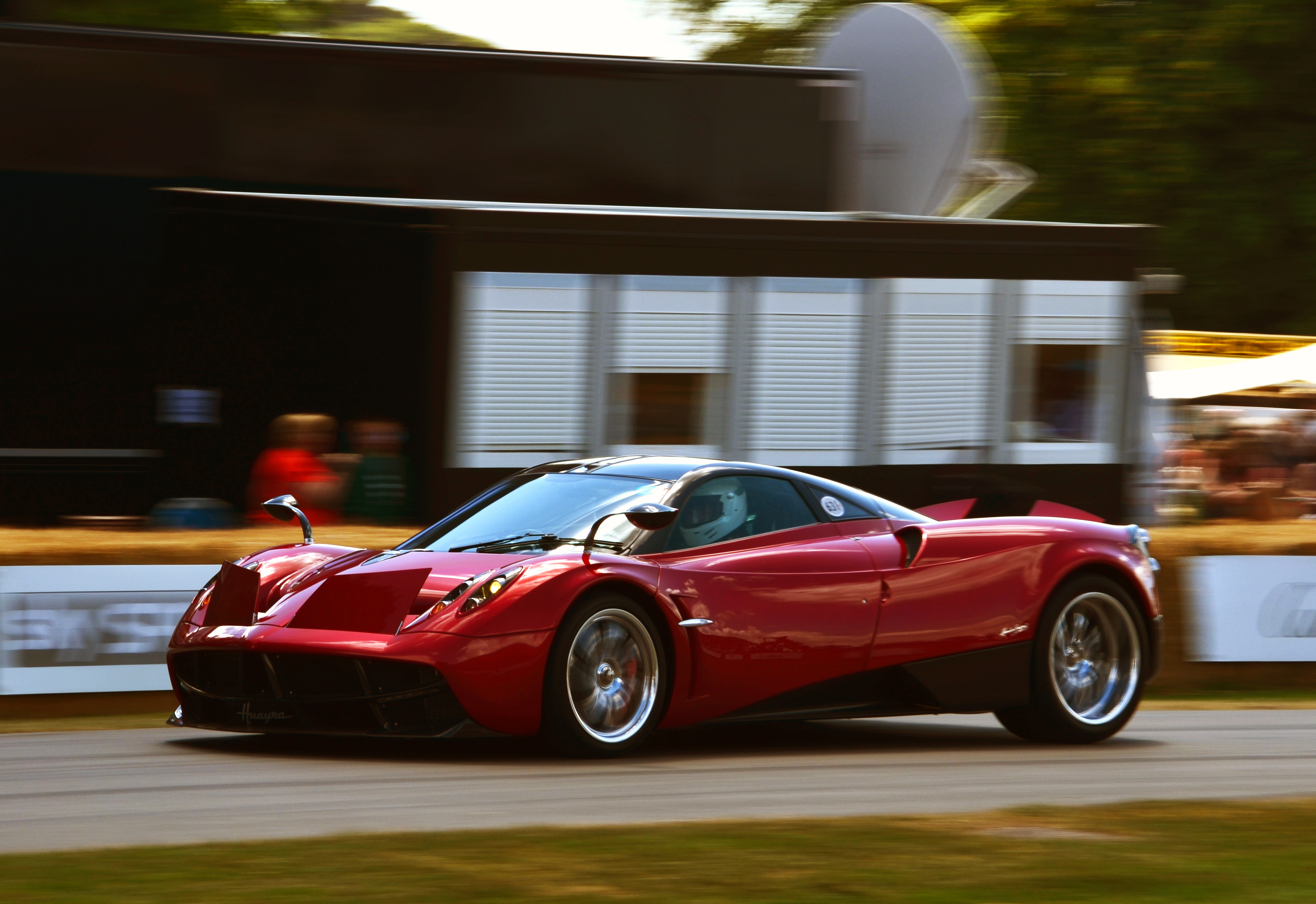
A Huayra's aerodynamic flaps in action

The Huayra is different from its predecessor in that it incorporates active aerodynamics. It is capable of changing the height of the front from the ground and independently operating four flaps placed at the rear and front of the car. The behavior of the flaps is managed by a dedicated control unit that is fed information from systems such as the ABS and ECU, which pass on information about the car's speed, yaw rate, lateral acceleration, steering angle and throttle position. This is intended to achieve minimal drag coefficient or maximum downforce depending on the situation. The Huayra's designer Horacio Pagani states that it has a variable drag coefficient of between .31 and .37. The system also prevents excess body roll in the corners by raising the "inside" flaps (i.e. the left ones in a left-handed corner and vice versa), increasing the downforce on that side of the car. The rear flaps also act as an airbrake. Under hard braking, both the front suspension and the two rear flaps are raised to counter-act weight transfer to the front wheels and keep the whole car stable, for instance when entering a corner. Air from the radiator is extracted through an arch in the bonnet at an angle that is designed not to affect the streamline around the body. The side air intakes behind the front wheels create a low pressure zone, resulting in downforce.

== Model variants ==
=== BC ===
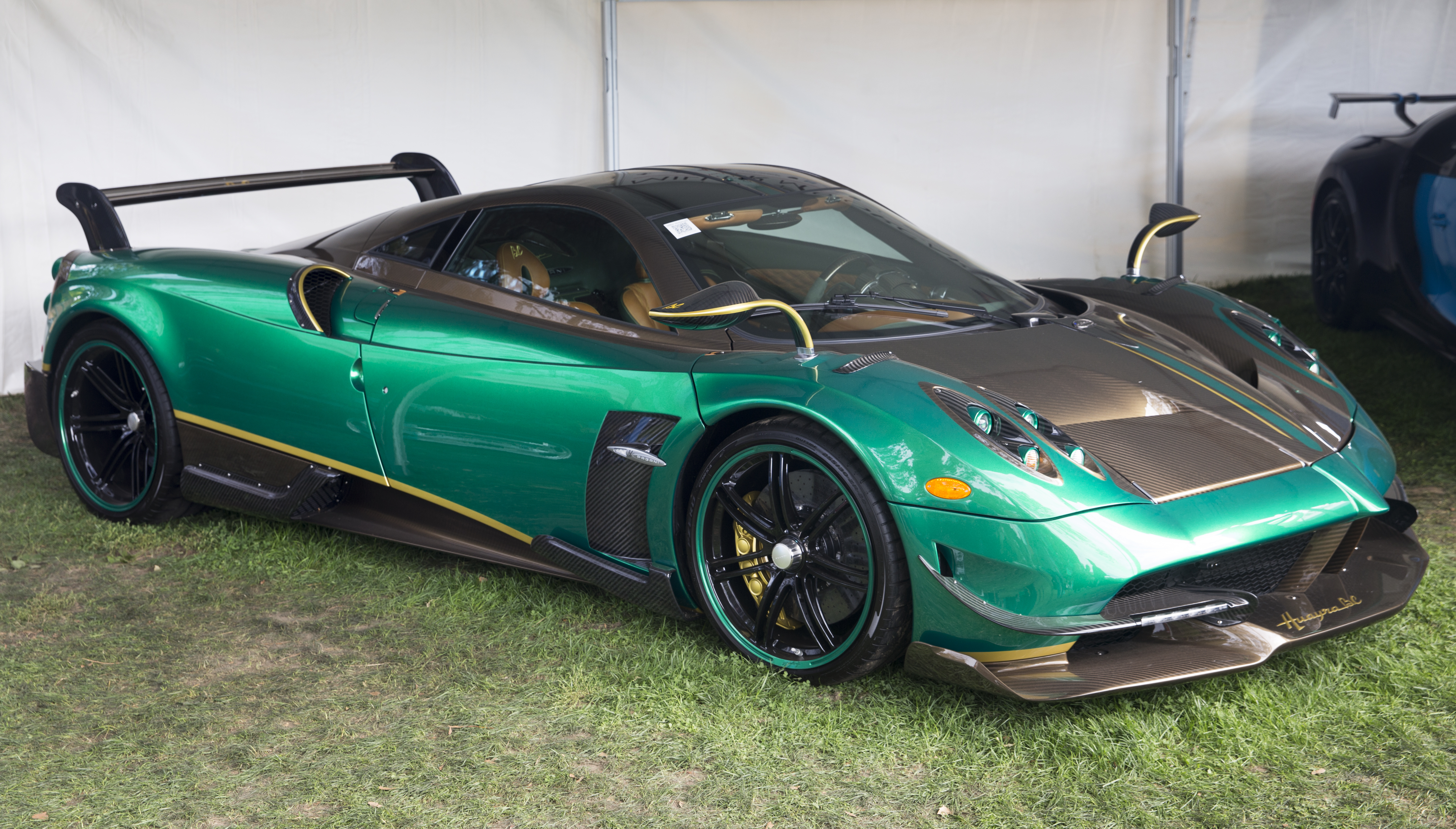
2017 Pagani Huayra BC

The Huayra BC is a track focused version of the Huayra which was unveiled at the 2016 Geneva Motor Show. The Huayra BC is named after the late Benny Caiola, a friend of Horacio Pagani, and the first customer for the brand entirely. This variant has an improved version of the standard 6.0 L twin-turbocharged V12 engine having a power output of 764 PS (562 kW; 754 hp) at 5900 rpm as well as 1,000 N⋅m (738 lbf⋅ft) of torque at 2500-5600 rpm. The dry weight is reduced by 132 kg (291 lb) to just 1,218 kg (2,685 lb), thanks to the use of a new material called 'carbon triax' which Pagani claims is 50% lighter and 20% stronger than regular carbon fibre, giving the car a power-to-weight ratio of 1.62 kg (3.57 lb) per horsepower. The Huayra BC comes with a lighter titanium exhaust system, new aluminum alloy wheels, and a stripped out interior. The Pirelli P-Zero Corsa tires used in this variant feature 12 different rubber compounds, and the suspension and wishbones are made of aeronautical grade aluminum, known as Avional. The Huayra BC also has a new front bumper with a front splitter and winglets, deeper side skirts, and an air diffuser that stretches the entire width of the rear bumper with a large rear wing. The car could be ordered with an optional roof scoop. All of the exterior components in the car are used to optimize downforce and drag. The Huayra BC uses an Xtrac 7-speed sequential manual transmission. Pagani has stuck with a single-clutch gearbox because it weighs 40% less than double-clutch gearboxes.

Pagani planned to make 20 units of the Huayra BC, which were all sold out. In reality, Pagani slightly overproduced the Huayra BC, producing 30 units instead of the promised 20, to the irritation of some owners.

=== Roadster ===
After 2 years of development, the Huayra Roadster was officially unveiled at the 2017 Geneva Motor Show.

The overall appearance of the car has changed, with the most obvious being the removable top (hence the Roadster name). This part of the vehicle is also its key element. The design of the rear is also different, with new eyelid-like fixed flaps that continue with the design and eventually end on the rear lights. The rear engine cover also has a new shape to adapt to the roadster form and now has vents for efficient cooling. The wheels are unique and specifically constructed for the car. The car has conventional doors instead of the Gull-wing doors of the coupé as they are impossible to fit on an open top car while maintaining the low weight.

The vehicle utilises the same twin-turbocharged M158 V12 engine as the coupé, but it now has a total power output of 764 PS (562 kW; 754 hp) at 6,200 rpm and 1,000 N⋅m (738 lbf⋅ft) of torque at 2,400 rpm. All of this power is delivered to the rear wheels via a 7-speed automated manual transmission by Xtrac. The car now uses a hydraulic and electronic activation system with carbon synchronizers. Bosch has also contributed in the construction of the car and the car uses their ECU system. The weight is now 70 kg (154 lb) lighter, for a total of 1,280 kg (2,820 lb), making it the first roadster lighter than the coupe version. Only 100 will be made, all of which have already been sold. The tyre supplier is Pirelli, with P-Zero tyres. The tyre have a white narrow outline, resembling those of an F1 race car. Pagani has also used a new material for the Roadster called carbon triax, which is a tri-axis fiberglass meshed with carbon-fibre power bands.

Pagani states that the car produces 816 kg (1,800 lb) of downforce or 1.8 lateral G-force. This figure is unproven, but if true, Pagani will have set a new record.

=== Roadster BC ===
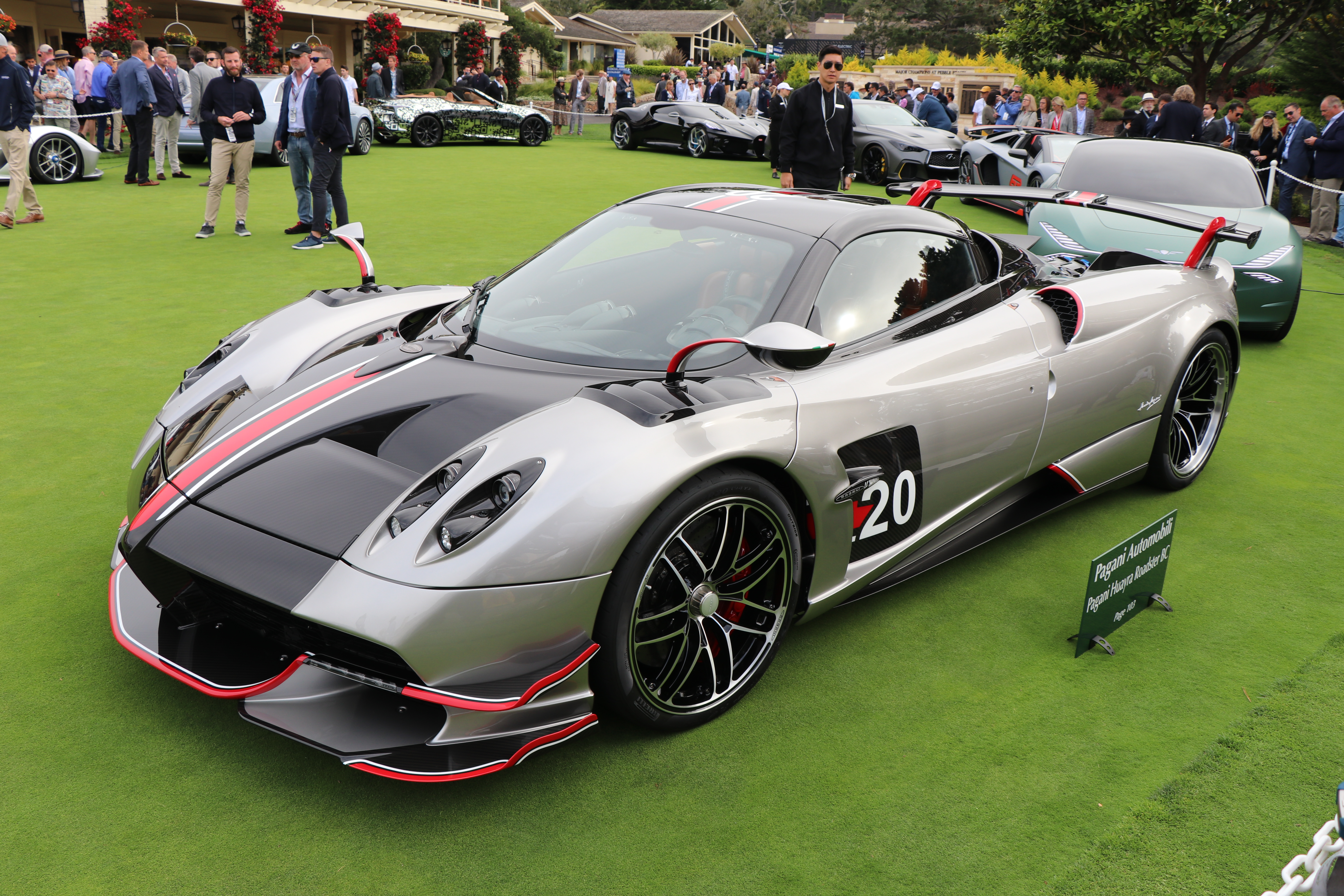
Huayra Roadster BC

Introduced in July 2019, the Huayra Roadster BC is the track-oriented version of the Roadster. It shares few aerodynamic parts as present on the BC and has a modified version of the 6.0-litre twin-turbocharged V12 engine rated at 802 PS (590 kW; 791 hp) and 1,050 N⋅m (774.5 lb⋅ft) of torque. The 7-speed Xtrac sequential gearbox with single clutch used on the roadster is 35% lighter than a contemporary dual-clutch gearbox. The Huayra Roadster BC sits at 1,250 kg (2,756 lb) which is slightly heavier than the coupe, with a dry weight of 1,218 kg (2,685 lb). It is 30 kg (66 lb) lighter than the normal Roadster 1,280 kg (2,822 lb). The monocoque of the Roadster BC is constructed of carbon-titanium HP62 material to keep weight low and make the construction rigid. The Roadster BC is claimed to generate 500 kg (1,102 lb) of downforce at 280 km/h (174 mph) due to its large fixed rear wing and aerodynamic elements. In addition to movable active Aero elements, the titanium exhaust incorporates flaps in the catalytic converters to divert exhaust gases over the underfloor elements like a Formula 1 car's blown diffuser. Production of the Huayra Roadster BC will be limited to 40 units only. It is often erroneously known as the 'BC Roadster'.

=== Imola ===
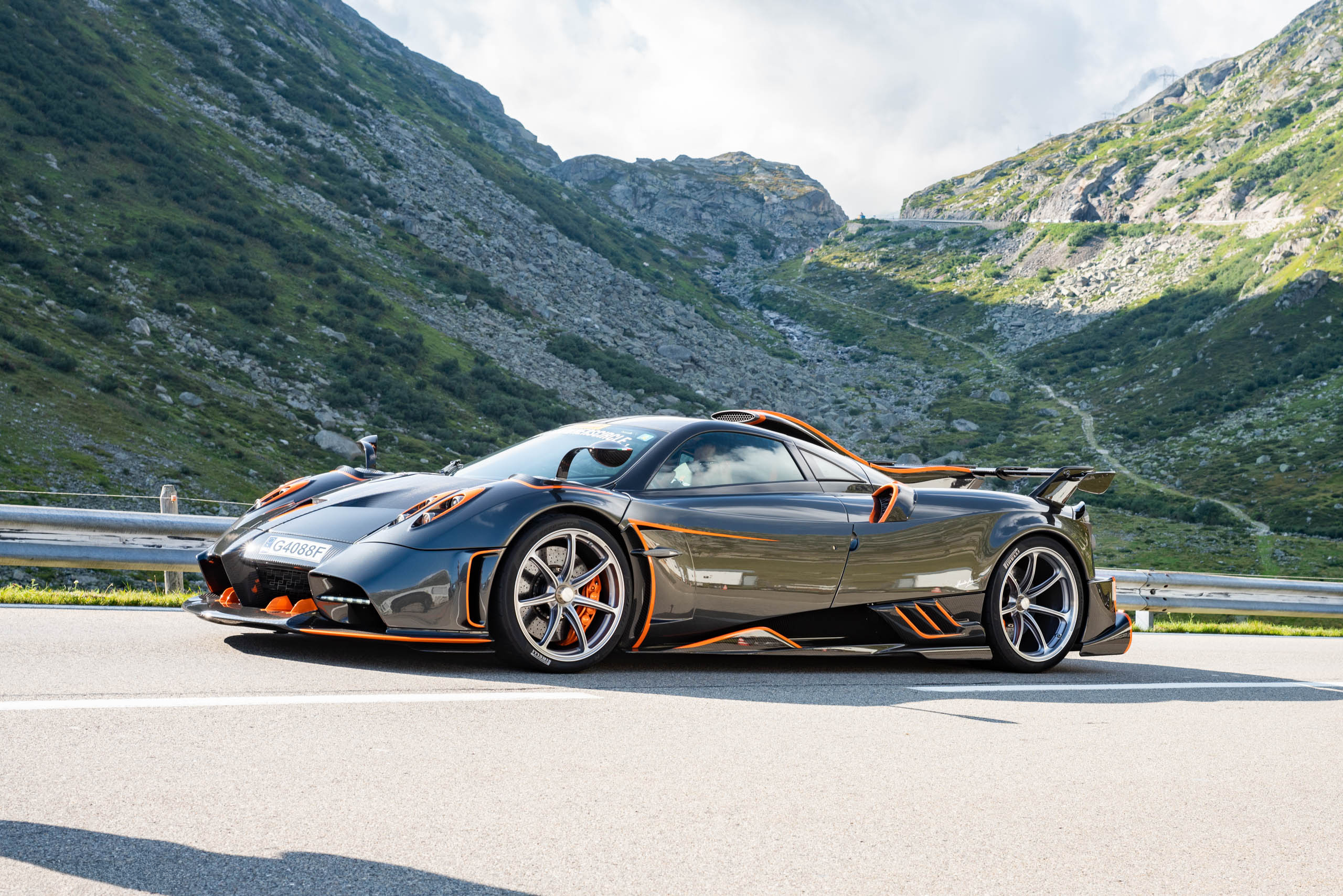
The Pagani Imola

Introduced in February 2020, the Imola is named after the Autodromo Internazionale Enzo e Dino Ferrari (Imola Circuit), where it underwent 16,000 km of high-speed testing. It is the most powerful street-legal Pagani at the time, using the Mercedes-AMG V12 tuned to 838 PS (827 hp; 616 kW) and 1,100 N⋅m (811 lb⋅ft). Weight saving measures such as a new carbon fibre blend and lightweight paint application have reduced the Imola's dry weight to 1,246 kg (2,747 lb). Exterior changes from the standard Huayra include a large seven-section diffuser, a large roof scoop, a shark fin, more pronounced side skirts and a wide fixed rear wing with an integrated stoplight. Six Imola were built: 5 for customers and 1 prototype for Horacio Pagani.

=== Tricolore ===
On 16 December 2020, Pagani introduced the Huayra Tricolore, was built to celebrate the 60th Anniversary of Frecce Tricolori, Italy's aerobatic team.

The Tricolore uses a twin-turbo 6.0-liter V12 engine sourced from Mercedes-AMG which has been tuned to produce 829 horsepower and 811 pound-feet of torque, which is 38 bhp and 37 lb ft more than the power and torque produced by a standard Huayra BC engine. The car is only available in roadster form and shares much of the bodywork of the Roadster BC. It is unpainted except for a clear blue lacquer, and red, white, and green stripes from the nose along the top of the car's surface. Inside, the Tricolore is equipped with white and blue leather seats with Italian flag stripes, and the Tricolori logo is embroidered into the headrests. The Pitot tube mounted on the nose of the car, a metal measuring device that's typically uses on planes to measure air speed, is a unique feature of the Tricolore.

The production is limited to three customer units as its predecessor and priced at €5,500,000+taxes ($6.7 million+taxes) each. In reality, there will be four Huayra Tricolore: 3 customer cars and 1 prototype owned by the company. The first two customer cars have been delivered, as of early 2022. One car went to a customer in Stuttgart, Germany, while another went to a customer in Wisconsin, USA (but delivered through Pagani of Dallas).

=== R ===
In March 2021, Pagani introduced the Huayra R, a track-only version of the Huayra and the successor of the Pagani Zonda R. The Huayra R uses the "Pagani V12-R" a 6.0 L naturally aspirated V12 engine built from the ground up by HWA AG to produce 850 PS (625 kW; 838 hp) at 8,250 rpm as well as 750 N⋅m (553 lbf⋅ft) of torque at 5,500 rpm to 8300 rpm, and a redline at 9,000 rpm. The Huayra R has a 6-speed sequential transmission newly developed for the car, and various weight saving measures have resulted in a lower dry weight of 1,050 kg (2,315 lb).

Pagani plans a limited 30-car production run for the Huayra R, similar to the limited 15-car production run of the track-only version of the Pagani Zonda, the Zonda R. It will cost €2.6 million (around $3.1 million), plus applicable taxes.

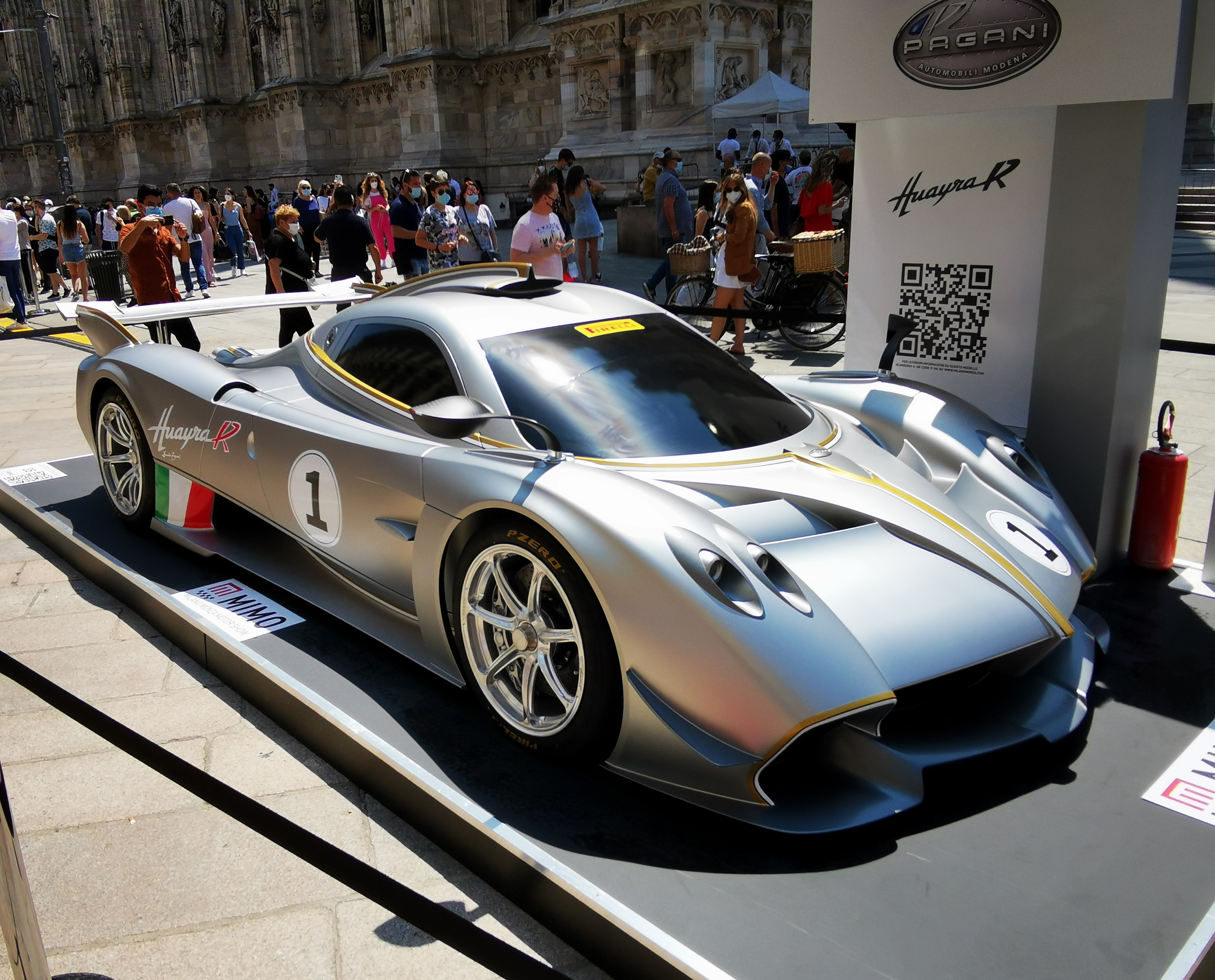
Pagani Huayra R at Milano Monza Motor Show 2021

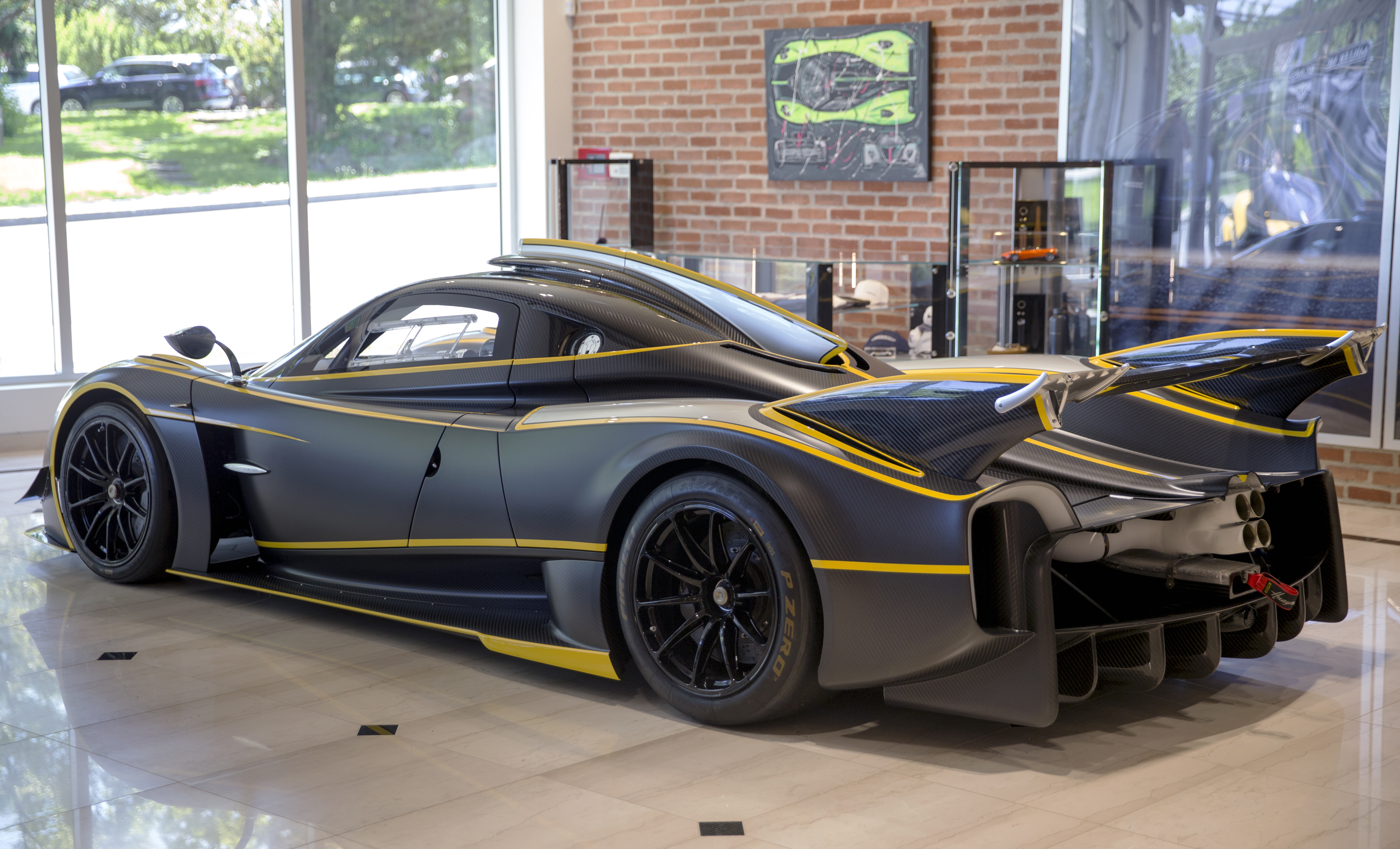
Rear view (car no. 23)

=== Codalunga ===
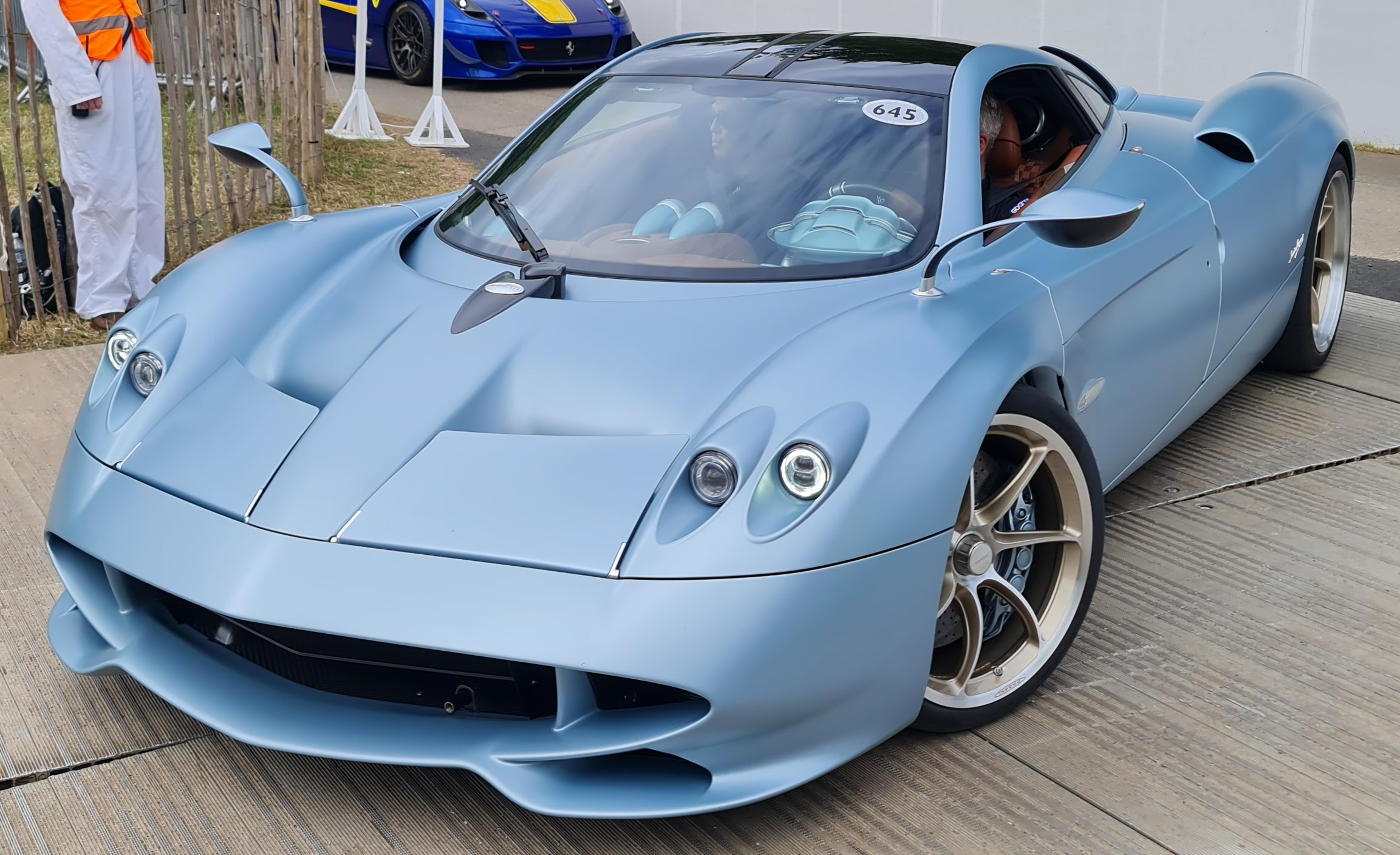
Huayra Codalunga at the 2022 Goodwood Festival of Speed

On 16 June 2022, Pagani introduced the Huayra Codalunga, a 5 units limited version of the Huayra, to pay homage to the lines of racecars from the 1960s, like the Porsche 917 (Horacio's favorite car). Prices started at €7mln+tax (around $7.36mln+tax) with all 5 units being sold before its unveiling. This car was the result of a special project by Pagani Grandi Complicazioni.

=== Imola Roadster ===
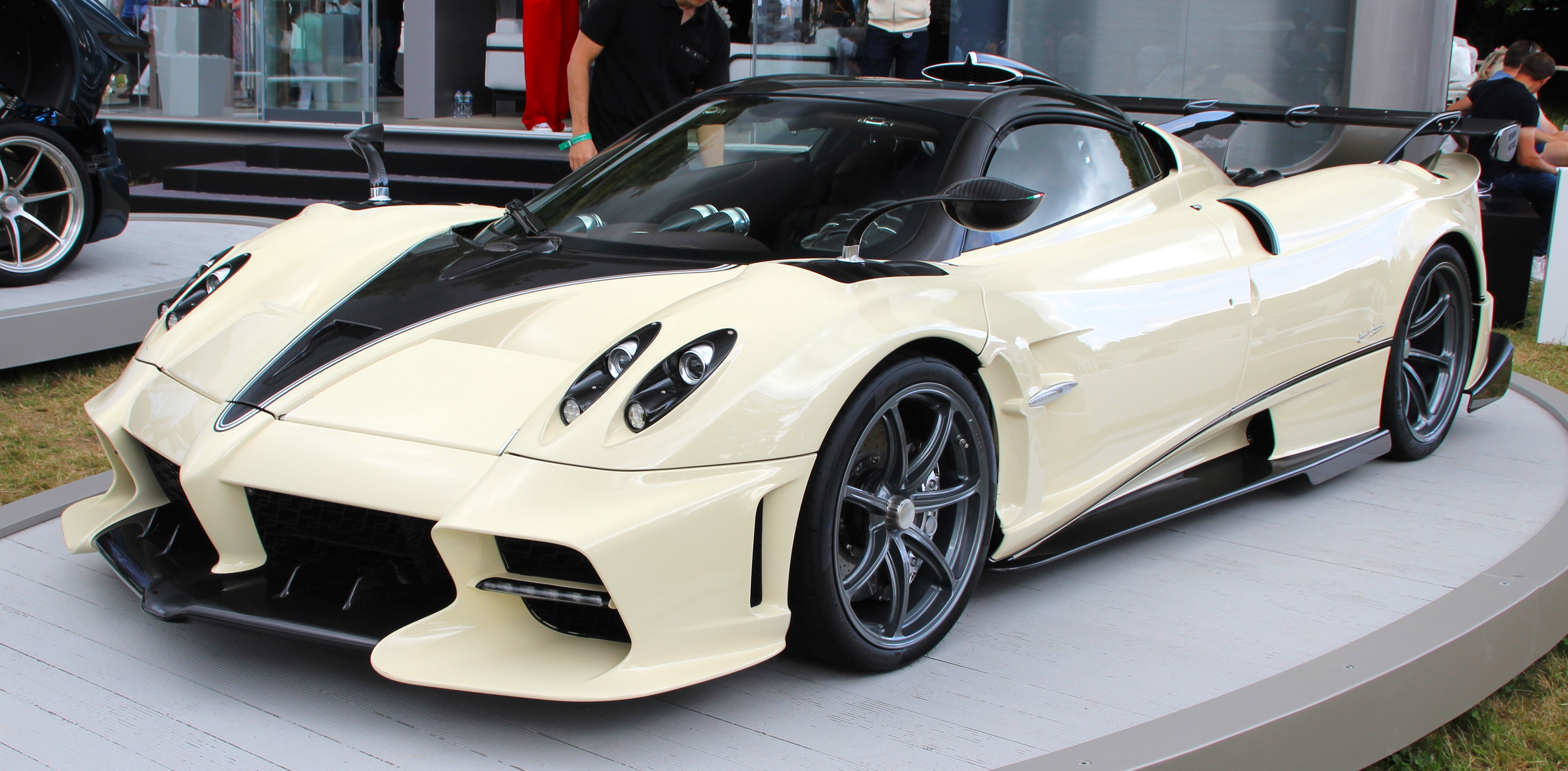
Imola Roadster at the 2024 Goodwood Festival of Speed

On 23 November 2023, Pagani introduced the Imola Roadster, the convertible version of the Pagani Imola but inspired by the Huayra R.

The Imola Roadster uses the same Mercedes-AMG V12, 6.0-liter twin-turbo engine to produce 850 PS (625 kW; 838 hp) at 5,600 rpm as well as 1,100 N⋅m (553 lbf⋅ft) of torque from 3,600 to 5,600 rpm.

Production of the Imola Roadster will be limited to 8 units only.

=== R Evo Roadster ===
In February 2024, Pagani univeiled the Huayra R Evo Roadster. It is at the same time a longtail and an open top variant of the Huayra R. This version preserves the naturally aspirated V12 already used on the R.

=== Codalunga Speedster ===
On 8 July 2025, Pagani introduced the Huayra Codalunga Speedster, the open top variant of the Huayra Codalunga. Unlike the coupé version, production of this model will be limited to 10 units only.

== Special editions ==
=== Lampo ===
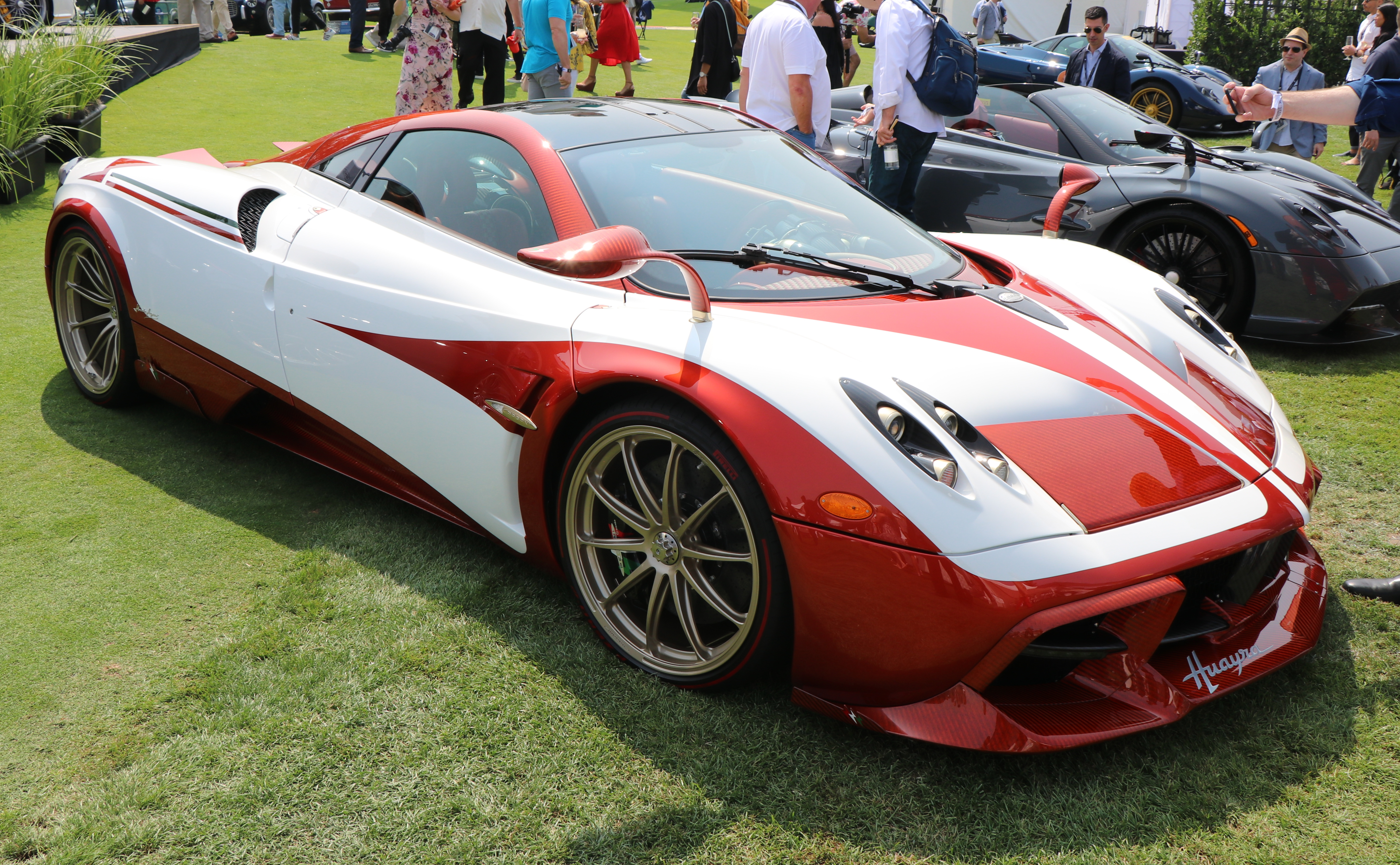
Huayra Lampo

In December 2017, Pagani introduced the Huayra Lampo (Italian for "lightning") in partnership with Lapo Elkann of Garage Italia Customs. This one-off was inspired by the Fiat Turbina concept revealed in 1954. This particular Huayra also received the "Tempesta" pack: larger front openings, plus new aero elements on the front splitter and sills.

=== Epitome ===
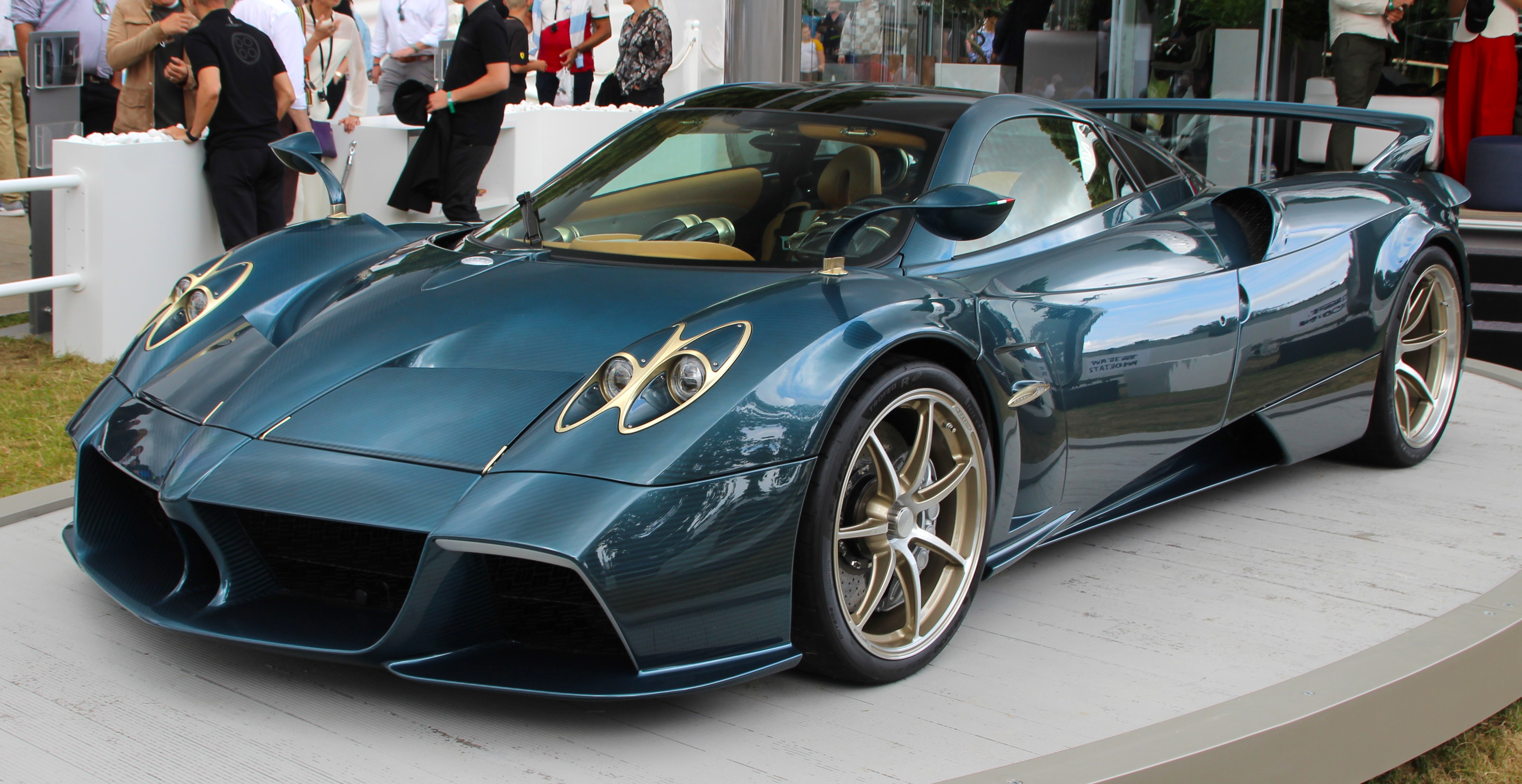
Huayra Epitome at the 2024 Goodwood Festival of Speed

In July 2024, Pagani introduced a one-off version of the Huayra called the Huayra Epitome, which was developed by Pagani Grandi Complicazioni. It is powered by a twin-turbocharged 6.0-liter V-12 engine sourced from Mercedes-AMG that develops 852 horsepower and 811 pound-feet of torque, and revs to 6,700 rpm mated to a seven-speed manual transmission.

=== Executor ===
In March 2025, a one-off $6.9 million manual version of Pagani Huayra Roadster Executor was delivered in California to Vince Zampella, the creator of Call of Duty video game series. The specification is inspired by Darth Vader's signature flagship, the Executor, from The Empire Strikes Back.

== See also ==
- List of production cars by power output

== Media ==
- A red and black Huayra appears in the 2014 film Transformers: Age of Extinction as a vehicle mode for a KSI-built Decepticon named Stinger.
- EA secured the exclusive video game rights to the Pagani Huayra in 2011, available exclusively in Need for Speed titles in 2011, Shift 2: Unleashed and Need for Speed: The Run. This license expired on 31 December 2011. After this it was featured in a number of video games from other studios.
