= Wayra Tata =

Quechua and Aymara wind god

Wayra Tata ("Father of Wind"), also transliterated as Huayra-tata, was a god worshipped by the Puruhá Quechuas and Aymaras of the Bolivian and Peruvian Andes prior to European colonization.

The god was represented as a human figure with two heads and serpents coiled around him from head to foot. He was associated with hurricane winds and fertilizing rains, and was believed to manifest in the form of wind, especially whirlwind.

The 1968 Huayra Pronello Ford and the 2011 Pagani Huayra sports cars were named after the god.
