= Development of electronics for GM auto racing =

Electronics for GM auto racing

In 1986, the GM Motorsports group asked Delco Electronics Corporation (December), a subsidiary of GM Hughes Electronics (headquarters- Kokomo, Indiana) if an electronic engine management system could be developed for the Chevy Indy V8 engines used in the CART open-wheel race series. Delco Electronics had been supplying all GM automobiles sold in the US with Engine Control Modules (ECMs) since 1981 when the US Clean Air Act required 3-way catalytic converters and controlled air-fuel ratios. The production ECMs were becoming more complex, and were becoming powertrain controllers controlling the transmission, spark timing, Idle speed, as well as air-fuel intake mixtures.

Delco Electronics hired a small group of electronic designers and technicians at their facility in Goleta, California (near Santa Barbara, California) to undertake special assignable projects that were advanced or more state of the art. This facility was called Delco Systems Operations (formerly known as GM Defense Research Labs), a part of Delco Electronics Corporation at the time. Delco Systems Operations is the place where the Apollo Program's Lunar Rover Mobility Sub-system was developed and built, also the Apollo Program's guidance computers (Apollo PGNCS) and the Boeing 747 guidance computers (Delco Carousel IV) were developed and manufactured there. All Delco Electronics Motorsports products developed before 1994 were designed by this group. From 1994 onwards, they have been developed at Delco Electronics/Delphi in Kokomo, IN.

The first generation of engine management controller for CART racing used a modified production ECM, but performed poorly in the race car due to the harsh EMI (Electromagnetic Interference) environment. This version was never used in racing, but the experience gained enabled the engineers to design a more successful Generation 2 controller for use in the 1988 CART IndyCar World series.

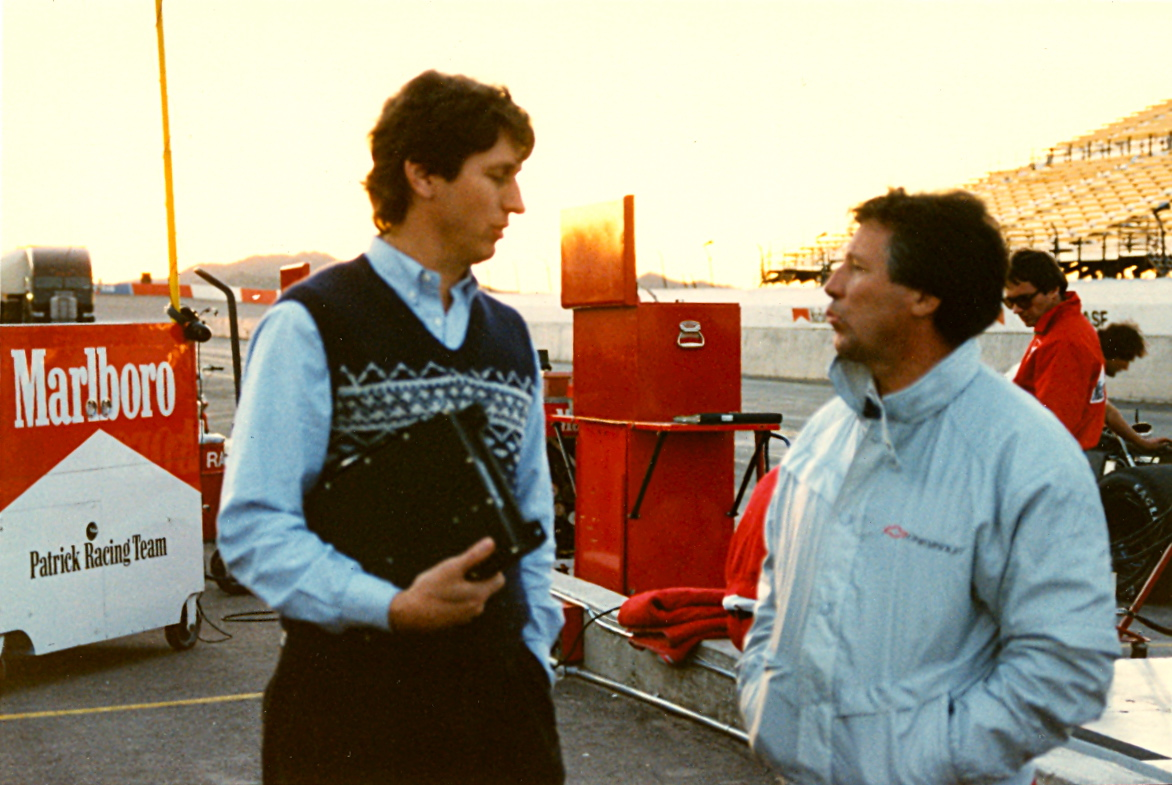
Practice at Phoenix 1988. Mario Illien introduces the Gen II to Mario Andretti

Generation 2 controllers were used experimentally by Newman/Haas Racing in 1988 and the first win was in the Cleveland GP with Mario Andretti driving.

In 1989 Newman/Haas Racing, Team Penske, Galles Racing, and Patrick Racing teams used Delco Electronics Gen-2 controllers with the Ilmor Chevy Indy V8 engine. "By the start of the 1989 season, racing pundits recognized that Chevrolet, with its Ilmor Engineering engines and Delco Electronics equipment, had assembled perhaps the most potent racing power in the history of the sport. As the season got under way in April, the pattern of winning began. Racing's elite drivers- Al Unser Jr. and Senior, Emerson Fittipaldi, Rick Mears, Danny Sullivan, and Mario and Michael Andretti—were driving the best equipment in the world.

The results began to show early on. By October, Chevy engines with DE equipment had won 13 of the 15 IndyCar races.

When Emerson Fittipaldi won the 1989 Indianapolis 500 in a Chevrolet Indy V8 engine controlled by a Delco Electronics electronic engine control module (ECM), it was the first time in the 500's history that the engine of the winning vehicle was controlled by an electronic engine management system.

For the 1990 season, all teams using the Ilmor Chevy Indy V8 were provided a redesigned Gen-3 system and it won 15 poles, 16 wins including the 1990 Indianapolis 500, with 17 races in the IndyCar World Series. To prove the system, the components were used with GM engines in the Trans-Am Racing series during 1989.

In the 1991 IndyCar World Series, Gen-3 had a perfect score: 17 poles, 17 wins, 17 races including the 1991 Indianapolis 500. At the 1991 Indianapolis 500, Delco Electronics introduced telemetry to the electronic system using the advanced spread spectrum radio technology. It was so popular that all IndyCar teams eventually used it, and many still use it. ABC TV used the data from the systems to display real time data with ABC's in-car video cameras.

In 1990 and 1991, the Chevy engine with the Delco Electronics Gen-3 controller won 33 straight IndyCar races. Chevy's dominance had proved that electronics had found their place in IndyCar racing.

In the 1992 IndyCar World Series, race cars with Gen-3 captured 7 poles, 11 wins including the 1992 Indianapolis 500, in 16 races.

For the 1993 IndyCar World Series, Delco Electronics had been developing a smaller more powerful controller using 32-bit computers and a high-level software language called Modula-GM. This system was called Gen-4 and won much praise for its improved functions and features. The telemetry system developed for the 1992 season was used, and a new Distributor-less Ignition module component was added to the overall engine management system. 10 wins including the 1993 Indianapolis 500 in 16 CART races.

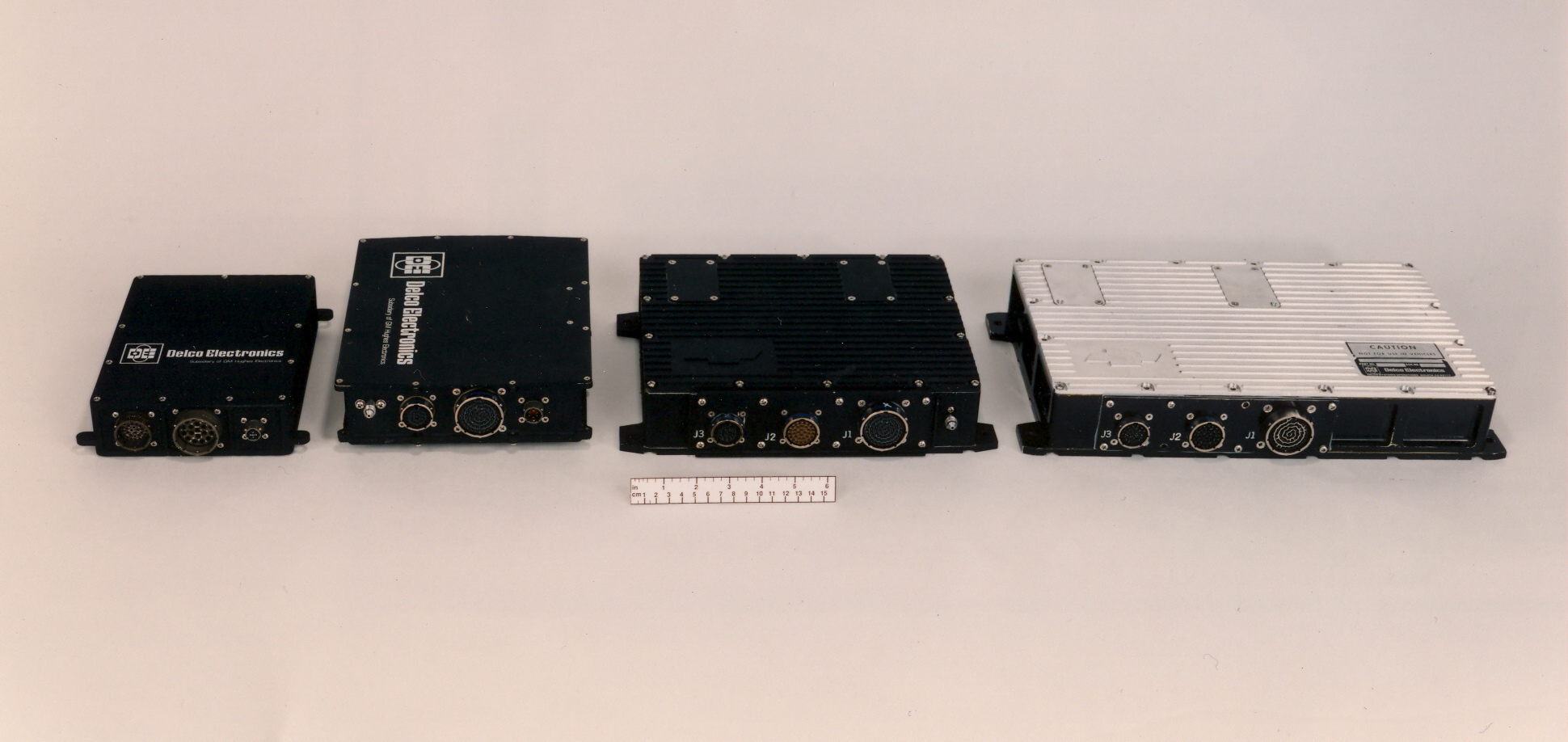
Left to Right Gen-4, Gen-3, Gen-2, & Gen-1 Delco Electronics Motorsport Engine Control Modules

In 1994, a totally new Ilmor engine was introduced to IndyCar teams and the engine controller was Delco Electronics Gen-4: 12 wins including the 1994 Indianapolis 500, 16 races.

In 1995, Gen-4 won 6 races out of 17.

In 1996, the Indy Racing League split from CART and used the naturally aspirated Oldsmobile Aurora engine, which used the Delco Electronics Gen-4 system until the engine was retired from the IRL IndyCar Series a few years ago. 1997 was the last year the Gen-4 ran in the CART IndyCar World Series.

Per a February 27, 2003 Delphi Press Release, Delphi's current involvement in open wheel racing is as follows:

"Delphi is the official electronics provider to the IRL and has been involved in open-wheel racing since 1988. Today, a majority of the vehicles in the IRL are equipped with several of Delphi's racing products including:

- Delphi Earpiece Sensor System – measures dynamic forces to a driver's head during an accident. It uses small sensors integrated into the left and right radio earpieces worn by the driver. The six accelerometers—one for each of the three axes on each side—measure acceleration in the X, Y and Z axes during an accident. The combined data from the earpiece sensor system and onboard accident data recorder provide accident researchers valuable data for a clearer picture of what happens during a crash.
- Accident Data Recorder (ADR2) – senses and records key vehicle parameters at 1,000 samples per second just prior to, during, and after an accident-triggering event.
- Track Condition Radio – helps alert drivers with critical information by transmitting messages from race control to the racecar. A dash-mounted display communicates messages including safety warnings, track condition and pits open/closed.
- Radio Telemetry Module – transmits engine and chassis data from a speeding racecar to race team engineers located in the pits. The telemetry module helps enhance driver safety and race team strategy by making real-time data available.
- Multec(R) Bottom Feed Methanol Electronic Fuel Injector – provides a high flow rate and a low-profile package that are ideal for port fuel racing applications. The injector is able to operate at high temperatures and provide a high level of spray atomization.
- Connectors, Cables and Terminals – connectors are coupling devices that provide an electrical and mechanical connection/disconnection in a system. Cables are insulated electrical conductors. Terminals are devices attached to the end of a wire to facilitate electrical connections. All of these Delphi components enable a vehicle's electrical/electronic system to function under tough conditions in racing.

Delphi also has begun offering services to the racing industry, including Hydraulic Sled Testing from its state-of-the-art testing laboratory in Vandalia, Ohio. Delphi provides comprehensive safety testing using a hydraulic test sled to simulate a crash. Services include on-board data acquisition, on- and off-board digital video monitoring and the use of Delphi safety products such as the earpiece sensor system and accident data recorder."

Awards for this program:

Louis Schwitzer Awards for Engineering Excellence (since 1967):

- 1994: Mario Illien, Mercedes 209 CID Engine with Delco Electronics Gen-4 controller (Also won in 1986 for Ilmor-Chevrolet Engine that used Gen-2, 3, & 4 controllers 1988 to 1996)
- 1996: Dave Schnelker, Ning wu, I-Fu Shih of Delco Electronics & Ed Rothrock of Bell Sports (Design of Racing EyeCue)
- 1997: Ed Keating and Roger Allen of GM Motorsports (Oldsmobile Aurora Engine with Delco Electronics Gen-4 controller)
- 2005: Delphi engineers Erskine Carter, Glen Gray, Andy Inman, Tim Kronenberg and Bruce Natvig (Delphi Earpiece Sensor System)
- 2007: Delphi engineers Erskine Carter, Glen Gray, Andy Inman, Tim Kronenberg and Bruce Natvig (Delphi Accident Data Recorder 3 – ADR 3))
