= Delco Electronics =

American auto parts supplier

Delco Electronics Corporation
- Formerly: Dayton Engineering Laboratories Co.
- Company type: Subsidiary
- Industry: Automotive
- Founded: 1909; 117 years ago, in Dayton, Ohio
- Founders: Charles Kettering; Edward A. Deeds
- Defunct: 1985; 41 years ago
- Fate: Merged by GM with Hughes Aircraft to form Hughes Electronics
- Successor: Hughes Electronics
- Headquarters: U.S.
- Products: Automobile radios
- Parent: General Motors
- Subsidiaries: Dayton-Wright Company

Delco Electronics Corporation was the automotive electronics design and manufacturing subsidiary of General Motors based in Kokomo, Indiana, that manufactured Delco Automobile radios and other electric products found in GM cars. In 1972, General Motors merged it with the AC Electronics division and it continued to operate as part of the Delco Electronics division of General Motors. When the corporation acquired the Hughes Aircraft Company, Delco was merged with it to form Hughes Electronics as an independent subsidiary.

The name "Delco" came from the "Dayton Engineering Laboratories Co.", founded in Dayton, Ohio, by Charles Kettering and Edward A. Deeds in 1909. Delco was responsible for several innovations in automobile electric systems, including the first reliable battery ignition system and the first practical automobile self-starter.

== History ==
Initially Kettering and Deeds were co-workers at National Cash Register Company (NCR). Kettering and Deeds had a lifelong professional relationship and friendship. In 1904, Deeds hired Kettering at NCR to develop a cash register that operated with an electric motor.

=== Delco ignition system ===
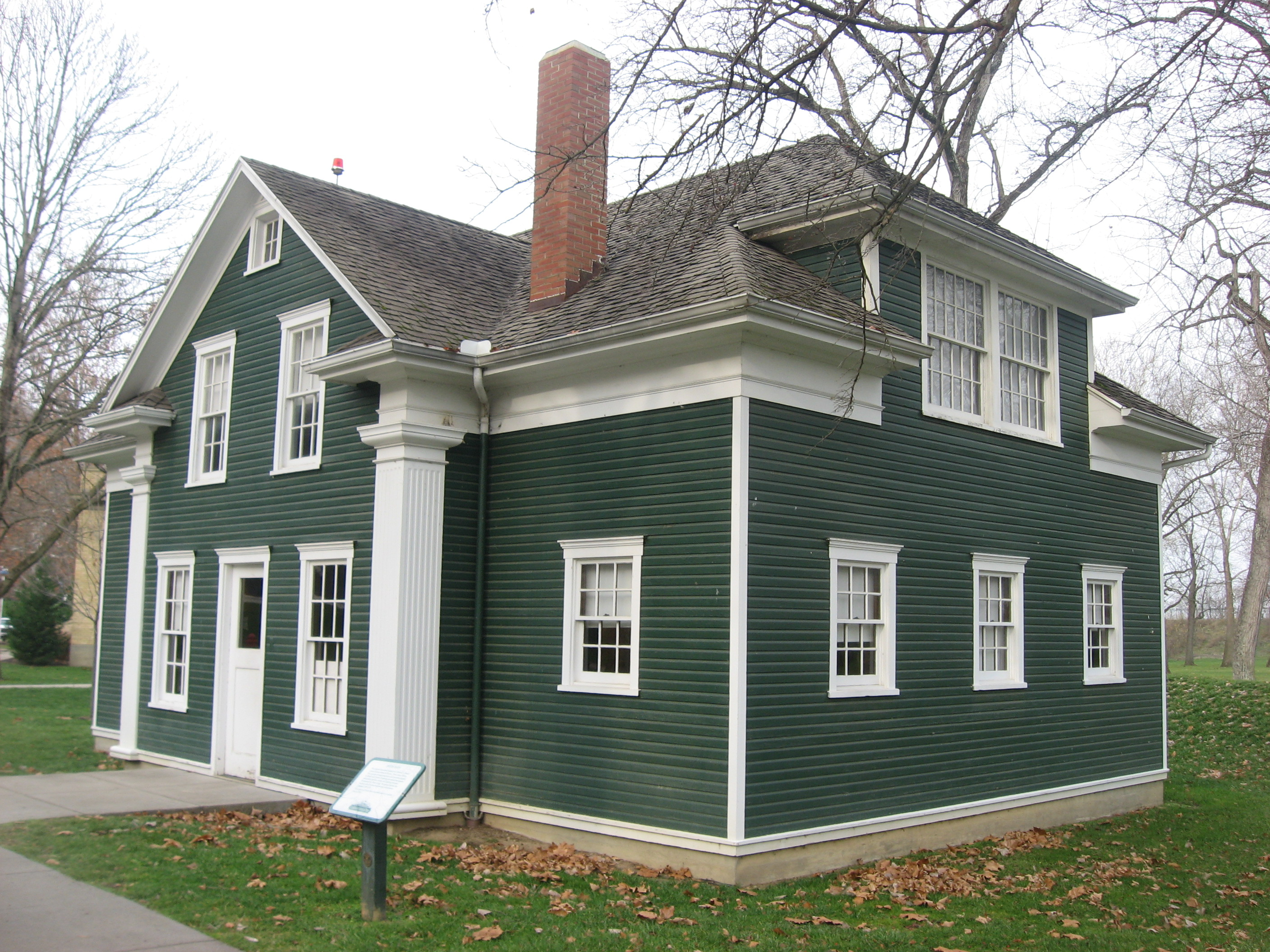
Deeds' barn

Around 1908, Deeds asked for help with a car he was building from a kit. Working in one of Deeds' barns with spare-time help from William A. Chryst and other NCR friends, Kettering developed a high-energy spark ignition system to replace the weak-spark model supplied with the kit. Leaving NCR in 1909, Kettering focused on final development of this ignition set and demonstrations were favorably received. In 1909, when Henry Leland of Cadillac ordered 5,000 ignition sets, Deeds and Kettering formed the Dayton Engineering Laboratories company. The ignition system was introduced on the 1910 Cadillac.

=== Electric starter ===
In 1911, Kettering invented and filed for U.S. patent 1,150,523 for the first useful electric starter, adapted from a cash register motor. The starters were first installed by Cadillac on production models in 1912.

=== Delco products ===
1919 Delco-Light newspaper ad, with the generator and the storage batteries along the bottom

In 1915, Deeds left NCR to devote himself full-time to Delco. At the time, one of Kettering's widely known inventions was the Delco-Light, a small internal combustion generator with battery intended to provide a source of electric illumination and mechanical power to rural residents (mostly farmers) who were yet to be connected to the nascent electrical grid system. The "Delco" brand name was associated with original production units of the company such as 'Delco Light', 'Delco Products', 'Delco Moraine' and others.

=== World War I ===
During World War I, the Delco plant in Moraine, Ohio, was expanded to manufacture the Airco DH.4 bomber, the only American-built airplane to see action in World War I. More than 3,000 were built in Moraine for the Dayton-Wright Airplane Company. Delco was also one of the manufacturers that produced the Liberty aircraft engine.

=== Acquisition by GM ===
In 1918, General Motors (GM) bought the United Motors Company which had been formed several years earlier by William C Durant to house several prominent parts manufacturers, including Delco, Dayton-Wright, and the Dayton Metal Products Company. All of these latter companies were associated with Charles Kettering, Edward A. Deeds, and Harold Talbott, father of Harold E. Talbott. Kettering became vice president of General Motors Research Corporation in 1920. He held the position as head of research for GM for 27 years.

=== Cold carburetion system ===
In 1930, Delco Products researched and developed a new type of auto carburetion system called the Cold Carburetion System which was a cross of the standard carburetor of that era and the future fuel injection system. While Delco Products promised a lot with their invention, it never became an option on GM autos either as production or an addon.

=== Car radios ===
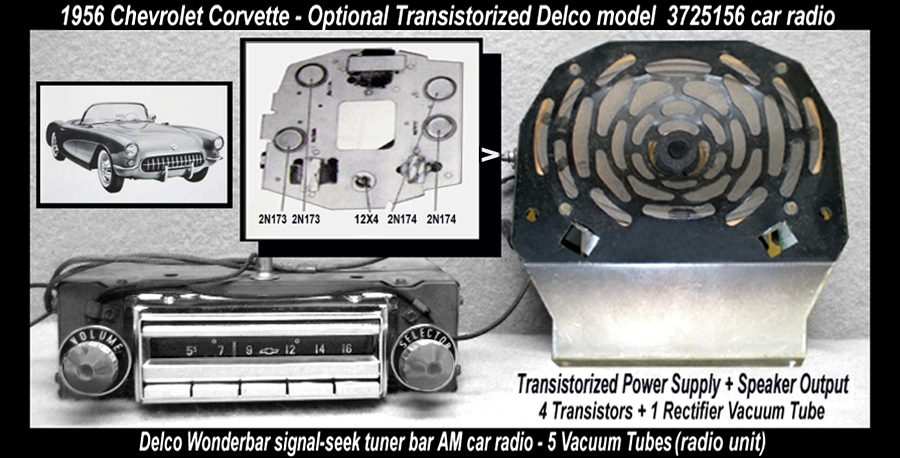
1956 Chevrolet Corvette Transistorized "Hybrid" (vacuum tubes and transistors) Car Radio option

In 1936, Delco began producing the first dashboard-installed car radios. By the early 1970s, Delco had become a major supplier of automotive electronics equipment. Based in Kokomo, Indiana, Delco Electronics employed more than 30,000 at its peak. In early 1956, Delco produced a transistorized hybrid signal-seeking car radio, which used both vacuum tubes and transistors in its radio's circuitry. Transistors were used to replace the radio's audio output vacuum tubes and also the vibrator. This transistorized hybrid radio was available as an option on the 1956 Chevrolet Corvette car models. In 1957, Delco produced an all-transistor signal-seeking car radio that was available for the 1957 Cadillac Eldorado Brougham car models.

=== Defense systems ===
In 1962, GM created the General Motors Research Laboratories, based in Santa Barbara, California, to conduct research and development activities on defense systems. This organization was eventually merged into Delco Electronics and renamed "Delco Systems Operations".

=== Environmental and safety systems ===
In 1974, Donald J. Atwood Jr. was appointed General Manager. The division was transformed in the following years as it grew to meet the needs of General Motors for engine and powertrain control modules to meet the U.S. government's strict 1981 Clean Air Act and other improved vehicle safety items including anti-skid brake system controllers and inflatable restraint (airbag) systems.

=== Hughes Electronics Corporation ===
In 1985, GM purchased Hughes Aircraft and merged it with Delco Electronics to form Hughes Electronics Corporation, an independent subsidiary.

=== Indy 500 ===
In 1993, Gary W Dickinson was appointed CEO of Delco Electronics. Gary Dickinson used Delco Electronics' involvement in the Development of electronics for GM auto racing as major promotional opportunity sponsoring an Indy 500 team and the Indy 500 Festival Parade from 1993 to 1997.

=== Reorganization ===
In 1997, all of the aerospace and defense businesses of Hughes Electronics (Hughes Aircraft and Delco Systems Operations) merged with defense contractor Raytheon; the Hughes Network Systems portion of Hughes Communications became DirecTV; and the commercial portion of Delco Electronics was transferred to GM's Delphi Automotive business.

On May 28, 1999, Delphi became a separate publicly traded company, and continued to use the Delco Electronics name for several of its subsidiaries until 2004.

Although Delco Electronics no longer exists as an operating company, GM still retains rights to the "Delco" name and uses it for some of its subsidiaries including the ACDelco parts division.

=== GM Components Holding ===
In 2009, as a result of Delphi Corporation's and General Motors' bankruptcy filings and realignment, it was agreed that GM would take back some of the Delphi plants it had previously owned as they manufactured key components necessary for GM, and organized into a new subsidiary, GM Components Holdings. This included all of the former Delco Electronics' plants in Kokomo, Indiana, where only a fraction of the previous manufacturing remains.

=== COVID-19 response ===
In 2020, in response to a growing shortage of ventilators due to the COVID-19 pandemic, General Motors announced a partnership with Ventec Life Systems to assist in increasing production of ventilators at their Kokomo facility.

== See also ==
- Childers Farmstead – a farm with a "Delco house" for generating electricity
