= Geoff Ferris (motorsport) =

British racing car designer

- Born: 2 August 1936 (age 89)

Geoff Ferris (born 2 August 1936) is a British racing car designer who has designed open-wheel racing cars for Penske Racing (Formula One and CART), Lotus (Formula One), Rebaque (Formula One) and Brabham (Formula 2, Formula Atlantic/B, Formula 3, and F5000).

He has twice (1980 and 1982) won the Louis Schwitzer Award for innovation and engineering excellence in the field of racing car design.
