= Xtrac Limited =

British engineering company

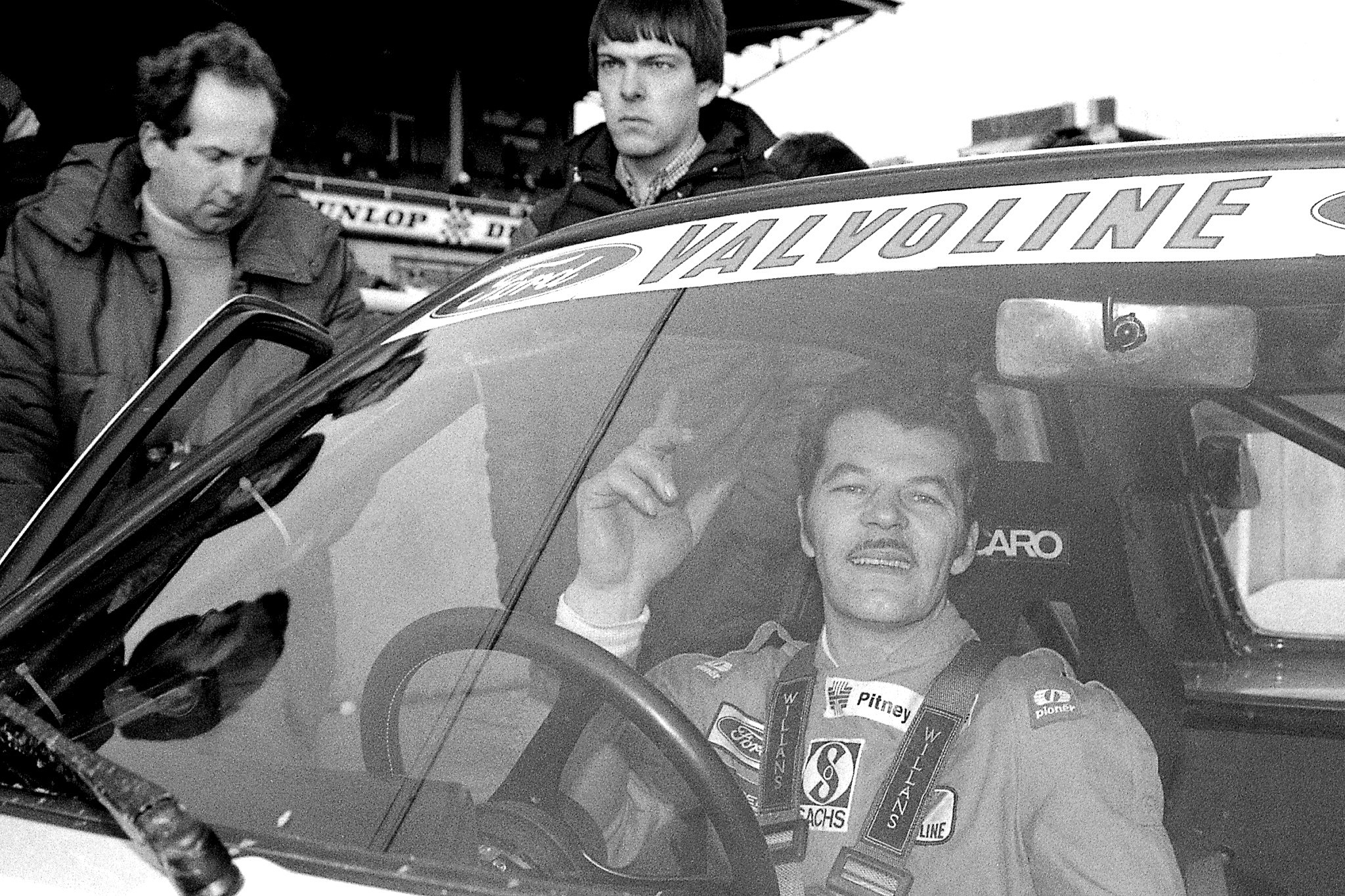
1983 British Rallycross GP: Martin Schanche and Mike Endean (left) presenting Xtrac No. 1 to the press

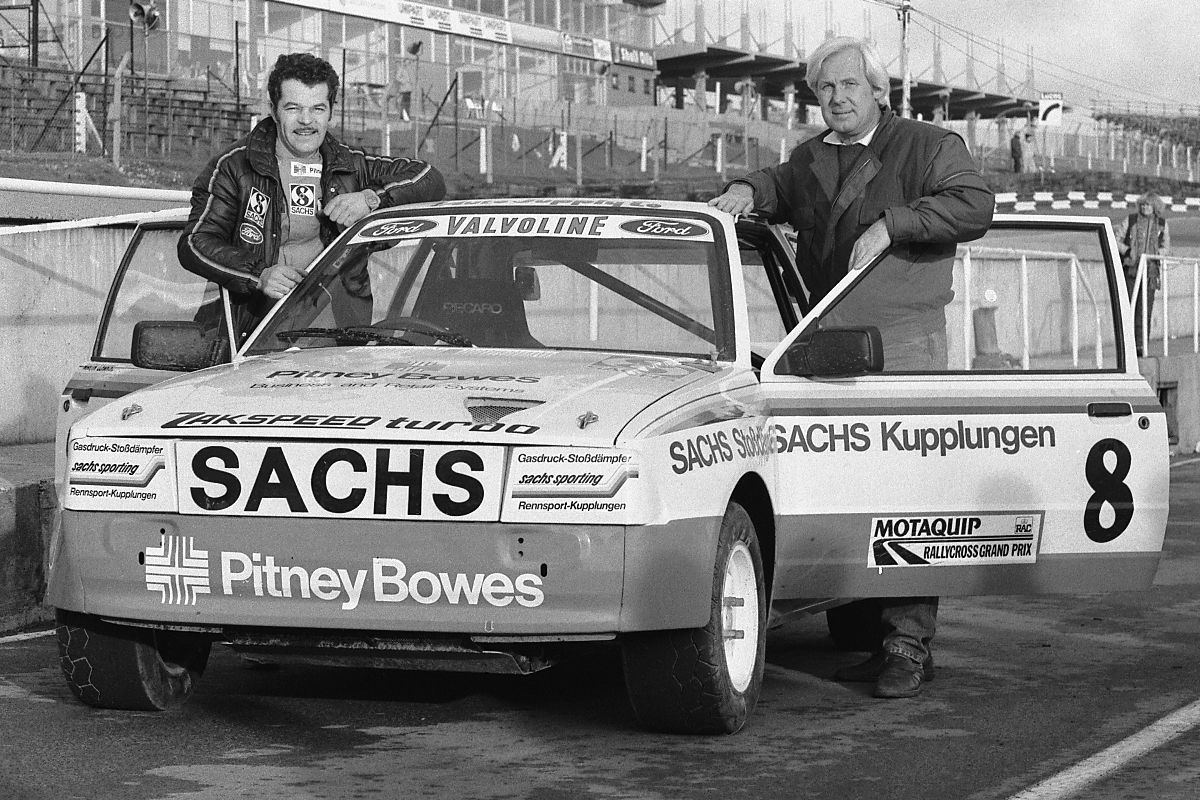
Martin Schanche and Erich Zakowski of Zakspeed pictured at the British Rallycross GP 1983 at Brands Hatch with the so-called Xtrac No. 1 Ford Escort Mk3 4WD for rallycross

Xtrac Limited, also known as Xtrac Transmission Technology, is a British engineering company founded in 1984 by the former Hewland engineer Mike Endean to make 4WD systems and gearboxes for rallycross and later rally and racing cars. Endean, together with Chris Goddard, who had been working on the electronic components essential to the system, in 1983 developed the first Xtrac 4WD system, for Norwegian rallycross star Martin Schanche. Schanche had thought up the idea of a changeable hydraulic 4WD system (his 1984 ERC winning Ford Escort Mk3 Xtrac-Zakspeed had a stepless FWD:RWD ratio of 28:72 to 50:50) and financed its development. This 560bhp so-called Xtrac No. 1 was bought by Endean, in the mid-1990s, who raced it himself for many a year in carsprints and hillclimbs.

"Xtrac started making gearboxes in the mid to late 1980s for the then-new Group A rally cars from their original premises in Wokingham and then continued to do so after moving in 1986 to a new 20,000 sq ft factory in Finchampstead".

In 2000, Xtrac built a bespoke 8,200 m^{2} (88,000 sq ft) high tech factory in Thatcham, Berkshire, England, and is currently supplying many top level sectors of motor sport, including F1, prototype and GT sportscars, IndyCar, Grand-AM, rally cars and touring cars. In 2010 the company supplied its complete 1044 gearbox, designed and developed in only six months to three F1 teams: Lotus, Virgin and HRT. This is mated to the Cosworth CA2010 engine.

In addition to supplying many high-profile motorsport customers, Xtrac has expanded in other areas such as automotive, marine and aerospace. The Pagani Huayra was a vehicle which used the Xtrac 1007 AMT transmission.

In 2019, it was announced that Xtrac would be the sole supplier of gearboxes for the US based NASCAR Championship, this was due to start in 2021, but with COVID-19 restrictions being in place this was delayed until 2022.

In 2020, it was announced that Xtrac would supply gearboxes as part of the hybrid power unit for the Le Mans Daytona h endurance hybrid sport cars, with Bosch supplying the motor generator unit and Williams Advanced Engineering supplying the batteries.
