= Louis Rhodes =

American engineer

Louis Rhodes (August 31, 1960 - ) is an American engineer. He was born at the Detroit Osteopathic Hospital in Michigan. He was employed as the director of design engineering at Chrysler LLC, an American automobile manufacturer. He has been in charge of various projects as the ME Four-Twelve, and the Chrysler Group's Minivan Stow ’n Go seating. On September 13, 2007, he was appointed president of ENVI, a division of Chrysler formed to develop electric-drive vehicles.

Louis Rhodes graduated from Western Michigan University (WMU) in 1983 with a Bachelor of Science in mechanical engineering. After graduating from WMU, Louis was appointed as the senior release engineer at General Motors until 1986. He was then employed from 1986 until 1987 as an engineering manager at Boeing Aircraft Company. From 1987 until 1993, he was the director of CAD/CAE services at MSX International. Since leaving MSX International in 1993, Louis Rhodes has been employed at Chrysler. He has held positions within the product engineering and product design organizations and has also been the director of advanced vehicle concepts and innovation groups.

== ME Four- Twelve ==
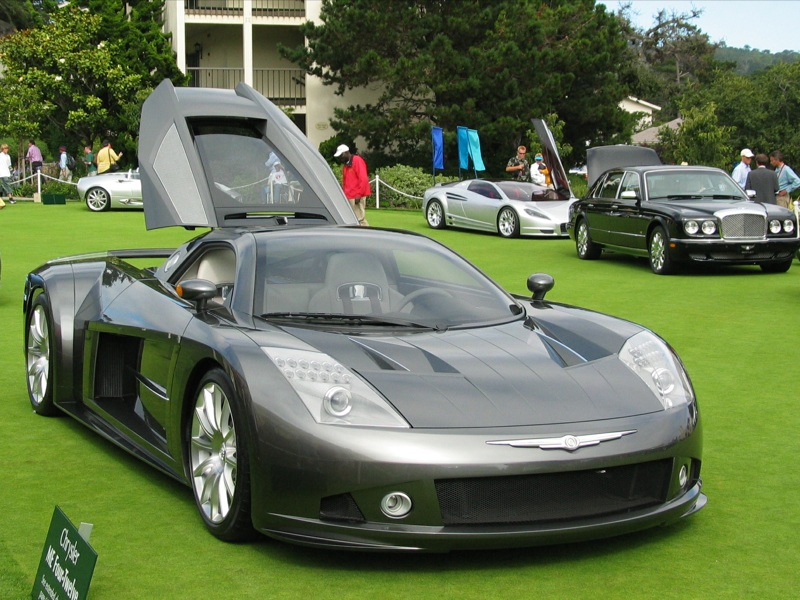
Chrysler ME Four-Twelve

One of Louis Rhodes's large projects as the Chrysler group's chief design engineer was the ME Four-Twelve concept car. Louis Rhodes worked in conjunction with Trevor Creed and Wolfgang Bernhard on the project, with an emphasis on keeping it a secret. In the efforts of secrecy, Louis only involved a few suppliers and had various code names for the car that could pinpoint the source of any leaked information. The ME Four-Twelve was unveiled at the 2004 Detroit auto show after being an idea merely 12 months prior. The ME Four-Twelve is made of aluminum honeycomb covered in carbon fiber panels. It can go from 0-to-60 mph in 2.9 seconds, with a top speed of 248 mph (399 km/h) and 850 hp (634 kW).

== Stow ’n Go ==
Louis Rhodes is also responsible for the creation of Stow ’n Go seating in the Chrysler Town & Country and the Dodge Grand Caravan minivans. Stow ’n Go seating became known to be a reality after Louis Rhodes and his son, Jonathan Rhodes, had been tinkering with an Erector Set in their kitchen . Stow ’n Go seating was revolutionary because unlike the fold on to the floor seating option offered in minivans, Stow ’n Go seating allows the second and third-rows of seats to fold into floor . For this revolutionary idea, Louis Rhodes received first place for the 2005 Walter P Chrysler Technology Award for U.S Patent No. 6,955,386 issued on October 18, 2005, for “underfloor stowage of a folding seat in a vehicle".

== ENVI ==
Louis Rhodes's most recent achievement is his appointment to the president of ENVI on September 13, 2007 . ENVI is Chrysler's vehicle development initiative that is focused on being environmentally responsible. The mission of ENVI is to design and produce Chrysler, Dodge, and Jeep vehicles that use pure electric or hybrid powertrains . At the 2008 North American International Auto Show, Chrysler LLC unveiled three environmentally friendly concept vehicles. The vehicles shown were the Chrysler ecoVoyager that would be powered by a lithium-ion battery pack, The Jeep Renegade with a Bluetec diesel, and the Dodge ZEO which would be an electric-only vehicle powered by a 64-kilowatt-hour lithium-ion battery.
