= Mercedes-Benz M120 engine =

V12 cylinder engine from 1991

Mercedes-Benz M 120 engine
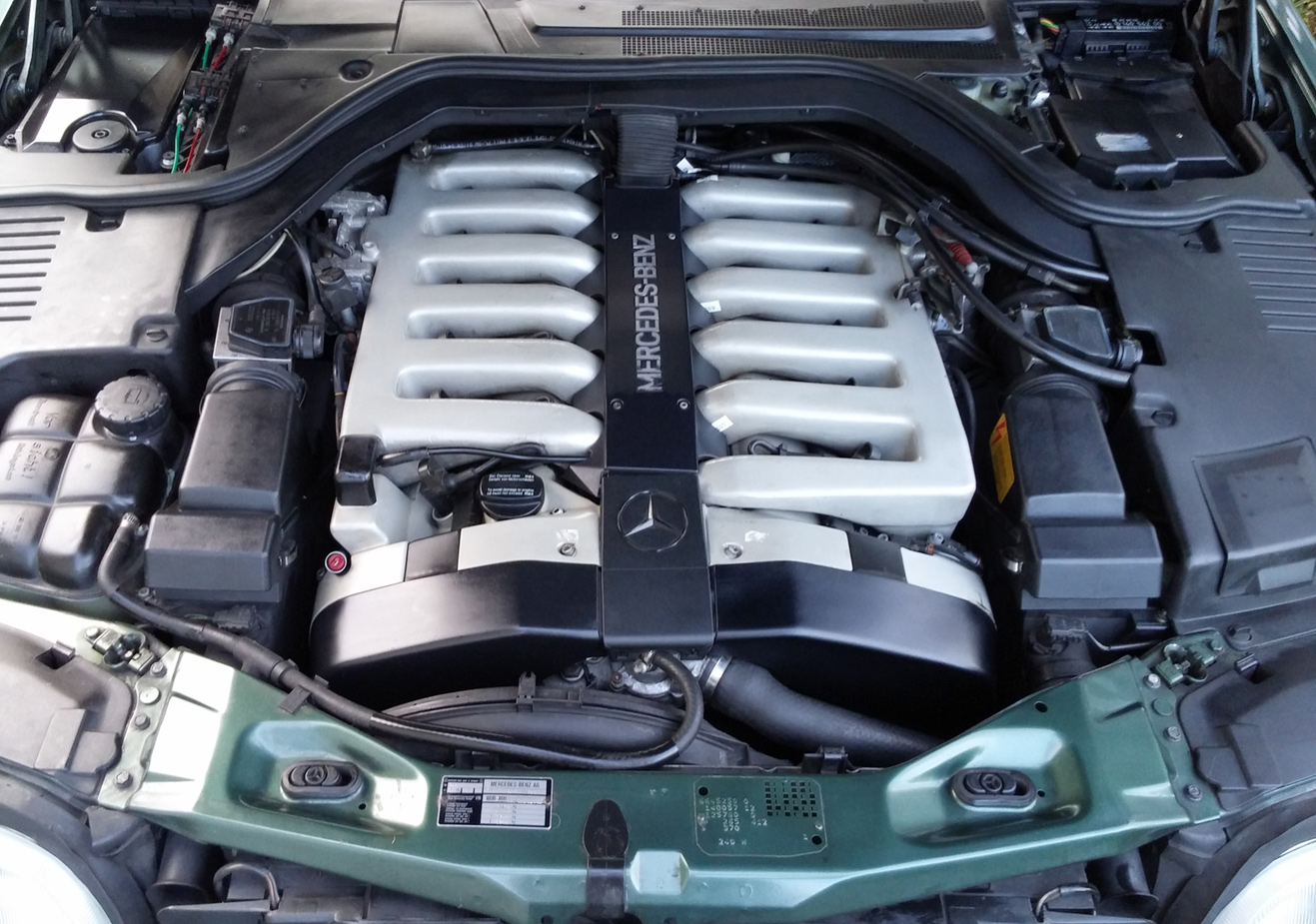

Overview
- Manufacturer: Mercedes-Benz

Layout
- Configuration: Naturally aspirated 60° V12
- Displacement: 6.0 L (5,991 cc); 7.0 L (7,010 cc); 7.1 L (7,055 cc); 7.3 L (7,291 cc)
- Cylinder bore: 89 mm (3.504 in); 91 mm (3.583 in); 91.5 mm (3.602 in)
- Piston stroke: 80.25 mm (3.159 in); 90.4 mm (3.559 in); 92.4 mm (3.638 in)
- Cylinder block material: Aluminium, Alusil bores
- Cylinder head material: Aluminium
- Valvetrain: DOHC 4 valves x cyl.

Combustion
- Fuel system: Sequential fuel injection
- Fuel type: Gasoline
- Cooling system: Water cooled

Output
- Power output: 394–850 PS (290–625 kW; 389–838 hp)

Chronology
- Predecessor: M 154
- Successor: M 137

The Mercedes-Benz M 120 engine is a naturally aspirated high-performance automobile piston V12 engine family used in the 1990s and 2000s in Mercedes-Benz' flagship models. The engine was a response to BMW's M70 V12 engine, introduced in 1987. While the 5-litre BMW unit developed 300 metric horsepower (221 kW), Mercedes-Benz upped the ante considerably by creating a 6-litre, 300-kilowatt (408 PS) engine.

The M 120 family was built in Stuttgart, Germany. It has an aluminium engine block lined with silicon/aluminium. The aluminium DOHC cylinder heads are 4 valves per cylinder designs. It uses sequential fuel injection (SFI) and features forged steel connecting rods.

The M 120 was eventually replaced by the smaller (5.8 litres), lesser-powered, short-lived, SOHC, three valves per cylinder M 137 V12 engine. Mercedes ceased production of the M 120 because of new emission rules.

== E 60 ==
This engine developed 394–408 PS (290–300 kW; 389–402 hp) and 420–428 lb⋅ft (569–580 N⋅m) of torque for the 6.0 L version. In 1992 only, the M 120 engine was offered in North America in 402 hp (300 kW; 408 PS) format and from 1991-92 408 PS (300 kW; 402 hp) in Europe. All other years (1993–1999) have the 394 PS (290 kW; 389 hp) version.

Applications:

- 1991–1998 600 SE / 600 SEL / S 600 (W140)
- 1992–1999 600 SEC / S 600 Coupé / CL 600 (C140)
- 1992–2001 600 SL / SL 600 (R129)
- 1991 C112 Concept
- 2004 Chrysler ME-412
- 1993 Isdera Commendatore 112i
- 2005 Laraki Borac
- 2003 Laraki Fulgura
- 2000 Lotec Sirius (with twin-turbo version of M 120 engine)
- 1996–1999 Mega Monte Carlo
- 1992–2000 Mega Track

== E 70 AMG ==
A 7.1 litres (7,055 cc) version was also used in the SL 70 AMG, S 70 AMG and CL 70 AMG, and produced 365 kW (496 PS; 489 hp). Another 7.1 litres (7,055 cc) version with 380 kW (517 PS; 510 hp) was used for SL 72 AMG, S 72 AMG and CL 72 AMG cars.

== E 73 AMG ==
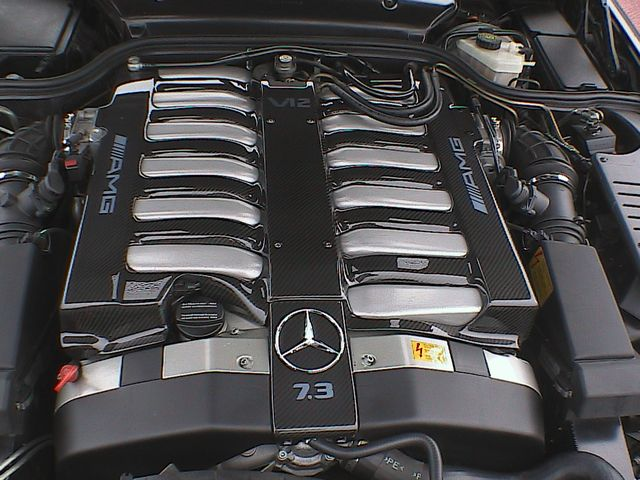
M 120 E73 AMG engine

There was also a 7.3 L version producing 525 PS (386 kW; 518 hp) developed by AMG which was used in the SL 73 AMG. The 7.3 L M 120 engine was also featured in the AMG-built, S 73 T Kombi, a custom-built W140 S-Class wagon for the Sultan of Brunei. Eighteen units were produced, ten of which went to the Sultan.

== M 297 ==
In 1997, the FIA GT Championship race car Mercedes-Benz CLK GTR was fitted with the M 297 engine, derived from the M 120. The 25 road cars, required by the FIA rules and delivered in 1999, had their engine enlarged to 6.9 L.

== Pagani Zonda ==
The Pagani Zonda has used three different capacities of Mercedes-AMG tuned versions of the M 120 engine, starting with the untuned 6.0 L for the original Zonda C12 to a 7.0 L version for the C12-S and Zonda GR, then to the 7.3 L for the Zonda S 7.3/Zonda Roadster, and back to the 6.0 L for the Zonda R and the Zonda Revolución. The bore and stroke of the 7.3 L version is 91.5 mm × 92.4 mm (3.602 in × 3.638 in).

Applications:

Year	Model	Displacement	Power output
1999	Pagani Zonda C12	5,991 cc (6.0 L; 365.6 cu in)	408 PS (300 kW; 402 hp) or 450 PS (331 kW; 444 hp)
1999	Pagani Zonda C12-S	7,010 cc (7.0 L; 427.8 cu in)	550 PS (405 kW; 542 hp)
2002	Pagani Zonda S 7.3 / Zonda Roadster	7,291 cc (7.3 L; 444.9 cu in)	555 PS (408 kW; 547 hp)
2003	Pagani Zonda GR	7,010 cc (7.0 L; 427.8 cu in)	600 PS (441 kW; 592 hp)
2009	Pagani Zonda R	5,991 cc (6.0 L; 365.6 cu in)	750 PS (552 kW; 740 hp)
2012	Pagani Zonda R Evoluzione	5,991 cc (6.0 L; 365.6 cu in)	760 PS (559 kW; 750 hp)
2012	Pagani Zonda Revolución	5,991 cc (6.0 L; 365.6 cu in)	800 PS (588 kW; 789 hp)
2014	Pagani Zonda R "Revolución Specification"	5,991 cc (6.0 L; 365.6 cu in)	780 PS (574 kW; 769 hp)
2021	Pagani Huayra R	5,991 cc (6.0 L; 365.6 cu in)	850 PS (625 kW; 838 hp)
2024	Pagani Huayra R Roadster	5,991 cc (6.0 L; 365.6 cu in)	900 PS (662 kW; 888 hp)

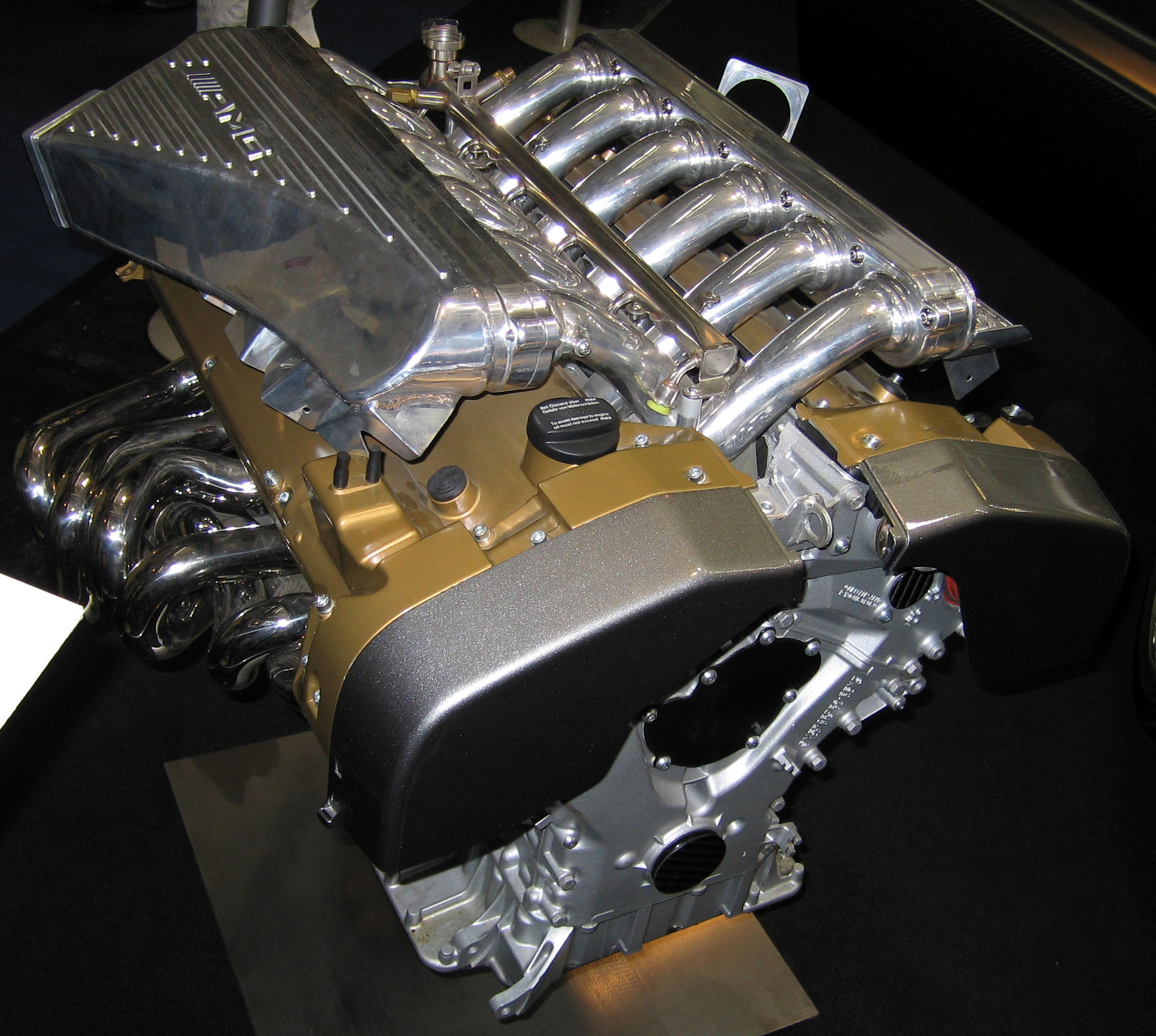
Pagani Zonda F engine

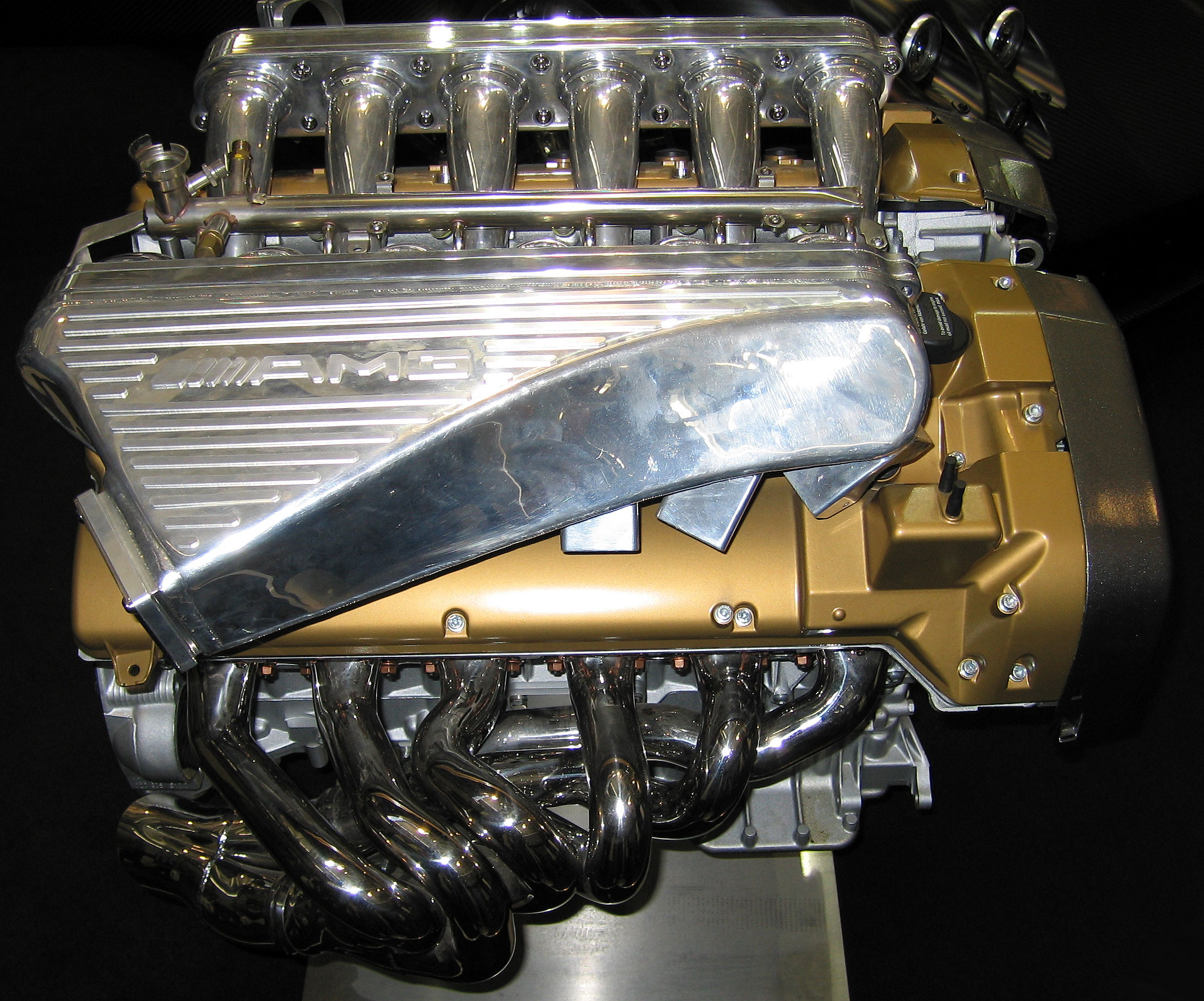
Pagani Zonda F engine

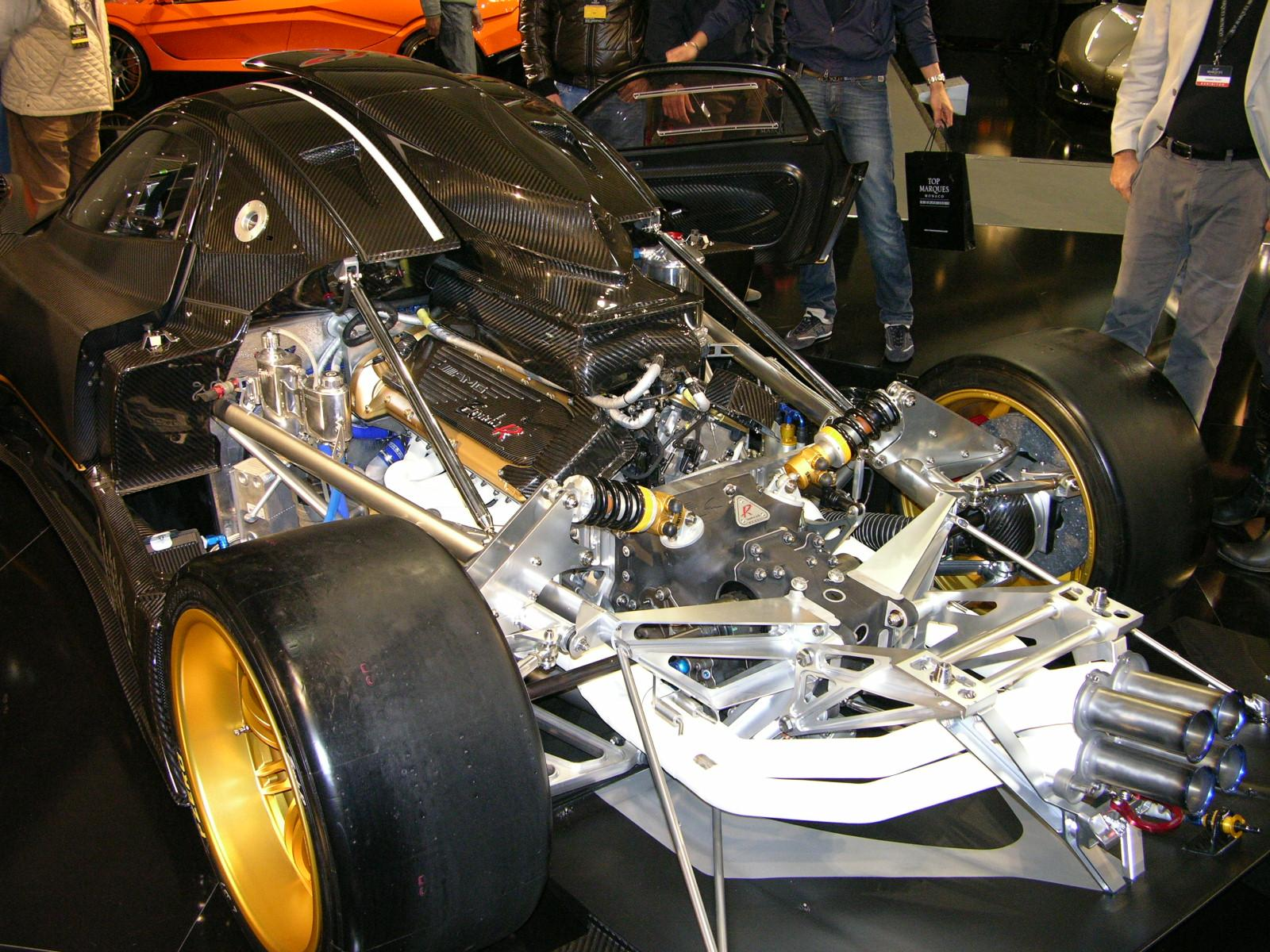
Pagani Zonda R engine bay

== See also ==
- List of Mercedes-Benz engines
