= Mercedes-Benz M297 engine =

Mercedes-Benz M297
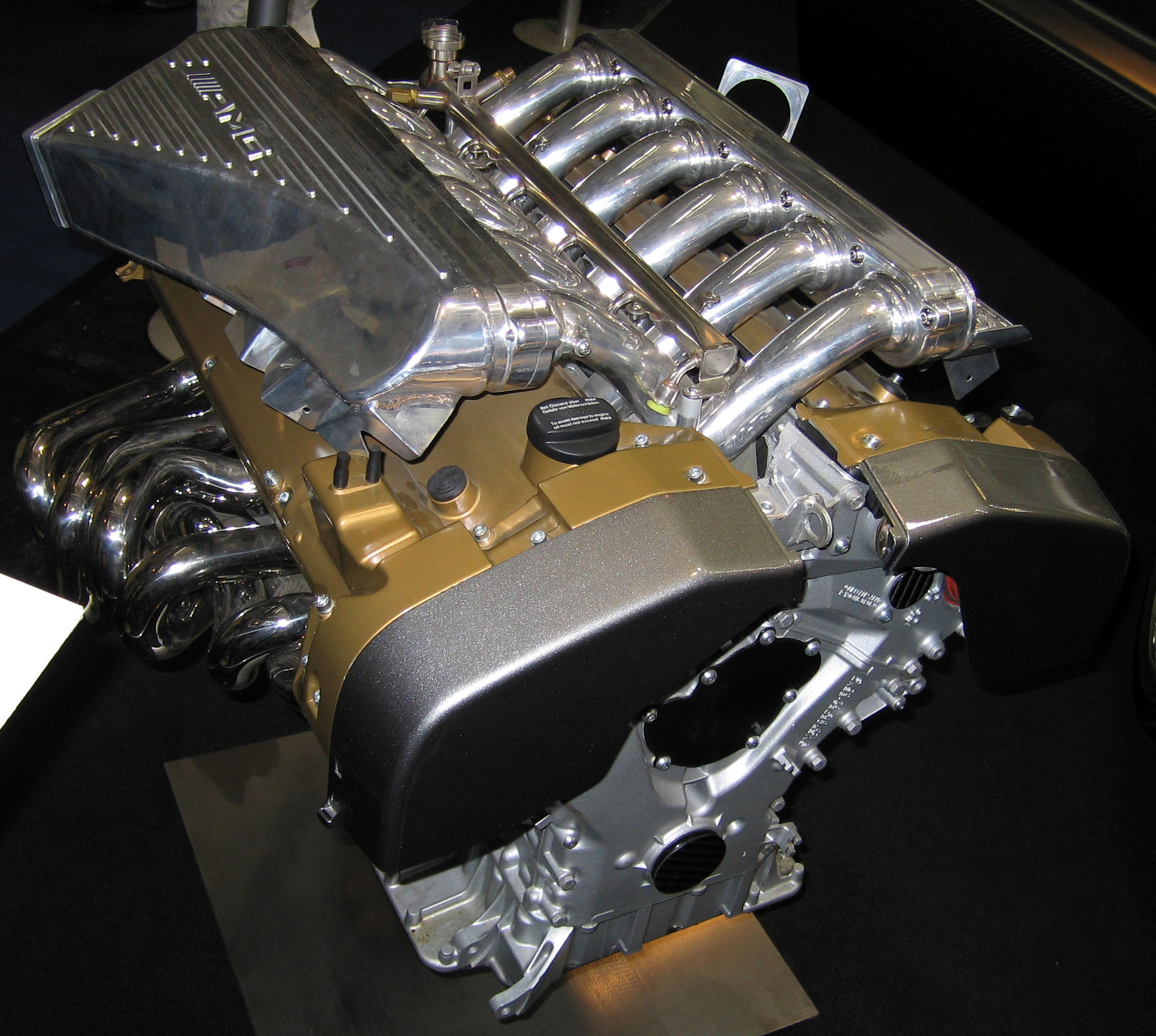
- Pagani Zonda F M297 engine

Overview
- Manufacturer: Mercedes-Benz
- Production: 1997–2016

Layout
- Configuration: Naturally aspirated 60° V12
- Displacement: 6.9 L; 420.9 cu in (6,898 cc); 7.3 L; 444.9 cu in (7,291 cc)
- Cylinder bore: 89 mm (3.5 in); 91.5 mm (3.60 in)
- Piston stroke: 92.4 mm (3.64 in)
- Cylinder block material: Aluminium alloy
- Cylinder head material: Aluminium silicon
- Valvetrain: DOHC 4 valves x cyl.
- Compression ratio: 10.5:1; 10.0:1 (SL 73 AMG)

Combustion
- Fuel system: Multi-point fuel injection
- Fuel type: Gasoline
- Cooling system: Water-cooled

Output
- Power output: 386–559 kW (525–760 PS; 518–750 hp)
- Torque output: 750–900 N⋅m (553–664 lb⋅ft)

Chronology
- Predecessor: Mercedes-Benz M163 engine
- Successor: Mercedes-Benz M158 engine Mercedes-Benz M137 engine (AMG)

The M297 is a V12 engine produced by Mercedes-Benz, from 1997 to 2016. Engine code was derived from the CLK GTR's C297 chassis code.

== Design ==
The M297 is based on the M120 engine but has been tuned by AMG for use in high-performance sports cars. It was offered as a 6.9 L (6,898 cc) version with a bore and stroke of 89 mm × 92.4 mm (3.50 in × 3.64 in), respectively, and was only available in the road-legal version of the CLK GTR. A 7.3 L (7,291 cc) unit was also available featuring a larger bore of 91.5 mm (3.60 in), and was used in Pagani Zonda models until 2016.

== Engines ==
Displacement	Power output	at rpm	Torque	at rpm	Years
6,898 cc (6.9 L; 420.9 cu in)	464 kW (631 PS; 622 hp)	6,800	731 N⋅m (539 lb⋅ft)	5,250	1997-1999
7,291 cc (7.3 L; 444.9 cu in)	386 kW (525 PS; 518 hp)	5,500	750 N⋅m (553 lb⋅ft)	4,000	1997–2001
7,291 cc (7.3 L; 444.9 cu in)	408 kW (555 PS; 547 hp)	5,900	750 N⋅m (553 lb⋅ft)	4,050	2001–2006
7,291 cc (7.3 L; 444.9 cu in)	442 kW (601 PS; 593 hp)	6,150	760 N⋅m (561 lb⋅ft)	4,000	2004–2008
7,291 cc (7.3 L; 444.9 cu in)	478 kW (650 PS; 641 hp)	6,200	780–900 N⋅m (575–664 lb⋅ft)	4,000	2006–2011
7,291 cc (7.3 L; 444.9 cu in)	492 kW (669 PS; 660 hp)	6,200	780–900 N⋅m (575–664 lb⋅ft)	4,000	2010
7,291 cc (7.3 L; 444.9 cu in)	498 kW (677 PS; 668 hp)	6,200	780–900 N⋅m (575–664 lb⋅ft)	4,000	2009–2010
7,291 cc (7.3 L; 444.9 cu in)	559 kW (760 PS; 750 hp)	8,000	780–900 N⋅m (575–664 lb⋅ft)	3,900	2012–2016
7,291 cc (7.3 L; 444.9 cu in)	588.5 kW (800 PS; 789 hp)	8,000	780–900 N⋅m (575–664 lb⋅ft)	3,900	2017

464 kW version

- 1997–1999 CLK GTR Straßenversion (6.9 L)

488 kW version

- 1998 CLK GTR Straßenversion SuperSport (7.3 L)

450 kW version

- 2002 CLK GTR Straßenversion Roadster (6.9 L)

== Pagani Zonda ==
M297, the most powerful iterations replaced the M120 in the Pagani Zonda, powering every single version of the supercar (there were many) built from 2002 onwards.

442 kW version

- 2005–2008 Pagani Zonda F

478 kW version

- 2006–2011 Pagani Zonda F Clubsport
- 2006–2009 Pagani Zonda Roadster F
- 2009 Pagani Zonda PS

492 kW version

- 2010 Pagani Zonda Tricolore

498 kW version

- 2009–2010 Pagani Zonda Cinque
- 2010 Pagani Zonda Cinque Roadster
- 2010 Pagani Zonda HH

559 kW version

- 2012 Pagani Zonda 760
- 2012 Pagani Zonda 760LH
- 2012 Pagani Zonda 760RS
- 2012 Pagani Zonda 764 Passione
- 2014 Pagani Zonda LM
- 2014 Pagani Zonda X
- 2015 Pagani Zonda 760 Zozo
- 2015 Pagani Zonda 760 AG Roadster
- 2015 Pagani Zonda Kiryu
- 2016 Pagani Zonda OLIVER Evolution

588.5 kW version

- 2017 Pagani Zonda HP Barchetta

Applications:

Year	Model	Displacement	Power output
2005	Pagani Zonda F	7,291 cc (7.3 L; 444.9 cu in)	602 PS (443 kW; 594 hp)
2005	Pagani Zonda F Clubsport / Zonda Roadster F	7,291 cc (7.3 L; 444.9 cu in)	650 PS (478 kW; 641 hp)
2009	Pagani Zonda Cinque / Zonda Cinque Roadster	7,291 cc (7.3 L; 444.9 cu in)	678 PS (499 kW; 669 hp)
2010	Pagani Zonda Tricolore	7,291 cc (7.3 L; 444.9 cu in)	670 PS (493 kW; 661 hp)
2012	Pagani Zonda 760	7,291 cc (7.3 L; 444.9 cu in)	760 PS (559 kW; 750 hp)
2017	Pagani Zonda HP Barchetta	7,291 cc (7.3 L; 444.9 cu in)	800 PS (588 kW; 789 hp)
