= Pagani Zonda =

Mid-engine sports car by Pagani

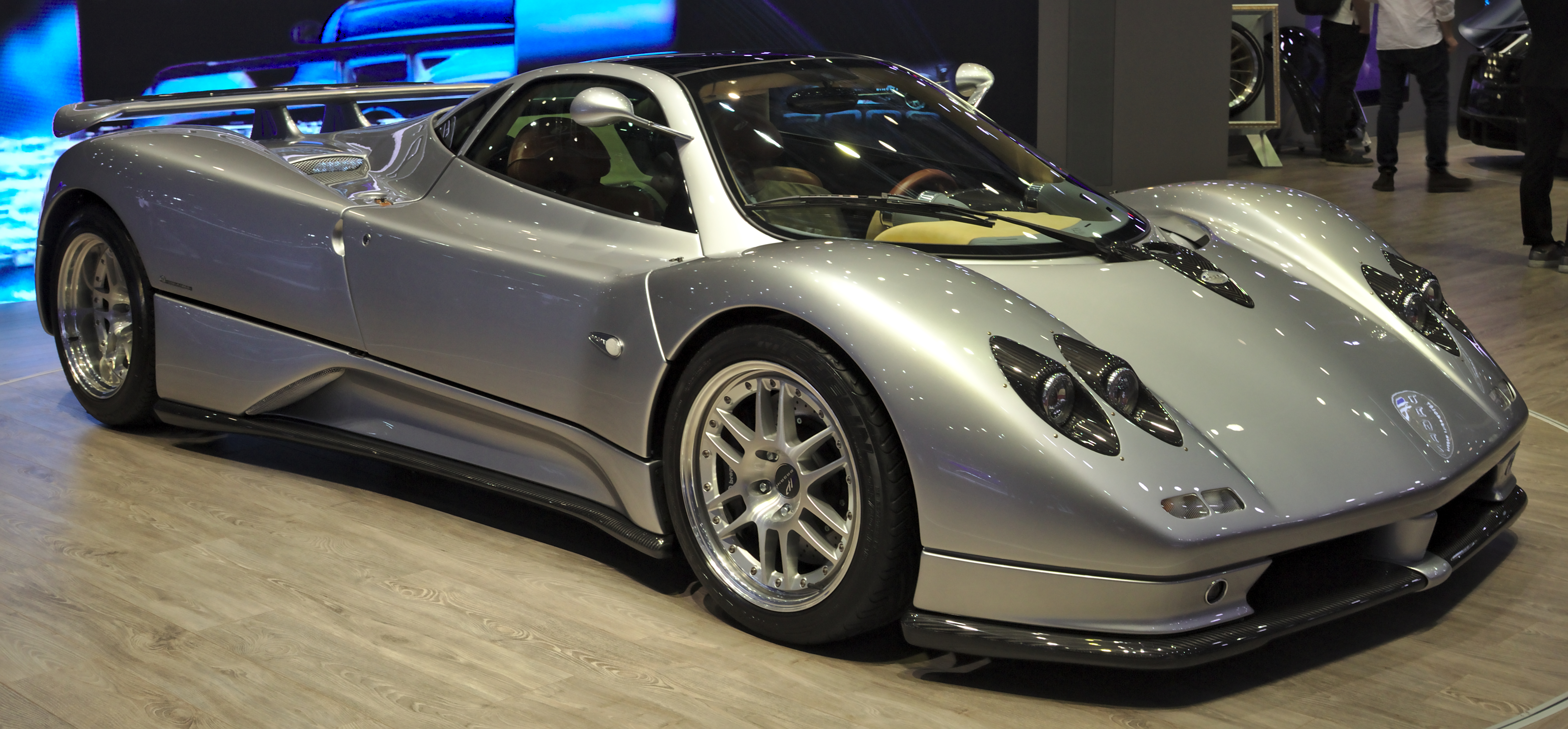
- Pagani Zonda C12 (chassis no. 001) at the 2019 Geneva Motor Show

Overview
- Manufacturer: Pagani Automobili
- Production: 1999–2019 (special edition/one-off models still occasionally built in limited numbers)
- Assembly: Italy: San Cesario sul Panaro
- Designer: Horacio Pagani

Body and chassis
- Class: Sports car (S)
- Body style: 2-door berlinetta; 2-door roadster; 2-door barchetta
- Layout: Rear mid-engine, rear-wheel-drive
- Related: Pagani Zonda R

Powertrain
- Engine: 6.0 – 7.3 L Mercedes-Benz M120 V12; 7.3 L Mercedes-Benz M297 V12
- Transmission: 5-speed manual; 6-speed manual; 6-speed automated manual; 7-speed automated manual

Dimensions
- Wheelbase: 2,730 mm (107.5 in)
- Length: 4,395–4,435 mm (173.0–174.6 in)
- Width: 2,055 mm (80.9 in)
- Height: 1,151–1,141 mm (45.3–44.9 in)
- Curb weight: Dry weight: 1,250 kg (2,756 lb) (C12); 1,280 kg (2,822 lb) (S, Roadster); 1,230 kg (2,712 lb) (F, Roadster F); 1,210 kg (2,668 lb) (Cinque, Cinque Roadster, Tricolore); 1,070 kg (2,359 lb) (R, Revolución); 1,250 kg (2,756 lb) (HP Barchetta)

Chronology
- Successor: Pagani Huayra

Pagani Zonda F at the Goodwood festival of speed

The Pagani Zonda is a mid-engine sports car produced by Italian sports car manufacturer Pagani Automobili. It debuted at the 1999 Geneva Motor Show. Produced on commission in limited units, as of 2019 a total of 140 cars had been built, including development mules. Variants include a two-door coupé and roadster variant, along with a third new variant being the barchetta. Construction is mainly of carbon fibre.

The Zonda was originally to be named the "Fangio F1" after Formula One champion Juan Manuel Fangio, but, following his death in 1995, it was renamed for the Zonda wind, a term for a hot air current above Argentina.

== Model variants ==
=== Zonda C12 ===
The Zonda C12 debuted in 1999 at the Geneva Motor Show. It is powered by a 6.0 L (366 cu in) Mercedes-Benz M120 V12 engine having a power output of either 408 PS (300 kW; 402 hp) or 450 PS (331 kW; 444 hp) at 5,200 rpm and 570–640 N⋅m (420–472 lb⋅ft) of torque at 4,200 rpm mated to a five-speed manual transmission.

The C12 can accelerate to 97 km/h (60 mph) in 4.0 seconds and to 161 km/h (100 mph) in 9.2 seconds.

Only five cars were built with the 6.0 L engine, though the C12 was still available in 2002 when the C12 S was introduced. One was used for crash testing and homologation, while another was a demonstrator and show car. The remainder were delivered to customers during the next three years. The crash test and homologation car having chassis number 001 was restored by Pagani's recently established restoration program called "Pagani Rinascimento" and was presented to the public at the 2019 Geneva Motor Show for the Zonda's 20th anniversary.

=== Zonda C12-S ===
The Zonda C12-S uses a modified version of the M120 V12 engine used in the C12 enlarged to 7,010 cc (7.0 L; 427.8 cu in). Tuned by Mercedes-AMG, the engine has a power output of 550 PS (405 kW; 542 hp) and is mated to a newly developed CIMA 6-speed manual transmission in order to handle the high power output produced by the engine.

The C12-S can accelerate to 100 km/h (62 mph) in 3.7 seconds, and to 161 km/h (100 mph) in 7.0 seconds. Lateral acceleration on the skidpad is 1.18 g (11.6 m/s²). The C12-S can reach a top speed of 208 mph (335 km/h).

=== Zonda S 7.3 ===
Introduced in 2002 the Zonda S 7.3 used a new, larger naturally aspirated M120 V12 engine displacing 7,291 cc (7.3 L; 444.9 cu in) designed and manufactured by Mercedes-AMG having a power output of 555 PS (547 hp; 408 kW) at 5,900 rpm and 750 N⋅m (553 lb⋅ft) of torque at 4,050 rpm. To better handle the power, traction control and ABS were made standard. Performance claims were unchanged from the Zonda C12-S.

==== Zonda Roadster ====
In 2003, Pagani presented the Zonda Roadster, an open top version of the Zonda S 7.3. Carrying the same components as the coupé, Pagani promised no loss of performance, a claim supported by the minimal weight gain of 30 kg (66 lb). A total of 40 roadsters were produced.

=== Zonda F ===
The Zonda F (or Zonda Fangio - named after Formula One driver Juan Manuel Fangio) debuted at the 2005 Geneva Motor Show. It was the most extensive re-engineered variant of the Zonda yet, even though it shared much with its predecessors, it featured an all new 7.3 L Mercedes-AMG M297 V12 engine which through enhanced intake manifolds, exhaust and a revised ECU now had a power output of 602 PS (443 kW; 594 hp) at 6,150 rpm and 760 N⋅m (561 lb⋅ft) at 4,000 rpm. The transmission is largely the same as the C12 S but had stronger internals and differential gears. Zonda F has a top speed of 345 km/h (214 mph).

Production of the Zonda F was limited to 25 cars. It came equipped with an extra headlight and a new configuration of fog lights in the lower grille, new bodywork (revised front end, new rear spoiler, more aerodynamic vents all around) that improved the car's aerodynamics, and different side mirrors. Further enhancements over the "S" centered on optional carbon/ceramic brakes (measuring 380 mm) developed in conjunction with Brembo, OZ alloy wheels, Inconel exhaust system, hydroformed aluminium intake plenum, and a redesigned "Z preg" weave in the crash structure to improve rigidity and reduce weight.

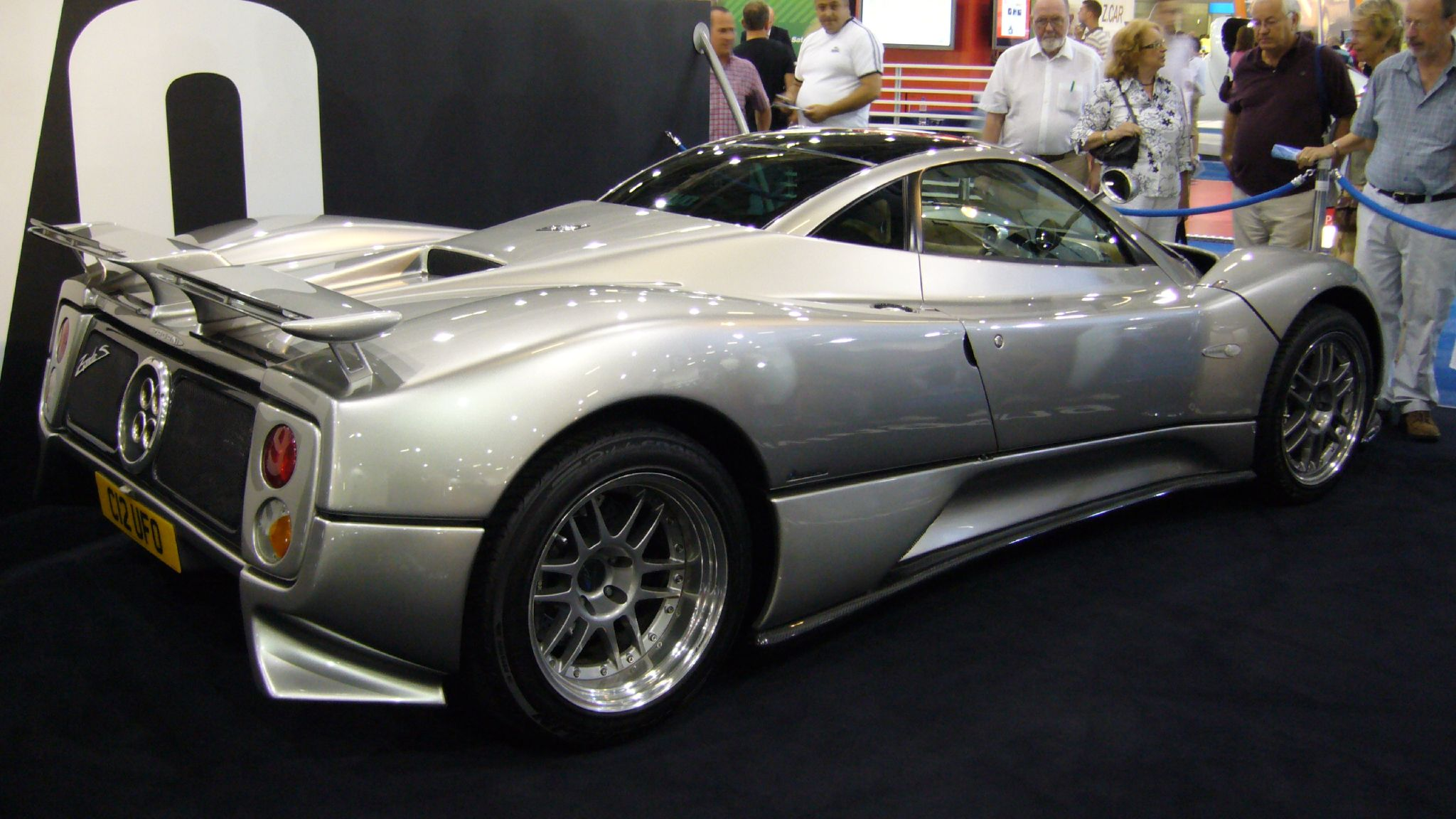
Zonda C12-S, rear view

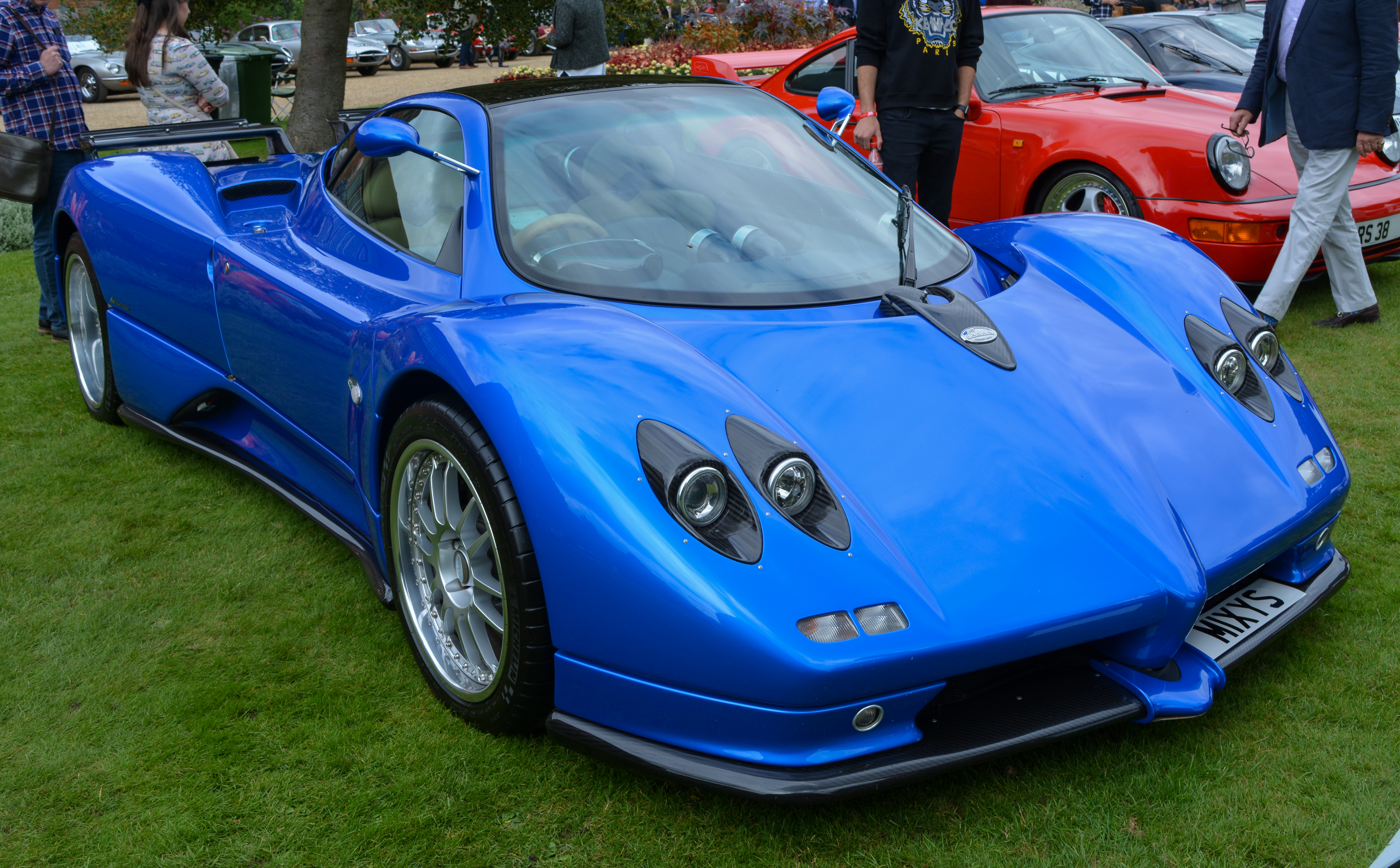
Zonda S 7.3

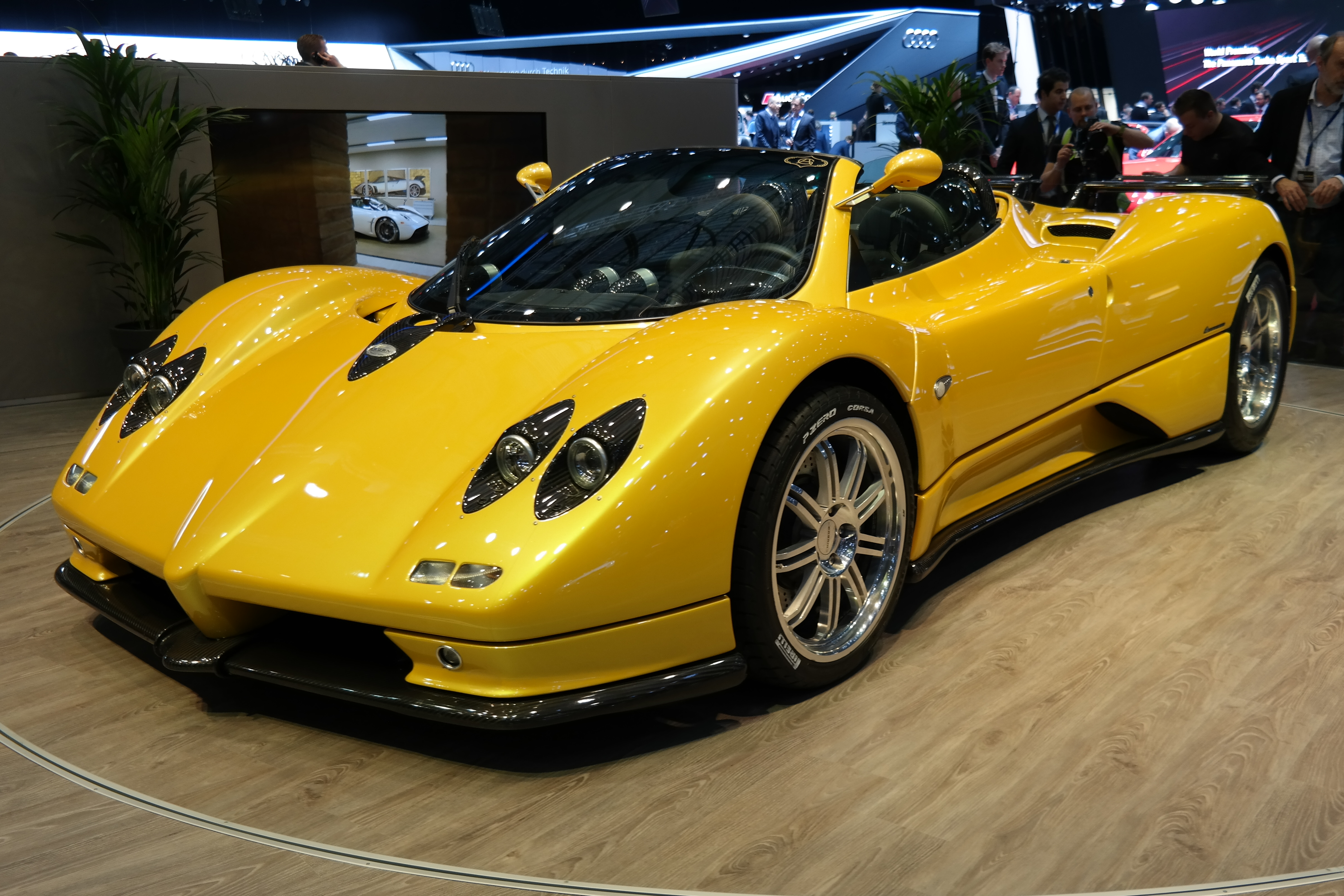
Zonda S 7.3 Roadster

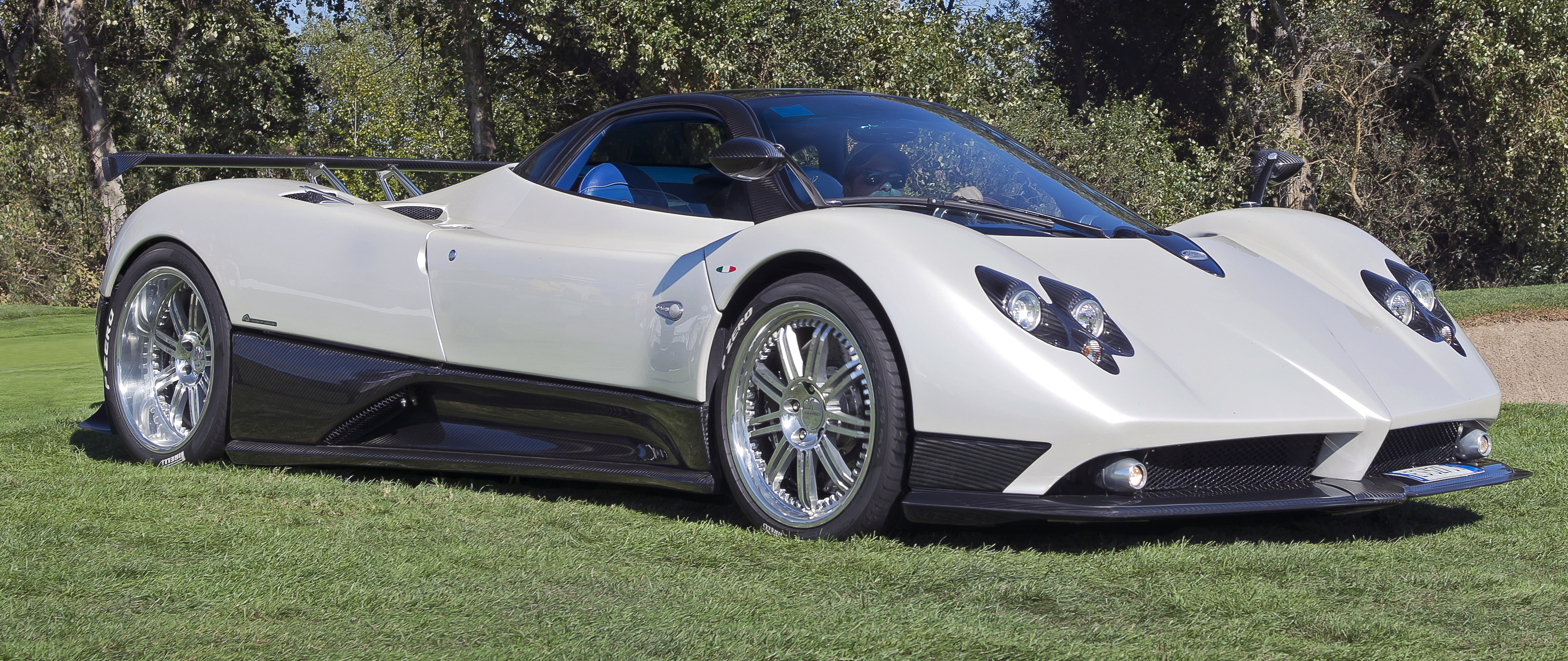
Zonda F

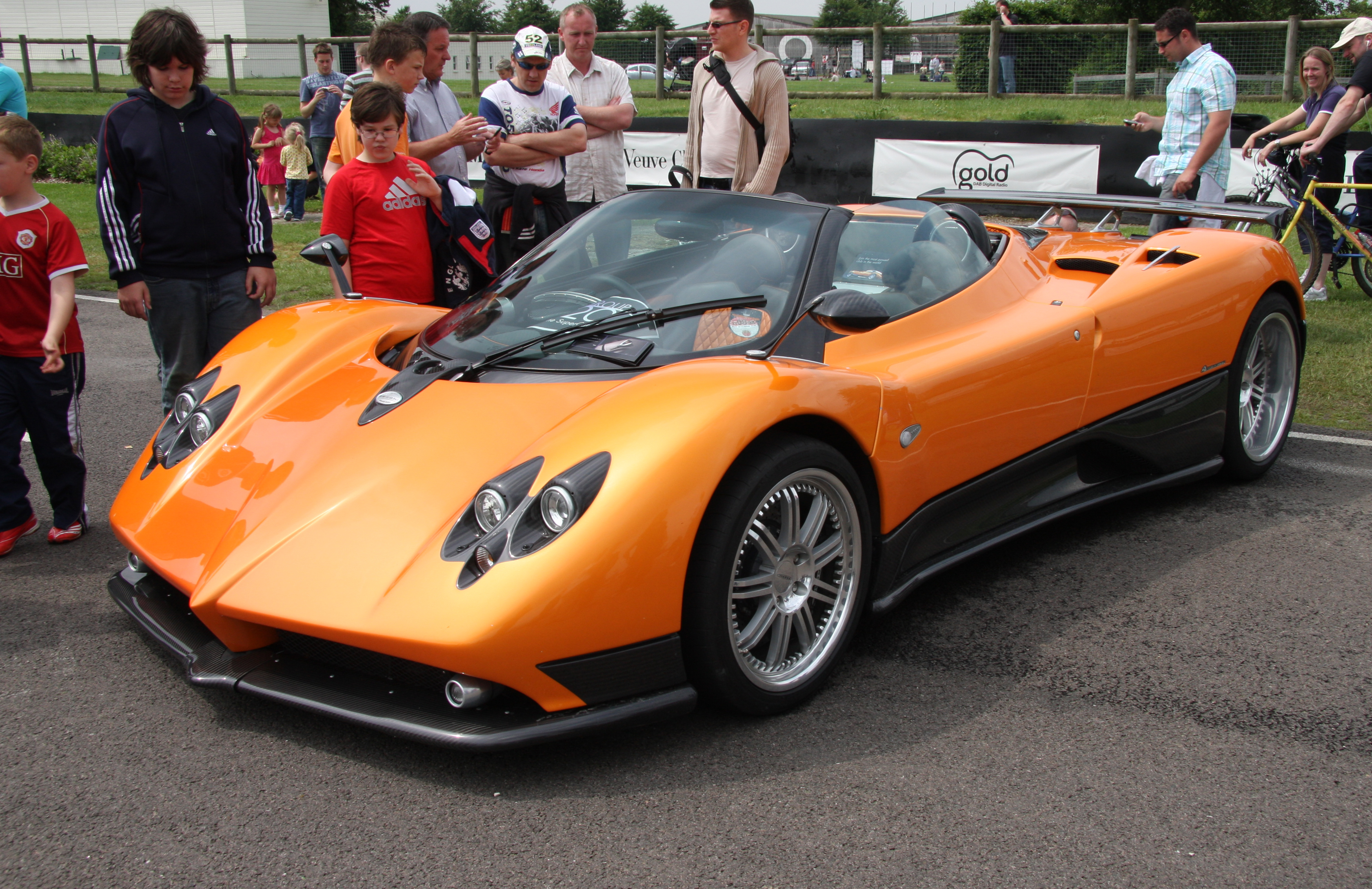
Zonda Roadster F

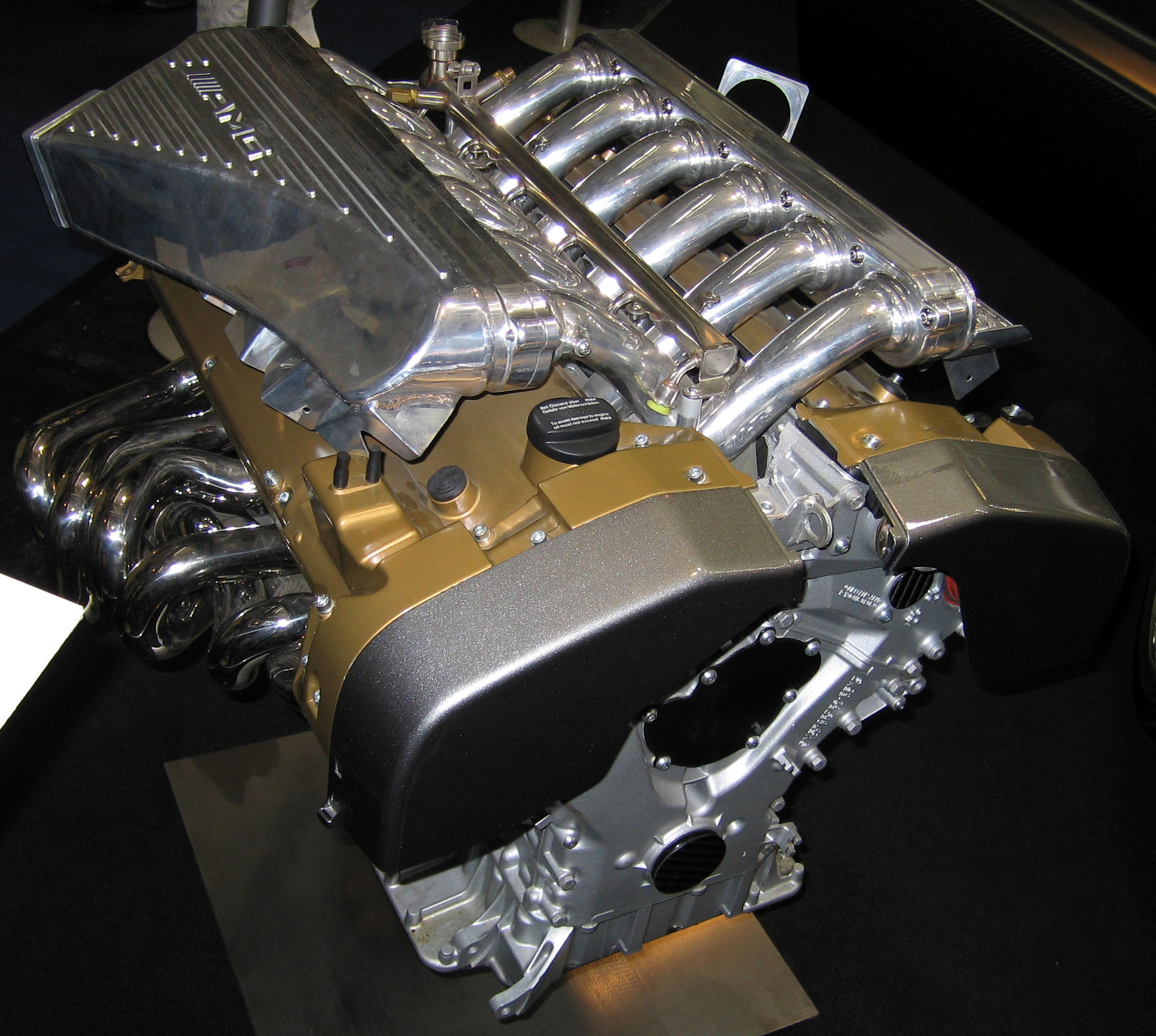
Engine (Zonda F)

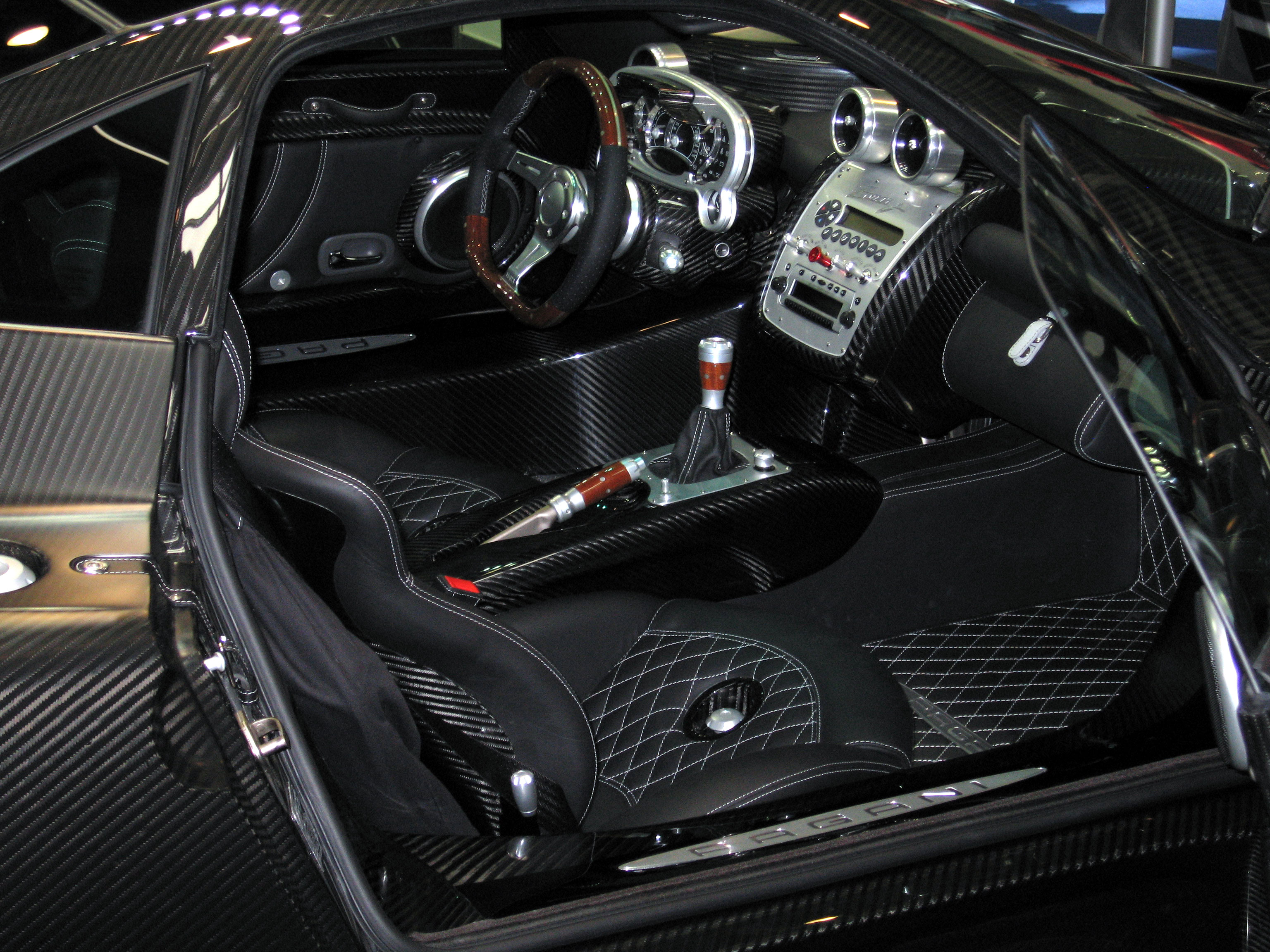
Zonda F interior

==== Zonda Roadster F ====
The Zonda Roadster F debuted at the 2006 Geneva Motor Show. Exterior wise, the roadster was similar to the coupé, but with a removable carbon fibre roof and canvas side curtains, weighing just 5 kg (11 lb) more than the coupé. Power output of the engine increased to 650 PS (478 kW; 641 hp) and 780 N⋅m (575 lb⋅ft) of torque. Production of the Roadster F was limited to 25 units.

The Roadster F maintained chassis rigidity without any gain in curb weight, eschewing conventional thinking by not strengthening the sills, a process which would have needed more than 35 kg (77 lb) of reinforcement. Pagani instead used racing car materials, and construction techniques, strengthening the firewall structure of the chassis tub together with billet alloy braces that connected the points where the roof rails would have joined. The windscreen was also strengthened for safety reasons. These techniques enabled the Roadster to have virtually the same weight as the coupé, 1,230 kg (2,712 lb).

The Zonda Roadster F Clubsport is a lightweight version of the Zonda Roadster F. It has an extensive use of the new carbo-titanium material developed by Pagani as well as having an upgraded engine. It was tested by Top Gear's The Stig along with James May and achieved a lap time around their test track of 1:17.8, beating the Bugatti Veyron 16.4 tested during the same episode, but lost in a quarter mile drag race against the Veyron by nearly 2.5 seconds. German racing driver Marc Basseng managed to lap the Zonda F Clubsport around the 20.8 kilometres (12.9 mi) Nürburgring Nordschleife in 7:24.7.

=== Zonda R ===
In 2007, Pagani introduced the Zonda R at the Geneva Motor Show, a track-only version of the Pagani Zonda.

=== Zonda Cinque ===
The Zonda Cinque (Italian for five) was meant to be the last iteration of the Zonda, being a road-legal version of the Zonda R. Only five were built, hence the name, with deliveries set to June 2009 for all five cars. The Zonda Cinque was developed at the request of a Pagani dealer in Hong Kong.

The differences from other variants of the Zonda were the new 6-speed automated manual gearbox, resulting in shifts taking less than 100 milliseconds, dropping the 0–100 km/h (62 mph) acceleration time down to 3.4 seconds. The gearbox has three driving modes, namely Comfort, Sport and Race which optimises the gearbox for different driving conditions. The Cinque also had a revised form of carbon fibre called "carbo-titanium" which incorporates titanium in the weave to increase strength and rigidity. The suspension used magnesium and titanium components, and the 7.3-litre engine's power and torque were increased to 678 PS (499 kW; 669 hp) and 780 N⋅m (575 lb⋅ft). Revised bodywork, which included a longer front splitter, new sideskirts, rear diffuser, bumper canards, and a flatter underside as well as a roof-mounted air intake scoop, enabled the Cinque to generate 750 kg (1,653 lb) of down-force at 355 km/h (221 mph) and 1.45 G of cornering force.

The Zonda Cinque Roadster had the same specifications as the coupé from which it was derived. Only five units were built, like the coupé.

==== Zonda Tricolore ====
The Zonda Tricolore, originally conceived as a one-off before production totaled three, was built as a tribute to the Frecce Tricolori, Italy's aerobatic team. It carried much of the body from the Zonda Cinque. The car was unpainted except for a clear blue lacquer, and red, white, and green stripes from the nose along the top of the car's surface. Unique to this car was a small wing placed behind the cockpit which reflected the tail wing of Frecce Tricolori's Aermacchi MB-339 PAN stunt plane. The three Tricolores were priced at £1.2 million. It was also 9.7 km/h (6 mph) faster than a standard Zonda at 354 km/h (220 mph).

=== Zonda Revolución ===
In 2012, Pagani introduced the Zonda Revolución at the Goodwood Festival of Speed, an evolution of the Pagani Zonda R.

=== Zonda HP Barchetta ===
The Zonda HP Barchetta was unveiled at the 2017 Pebble Beach Concours d'Elegance as a present to the company's founder, Horacio Pagani for his 60th birthday as well as to commemorate the 18th anniversary of the Zonda. It has unique exterior design cues which makes it different from other Zondas produced with the most distinguishable features being the barchetta body style and rear wheel covers inspired by group C race cars, making it the first Pagani to ever use this styling. It also has a rear spoiler, air intakes and rear lights taken from the 760 series cars. Power comes courtesy of the 7.3 L (445 cu in) Mercedes-AMG V12 engine rated at 800 PS (588 kW; 789 hp) and 850 N⋅m (627 lb⋅ft) of torque making it the most powerful road legal Zonda ever produced. It borrows its seats and suspension from the Huayra BC along with its power output being identical to the BC with the only difference being that the BC has a Bi-turbo engine while the HP Barchetta is naturally aspirated. The wheels of the car also have different colour inlays with the wheels at the left having gold and the wheels at the right having blue inlays. Production is limited to just 3 units with one unit retained for Horacio Pagani's personal collection. The Zonda HP Barchetta marks an end to the Zonda's production run.

=== Zonda Revo Barchetta ===
One-off Zonda Revo combining Zonda Revolución track-focused body kit and 800 PS engine with Zonda Barchetta open-top experience.

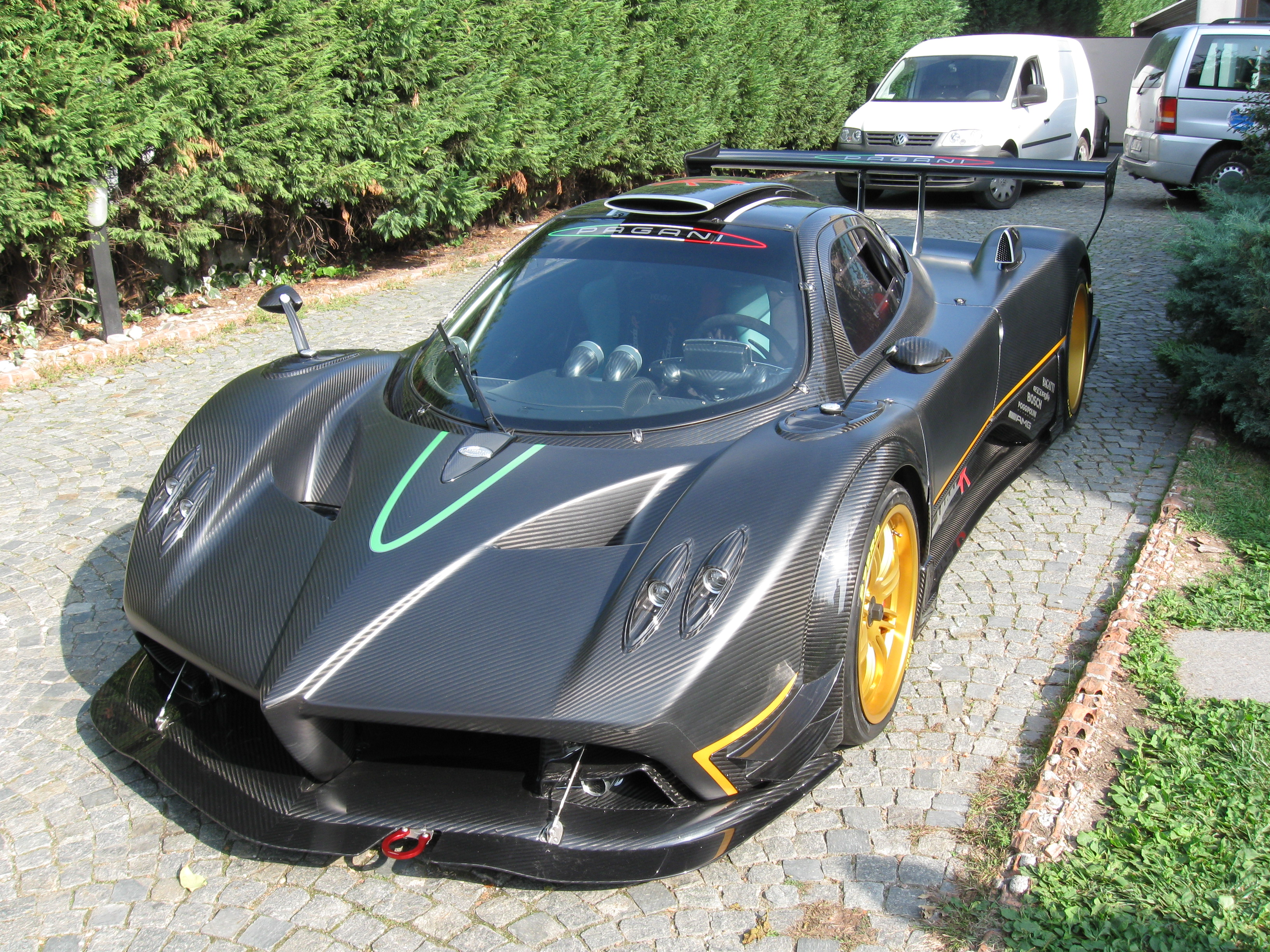
Zonda R

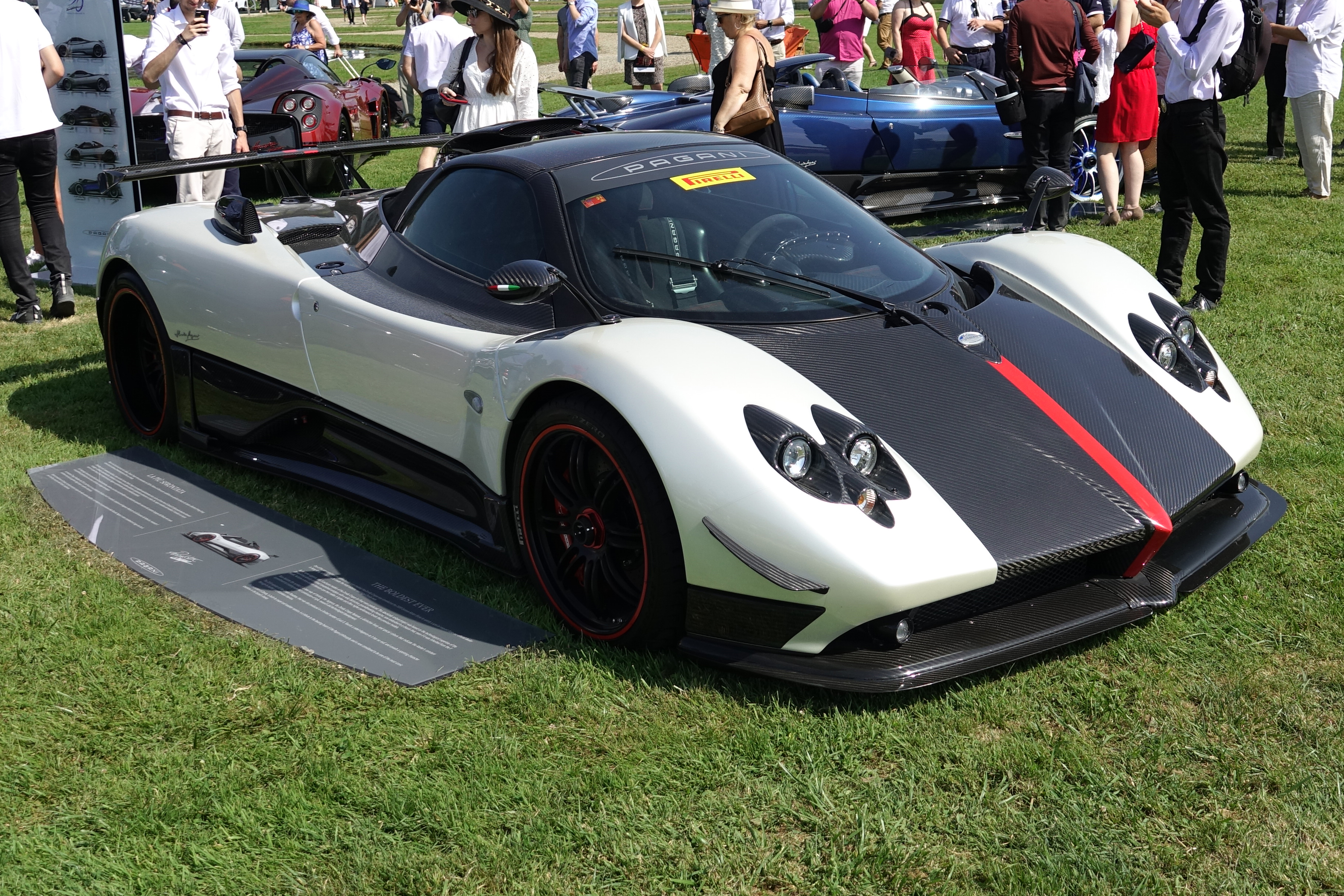
Zonda Cinque Roadster

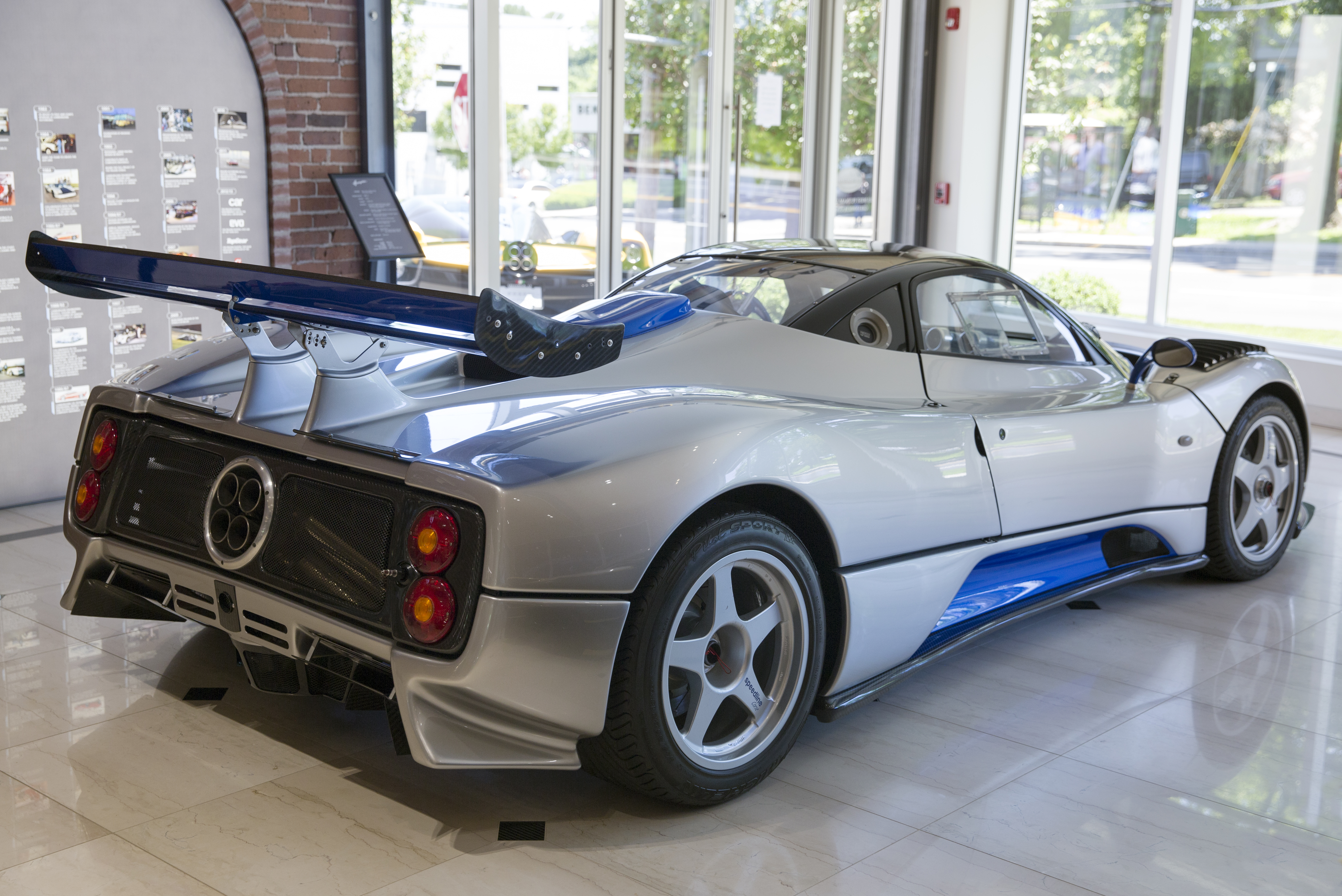
Zonda C12 S Monza; a one-off trackday special

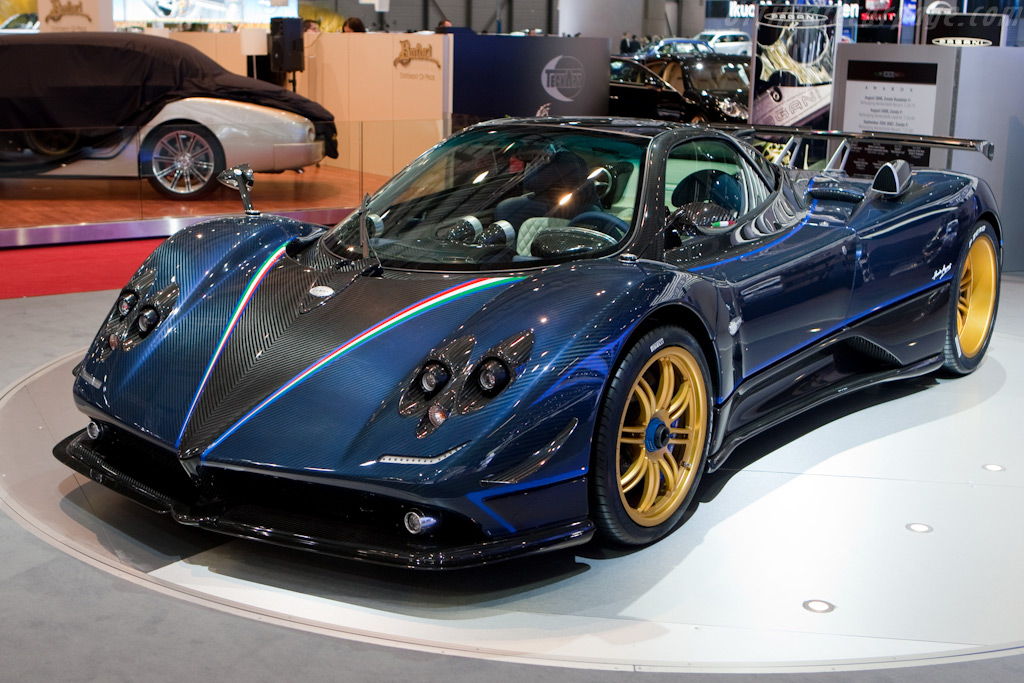
Zonda Tricolore

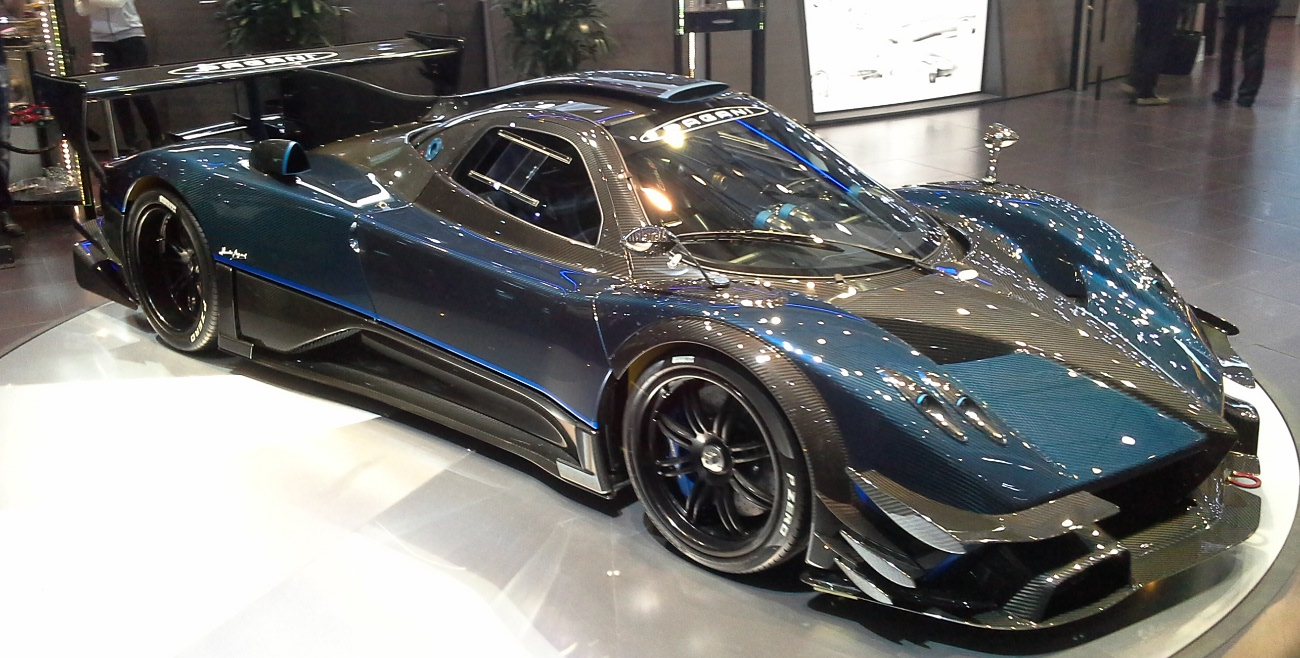
Zonda Revolución

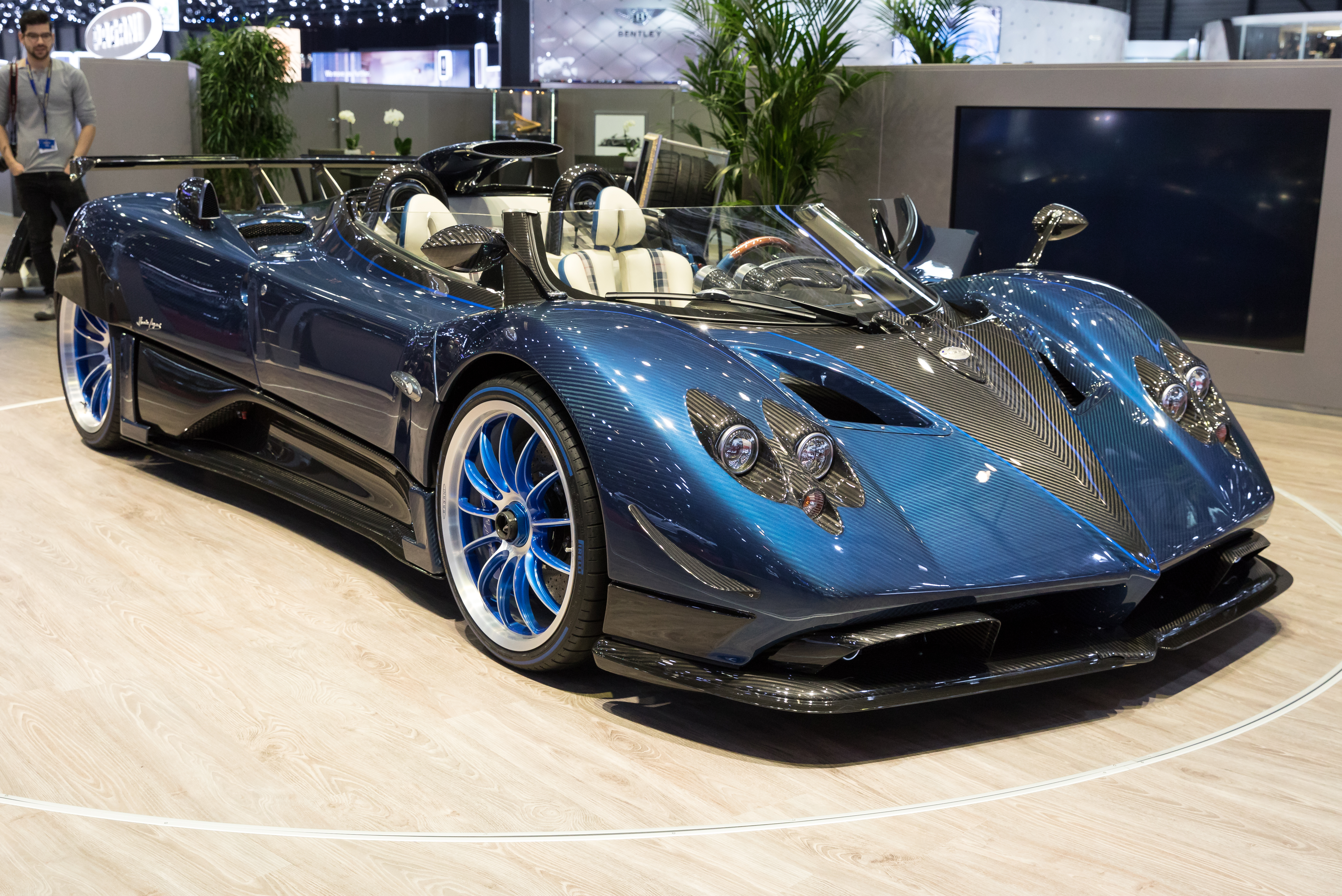
Zonda HP Barchetta

=== Technical data (all production variants) ===
Model	Year	Displacement	Peak power	Peak torque	Top speed	Acceleration time (seconds) 0–100 km/h (0–62 mph)
Zonda C12	1999	5,987 cc (365.3 cu in)	450 PS (331 kW; 444 hp) at 5,200 rpm	590 N⋅m (435 lb⋅ft) at 3,900 rpm	298 km/h (185 mph)	4.2
Zonda C12-S	2000	7,010 cc (427.8 cu in)	550 PS (405 kW; 542 hp) at 5,500 rpm	750 N⋅m (553 lb⋅ft) at 4,100 rpm	335 km/h (208 mph)	3.7
Zonda S Zonda Roadster	2002; 2003	7,291 cc (444.9 cu in)	555 PS (408 kW; 547 hp) at 5,900 rpm	750 N⋅m (553 lb⋅ft) at 4,050 rpm	335 km/h (208 mph)	3.7
Zonda F	2005	7,291 cc (444.9 cu in)	602 PS (443 kW; 594 hp) at 6,150 rpm	760 N⋅m (561 lb⋅ft) at 4,000 rpm	345 km/h (214 mph)	3.6
Zonda F Clubsport; Zonda Roadster F	2006	7,291 cc (444.9 cu in)	650 PS (478 kW; 641 hp) at 6,200 rpm	780 N⋅m (575 lb⋅ft) at 4,000 rpm	350 km/h (217 mph)	3.4
Zonda Cinque; Zonda Cinque Roadster	2009	7,291 cc (444.9 cu in)	678 PS (499 kW; 669 hp) at 6,200 rpm	780 N⋅m (575 lb⋅ft) at 4,000 rpm	350 km/h (217 mph)	3.4
Zonda Tricolore	2010	7,291 cc (444.9 cu in)	670 PS (493 kW; 661 hp) at 6,150 rpm	780 N⋅m (575 lb⋅ft) at 4,000 rpm	350 km/h (217 mph)	3.4
Zonda HP Barchetta	2017	7,291 cc (444.9 cu in)	800 PS (588 kW; 789 hp)	850 N⋅m (627 lb⋅ft)	355 km/h (221 mph)	

== Zonda One-off Series ==
The Zonda One-Off Series is a custom line-up built for special customers, sometimes made as rebuilds of existing (and sometimes crashed) Zonda chassis. These models have a 7.3-litre M297 engine but with a power output of 760 PS (559 kW; 750 hp) and 780 N⋅m (575 lb⋅ft) of torque.

== Racing ==
=== Zonda GR ===
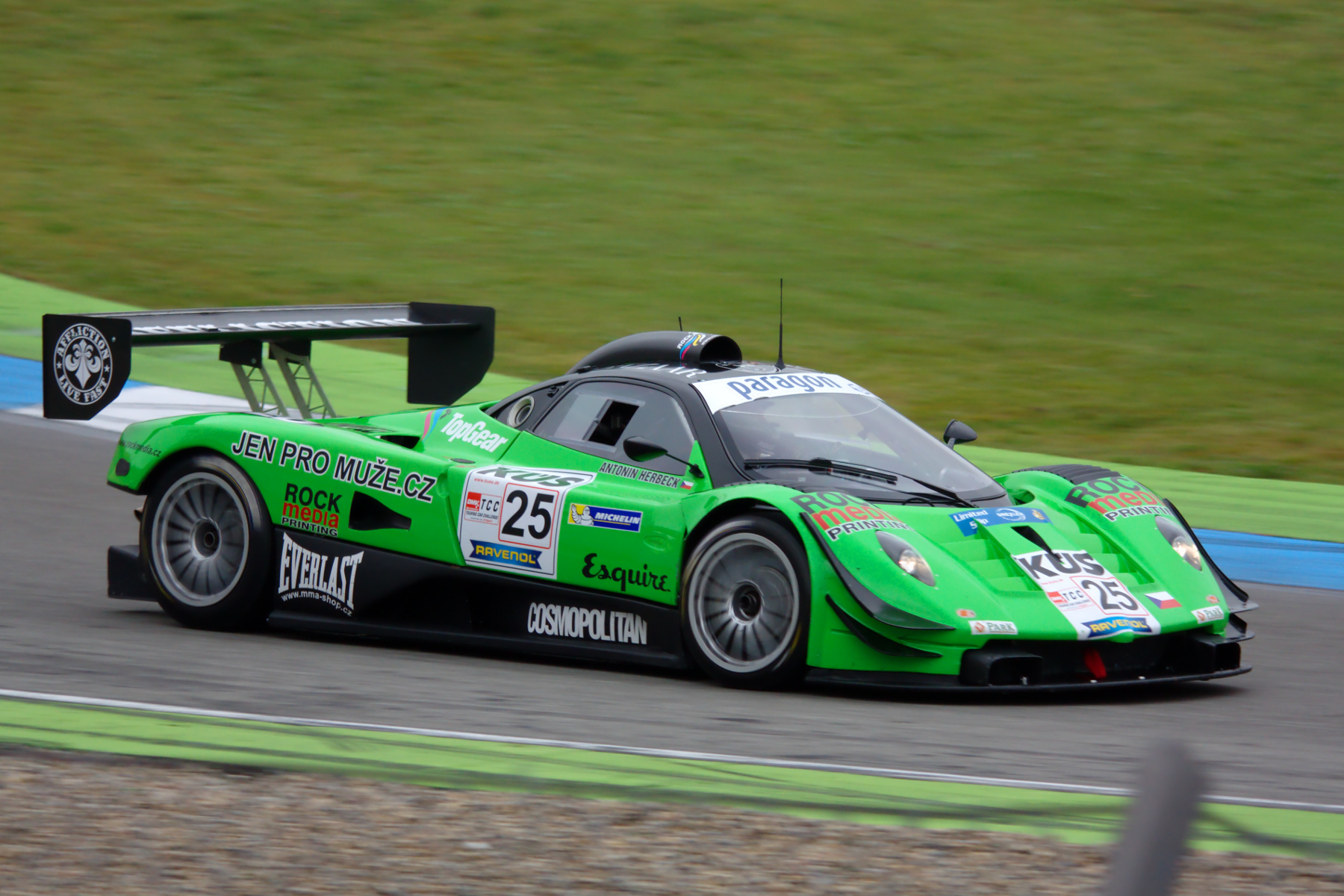
Pagani Zonda GR

Development of the Zonda GR started in December 2002. Tom Weickardt, owner of American Viperacing, Toine Hezemans, owner of Carsport Holland, and Paul Kumpen, owner of GLPK Racing, incorporated a new company, Carsport Zonda, to develop a racing version of the Zonda. They secured exclusive rights to develop, build and sell competition versions of the Zonda from Horacio Pagani, and the first GR was completed at Carsport's facility in Modena within months.

The Zonda GR is based on the Zonda S. It was built on the same carbon fibre chassis, with lightweight tube frames present on the front and rear. The bodywork was modified to include front and rear diffusers and louvers for improved aerodynamics. The car was 2 meters (6.6 ft) wide, in accordance with the regulations of the FIA and ACO. The car's weight was reduced to 1,100 kg (2,425 lb), and a new suspension system was designed. Along with new motorsport-oriented wheels and brakes. The engine was equipped with an enlarged radiator, two air intake restrictor plates, and the engine and gearbox also had new oil coolers. The resulting engine is rated at around 600 hp (447 kW; 608 PS) at 5,800 rpm and 580 lb⋅ft (786 N⋅m) of torque at 4,300 rpm with a redline increased to 7,500 rpm. Unrestricted, however, the 7.0 L V12 engine is capable of producing around 780 hp (582 kW; 791 PS) and 750 lb⋅ft (1,017 N⋅m) of torque. Performance figures include a 0 to 97 km/h (60 mph) acceleration time of 3.3 seconds.

The car was entered into the 2003 24 Hours of Le Mans, but retired after ten laps due to a gearbox failure.

== 24 Hours of Le Mans results ==
Year	Team	Drivers	Car #	Class	Laps	Pos.	Class Pos.
2003	(United States) Carsport America	(Netherlands) Mike Hezemans (Belgium) Anthony Kumpen (Netherlands) David Hart	61	GTS	10	DNF	DNF

== See also ==
- List of Top Gear test track Power Lap times

== Bibliography ==
- Morelli, Roberto (2010). Pagani, the Story of a Dream. Hugo Racca. ISBN 978-88-905083-1-8.
