= Chrysler ME Four-Twelve =

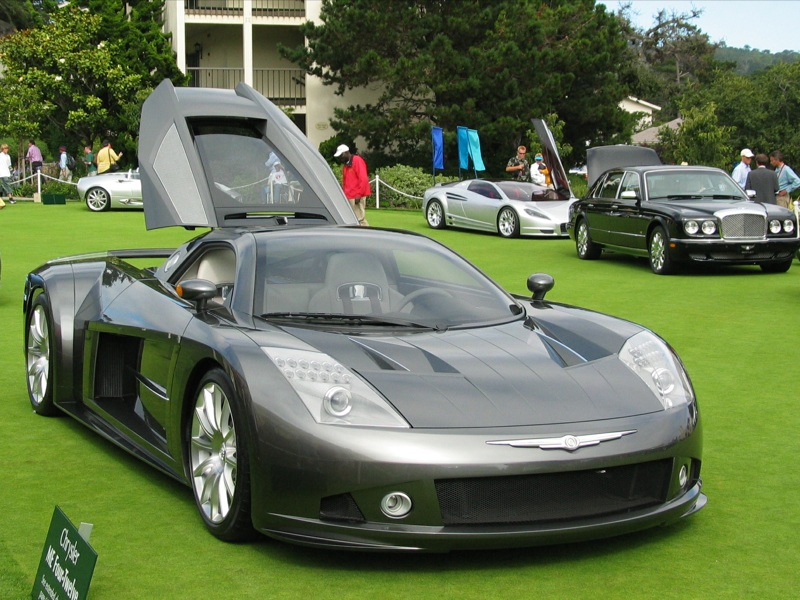

Overview
- Manufacturer: DaimlerChrysler
- Also called: Chrysler ME 412
- Designer: Brian Nielander

Body and chassis
- Class: Sports car (S); Concept car
- Body style: 2-door coupé
- Layout: Mid-engine, rear-wheel drive

Powertrain
- Engine: 6.0 L Mercedes-Benz M120 V12
- Transmission: 7-speed Ricardo-built dual-clutch automatic transmission

Dimensions
- Wheelbase: 2,794 mm (110.0 in)
- Length: 4,542 mm (178.8 in)
- Width: 1,999 mm (78.7 in)
- Height: 1,140 mm (44.9 in)
- Curb weight: 1,310 kg (2,888 lb)

The Chrysler ME Four-Twelve is an American high-performance concept car that was engineered, developed and produced by Chrysler in 2004. The ME Four-Twelve name is a combination of the Mid-Engine with Four turbochargers on a Twelve cylinder engine.

== Background ==
There were two ME Four-Twelve vehicles produced. The first was an auto show version using performance expertise from DaimlerChrysler, but with limited operational capabilities. It was designed behind-the-scenes during 2003 by a small team. The auto show vehicle, unveiled at the 2004 North American International Auto Show (NAIAS) in Detroit, Michigan took less than one year for design and development. The exterior design was done by American Brian Nielander.

Chrysler announced at the 2004 NAIAS that the ME Four-Twelve was a full running prototype. At the time, key personnel within the Street & Racing Technology group at Chrysler directed by Dan Knott (also responsible for the Dodge Viper, SRT production adaptations such as the Dodge Neon SRT-4 and Dodge Ram SRT-10, Dodge Motorsports, and Mopar performance parts) were alerted that another project was being considered; to design and build a fully engineered and functional prototype demonstration vehicle capable of achieving the published performance claims and being available for media track evaluation by the summer of 2004.

== Design ==
The chassis tub of the ME Four-Twelve was carbon-fiber and aluminum honeycomb. It used a 4130 steel rear subframe and aluminum castings. The body was lightweight carbon fiber. The low profile of the vehicle contributed to its aerodynamics, while multiple air-intakes enhanced cooling. The car used 265/35ZR19 tires in the front and 335/30ZR20 tires in the rear (on 19- and 20-inch cast-aluminum wheels, respectively). The brakes were six-piston-calipers with 16-inch discs at the front and back.

The modified 6.0 L aluminum Mercedes-Benz M120 V12 engine featured a newly developed cylinder head, special intake and exhaust manifolds, as well as forged internals such as pistons and crankshaft to accommodate the forced induction system (i.e., four turbochargers), which brought the output of the engine to 850 hp (634 kW; 862 PS). This would have made it the most powerful, as well as the fastest, road-going production vehicle at the time. The seven-speed transmission was a dual-clutch automatic transmission, with the capability of shifting gears in 200 milliseconds. Claimed acceleration from 0-60 mph was 2.9 seconds, and 0-100 mph in 6.2 seconds. It could cover a quarter mile in 10.6 seconds, with a trap speed of 136 mph (219 km/h). Estimated top speed was claimed to be 248 mph (399 km/h).

The ME 412's interior featured leather seats, a carbon fiber dashboard, and a chrome-covered center console with a leather tilt steering wheel, and gunmetal gauges. Other features included dual-zone climate control, a premium audio system, keyless access, and a push-button start system. The roof was made of glass.
